= German Society for Social-Scientific Sexuality Research =

German research organization

The German Society for Social-Scientific Sexuality Research (German: Deutsche Gesellschaft für Sozialwissenschaftliche Sexualforschung, DGSS) is a sexuality research and counselling organization (cf. sexology) based in Düsseldorf, Germany. It is primarily devoted to sociological, behavioral, and cultural sexuality research.

== History ==
The DGSS was founded in 1971 by German sexologist Rolf Gindorf and colleagues. It is the oldest non-medical sexological society existing in German-language Europe (that is: Germany, Austria, Liechtenstein, Luxembourg, and parts of Switzerland, Denmark, Belgium, France, and Italy). Its governing and international advisory boards have included many noted scholars, among them Rüdiger Lautmann, John Money, Gisela Bleibtreu-Ehrenberg, John Gagnon, Igor Kon, Liu Dalin, and Martin S. Weinberg. Society presidents are listed below.

From the very beginning, the DGSS has emphasized the importance of the social, behavioral, and cultural sciences for an adequate understanding of the human sexualities in their many forms, facets, and variations. In addition to traditional sexological fields like biology, physiology, and medicine, the DGSS focus has centered on the social sciences, psychology, and ethnology, embracing also educational, legal, and historical aspects. In 1978, the DGSS added a pioneering counselling institute (DGSS-Institut) to its scientific and research activities. Since then, more than 33,000 clients received sexual counselling or psychotherapy. Gay, lesbian and bisexual people form a considerable group. AIDS counseling and HIV testing has been provided since 1983.

Under difficult circumstances, with habitually low financial resources and minimal outside support, the DGSS has nevertheless managed to hold increasingly successful national and international sexological congresses, establishing a close cooperation with most German and many foreign sexological societies. Many scientific publications, including many books and a book series (Schriftenreihe Sozialwissenschaftliche Sexualforschung, published by de Gruyter since 1986; LIT Verlag since 2003), give a fairly adequate impression of sexological research by the DGSS and its members.

Once the Berlin wall had fallen, the DGSS was able to move its congresses to the original birthplace of sexology, and to resume the tradition of the Berlin sexological conferences started in 1921 by Magnus Hirschfeld. From July 25–27, 1997, the 13th DGSS Congress of Social Scientific Sex Research and 6th International Berlin Conference for Sexology took place at Berlin's Humboldt University, with the theme "100 Years of Gay Liberation". Scientists (most of them gay) came from many countries in Europe, the Americas, Asia and Australia.

From June 29 through July 2, 2000, the 14th DGSS Congress and 5th Conference of the European Federation of Sexology (EFS) was held at Berlin's House of World Cultures, hosting some 270 delegates from 34 countries, with the theme "For A Millennium of Sexual Health". In 2002, the 15th DGSS Conference from June 21–23 was moved, following the DGSS president-elect Gunter Runkel, to the Leuphana University of Lüneburg, near Hamburg. Its general theme: "Sexualities in the Third Millennium - Recent Developments in Sexuality Research". Again, sexologists from many nations attended, colleagues from the United States forming the largest contingent. In 2004, the 16th DGSS Conference on "Sexualities and Social Change" was again held in Lüneburg, where the 17th Conference ("Sexuality and Love") also took place on September 22–24, 2006. The 18th DGSS Conference ("Sexuality and the Media") took place in Munich from November 7–9, 2008, again with many Americans scheduled to attend.

== Presidents ==
- Rolf Gindorf (1971–1979, Vice President until 2004, now Honorary President)
- Helmut Kentler (1979–1982)
- Ernest Borneman (1982–1986, now Honorary President)
- Erwin J. Haeberle (1986–2002)
- Gunter Runkel (2002–2006),
- Jakob Pastoetter (since 2006)

== Magnus Hirschfeld Medal recipients ==
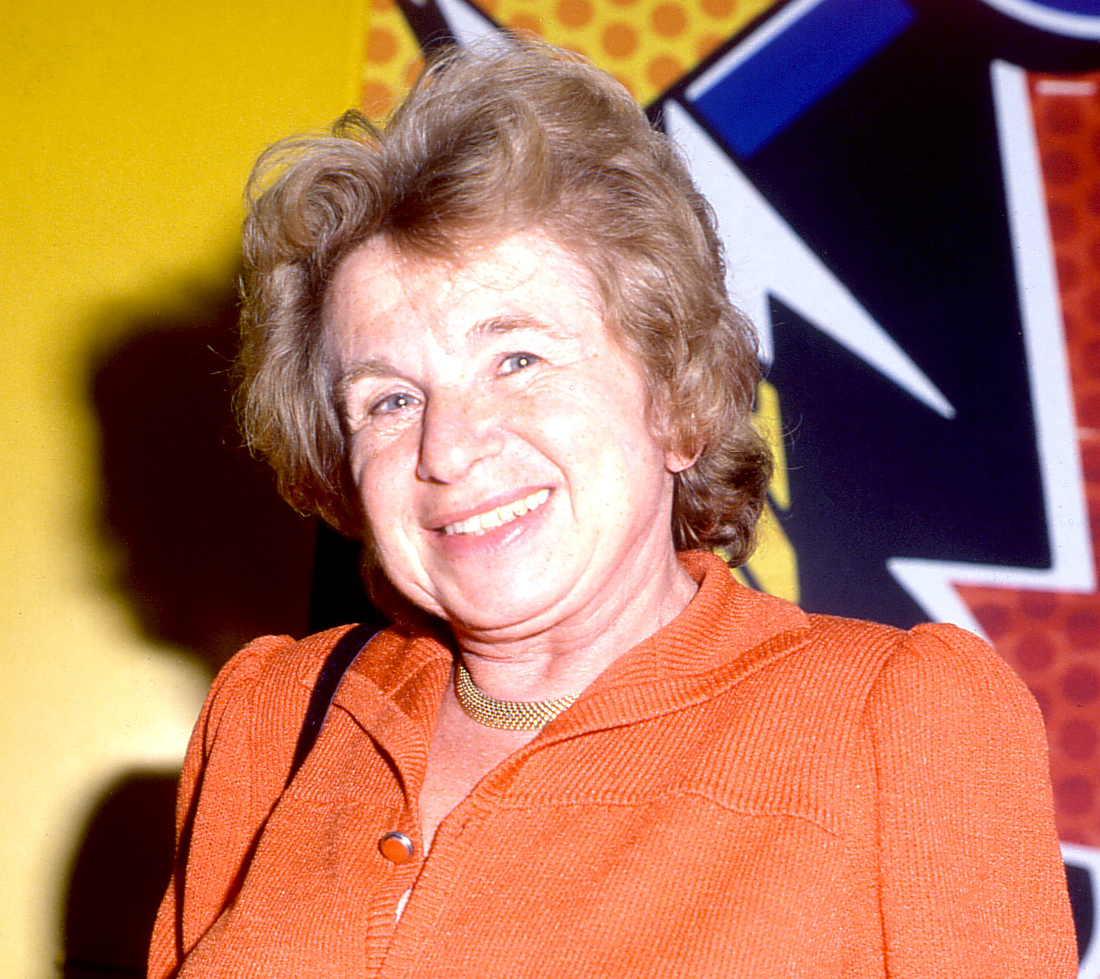
Ruth Westheimer, 1994 winner for contributions to sexual reform

Since 1990, the DGSS has been awarding its Magnus Hirschfeld Medals for Sexual Science and for Sexual Reform.

=== For contributions to sexual research ===
- 1990 Ernest Borneman (Austria)
- 1992 John Paul De Cecco (USA)
- 1994 Liu Dalin (China)
- 1997 Jonathan Ned Katz (USA)
- 2000 Milton Diamond (USA)
- 2002 John Money (USA)
- 2004 Martin S. Weinberg (USA)
- 2006 Richard Green (USA/UK)
- 2008 Hu Peicheng (China)
- 2016 João Décio Ferreira (Portugal)

=== For contributions to sexual reform ===
- 1990 Herman Musaph (Netherlands)
- 1992 Imre Aszódi (Hungary)
- 1994 Ruth Westheimer ("Dr. Ruth"; USA)
- 1997 Maj-Briht Bergström-Walan (Sweden)
- 2000 Oswalt Kolle (Netherlands)
- 2002 Manfred Bruns (Germany) and William Granzig (USA)
- 2004 Rolf Gindorf (Germany)
- 2006 Rita Süssmuth (Germany)
- 2008 Robert T. Francoeur (USA)

== See also ==
- German Society for Sexual Research
