= Magnus Hirschfeld Medal =

For outstanding service to sexual science

The Magnus Hirschfeld Medal is awarded by the German Society for Social-Scientific Sexuality Research (DGSS) for outstanding service to sexual science, granted in the categories "Sexual Research" and "Sexual Reform". It is named in honour of German sexology pioneer Magnus Hirschfeld (though DGSS diverges from some of Hirschfeld's theories).

== Previous winners ==
=== For contributions to sexual research ===
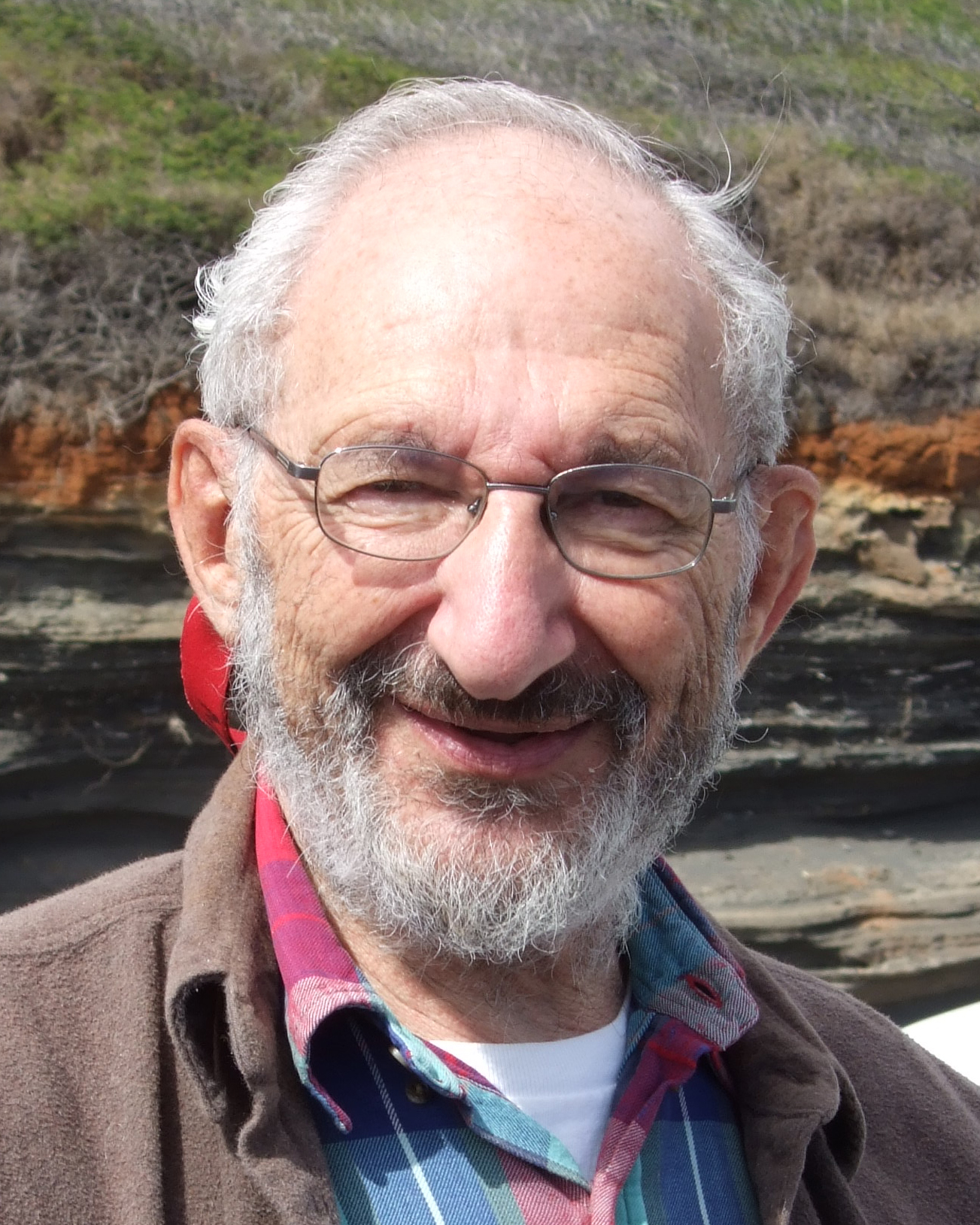
Milton Diamond

- 1990 Ernest Borneman (Austria)
- 1992 John Paul De Cecco (USA)
- 1994 Liu Dalin (China)
- 1997 Jonathan Ned Katz (USA)
- 2000 Milton Diamond (USA)
- 2002 John Money (USA)
- 2004 Martin S. Weinberg (USA)
- 2006 Richard Green (USA/UK)
- 2008 Hu Peicheng (China)
- 2016 João Décio Ferreira (Portugal)

=== For contributions to sexual reform ===
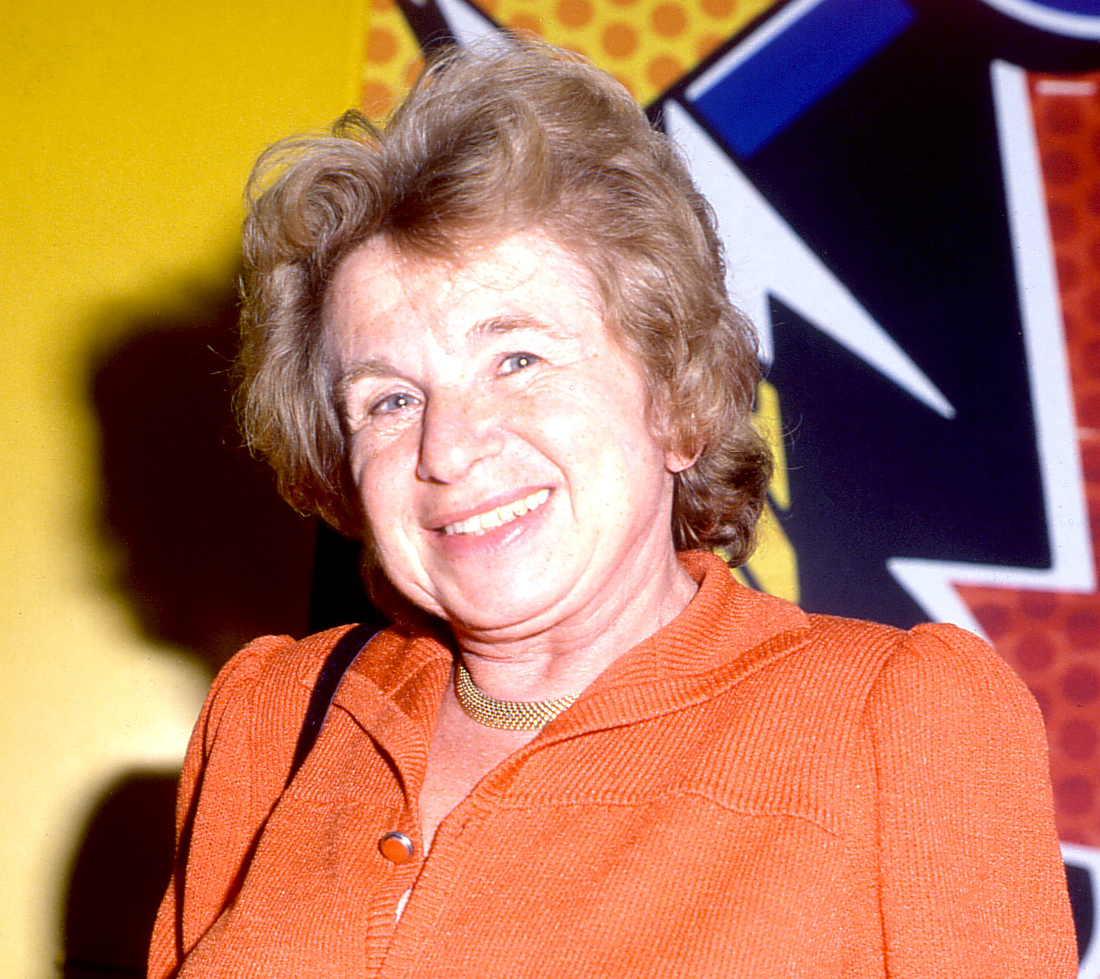
Dr. Ruth Westheimer, 1994 winner

- 1990 Herman Musaph (Netherlands)
- 1992 Imre Aszódi (Hungary)
- 1994 Ruth Westheimer ("Dr. Ruth"; USA)
- 1997 Maj-Briht Bergström-Walan (Sweden)
- 2000 Oswalt Kolle (Netherlands)
- 2002 Manfred Bruns (Germany) and William Granzig (USA)
- 2004 Rolf Gindorf (Germany)
- 2006 Rita Süssmuth (Germany)
- 2008 Robert T. Francoeur (USA)
