= Prostitution in the Netherlands =

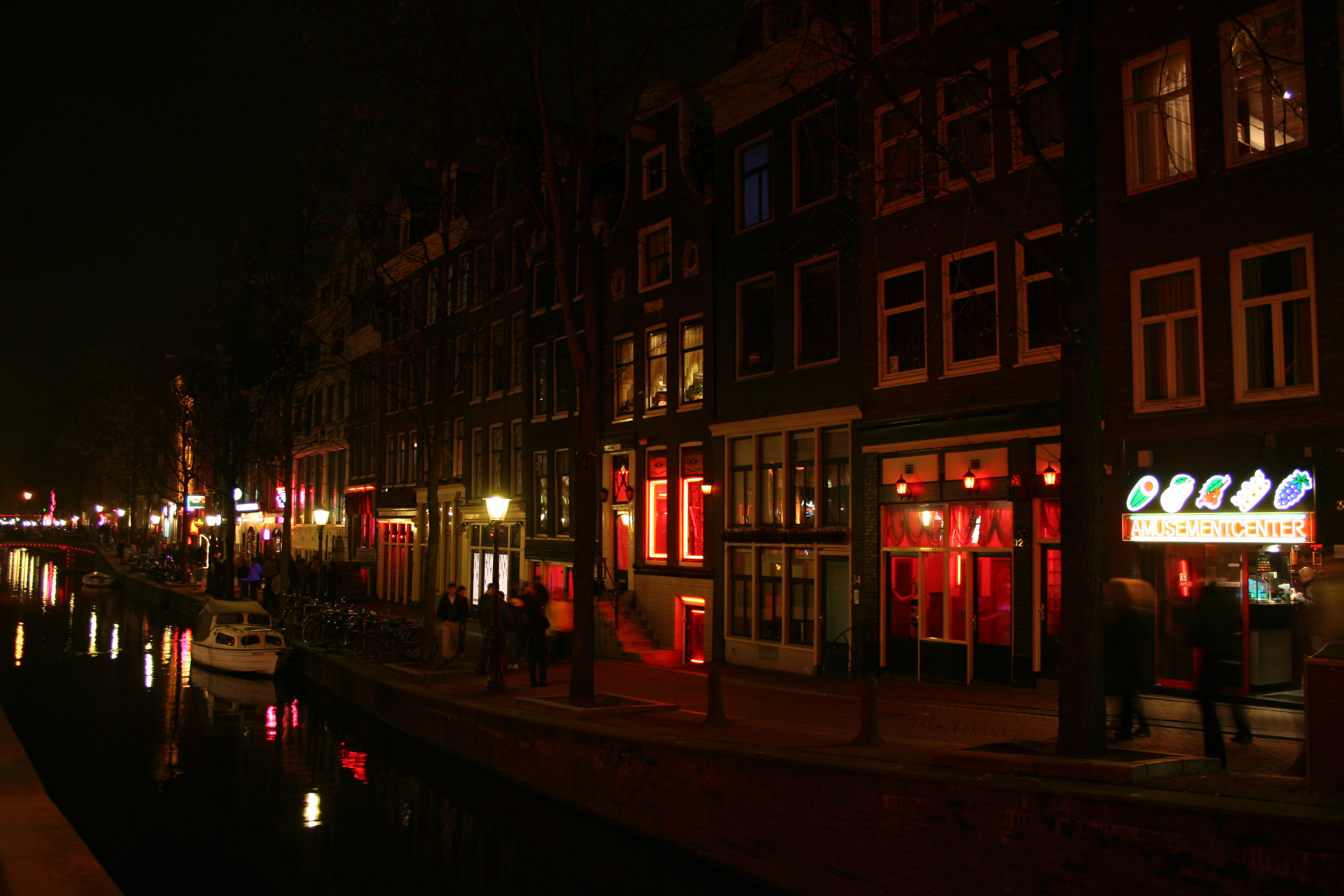
The red-light district De Wallen at night in Amsterdam

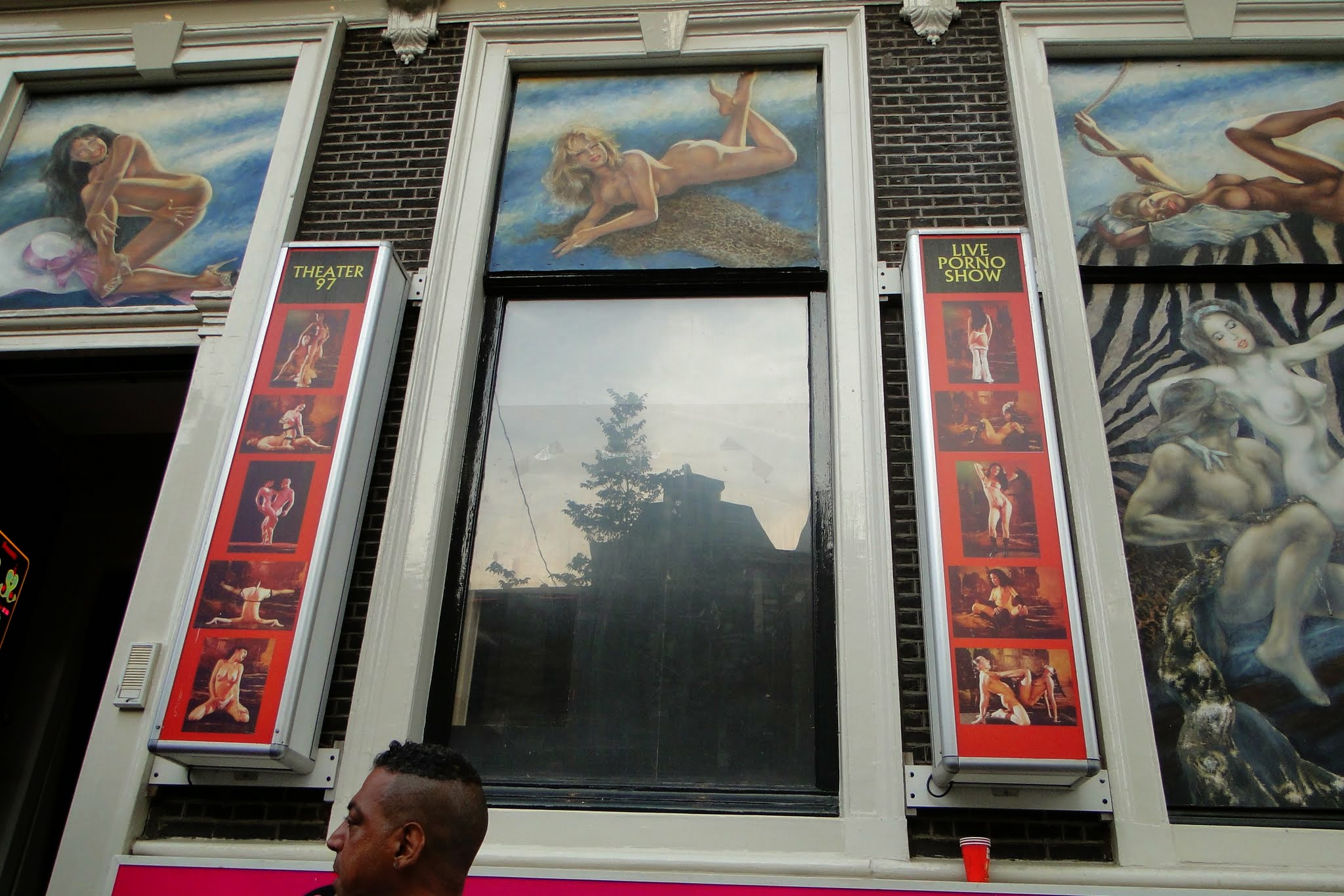
Sex theater in De Wallen

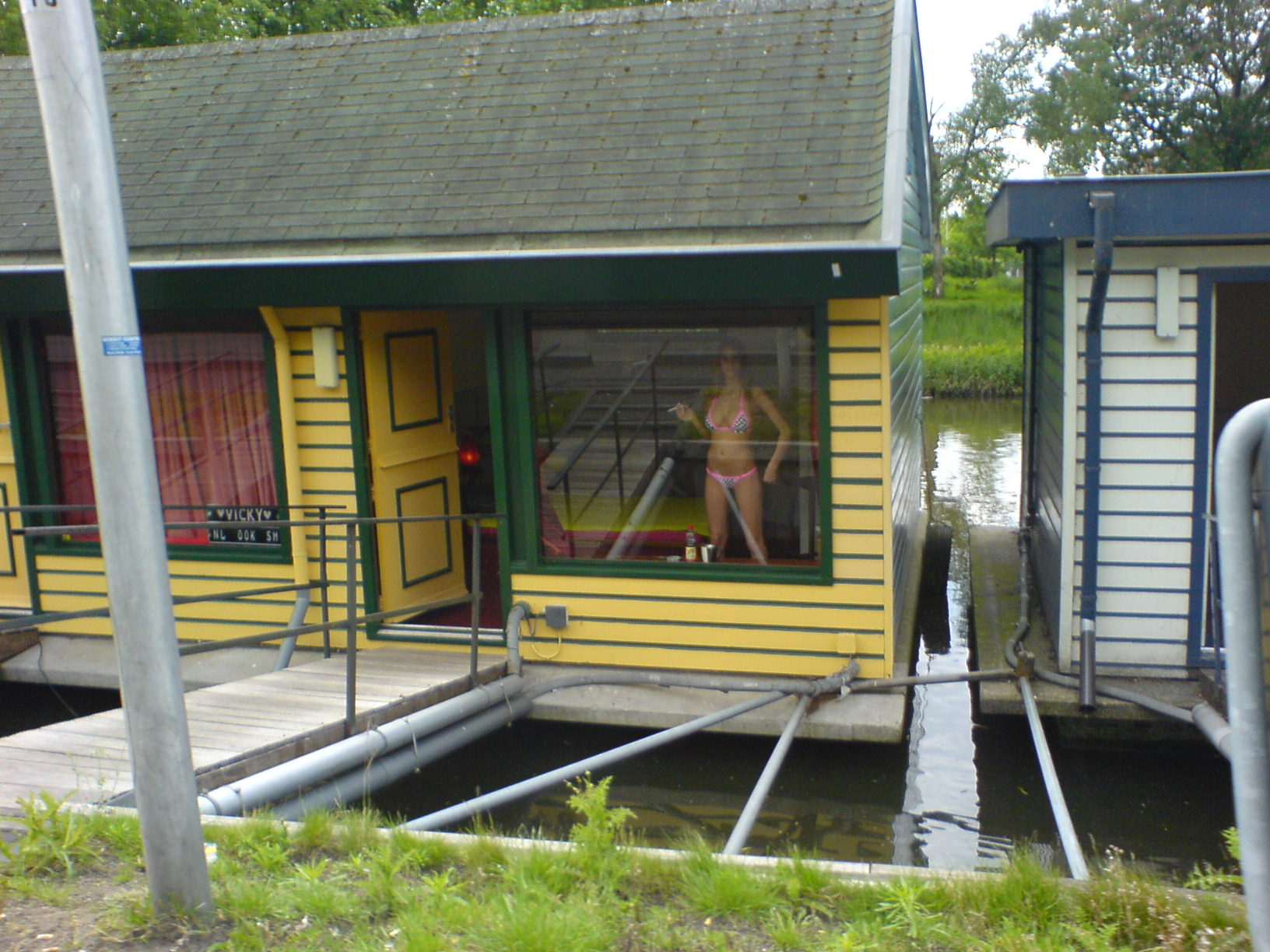
Window prostitution in Utrecht's former red-light district, Netherlands

Prostitution in the Netherlands is legal and regulated. Operating a brothel is also legal. De Wallen, the largest and best-known Red-light district in Amsterdam, is a destination for international sex tourism.

== History ==
=== Toleration during the Middle Ages ===
During the Middle Ages, prostitution was tolerated. The attitude of worldly and religious authorities towards prostitution was pragmatic. Many cities tolerated prostitution to protect non-prostitute female citizens from rape and defilement. There were, however, a number of conditions imposed on prostitutes and their clients. Prostitutes were not allowed to be married.

Still, prostitution was considered a dishonorable profession. Prostitutes were not expected to conform to sexual rules, and were not protected by the law. The concept of "honor" was very important in early modern Dutch society. Honor had social significance, but it also had legal ramifications. "Honorable" people had more rights. Until the late sixteenth century honor, aside from citizenship, was the most important criterion for the stratification of society.

Despite the fact that prostitution was seen as indispensable, city governments tried to separate "dishonorable" prostitution from the honorable world. Until the fifteenth century, Dutch cities tried to keep prostitution outside of the city walls. Later, city governments tried to reserve certain areas of the city for prostitution. Prostitution businesses were driven to the streets and alleys near the city walls.

Typical is the following decree from the city of Amsterdam in 1413:

Because whores are necessary in big cities and especially in cities of commerce such as ours – indeed it is far better to have these women than not to have them – and also because the holy church tolerates whores on good grounds, for these reasons the court and sheriff of Amsterdam shall not entirely forbid the keeping of brothels.

=== Regulation and suppression starting in the 16th century ===
During the sixteenth century, attitudes about sexuality changed under the influence of the Spanish occupation and rising Protestantism. Sexual activities were only tolerated within marriage. Church and state were not separated, and what was defined by the church as a sin was defined as a crime by the government. Prostitution and procurement were viewed as a sin and therefore prohibited. However, during this century the city of Amsterdam started to regulate prostitution. Only the police and the bailiff and his servants could keep a brothel in the Pijl and Halsteeg (currently the Damstraat). Prostitutes who practiced their trade in other parts of the city were arrested and their clients fined. Prostitution was a lucrative trade for the bailiff's servants as well as for the city treasury. In 1578, the city of Amsterdam left the Spanish side during the Netherlands uprising and converted from Catholicism to Calvinism. The city then stopped regulating prostitution.

=== 17th century: laissez-faire ===
Calvinistic morals were mirrored in the government policies of the seventeenth century. Titillating activities like dancing, fairs, and prostitution were sometimes outlawed. This morality did not, however, always correspond with the views and customs of the people. During the Golden seventeenth century sexuality was openly displayed in paintings and in literature. The image of the prostitute in literature was very negative. Prostitutes were portrayed as unreliable, impudent, lazy, and often ugly and dirty. In paintings, the image of the prostitute was more positive. Brothel-scenes were an important subject and prostitutes were painted as beautiful young women. The clients, however, were portrayed as fools who allowed themselves to be deceived. In both literature and paintings the madams were portrayed as evil profiteers. The authorities could not uphold the laws against prostitution and tended to leave brothels alone if they did not cause trouble.

=== 18th century: middle class adopts stringent morals ===
During the eighteenth century, the morals preached by the church and government became more in line with certain developments within Dutch society. There was a growing middle class which tried to distinguish itself by a strong work ethic and self-control. By restrained sexual behavior, the middle class could separate itself from the 'loose' lower class as well as the indecent nobility. Rich and poor also began to separate geographically. Prior to this period different social classes lived side by side, but they now lived in separate neighborhoods. The image of women also changed. Bourgeois women were seen by men of their class as faithful and chaste, but working-class women were viewed by middle-class men as potential prostitutes.

The working conditions of prostitutes were very poor. There was no proper birth control, condoms were not widely available and there were no effective cures against venereal diseases. Prostitutes often became pregnant and, because of venereal diseases, they eventually became infertile. This situation would not improve before the twentieth century.

=== Napoleonic mandatory registration and medical examination ===
At the beginning of the nineteenth century, the armies of Napoleon started to regulate prostitution in the Netherlands (in 1810) to protect soldiers against venereal diseases. Prostitutes were forced to register and were subjected to mandatory medical examinations in accordance with the Regulation System. Registered prostitutes were handed a red card which was a sort of work permit. If they were found to be infected, their red card was taken and they were given a white card instead while they were prohibited from working and were only allowed to work when declared fit. After the French occupation the Dutch government stopped regulating prostitution, but during several decades slowly began to regulate prostitutes again in the same style as under the French occupation. Many scientists during the nineteenth century believed that sexual abstinence for men was unhealthy. In their eyes, it was unavoidable that a number of women had to sacrifice themselves to protect the rest of the women from the destruction of an even more revolting kind. The women who had to sacrifice themselves were supposed to be lower class. Prostitutes themselves, however, were still despised and portrayed as disgusting creatures. Lower-class people themselves detested prostitutes.

=== Abolitionists outlaw the owning of brothels ===
During the 19th century, sexual morals became stricter, and a counter movement arose against regulated prostitution. In the beginning, this movement consisted of wealthy orthodox-Protestant Christians, but it later got support from other movements like Catholics, socialists, feminists and progressive liberals. They attacked the idea that men could not abstain from sex. Clients were viewed as low, dirty lechers, and the clients were not the young unmarried men prostitution was meant for, but were often well-off middle-aged married men. They also attacked the mandatory medical examinations, which were deemed degrading and ineffective to stop the spread of venereal diseases. Many prostitutes lived in the brothels and were bound to the madams by debts to pay off expensive working clothes. Prostitutes were often sold among madams, were subjected to fines, and could only leave the brothel under supervision. Medical expenses were added to their debt. Brothel keepers throughout Europe sold women among each other. The abolitionist movement in the Netherlands was largely connected to the international abolitionist movement. The movement slowly gained more influence, and during the last decades of the nineteenth-century city governments slowly started to abolish regulated prostitution. At first, the abolitionist movement mainly targeted mandatory health checks for prostitutes, but when the movement became more successful the focus shifted towards the people who profited from prostitution. In 1911 living on the avails of prostitution and owning a brothel were prohibited by law. Prostitution itself was not prohibited.

=== 20th century: toleration and eventual legalization ===
Until the 1970s, prostitutes in the Netherlands were predominantly white lower-class women from the Netherlands, Belgium, France, and northern Germany. During the 1970s, in the wake of the sex trips to south-east Asia by Dutchmen, the sex operators brought in women from Thailand and the Philippines. In the 1980s there was a second wave from Latin America and Africa. In the 1990s, after the fall of the Soviet Union, women came from post-Soviet countries. Foreign prostitutes are economically motivated to come to the Netherlands, and they tend to travel to engage in sex work between the Netherlands, Germany, Belgium, and other European societies.

During the second half of the twentieth century, prostitution and brothels were condoned and tolerated by many local governments. The police interfered only when public order was at stake or in cases of human trafficking. The reasoning behind this gedoogbeleid (policy of tolerance) was harm reduction, and the belief that the enforcement of the anti-prostitution laws would be counterproductive, and that the best way to protect the women was to tolerate prostitution. This genuine Dutch policy of tolerating formally illegal activities for harm-reduction purposes has been and still is also applied towards illegal drugs in the Netherlands. (See drug policy of the Netherlands.)

The Red Thread (de Rode Draad), founded in 1985, is a support and advocacy association for prostitutes, and works for the legitimization of prostitution and against the stigmatization of prostitutes.

The B-9 arrangement was created by the Dutch government in 1988 to bestow temporary legal residence on unauthorized migrant sex workers who, within a three-month window, bring charges against their traffickers. The government is to provide the victims with housing, social services, and legal assistance.

Brothel prohibition made it difficult to set rules for the sex industry. During the 1980s many municipalities urged the national government to lift the ban on brothels. In 1983 minister Korthals Altes had presented an amendment to the law on prostitution. It took until 1 October 2000 for brothels to leave the half-legal status of being tolerated and to become fully legal and licensed businesses. Prostitutes may work as regular employees, though the vast majority work as independent contractors. The Dutch union FNV has accepted prostitutes as members since that time.

In the 1990s, Dutch attitudes supported the legalization of prostitution: in a 1997 survey, 73 percent of Dutch citizens favored legalization of brothels, 74 percent said that prostitution was an "acceptable job", and in a 1999 poll 78 percent felt that prostitution is a job like any other job.

=== 21st century: reducing the size of the Red-light district ===
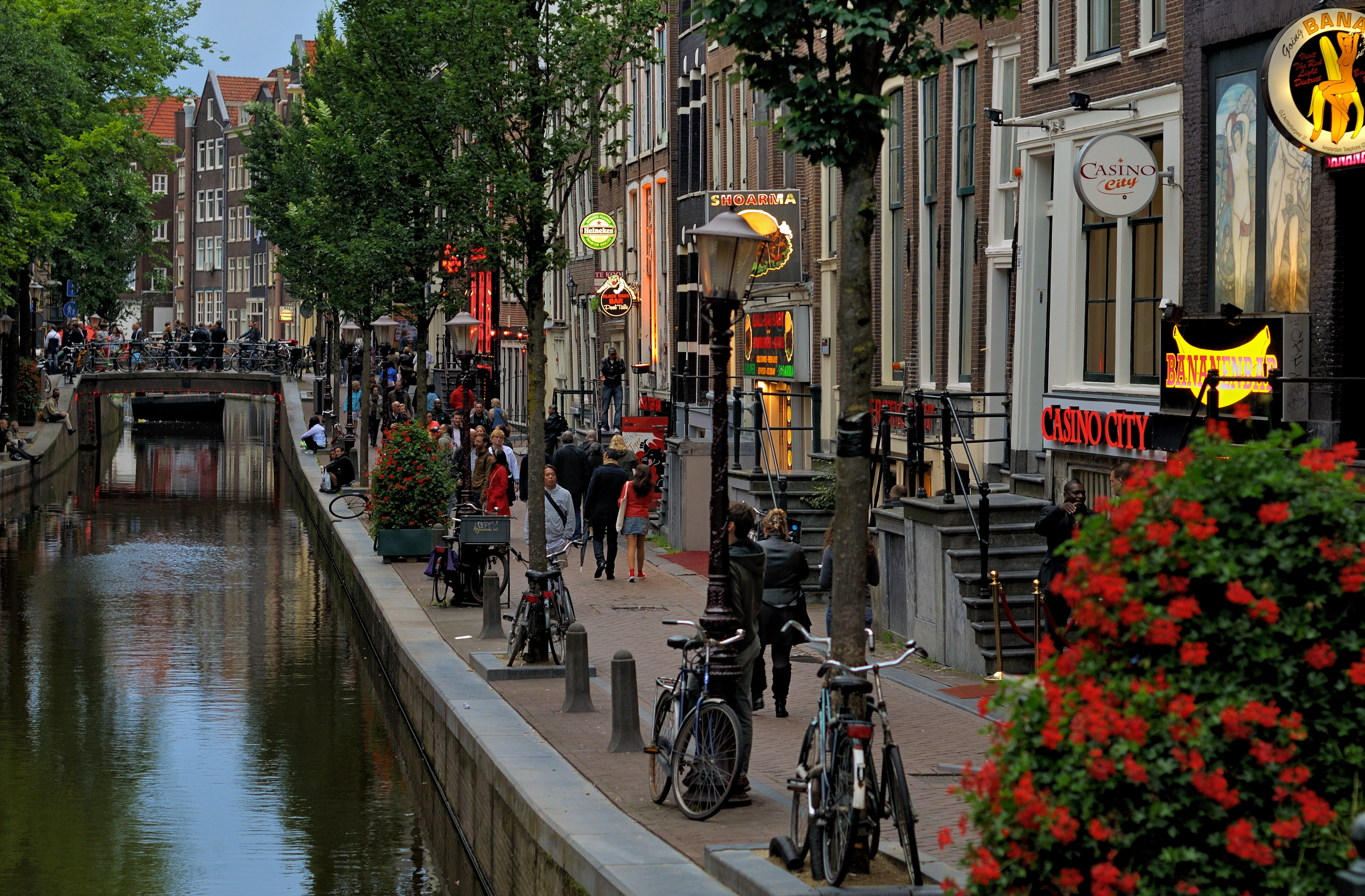
De Wallen, Amsterdam's red-light district, offers activities such as legal prostitution and a number of coffee shops that sell marijuana. It is one of the main tourist attractions.

When the Dutch government legalized prostitution in 2000, it was to protect the women by giving them work permits, but authorities began to fear that this business is out of control: "We've realized this is no longer about small-scale entrepreneurs, but those big crime organizations are involved here in trafficking women, drugs, killings, and other criminal activities", said Job Cohen, the former mayor of Amsterdam.

More recently, officials have noticed an increase in violence centered on this irregular industry, and have blamed this increase on the illegal immigration of individuals into Amsterdam to participate in the sex industry: "The guys from Eastern Europe bring in young and frightened women; they threaten them and beat them", said a resident of De Wallen. Prostitution has remained connected to criminal activities, which has led the authorities to take several measures, including detailed plans to help the prostitutes quit the sex trade and find other professions.

In 2005 Amma Asante and Karina Schaapman, two councilors for the Labour Party (Netherlands), wrote a report, "Het onzichtbare zichtbaar gemaakt" (Making the Invisible Visible). Schaapman had once been a prostitute and was getting information about the influx of organized crime and violence into the business. Other reports came out around the same time. They concluded that a large number of prostitutes in Amsterdam were being forced to work and were being abused by pimps and criminal gangs, and that the goals of legalization were failing.

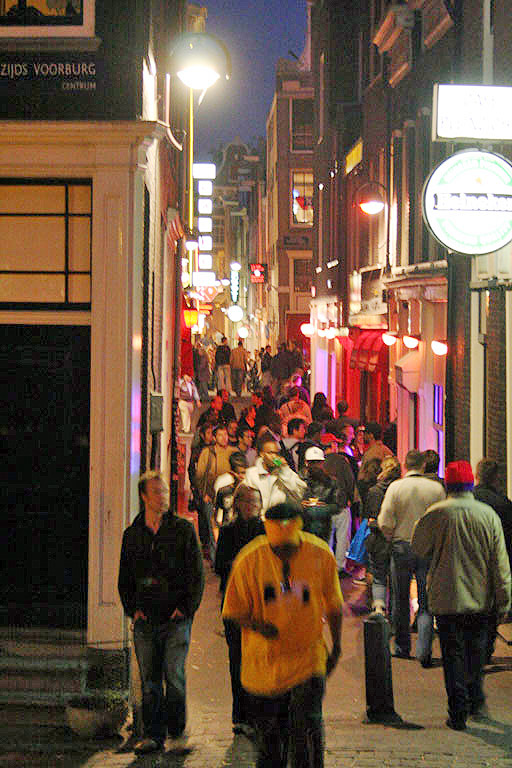
Locals and tourists visiting De Wallen, Amsterdam's red light district

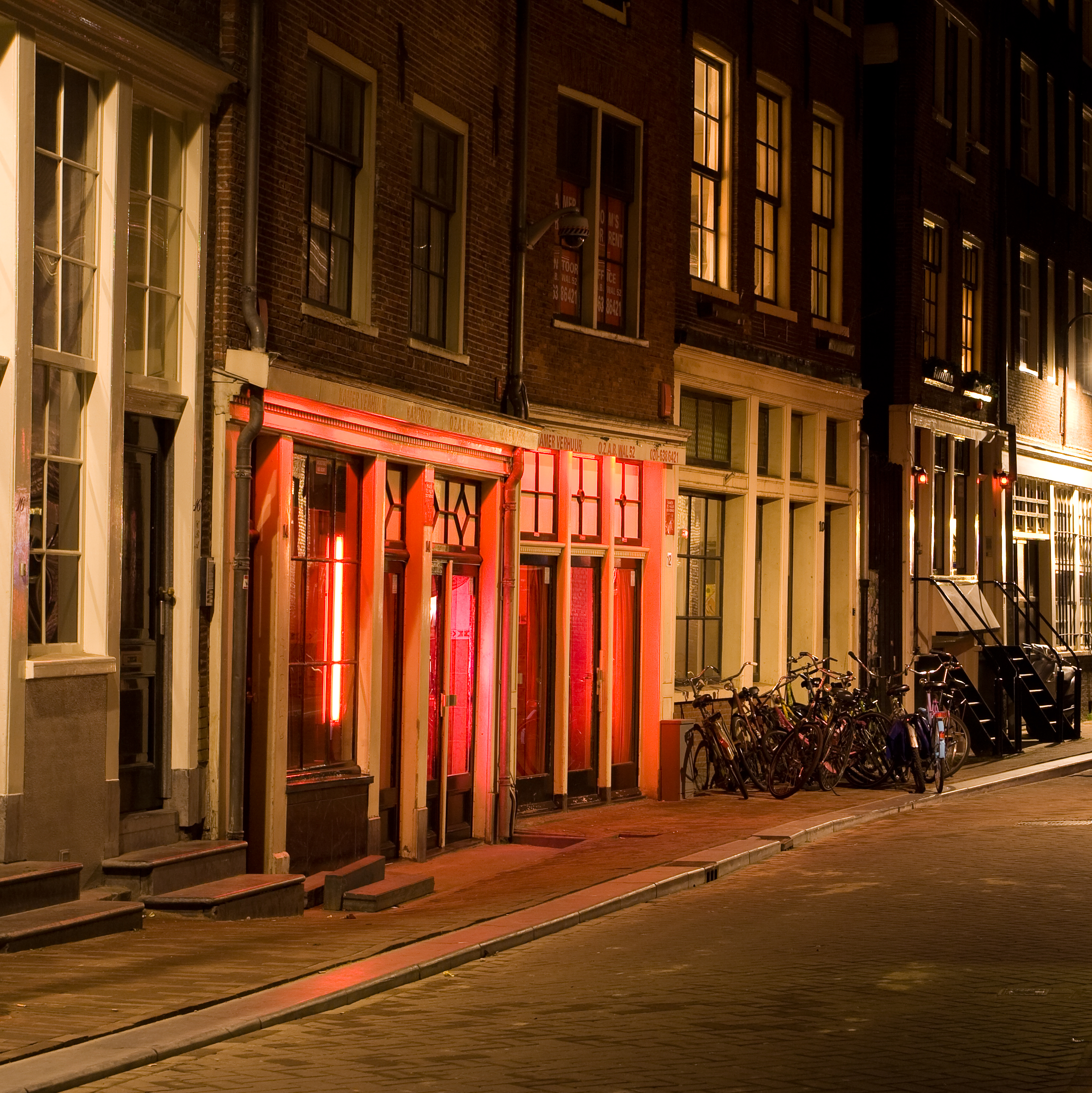
Glass doors to rooms rented by prostitutes at De Wallen

In response to the problems associated with the involvement of organized crime into the sex trade, the Dutch government has decided to close numerous prostitution businesses. Concerned about organized crime, money laundering, and human trafficking, Amsterdam officials under Mayor Cohen denied the license renewals of about 30 brothels in the Amsterdam Red-light district De Wallen in 2006; the brothel owners appealed. To counter negative news reports, the district organized an open house day in 2007 and a statue to an unknown sex worker was unveiled, "intended to honor those employed in the industry world-wide." In September 2007 it was announced that the city of Amsterdam was buying several buildings in the Red-light district from Charles Geerts in order to close about a third of the windows.

At the end of 2008, Mayor Cohen announced plans to close half of the city's 400 prostitution windows because of suspected criminal gang activity. The mayor is also closing some of the city's 70 marijuana cafes and sex clubs. This comes at the same time as the Government's decision to ban the sale of "magic mushrooms" and the closure of all coffee shops situated near schools. Nevertheless, Mayor Cohen has noted, "It is not that we want to get rid of our Red-light district. We want to reduce it. Things have become unbalanced and if we do not act we will never regain control."

In 2009 the Dutch justice ministry announced the appointment of a special public prosecutor charged with closing down prostitution windows and coffee shops connected to organized crime syndicates.

A law proposal was introduced in the House of Representatives of the Netherlands in 2009 and amended in 2010 which would ban prostitution by people younger than 21. Prostitutes are required to register; they receive a registration pass with a photograph and a registration number, but no name or other personal data. Clients are required to check this pass. In addition to municipal rules a national rule is introduced requiring sex companies to have a license, including prostitution companies such as brothels and escort agencies, but also, for example, adult movie theaters. Under the proposed amendments, an advertisement of an individual prostitute should contain his or her registration number, an advertisement of a sex company should contain its license number. The premises for public access of a sex company (if any) should have on the outside a sign showing that the company is licensed, while inside a copy of the license has to be displayed. A vote on the law has been deferred to allow both sides to examine the matter more closely.

The 70-year-old twin sisters Louise and Martine Fokkens, who have worked for decades as prostitutes in the Red-light districts of Amsterdam, were the subject of a 2011 film and a 2012 book. In a 2012 interview, they complained that the legalisation of 2000 had led to more criminality and to the taxation of the trade.

==== 2020–2021 temporary ban during COVID-19 pandemic ====
Due to the coronavirus pandemic, all legally operating brothels in the Netherlands were closed on 15 March 2020, based on emergency orders from their police district. The closing orders caught some customers in the middle of their acts. Since the Dutch government failed to provide financial compensation for sex workers (especially those who paid taxes through the "opting-in"-system, designed because sex workers cannot be employees obeying a boss), many of them were forced to continue to work, turning to illegal home-based prostitution.

As the Netherlands went into a semi lock-down, questions were raised in Dutch parliament about sex workers who had to continue to work to pay their bills, or even buy food. Christian politicians said they wanted to help women to escape from exploitation, but sex workers' unions responded that they don't want to be "saved" by people who would like to forbid prostitution again. Sex workers and their support groups complained several times, during radio and TV interviews, that politicians were talking about them, rather than talking with them. Sophie in 't Veld, Member of the European Parliament, argued that leaving sex workers out of the debate on sex work leads to wrong decisions, based on the loudest voices, from people who might feel that prostitution should be made illegal, instead of listening to experienced sex workers, and empowering sex workers to make their own choices.

Sex workers from licensed brothels who had paid taxes for many years felt betrayed by the Dutch government as many millions of Euros in support money were distributed to companies and independent workers to keep the economy afloat, but sex workers did not fulfil the rules for compensation, unless they had officially registered as an independent worker. Many sex workers in the Netherlands complained that they could no longer afford food or rent. Brothel owners feared that many sex workers would turn their backs on legally operating brothels for good and would continue to work illegally in residential areas, where they could remain anonymous.

According to a road map for relaxing of anti-Corona-measures presented by the Dutch government, the reopening of brothels in the Netherlands was supposed to take place in September 2020. In a later press conference, on 24 June 2020, it was announced that prostitution would be made legal again in the Netherlands starting 1 July 2020. After Belgium lifted the ban on prostitution from 8 June 2020 and the Belgian border reopened on 15 June 2020, both sex workers and customers started travelling to neighbouring Belgium. On 18 May 2021, sex workers were allowed to resume their jobs.

==== 2021–present ====
From 1 January 2022, a customer will be punished if they purchase a sexual service from a sex worker of whom they know or have serious reason to suspect that there is coercion, exploitation or human trafficking.

== Demographics ==
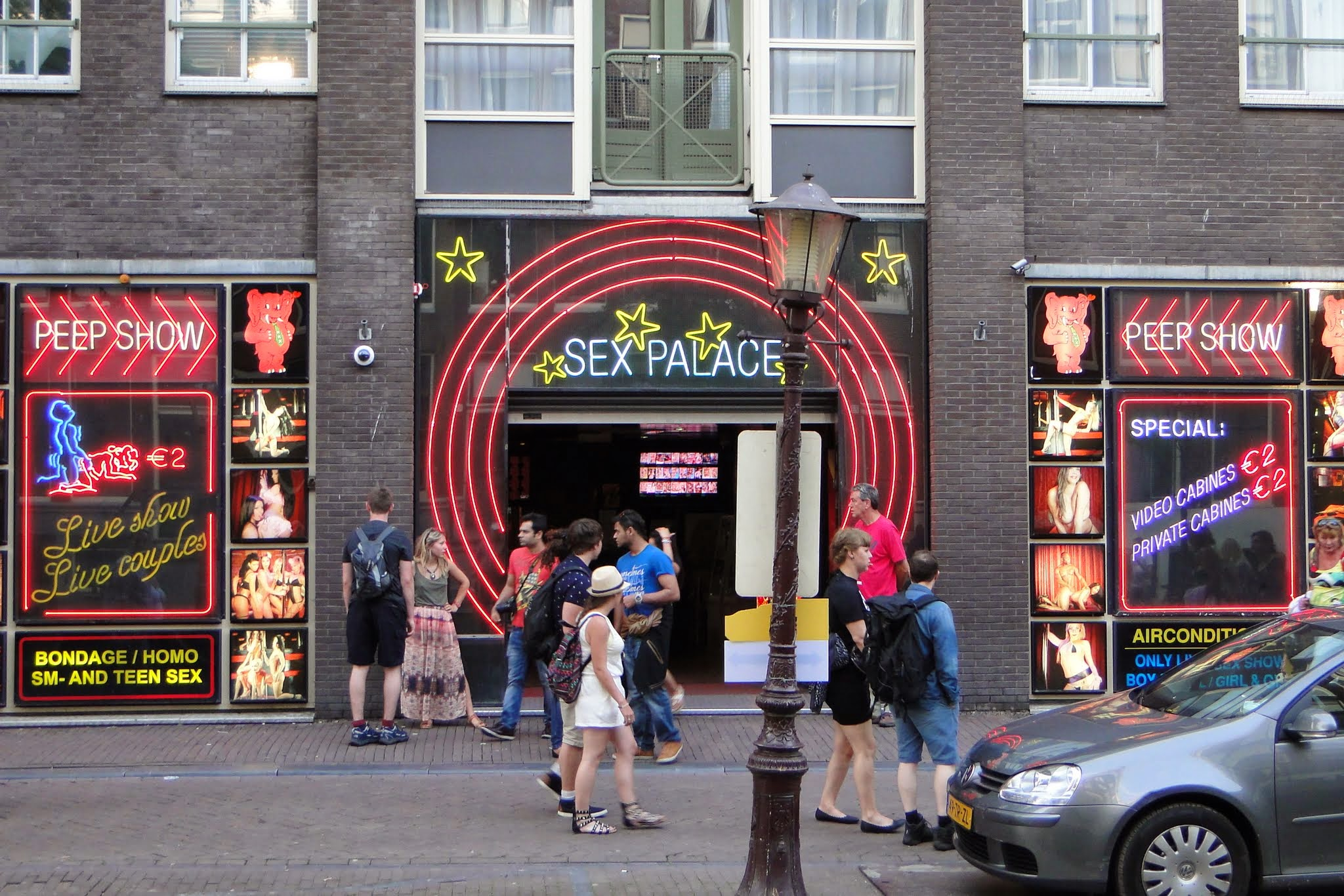
Sex theater in Amsterdam's De Wallen (red-light district)

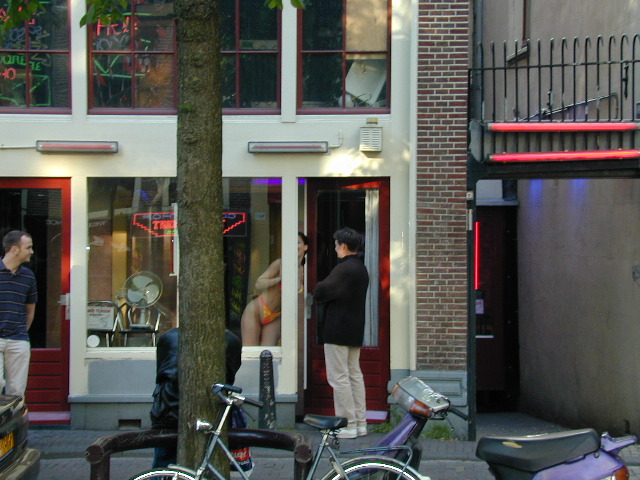
Man negotiating with a sex worker at De Wallen

=== Extent ===
As with other countries, estimates regarding the total number of prostitutes vary. Most sources place this number between 15,000 and 30,000.

An article published in 1997 in the International Encyclopedia of Sexuality claimed that the total number of prostitutes in the Netherlands was about 15,000 to 20,000. The Coalition Against Trafficking in Women has stated that there were 30,000 prostitutes in the Netherlands, citing the Associated Press. According to Radio Netherlands, in 1999, there were estimated to be 25,000 prostitutes in the Netherlands, with 12,500 working at any one time at a total of 6,000 locations.

In 2012, most prostitution consisted of females selling sex to males. About 5% of prostitutes were estimated to be males and 5% were transgender females.

In 2016, UNAIDS estimated the number of sex workers in the Netherlands to be 25,000.

=== Migrant sex workers ===
In the 1970s, the majority of migrant sex workers in the Netherlands were from Thailand, in the 1980s from Latin America and the Caribbean. No more than one third were Dutch nationals, the remainder representing 44 nationalities. The majority were from the Dominican Republic and Colombia.

An article written by Marie-Victoire Louis in Le Monde diplomatique in 1997, claimed that 80% of sex workers in Amsterdam were foreigners and 70% had no immigration papers (but did not quote the source). A Dutch report released in June 1999 estimated that two-thirds of sex workers were migrants.

In 2008, Karina Schaapman, a former sex worker and former member of the Amsterdam city council, produced a report about the Amsterdam sex trade. Schaapman said police had a list of 80 "violent pimps" and that 77 of these were foreign-born. She said that more than 75% of Amsterdam's 8,000 to 11,000 sex workers were from the former Soviet Union, Africa and Asia.

A 2009 study released by TAMPEP in 2009 put the number of migrant sex workers in 2008 at 60% (a decrease from 70% in 2006), originating from Central Europe (EU) 40%, Latin America 20%, Western Europe 12%, Eastern Europe (non-EU) 8%, Africa 8%, the Balkans 4%, Asia 4%, and the Baltic states 3%.

=== Customers ===
In a 1989 study, 13.5% of men in the Netherlands reported having paid for sex at least once in their life, and 2.6% had done so during the past year.

== In practice ==
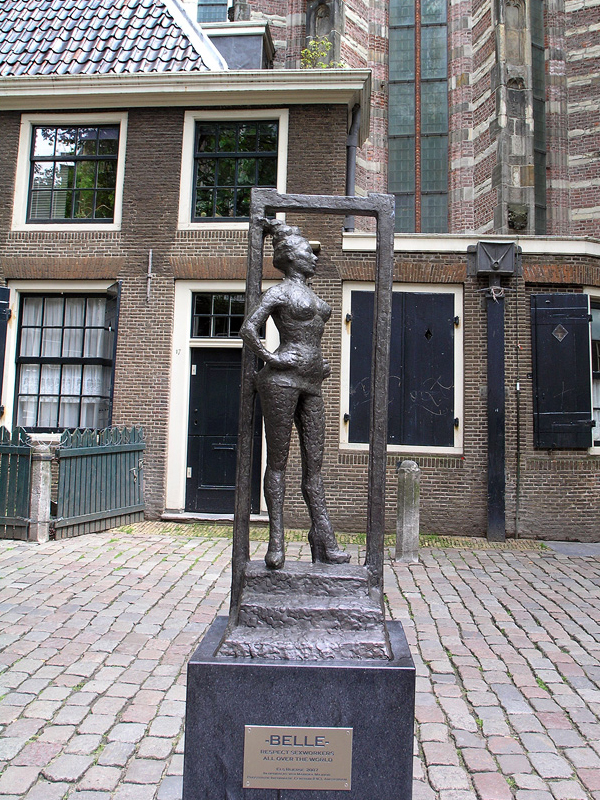
Bronze statue Belle in front of the Oude Kerk by Els Rijerse. The inscription reads "Respect sex workers all over the world."

According to the International Encyclopedia of Sexuality, during the 1990s, some 10% of prostitutes worked on the streets, 30% in window prostitution, 30% in sex clubs, 15% in an escort service, and 15% in their private residence. Drug addicts, including drug tourists, were said to be numerous in the street prostitution group.

Some Dutch cities provide facilities called "afwerkplek", a sex drive-in enclosure for cars for street prostitution.

According to Radio Netherlands in 2012, prostitution was concentrated in and around the big cities and in the border towns in the regions of Limburg, Groningen, Twente, West Brabant and Zeeland. Prostitution occurred in various forms: window and street prostitution, clubs, escort agencies, and home-based prostitution. Window prostitution occurred in 12 cities in the Netherlands. It was estimated that on average some 2,000 sex workers were engaged daily in this form of prostitution. Street prostitution existed in 10 Dutch cities and involved on average some 320 sex workers daily. Between 3,500 and 4,000 sex workers were employed daily in 600–700 clubs and private brothels. The extent of other forms of prostitution such as escort agencies and home-based prostitution was much more difficult to estimate. Home-based prostitution occurred in at least 17 municipalities, and escort agencies existed in at least 28 municipalities.

In 2008, city statistic showed 142 licensed brothels in Amsterdam, with about 500 window displays, and officials estimated that sexual transactions in Amsterdam account for about 100 million US dollars per year.

In 2011 Dutch authorities started asking sex workers to pay taxes on their earnings.

== Sex worker organisations ==
=== National organisations ===
Sex workers in the Netherlands have set up various organisations in order to guard their interests, including human rights, labour rights, healthcare and social inclusion. The first historical example of a Dutch labour union for sex workers was The Red Thread (De Rode Draad) (1985–2012). PROUD (labour union) is a national sex trade union for (former) sex workers based in Amsterdam, founded in 2015 as a successor of The Red Thread. Red Light United was founded in 2019 as a trade union of (mostly migrant) window workers on De Wallen in Amsterdam. The Prostitution Information Center (PIC) in Amsterdam has been providing information to sex workers, customers, tourists, the government and the general public since 1994. In addition, the Aidsfonds / Soa AIDS Nederland is an Amsterdam-based organisation which runs a Sex Work Projects Programme to prevent HIV/AIDS and STIs amongst sex workers.

=== International organisations ===
Amsterdam is also home to several international sex worker organisations, labour unions, networks, support groups and programmes. The International Committee for Prostitutes' Rights (ICRP) was founded in Amsterdam in 1985, where the first of a series of World Whores Congresses was hosted the same year, at which the World Charter for Prostitutes' Rights was adopted. It was relaunched as the International Committee for the Rights of Sex Workers in Europe (ICRSE) in Amsterdam in 2005, and drew up another charter of rights for sex workers, with a focus on European countries. TAMPEP, founded in 1993, based in Amsterdam and hosted from Helsinki, calls itself the "European Network for HIV/STI Prevention and Health Promotion among Migrant Sex Workers". The Red Umbrella Fund (RUF) was founded in 2012 as an Amsterdam-based fund making grants to sex workers' rights groups worldwide. In addition, the La Strada International Association (LSI) is an Amsterdam-based anti-trafficking organisation which has the decriminalisation of sex work as a "strategic focus area".

== Sex trafficking ==
NGOs and police estimated that the number of women and girls trafficked for the purpose of sexual exploitation ranged from 1,000 to 3,600. The Foundation Against Trafficking in Women (STV), an independent NGO that helped victims of trafficking, registered 579 victims in 2006, up from 424 in 2005. The top five countries of origin were the Netherlands (157 victims), Nigeria (91), Bulgaria (42), Romania (35), and China (30).

Countries that are major sources of trafficked persons include Thailand, India, the Netherlands, Mexico, China, Nigeria, Albania, Bulgaria, Belarus, Moldova, Ukraine, Sierra Leone, and Romania.

According to figures obtained from the National Centre against Human Trafficking, there were 1,711 registered presumed victims of human trafficking in 2012, of whom 1,177 were women forced to work in the sex industry. However, an increase in identified presumed victims does not necessarily mean an increase in trafficking but can be caused by, for instance, better awareness and cooperation among the different agencies which come into contact with potential victims.

Within the Netherlands, victims are often recruited by so-called "loverboys" – men who seduce young Dutch women and girls and later coerce them into prostitution. The phenomenon was highlighted in 2008 by Maria Mosterd, who published a book about her ordeal as the 12-year-old victim of a loverboy. The truthfulness of this book is disputed, and was the subject of an investigative journalism report.

Many victims of human trafficking are led to believe by organized criminals that they are being offered work in hotels or restaurants or in child care and are forced into prostitution with the threat or actual use of violence. Estimates of the number of victims vary from 1,000 to 7,000 on a yearly basis. Most police investigations on human trafficking concern legal sex businesses. All sectors of prostitution are well represented in these investigations, but window brothels in particular are overrepresented.

At the end of 2008, a gang of six people was sentenced to prison terms of eight months to 7½ years in what prosecutors said was the worst case of human trafficking ever brought to trial in the Netherlands. The case involved more than 100 female victims, violently forced to work in prostitution. In December 2009, two Nigerian men were sentenced to 4 and 4½ years in prison for having smuggled 140 Nigerian women aged 16–23 into the Netherlands. The women were made to apply for asylum and then removed from asylum centers to work as prostitutes in surrounding countries. The men were said to have used "voodoo" curses on the women to prevent escape and enforce payment of debts.

The US State Department's Office to Monitor and Combat Trafficking in Persons ranks the Netherlands as a 'Tier 1' country, indicating full compliance with the minimum standards of the Victims of Trafficking and Violence Protection Act of 2000 (TVPA).

== See also ==
- Prostitution in the Dutch Caribbean

== Sources ==
- Kuisheid voor mannen, vrijheid voor vrouwen (1997), Petra de Vries (Chastity for men, freedom for women)
- Mobiliteit in de Nederlandse prostitutie 1998–1999 (Mobility in Dutch prostitution 1998–1999)
- Nghiệp đoàn mại dâm Amsterdam chống giảm giờ làm ăn, in Vietnamese (Amsterdam sex workers union against reduced business hours)
- Prostitutie naar een illegaal en onzichtbaar circuit? Een verkennend onderzoek naar enkele onbedoelde gevolgen van de opheffing van het bordeelverbod in Twente, by M.D.E. Averdijk 2002 (Is Prostitution an illegal and invisible circuit? An exploratory investigation of some unintended consequences of abolishing the ban on brothels in Twente)

=== Migration and trafficking ===
- Human trafficking in the Netherlands Website of the Dutch Coordination Centre Human Trafficking (CoMensha)
- Dutch National Rapporteur Website of the Dutch National Rapporteur on Trafficking in Human Beings and Sexual Violence against Children
- Trafficking in Human Beings, First report of the Dutch National Rapporteur, Second report, Third report, and Fourth report
- Research based on case studies of victims of trafficking in human beings in 3 EU Member States, including the Netherlands.
- Dina Siegel: Human trafficking and legalized prostitution in the Netherlands. Temida March 2009

=== Health ===
- HIV-surveys bij hoog-risicogroepen in Rotterdam 2002–2003, in Dutch
- HIV-surveys bij hoog-risicogroepen in Amsterdam 2003–2004, in Dutch
- TAMPEP, Transnational AIDS/STD prevention among migrant prostitutes in Europe, September 2000/February 2002, Final Report
- TAMPEP report, June 2002 – June 2004, part 1, part 2
- de Graaf R, Vanwesenbeeck I, van Zessen G, Straver CJ, Visser JH. The effectiveness of condom use in heterosexual prostitution in the Netherlands. AIDS 1993

=== History ===
- De Vries, Petra (2008). "Josephine Butler and the Making of Feminism: international abolitionism in the Netherlands (1870–1914)". Women's History Review. 17 (2): 257–277. doi:10.1080/09612020701707274. S2CID 219610147.
- "In het leven – Vier Eeuwen prostitutie in Nederlands" (1997), Marieke van Doorninck, Margot Jongedijk (In life – Four Centuries of Dutch prostitution)
- Geschiedenis. Marieke van Doorninck 1999
- "Het Amsterdams hoerdom: prostitutie in de zeventiende en achttiende eeuw" (1996), Lotte van der Pol (Amsterdam whoredom: prostitution in the seventeenth and eighteenth centuries)
- Sekswerk erfgoed

=== Policy ===
- Trends in prostitutie en beleid: De tweede rapportage van de Profeitstudie. Mr. A. de Graaf Stichting 2000
