= Haeberle =

Haeberle or Häberle is a German surname. Notable people with the surname include:

- Erwin J. Haeberle (1936–2021), German sexologist
- Peter Häberle (1934–2025), German legal scholar
- Ronald L. Haeberle (born c. 1940), American photographer
