= William Granzig =

American sexologist (1939–2019)

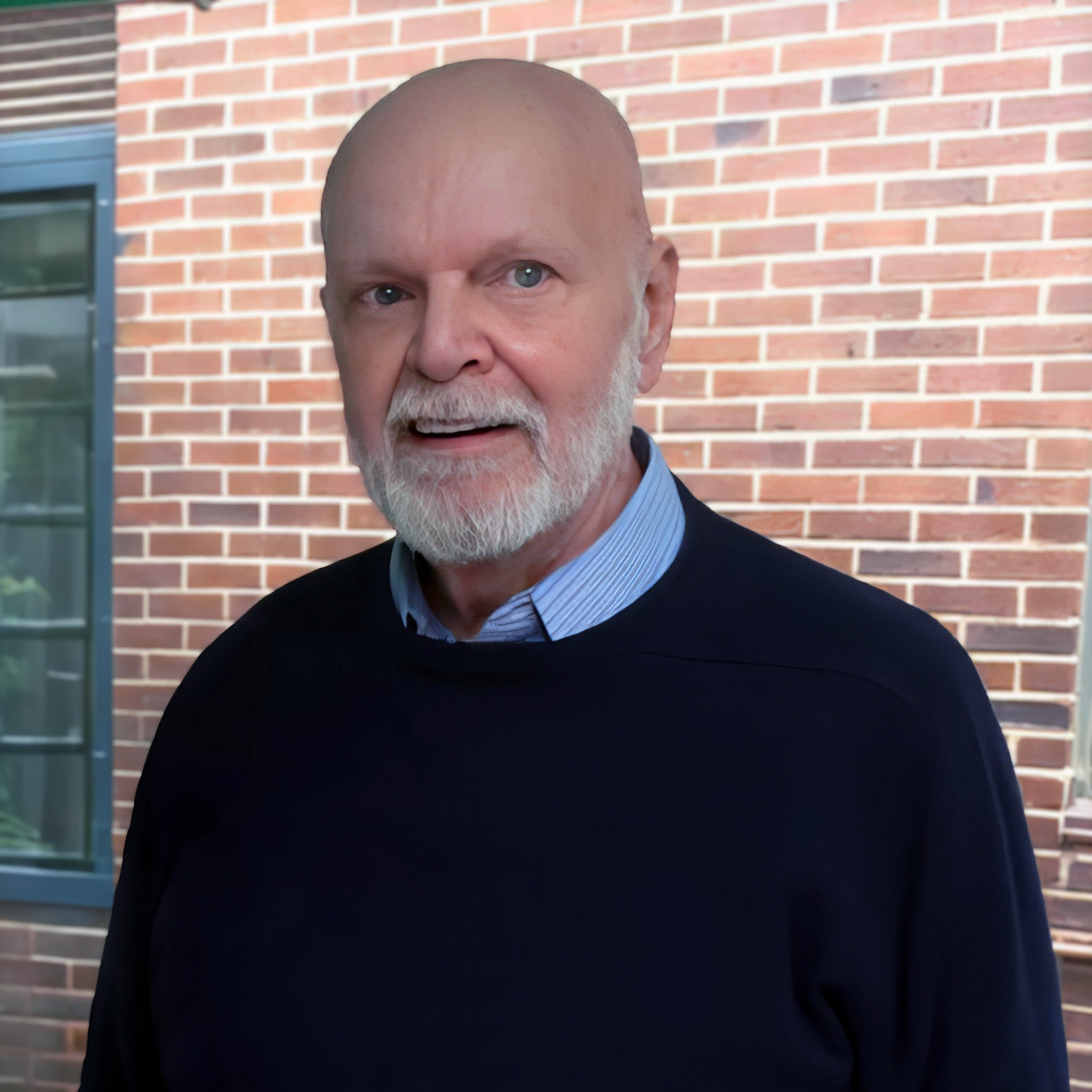
- Granzig in 2024
- Born: July 13, 1939
- Died: November 16, 2019 (aged 80)
- Education: Loyola University Chicago (PhD)
- Occupation: Sexologist
- Scientific career
- Fields: Sexology

William Granzig (July 13, 1939 – November 16, 2019) was an American sexologist.

== Biography ==
Granzig was the president, professor and dean of Clinical Sexology at Maimonides University in North Miami Beach, Florida, which was later moved to Orlando and renamed to the American Academy of Clinical Sexologists and with a final name change in 2014 to the American Academy of Clinical Sexology (AACS). The AACS closed its doors in 2020 shortly after his death. He was the schools director and a professor of the university's sexology program.

In 1986, Granzig founded the American Academy of Clinical Sexologist within Maimonides University.

In 1989, Granzig founded the American Board of Sexology.

He was also a past president of the American Association of Sexuality Educators and Therapists (AASET, now AASECT) from 1978–1980 and was the youngest and first gay president. During his presidency the certification program was started. Dorothy Strauss became the first chair of the newly formed certification committee. The SAR requirement was born out of the premise that at that time, people didn’t talk about sex nor aware of their attitudes of sex and how it affected their sexuality. Patricia Schiller was the executive director at the time and introduced adding therapists into the association and changing the name to include therapists. The board added the “T” onto “AASECT”, including the therapists into the association. Before that, most of the membership consisted of sex educators. He was also the first editor of the journal that was included as a benefit of membership.

He was president of the Sixth World Congress of Sexology, and was an editor of several national and international journals in sexology. In 2002 the German Society for Social-Scientific Sexuality Research (DGSS) awarded Granzig its highest award, the Magnus Hirschfeld Medal for his lifetime contribution of advancing sexological reform worldwide. William Granzig is widely considered an authority on sexology and is frequently quoted in the media. (See Articles quoting William Granzig below.)

== Education ==
Granzig received his Ph.D. from Loyola University Chicago, and is a Lifetime Founding Fellow of the American Academy of Clinical Sexology.

== Works ==
- "The Baby Trap" 1971 by Ellen Peck and William Granzig
- The Parent Test: How to Measure and Develop Your Talent for Parenthood (ISBN 0399120300) (1978) with Ellen Peck
