= Gunter Schmidt =

German sexologist (born 1938)

Gunter Schmidt (born 22 November 1938) is a German sexologist, psychotherapist and social psychologist. He was born in Berlin.

Schmidt was the director of the centre for sexual research in the clinic of the University Medical Center Hamburg-Eppendorf (Eppendorf). He started many projects for research over sexuality and biographies. He was a director of the Deutsche Gesellschaft für Sexualforschung (DGfS) and president of International Academy of Sex Research (IASR).

He is the director of a research project Pregnancy and Abortion by Young Women and a member of the board of directors for the organisation pro familia, an NGO for sexual and reproductive health and rights in Germany.

Together with Martin Dannecker and Volkmar Sigusch, he is editor of Beiträge zur Sexualforschung (87 editions which is published by Psychosozial-Verlag. Schmidt is also co-editor of the magazine Zeitschrift für Sexualforschung in the Georg Thieme Verlag.

Schmidt has written extensively on the sociological status of pedophilia in modern society.

== Books ==
- Studenten-Sexualität (with Hans Giese), 1968
- Arbeiter-Sexualität (with Volkmar Sigusch), 1971
- Jugendsexualität (with Volkmar Sigusch), 1973
- Das große Der Die Das, 1986.
- Das Verschwinden der Sexualmoral, 1996.
- Sexuelle Verhältnisse, Gießen, Psychosozial-Verlag, 1998.
- Die Kinder der sexuellen Revolution (editor), Gießen, Psychosozial-Verlag, 2000.
- Sexualität und Spätmoderne (editor), Gießen, Psychosozial-Verlag, 2002.
- Das neue Der Die Das, Gießen, Psychosozial-Verlag, 2004.
- Spätmoderne Beziehungswelten, (with Silja Matthiesen, Arne Dekker, Kurt Starke), 2006.
