= Reimut Reiche =

Reimut Reiche (born June 20, 1941, in Esslingen am Neckar) is a German sociologist, sexologist, author and psychoanalyst.

In his early years Reiche was an activist in Sozialistischer Deutscher Studentenbund (SDS) and he became president of the SDS in 1966. He was also a member of the group Revolutionärer Kampf in Frankfurt. Reiche studied sociology in Berlin and Frankfurt am Main. In 1973 he published - together with Martin Dannecker - Der gewöhnliche Homosexuelle (The Ordinary Homosexual) to receive his PhD. After he had finished university Reiche worked at the Institut für Sexualwissenschaft, Johann Wolfgang Goethe University, in Frankfurt am Main. In 1991 Reiche got his postdoctoral lecture qualification (Privatdozent) on the subject: Geschlechterspannung [Gender (or Sex) Strain].

From 1973 to 1980 Reiche studied at the Sigmund-Freud-Institut in Frankfurt am Main and he became a psychoanalyst in 1980 (DPV). Since 1980 Reiche has been working as a psychoanalyst in Frankfurt/Main.

== Works ==
- Sexualität und Klassenkampf. Zur Kritik repressiver Entsublimierung, Berlin, 1968.
- Sexuelle Revolution - Erinnerung an einen Mythos, in: Lothar Baier, (1988) Die Früchte der Revolte. Über die Veränderung der politischen Kultur durch die Studentenbewegung, Berlin: Wagenbach, Pages 45–71.
- Geschlechterspannung - Eine psychoanalytische Untersuchung, Frankfurt a. M., (Fischer TB) 1990, 204 pages, new edition: Gießen (Psychosozial-Verlag) 2000.
- Sexualität und Gesellschaft, Festschrift for Volkmar Sigusch (zusammen mit M. Dannecker herausgegeben) Frankfurt a. M. (Campus) 2000, 418 Pages.
- Mutterseelenallein – Kunst, Form und Psychoanalyse, Frankfurt a. M. (Stroemfeld) 2001, 200 Pages.
- Triebschicksal der Gesellschaft. Über den Strukturwandel der Psyche, Frankfurt a. M. (Campus), 2004.
- Psychoanalytische Therapie sexueller Perversionen. In: Volkmar Sigusch (Hrsg.): Sexuelle Störungen und ihre Behandlung. Stuttgart, New York: Thieme 2007, S. 439-464
- Ein Hybrid-Nazi in Analyse in: Jahrbuch der Psychoanalyse, Jg. 60, Verlag Frommann-Holzboog, Stuttgart 2010 ISSN 0075-2363
