= Robert T. Francoeur =

American biologist (1931–2012)

- Born: October 18, 1931; Detroit, Michigan, US
- Died: October 15, 2012 (aged 80); Rockaway, New Jersey, US

Robert Thomas "Bob" Francoeur Ph.D., A.C.S. (October 18, 1931 – October 15, 2012) was an American biologist and sexologist.

== Life and career ==
Francoeur was born on October 18, 1931, in Detroit, Michigan. He earned a B.A. in philosophy and English at Sacred Heart College in 1953, a M.A. in Catholic theology at Saint Vincent College in 1957, a M.S. in biology at the University of Detroit in 1961, a Ph.D. in experimental embryology at the University of Delaware in 1967, and an A.C.S. in sexology at the Institute for the Advanced Study of Human Sexuality in 1979. He received the "Golden Brick Award" from the Center for Family Life Education for outstanding contributions to sexuality education in 2008 and was chosen by the German Society for Social-Scientific Sexuality Research to receive the Magnus Hirschfeld Medal for Sexual Reform in 2008.

Trained in embryology, evolution, theology, and the humanities, Francoeur's main work was to synthesize and integrate the findings of primary sexological researchers. He is the author of twenty-two books, contributor to seventy-eight textbooks, handbooks, and encyclopedias, and the author of fifty-eight technical papers on various aspects of sexuality. His books include The Scent of Eros: Mysteries of Odor in Human Sexuality (1995), Becoming a Sexual Person (1982, 1984, 1991) and Taking Sides: Clashing Views on Controversial Issues in Human Sexuality (1987, 1989, 1991, 1993, 1998, 2000) - two college textbooks, Utopian Motherhood: New Trends in Human Reproduction (1970, 1974, 1977), Eve's New Rib: 20 Faces of Sex, Marriage, and Family (1972), Hot and Cool Sex: Cultures in Conflict (1974), and The Future of Sexual Relations (1974). He is editor-in-chief of The Complete Dictionary of Sexology (1991, 1995) and The International Encyclopedia of Sexuality. A fellow of the Society for the Scientific Study of Sexuality and past president of the Society's Eastern Region, he is also a charter member of the American College of Sexology. He served as professor of biological and allied health sciences at Fairleigh Dickinson University, adjunct professor in the doctoral Program in Human Sexuality at New York University, and professor in the New York University “Sexuality in Two Cultures” program in Copenhagen.

He received the 2008 Magnus Hirschfeld Medal.

== Selected publications ==
Books

- Becoming a Sexual Person (1982) ISBN 0471078484
- International Encyclopedia of Sexuality (1997-2001) ISBN 0826412742
- Utopian Motherhood: New Trends in Human Reproduction
- Biomedical Ethics: A Guide to Decision Making
- The Scent of Eros: Mysteries of Odor in Human Sexuality (with JV Kohl)
- The Complete Dictionary of Sexology
- Hot & Cool Sex: Cultures in Conflict
- Religious Reactions to Alternative Lifestyles
- The Future of Sexual Relations (with AK Francoeur)
- Eve's New Rib: Twenty Faces of Sex, Marriage, and Family
- The Continuum Complete International Encyclopedia of Sexuality (2004) ISBN 0826414885)
- Taking sides: Clashing Views on Controversial Issues in Human Sexuality
- A Descriptive Dictionary and Atlas of Sexology

Articles

- Francoeur, R. T. (1992). "Sexuality and spirituality: The relevance of eastern traditions". SIECUS Report. 20 (4): 1–8. PMID 12343737.
- Francoeur, R. T. (1984). "A structured approach to teaching decision-making skills in biomedical ethics". Journal of Bioethics. 5 (2): 145–154. doi:10.1007/BF01104003. PMID 10271937. S2CID 19495537.
- Francoeur, R. T. (1983). "Teaching decision-making skills in biomedical ethics for the allied health student". Journal of Allied Health. 12 (3): 202–209. PMID 6630023.
- Clayton, F. C.; Francoeur, R. T. (1971). "Some teratogenic effects of vinblastine on the external morphology of Drosophila melanogaster". Oncology. 25 (2): 188–192. doi:10.1159/000224569. PMID 5004581.
- Francoeur, R. T.; Wilber, C. G. (1968). "Amphibian regeneration and the teratogenic effects of vinblastine". Oncology. 22 (4): 302–310. doi:10.1159/000224462. PMID 5751113.
- Francoeur, R. T. (1968). "General and selective inhibition of amphibian regeneration by vinblastine and dactinomycin". Oncology. 22 (2): 218–226. doi:10.1159/000224452. PMID 5688434.

Talk Show Appearances

- The David Frost Show January 5, 1971; Season 3, Episode 69
- The Dick Cavett Show May 23, 1972; Episode 257 on ABC
- The Dick Cavett Show June 20, 1972; Episode 353 on ABC; with Robert Rimmer and Barbara Williamson
