= Ellen Peck =

American feminist and writer

- Born: Ellen Remsburg; August 24, 1942; Normal, Illinois
- Died: March 15, 1995 (aged 52); New York City, New York
- Occupations: Middle school teacher; writer; childfree activist
- Movement: Childfree
- Spouse: William Peck (divorced)
- Parent(s): C. M. and Genevieve Remsburg

Ellen Remsburg Peck (August 24, 1942 – March 15, 1995) was an American feminist, writer, and childfree activist.

== Early life ==
Born Ellen Remsburg to C. M. and Genevieve Remsburg of Normal, Illinois, Peck attended University High School and graduated in 1960. A high achiever, she took leading roles in her school's political, acting and debate arenas.

== Career ==
After finishing college, Peck became an eighth-grade English teacher at Pimlico Junior High School in Baltimore, Maryland. In 1969, however, she became more widely known for writing a teenage girl's guide to romance, health, fashion, and beauty called, humorously, How to Get a Teen-Age Boy, and What to Do With Him When You Get Him, a sort of Sex and the Single Girl for teens. At the time the book was taken seriously, but later Ms. Peck claimed it was written merely as "humor" and it is usually missing from subsequent lists of her books. The book was quite popular, selling more than 50,000 copies in hard-cover, and during the 1970s she wrote an advice column for teen-agers, called "The Column," which appeared in The Baltimore Sun and was nationally syndicated. She subsequently wrote another book providing contraceptive information and called Sex and Birth Control: a Guide for the Young (1973; rev. ed. 1981), with E. James Lieberman, M.D.

In 1971, she wrote The Baby Trap with William Granzig, which became one of the first and most prominent books about the emerging childfree movement. In 1972, Peck and Shirley Radl founded the National Organization for Non-Parents (N.O.N.), an advocacy organization for men and women who choose not to have children. She later wrote several more books on parenthood and was, for a time, a rather prominent childfree advocate, even appearing on The Tonight Show where she exchanged views with Joe Namath.

== Activism ==
In 1977, Peck became an associate of the Women's Institute for Freedom of the Press (WIFP). WIFP is an American nonprofit publishing organization. The organization works to increase communication between women and connect the public with forms of women-based media.

== Personal life ==
Ms. Peck was married in 1965 to William Peck, head of an advertising agency in Baltimore. She never had children and eventually divorced. She died of cancer on March 15, 1995, in New York.

== Books ==
- How to Get a Teen-Age Boy, and What to Do With Him When You Get Him, (ISBN 978-0870350122)(1969).
- The Baby Trap, (ISBN 978-0523009032)(1971), with William Granzig
- Sex and Birth Control: a Guide for the Young (1973; rev. ed. 1981; Spanish tr.), with E. James Lieberman, M.D.
- Pronatalism: The Myth of Mom and Apple Pie (ISBN 0-690-00498-2)(1974), an anthology of writings on pronatalism and its effects on society, co-edited by Judith Senderowitz
- A Funny Thing Happened on the Way to Equality (ISBN 0-13-345512-2)(1975), with William Granzig
- The Joy of the Only Child (ISBN 0-440-04262-3)(1977)
- The Parent Test: How to Measure and Develop Your Talent for Parenthood (ISBN 0399120300)(1978), with William Granzig.
