= German Society for Sexual Research =

German professional association for sexology

Logo of the DGfS

The German Society for Sexual Research (German: Deutsche Gesellschaft für Sexualforschung, DGfS) is a German sexology research society with a place of activity at the University Medical Center Hamburg-Eppendorf. The association is a member of the Association of the Scientific Medical Societies in Germany.

As an interdisciplinary institution, it houses representatives of a number of different subjects: medicine, psychology, psychoanalysis, pedagogy, sociology, law, history, cultural studies and others.

== History ==
At the instigation of the sexologist Hans Giese, it was founded in 1950 with the aim of promoting sexual science research, teaching and practice. The first chairman was Hans Bürger-Prinz, a former member of the Nazi Party and the Brownshirts and “hereditary health expert” at the Nazi Hereditary Health Court, where he decided on the forced sterilization of people who were classified as having hereditary illnesses, and advocated that the "congenitally diseased" should be singled out from society.

== Scientific and socio-political engagement ==
Through numerous research reports, expert opinions and public statements, the DGfS has repeatedly influenced the legislation and supreme court decisions in the past. This is particularly true of the reforms of sexual criminal law and the Transsexuals Act, which was created under the essential influence of the then chairman Volkmar Sigusch. Publications of members of the DGfS touch on such diverse topics as the theory of sexuality, the history of sexology, clinical research, women's and gender studies, social science research and sexual forensic research.

== Further education and training ==
A central concern of the association is to improve the treatment of patients with sexual disorders and conflicts. For this purpose, three curricula were developed, on the basis of which further training is carried out in different cities The DGfS also strives intensively to enforce qualified continuing sexual science further education and training for psychologists and doctors.

== Publication bodies ==
The association has two publication bodies:

- The monograph series Beiträge zur Sexualforschung (English: Contributions to Sexual Research) has been published since 1952 and is currently published by Martin Dannecker, Hertha Richter-Appelt and Andreas Hill By July 2015, 100 volumes of contributions were published, the first 70 volumes until 1999 by Enke-Verlag. Since 2000, the articles have been published by Psychosozial-Verlag.
- The Zeitschrift für Sexualforschung (English: Journal of Sexual Research, ZfS) is published four times a year by Thieme-Verlag. It is currently published by Peer Briken, Johannes Fuß, Timo O. Nieder and Julia Velten.

In addition, statements are published in political institutions and courts, as well as statements and inputs Among them, the sexual policy opinions occupy a special place, for example, in 2004 on the introduction of a subsequently ordered safekeeping 2009 on the reform of the Transsexuals Act or in 2011 on the EU Child Pornography Directive.

== See also ==
- German Society for Social-Scientific Sexuality Research
