= Eberhard Schorsch =

German physician and author

Eberhard Schorsch (30 December 1935 – 14 November 1991) was a German physician, psychotherapist, psychiatrist, author and sexologist.

Schorsch was born in Leipzig. After finishing school, he studied medicine and psychology at university. He worked as director of the section for sex research at the Psychiatrische und Nervenklinik of the University Medical Center Hamburg-Eppendorf. From 1982 to 1985, he was the president of the organisation Deutsche Gesellschaft für Sexualforschung (DGfS) and co-editor of Zeitschrift für Sexualforschung. He died in 1991 in Hamburg.

== Works ==
- Schorsch, E.: Untersuchungen über das Harn und Serumionogramm bei der Pyurie der Säuglinge. 1962.
- Schorsch, E.: Die Sexualität in den endogen phasischen Psychosen. 1967.
- Schmidt, G., V. Sigusch and E. Schorsch: Tendenzen der Sexualforschung. (Für Hans Giese]. 1970.
- Schorsch, E.: Sexualstraftäter.1971.
- Schorsch, E. and G. Schmidt: Ergebnisse zur Sexualforschung. Arbeiten aus dem Hamburger Institut für Sexualforschung.1975.
- Schorsch, E. and N. Becker: Angst, Lust, Zerstörung. Sadismus als soziales und kriminelles Handeln. Zur Psychodynamik sexueller Tötungen. 1977.
- Schorsch, E., G. Galedary, A. Haag, M. Hauch and H. Lohse: Perversion als Straftat. Dynamik und Psychotherapie. 1985.
- Jäger, H. and E. Schorsch: Sexualwissenschaft und Strafrecht.1987.
- Pfäfflin, F. and E. Schorsch (Hrsg.): Sexualpolitische Kontroversen. Ergebnisse der 15. Wissenschaftlichen Tagung der Deutschen Gesellschaft für Sexualforschung. 1987.
- Schorsch, E., G. Galedary, A. Haag, M. Hauch and H. Lohse: Sex offenders. Dynamics and psychotherapeutic strategies. 1990.
- Schorsch, E.: Kurzer Prozeß? Ein Sexualstraftäter vor Gericht. 1991.
- Schorsch, E.: Perversion, Liebe, Gewalt. 1993.
