= Liu Dalin =

Professor of sociology (1932–2022)

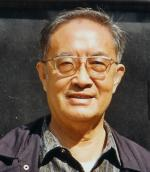

Liu Dalin, also sometimes Dalin Liu or Ta-lin Liu, (Chinese: 刘达临; 2 June 1932 – 17 December 2022) was a Chinese professor of sociology at Shanghai University, who pioneered the field of sexology.

Liu was born on 2 June 1932. In 1989–90, he helped conduct a nationwide survey on sexual behavior and attitudes in China, not unlike the Kinsey Report in the United States. A report on the survey's outcomes was first published in 1992 in Shanghai; in 1997 Liu published the English edition Sexual Behavior in Modern China (ISBN 0-8264-0886-9). Also in 1997, he opened China's first sex museum in Shanghai; it has since moved to Tongli.

Liu won the Magnus Hirschfeld Medal for his research in sexology in 1994.

Liu published several books on the history of erotica in China:

- History of Erotica in China (2004), People's Daily Press, ISBN 7-80153-776-9, (in Chinese).
- Pictorial History of Erotica.
- World Sex Culture (2005), China Friendship Press, ISBN 7-5057-2110-0, (in Chinese).

Liu died on 17 December 2022, at the age of 90.
