= Karina Content =

Karina Content is the pseudonym of Karina Schaapman (born 6 June 1960 in Leiden), a Dutch writer and politician affiliated with the Labour Party (Netherlands).

In 2005 Amma Asante (also a councilor for the Labour Party (Netherlands)) and Content, wrote a report, "Het onzichtbare zichtbaar gemaakt" (Making the Invisible Visible). Schaapman had once been a prostitute and was getting information about the influx of organized crime and violence into Prostitution in the Netherlands. Other reports came out around the same time. They concluded that a large number of prostitutes in Amsterdam were being forced to work and were being abused by pimps and criminal gangs, and that the goals of legalization were failing.

== Publications ==
- Schoolstrijd (2000)
- Zonder moeder ("Without Mother", autobiographical, 2004)
- Het onzichtbare zichtbaar gemaakt ("Making the invisible visible", report, 2005)
- Hoerenlopen is niet normaal ("Visiting whores is not normal", pamphlet, 2007)
- Het Muizenhuis - Sam & Julia ("The Mouse Mansion - Sam & Julia", 2011)
- Het Muizenhuis - Sam & Julia in het theater ("The Mouse Mansion - Sam & Julia in the theater", 2012)
- Het Muizenhuis - Sam & Julia het grote feest ("The Mouse Mansion - Sam & Julia and the big party", 2013) This book was a gift for the royal princesses of the Netherlands when Willem-Alexander of the Netherlands was crowned king. 30,000 children in Amsterdam also received this gift for the inauguration.
- Het Muizenhuis - Sam & Julia in het circus ("The Mouse Mansion - Sam & Julia in the circus", 2013)
