= Rolf Gindorf =

German sexologist (1939–2016)

- Born: 14 May 1939; Cologne, Nazi Germany
- Died: 26 March 2016 (aged 76)
- Education: University of Düsseldorf; Institute for Advanced Study of Human Sexuality; Maimonides University
- Scientific career
- Fields: Sexology
- Workplaces: DGSS-Institut

Rolf Gindorf (14 May 1939 – 26 March 2016) was a German sexologist. He was a member of Mensa. In 1971 he founded the German Society for Social-Scientific Sexuality Research.

He received the 2004 Magnus Hirschfeld Medal.

== Publications ==
Gindorf's published works include:

- Sexology Today. A Brief Introduction. Düsseldorf 1993, 141 pp. (with E. J. Haeberle)
- Bisexualities. The Ideology and Practice of Sexual Contact with Both Men and Women. New York 1998, 270 pp. (with E. J. Haeberle)
