= Herman Musaph =

Dutch psychiatrist, dermatologist and sexologist

Herman Musaph (Dutch: Heijman Musaph) (7 January 1915 – 18 November 1992) was a Dutch Holocaust survivor, psychiatrist, dermatologist and sexologist.

Musaph was born in Amsterdam. He studied medicine at the University of Amsterdam. In 1977 Musaph became Professor of Medicine at the University of Utrecht. He wrote various works on dermatology.

Musaph founded the Dutch Society for Sexual Reform and he wrote the "Handbook of Sexology".

He was the winner of the Magnus Hirschfeld Medal in 1990. The Herman Musaph Foundation for Psychodermatology is named in his honor.

Herman was married to Rosetta Andriesse and had no children.
