= Paidika =

Dutch journal

- Discipline: Pedophilia, sexual attraction to minors
- Language: English

Publication details
- History: 1987-1995
- Frequency: Quarterly

Standard abbreviations
- ISO 4: Paidika

Paidika: The Journal of Paedophilia was an English-language Dutch quarterly journal that published studies on pedophilia from a sociological and historical perspective from 1987 to 1995. The publication had a number of academics in its editorial board, including San Francisco State University psychology professor John Paul De Cecco.
