= Erwin J. Haeberle =

German sexologist (1936–2021)

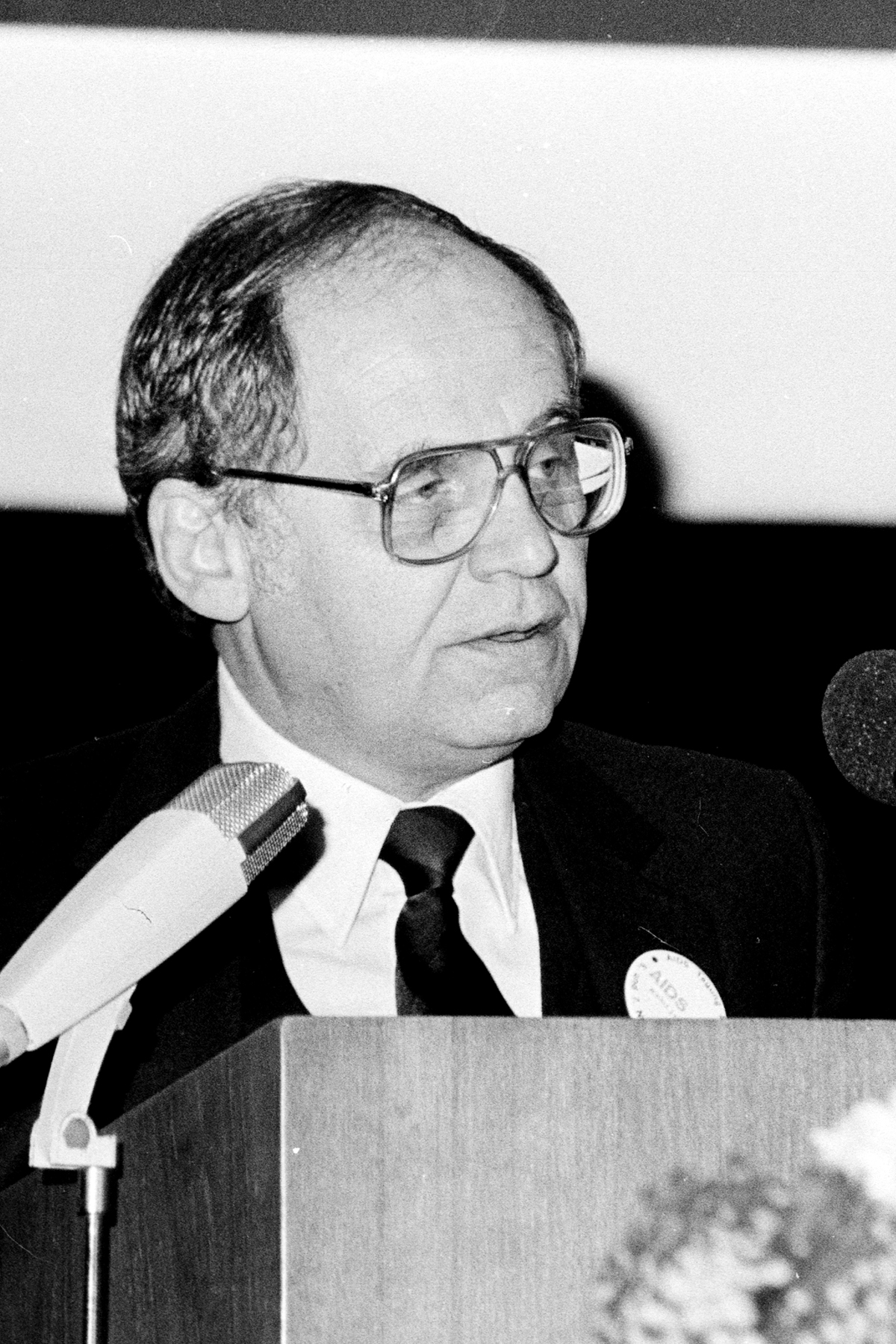
Haeberle in 1986

Erwin J. Haeberle (30 March 1936 – 1 October 2021) was a German social scientist and sexologist.

== Biography ==
Haeberle was born on 30 March 1936 in Dortmund, Germany. From 1956 to 1963 he studied drama, German, English literature, and French literature at the University of Cologne, University of Freiburg, University of Glasgow, and University of Heidelberg. He received a M.A. in 1964 from Cornell and a Ph.D. in 1966 from Heidelberg. Haeberle was a postdoctoral fellow at Yale and U.C. Berkeley from 1966 to 1972. He earned an Ed. D. in sexology from the Institute for Advanced Study of Human Sexuality in 1977, where he was a professor from 1977 to 1988. During this tenure, he also was a research associate at the Kinsey Institute for Research in Sex, Gender and Reproduction of Indiana University from 1982 to 1984, a visiting professor in the medical school of the University of Kiel from 1983 to 1984, a distinguished visiting professor in the department of biology at San Francisco State University in 1984, and a visiting professor in the medical school of the University of Geneva from 1984 to 1985. He then moved on to Director of Information & Documentation at the AIDS Center of the Federal Health Office in Berlin from 1988 to 1994.

Haeberle was a founding member and first Secretary General of the European Federation of Sexology in the early 1990s. From 1991 to 1994 Haeberle was a visiting professor at Humboldt University and from 1994 to 2001 he was founder and director of the Archive of Sexology at the Robert Koch Institute. After his retirement from government service in 2001, he continued his work privately as director of the Magnus Hirschfeld Archive for Sexology, which he financed himself and which ran on the server of Humboldt University.

In January 2003, he put together an early freely accessible course (MOOC) online. In 2004 he presented it in Beijing's Great Hall of the People. Subsequently, it was, together with other courses, translated into Chinese. Today, an entire "open access" curriculum of six courses (six Semesters) on sexual health is available in seven languages: English, Spanish, Portuguese, Chinese (both simplified and traditional), Russian, Czech, and Hungarian. Haeberle's online Archive now offers sexual health information in a total of 15 languages. In July 2013 he left the server of Humboldt University and continued on a private server of his own as Director of his still personally funded Archive for Sexology. Since October 2009, his print library and collections have been available as Haeberle-Hirschfeld Archive at the central library of Humboldt-University In 2005, he joined the University of Hong Kong as an honorary professor, first at the Faculty of Medicine, then at the Family Institute. From 1986 to 2002 he was president of the German Society for Social-Scientific Sexuality Research.

Haeberle died on 1 October 2021, at the age of 85.
