= Manfred Bruns =

German federal prosecutor and gay rights advocate (1934–2019

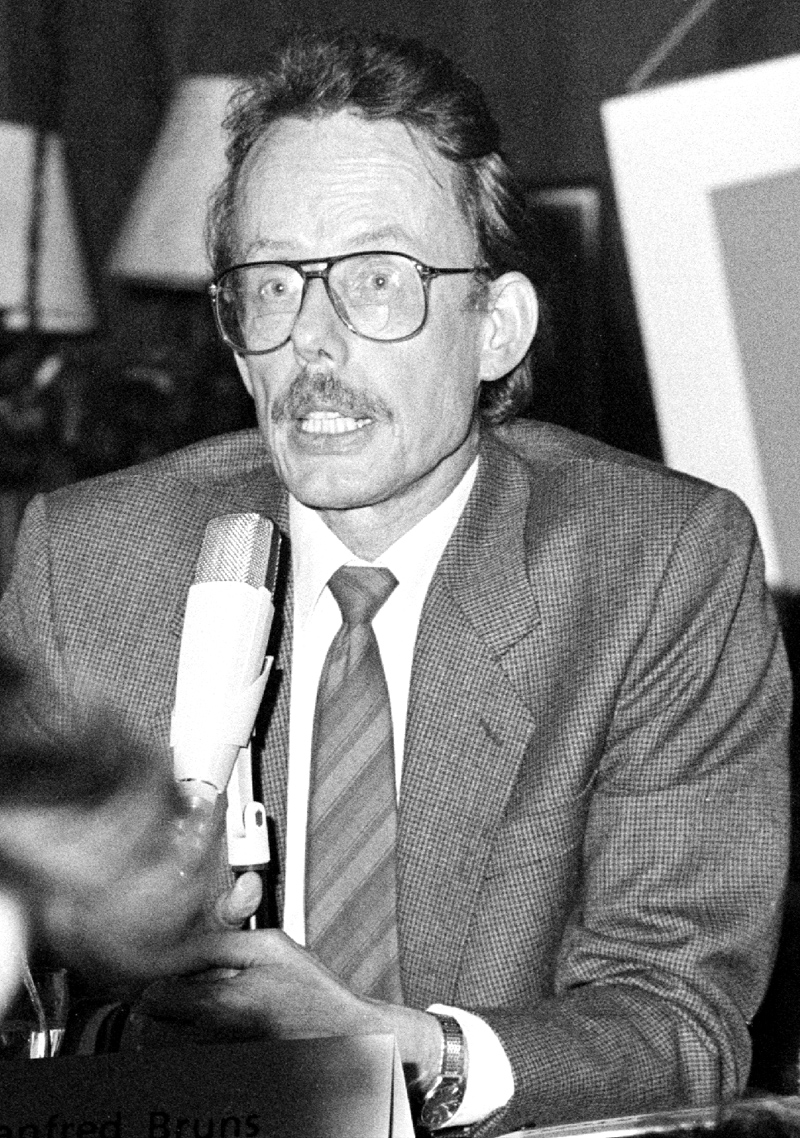
Bruns in 1986

Manfred Bruns (1934 – 22 October 2019) was a federal prosecutor at the Federal Court of Justice of Germany, and a famous German gay civil rights activist. He was until 2016 a member of the Board of Directors of the Lesbian and Gay Association (LSVD), today LSVD⁺ – Federation Queer Diversity.

== Early life and career ==
Bruns was born in 1934, in Linz am Rhein in Rhineland-Palatinate, and was brought up in a conservative Catholic household. For years he concealed the possibility he might be gay. In 1961, he got married and had three children. Bruns worked as a prosecutor at West Germany's Constitutional Court in Karlsruhe. He came out to his family in the early 1980s, and then to his work He never initiated divorce proceedings with his wife.

In 1985, he came out on live TV when he appeared on a TV show to talk about the subject of homosexuality. The show's host inquired about his relationship with his wife, making an implication there was a "special arrangement" with her. After he came out on the show, it was a turning point that helped to define Germany's political gay and lesbian movement.

From then on, Bruns was determined to eliminate "paragraph 175", that was defined by law as "unnatural sexual offenses" between two men. Together with Volker Beck and Günter Dworek, they worked to eradicate the so called gay paragraph, which could imprison men to a possible sentence of six months in prison. The arcane law was established in 1871, under the German command. When the Nazis were in power, paragraph 175 was strictly enforced. On 11 July 1994, the paragraph was finally struck down.

In 1994 he was awarded the Federal Cross of Merit 1st Class, and in 2002, he received the Magnus Hirschfeld Medal.

Bruns died on 22 October 2019, at the age of 85.
