= John Paul De Cecco =

American academic (1925–2017)

- Born: April 18, 1925; Erie, Pennsylvania, U.S.
- Died: November 2, 2017 (aged 92); San Francisco, California, U.S.
- Education: Allegheny College; University of Pennsylvania; Michigan State University
- Occupations: Professor of psychology, author, editor

John Paul De Cecco (April 18, 1925 – November 2, 2017) was an American academic. He was a professor of psychology at San Francisco State University, the editor-in-chief of the Journal of Homosexuality from 1975 to 2009, and a "pioneer of sexuality studies."

== Early life ==
John Paul De Cecco was born on April 18, 1925, in Erie, Pennsylvania. He had four siblings, and he was of Italian descent. His father was a restaurant and property owner. His three maternal uncles were members of the Mafia who "married prostitutes."

De Cecco graduated from Allegheny College, where he earned a Bachelor of Science degree in biology in 1946. He subsequently earned a master's degree and a Ph.D. in European history from the University of Pennsylvania, in 1949 and 1953 respectively. He took additional coursework in educational psychology at Michigan State University. He also attended Columbia University in 1968–1970.

== Academic career and political activism ==
De Cecco became an assistant professor of education and psychology at San Francisco State University in 1960. He eventually became a full professor of psychology.

De Cecco took part in the opposition to United States involvement in the Vietnam War. He was a member of the Gay Activists Alliance and the faculty adviser of the Gay Students Coalition at SFSU, co-founded by Mark Thompson. With Michael G. Shively, De Cecco was the co-founder of the Center for Homosexual Education, Evaluation and Research (CHEER) at SFSU in 1975. De Cecco served as editor-in-chief of the Journal of Homosexuality from 1975 to 2009. Additionally, he was a "member and sponsor" of the GLBT Historical Society.

De Cecco was the author of several books.

== Personal life, controversies, death and legacy ==
De Cecco resided in the Potrero Hill neighborhood of San Francisco, where he died on November 2, 2017, at age 92. He was described as a "pioneer of sexuality studies" who had been "in the forefront of three decades of change in gay-related academia".

He received the 1992 Magnus Hirschfeld Medal.

De Cecco served on the editorial board of ''Paidika: The Journal of Pedophilia' (1987–1995), a Dutch quarterly journal that published studies of pedophilia.

== Selected works ==
- De Cecco, John Paul; Sycamore, Matt Bernstein (2014), Tricks and Treats: Sex Workers Write About Their Clients, Taylor and Francis, ISBN 978-1317713005
- De Cecco, John Paul; Letellier, Patrick; Island, David (2013), Men Who Beat the Men Who Love Them: Battered Gay Men and Domestic Violence, Taylor and Francis, ISBN 978-1317765509
- De Cecco, John Paul; Wright, Les (2013), The Bear Book: Readings in the History and Evolution of a Gay Male Subculture, Taylor and Francis, ISBN 978-1317712404
- De Cecco, John Paul; Peniston, William (2012), Pederasts and Others: Urban Culture and Sexual Identity in Nineteenth-Century Paris, Haworth Gay & Lesbian Studies., Taylor and Francis, ISBN 978-1136572920
- De Cecco, John Paul; Shively, Michael G (1985), Origins of Sexuality and Homosexuality, Harrington Park Press, ISBN 9780918393005
- De Cecco, John Paul (1984), Homophobia: An Overview, Journal of Homosexuality, vol. 10 (1984) no. 1-2.; Research on Homosexuality, vol. 10, Haworth Press, ISBN 9780866563567
- De Cecco, John Paul; Richards, Arlene (1974), Growing Uses of School Conflict, Aberdeen Press, ISBN 9780879450298
- De Cecco, John Paul (1967). The Psychology of Language, Thought, and Instruction: Readings. New York: Holt, Rinehart & Winston.
- De Cecco, John Paul, ed. (1964). Educational Technology: Readings in Programmed Instruction. New York: Holt, Rinehart and Winston.
- De Cecco, John Paul (1963), Human Learning in the School: (Readings in educational psychology), New York, OCLC 1011145672
