= Gaston Vorberg =

German physician

Gaston Vorberg (1875-1947) was a German physician, medical historian and sexologist. He also translated Latin and Italian texts into German.

Vorberg was born on 23 January 1875 in Cologne. He studied medicine at the University of Freiburg and completed his studies in 1903 with a doctoral thesis on the clinical differential diagnosis of cerebrospinal multiple sclerosis. He worked as a doctor specialized in nervous and emotional disorders in Munich and later distinguished himself in the field of sex research. He also used the pseudonym, 'Montanus'.

Vorberg wrote several medical books, for instance, an advice for nervous people (1919) and a study on the origin of syphilis (1924), in which he endeavoured to demonstrate that syphilis was already at home in Europe before the discovery of America and that only Emperor Maximilian's 'Blasphemy Edict' of 1495 stamped the disease as a "previously unknown" serious epidemic. He also dealt with the harlots of Venice in his Venezianischer Dirnenspiegel (1923), a kind of counterpart to William Hogarth's A Harlot's Progress. His book on sex life in ancient times (1925) dealt with Greek and Roman customs.

Vorberg also wrote a study on Guy de Maupassant's disease (1908) and in 1933 he described Friedrich Nietzsche's illness as syphilis plus psychopathy in the manner of the "Polish rumor." In his essay about spoilers of language and gossips (1917) he compared Gottfried Benn, the author of the experimental drama Karandasch, with the inhabitant of a madhouse. Furthermore, he translated masterpieces of neo-Latin love poetry into German (1920).

Vorberg died in 1947.

== List of publications ==
- Zur klinischen Differentialdiagnose der Sklerosis multiplex cerebrospinalis, Inaugural-Dissertation zur Erlangung der medizinischen Doktorwürde, Albert-Ludwigs-Universität Freiburg im Breisgau, 1903.
- Freiheit oder gesundheitliche Überwachung der Gewerbsunzucht? Zeitgemässe Betrachtung, Munich: Verlag der ärztlichen Rundschau Otto Gmelin, 1904.
- Kurpfuscher: Eine zeitgemässe Betrachtung, Leipzig and Vienna: Franz Deuticke, 1905.
- Dementia Paralytica und Syphilis, Leipzig and Vienna: Franz Deuticke, 1906.
- Briefe eines Arztes: Gift oder Heilmittel im Unglück? Munich: Verlag der Aerztlichen Rundschau, 1907.
- Guy De Maupassants Krankheit [Grenzfragen des Nerven- und Seelenlebens, vol. LX], Wiesbaden: Bergmann, 1908.
- Museum eroticum Neapolitanum: Ein Beitrag zum Geschlechtsleben der Römer [1910].
- „Der Alte Fritz und die Ärzte“, Archiv für die Geschichte der Naturwissenschaften und der Technik, 6 (1913), pp. 407–411. https://archive.org/details/ArchivFuerDieGeschichteDerNaturwissenschaftenVol6yr1913/page/n429/mode/2up
- Sprachverderber und Schwätzer: Ein Weckruf, Munich: Josef Mayinger, 1917.
- Ratschläge für Nervenleidende: Ein Katechismus für Neurastheniker, Stuttgart: Ernst Heinrich Moritz, 1919, 4th edition, 1924.
- "Der Klatsch über das Geschlechtsleben Friedrichs II., Der Fall Jean-Jacques Rousseau," in Abhandlungen aus dem Gebiete der Sexualforschung, vol. III, no. 6 (1920–21), pp. 5–30.
- (trans.), Meisterstücke neulateinischer Liebesdichtung, Munich: Georg Müller, 1920.
- Die Erotik der Antike in Kleinkunst und Keramik, Munich: Georg Müller, 1921.
- Die geschlechtliche Unfähigkeit des Mannes: Beobachtungen und Betrachtungen, Munich: Verlag der Aerztlichen Rundschau Otto Gmelin, 1921.
- Zusammenbruch: Heinrich Leuthold, Alfred Rethel, Vincent van Gogh, Munich: Verlag der Aerztlichen Rundschau Otto Gmelin, 1922.
- Zusammenbruch: Nikolaus Lenau, Friedrich Nietzsche, Guy de Maupassant, Hugo Wolf, Munich: Verlag der Aerztlichen Rundschau Otto Gmelin, 1922.
- Jean-Jacques Rousseau, Lord Byron, Karl Stauffer, Munich: Verlag der Aerztlichen Rundschau Otto Gmelin, 1923.
- (ed.) Petronius, Satyrikon, Munich: Arche Verlag, 1923.
- Venezianischer Dirnenspiegel, Munich: Verlag der Aerztlichen Rundschau Otto Gmelin, 1923.
- Über den Ursprung der Syphilis: Quellengeschichtliche Untersuchungen, Stuttgart: Julius Püttmann, 1924.
- (ed.), Aloyse Cynthio Degli Fabritii, Art-und-Dichter in Venedig, Stuttgart: Julius Püttmann, 1924.
- (trans.) Des Lorenzo Veniero gereimte Preistafel von der venedischen Huldinnen Liebesgunst nebst venezianischem Sittenspiegel, Munich: Georg Müller 1924.
- Über das Geschlechtsleben im Altertum [Sexualwissenschaftliche Dokumente, vol. 3], Stuttgart: Julius Püttmann, 1925.
- Von Seelenkranken, Von Ansteckung, Von Geschlechtsnöten, Stuttgart: Julius Püttmann, 1928.
- (ed.) Glossarium Eroticum, Stuttgart: Julius Püttmann, 1928–32. Reprinted Hanau: Müller & Kiepenheuer, 1965.
- Über Friedrich Nietzsches Krankheit und Zusammenbruch, Berlin: Julius Püttmann, 1933.
- Luxu und Voluptate, edited by Richard Wunderer, Schmieden: Freyja-Verlag, 1966.
- Ars erotica veterum. Das Geschlechtsleben im Altertum, Hanau: Müller & Kiepenheuer, 1968.
