= Martin Dannecker =

German sexologist and author

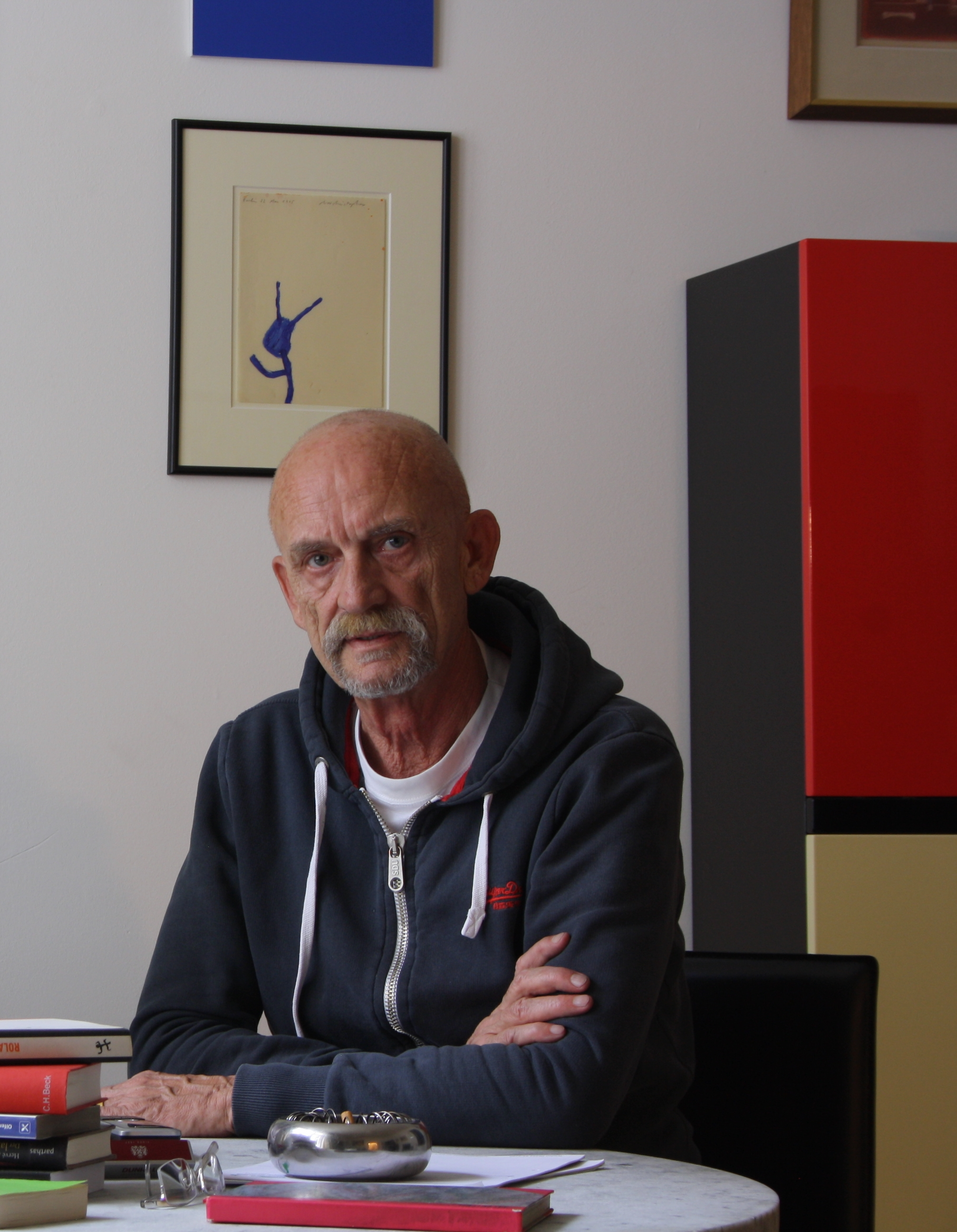
Martin Dannecker 2011

Martin Dannecker (born 1942 in Oberndorf am Neckar) is a German sexologist and author.

Dannecker was born in Oberndorf am Neckar. After his schooling, he initially entered industrial retailing and later trained as an actor at a theater school in Stuttgart. During this time, Dannecker came out and started to read literature on homosexuality. In 1966, Dannecker moved to Frankfurt am Main, and he enrolled at the university with a focus on philosophy, sociology, and psychology. In 1974, he and psychoanalyst Reimut Reiche published Der gewöhnliche Homosexuelle, a wide-ranging empirical study of German homosexuals.

Dannecker collaborated with director Rosa von Praunheim on the film Nicht der Homosexuelle ist pervers, sondern die Situation, in der er lebt. This film was premiered on WDR Television in 1972 and is widely credited with launching the modern German gay rights movement.

From 1977 to 2005, Dannecker was employed at the Institut für Sexualwissenschaft, located at the University of Frankfurt clinic, where he offered courses on sexual counseling as well as homosexuality and film studies. He authored numerous articles and books on homosexuality, HIV/AIDS and sexual orientation. He also participated in workshops and conferences on film and LGBT topics. In 2005, Dannecker retired and moved from Frankfurt to Berlin.

Dannecker is a member of the board of directors at the organisation Queer Nations e.V.. Along with Gunter Schmidt and Volkmar Sigusch, he is editor of Beiträge zur Sexualforschung, which is published in Psychosozial-Verlag. He continues to offer workshops on sexual counseling, particularly in Austria.

== Works ==
- Schwule Regungen — schwule Bewegungen, Berlin : Verlag Rosa Winkel, c 1985.
- Der Homosexuelle und die Homosexualität, Frankfurt am Main : Europäische Verlagsanstalt, 1986.
- Das Drama der Sexualität, Frankfurt am Main : Athenäum, 1987.
- Der Körper und seine Sprachen, Frankfurt am Main : Athenäum, 1989.
- Homosexuelle Männer und AIDS, - Stuttgart : Kohlhammer Verlag, 1990.
- Der homosexuelle Mann im Zeichen von Aids, Hamburg : Klein, 1991.
- Das Drama der Sexualität, Hamburg : Europ. Verl.-Anst., 1992.
- Vorwiegend homosexuell, Hamburg : MännerschwarmSkript-Verl., 1997.
- Sexualität und Gesellschaft, Frankfurt/Main : Campus-Verl., 2000.
- 100 Jahre Freuds "Drei Abhandlungen zur Sexualtheorie", Gießen : Psychosozial-Verl., 2005.
- Fortwährende Eingriffe. Aufsätze, Vorträge und Reden zu HIV und AIDS aus vier Jahrzehnten, Hamburg : Männerschwarm-Verl., 2019.
