= International Encyclopedia of Sexuality =

Reference work

- Editors: Robert T. Francoeur; Raymond J. Noonan
- Language: English
- Publication date: 1997–2001
- Media type: Print
- ISBN: 0826412742

The International Encyclopedia of Sexuality is a four-volume reference work on human sexuality, organized by country. It is also available online. It was published between 1997 and 2001 and was edited by Robert T. Francoeur and Raymond J. Noonan with contributions from academics worldwide. An updated one-volume version was published in 2004 under the title The Continuum Complete International Encyclopedia of Sexuality (ISBN 0826414885) and was hosted on The Kinsey Institute's website.
