= Oswalt Kolle =

German sex educator (1928–2010)

- Born: October 2, 1928
- Died: September 24, 2010 (aged 81)

Oswalt Kolle (2 October 1928 – 24 September 2010) was a German-Dutch sex educator, who became famous during the late 1960s and early 1970s for his numerous pioneering books and films on human sexuality. His work was translated into all major languages, while his films found an audience of 140 million worldwide. In his 1997 book Open to Both Sides he came out as bisexual.

He was awarded the Magnus Hirschfeld Medal in 2000.

Kolle was born on 2 October 1928 in Kiel and grew up in Frankfurt.

He had lived in the relatively more sexually liberal city of Amsterdam, Netherlands since the 1970s with his three children to escape harassment of his family by conservative German journalists, and was also a Dutch citizen. His wife died in 2000.

Kolle died on 24 September 2010 in Amsterdam, at the age of 81.
