= Volkmar Sigusch =

German sexologist

Volkmar Sigusch (11 June 1940 – 7 February 2023) was a German sexologist, physician and sociologist. From 1973 to 2006, he was the director of the Institut für Sexualwissenschaft (Institute for Sexual Science) at the clinic of Goethe University Frankfurt.

Sigusch was born in Bad Freienwalde. He studied medicine, psychology and philosophy (under Max Horkheimer and Theodor W. Adorno) in Frankfurt am Main, Berlin and Hamburg. In 1966 and 1972, Sigusch obtained his German M. D. and PhD at the university in Hamburg. He then worked from 1973 as a professor at Goethe University. In 1972, Sigusch founded the Institute for Sexology at the University Hospital in Frankfurt and was its director until his retirement and the closure of the institute in 2006.

Sigusch wrote several books on sociology, psychology and sexual medicine. He was the founder and, from 1988, co-editor of the scientific, peer-reviewed journal Zeitschrift für Sexualforschung (Thieme Verlag Stuttgart and New York) and wrote articles for various magazines. From 1979 to 1986, he edited the cultural magazine Sexualität konkret.

In a 1991 publication, Die Transsexuellen und unser nosomorpher Blick ("Transsexuals and our nosomorphic view"), Sigusch coined the term cissexual (zissexuell in German). As an antonym to transsexual, cissexual refers to a person whose gender identity matches their sex.

== Works ==
Sigusch wrote over 850 scientific articles and 51 books, including:

- Das Vorurteil gegenüber sexuell devianten Gruppen, 1967 (with Gunter Schmidt).
- Exzitation und Orgasmus bei der Frau, 1970.
- Tendenzen der Sexualforschung, 1970 (with Gunter Schmidt and Eberhard Schorsch).
- Arbeiter-Sexualität, 1971 (with Gunter Schmidt).
- Ergebnisse zur Sexualmedizin, 1972, 1973.
- Jugendsexualität, 1973 (with Gunter Schmidt).
- Die Zukunft der Monogamie, 1974 (with Gion Condrau, Jean-G. Lemaire).
- Therapie sexueller Störungen, 1975, 1980.
- Medizinische Experimente am Menschen, 1977, 1978.
- Sexualität und Medizin, 1979.
- Die sexuelle Frage, 1982.
- Vom Trieb und von der Liebe, 1984.
- Die Mystifikation des Sexuellen, 1984.
- Sexualtheorie und Sexualpolitik, 1984 (with Martin Dannecker).
- Sexualität konkret. Sammelband 2, 1984 (with Ingrid Klein and Hermann L. Gremliza).
- Operation AIDS, 1986.
- AIDS als Risiko, 1987.
- AIDS. Ergebnisse eines Kongresses, 1988 (with Steffen Fliegel).
- Kritik der disziplinierten Sexualität, 1989.
- Anti-Moralia, 1990.
- Geschlechtswechsel, 1992, 1993, 1995.
- Karl Heinrich Ulrichs. Der erste Schwule der Weltgeschichte, 2000.
- Freud und das Sexuelle. Neue psychoanalytische und sexualwissenschaftliche Perspektiven, 2005 (with Ilka Quindeau).
- Praktische Sexualmedizin: eine Einführung, 2005.
- Sexuelle Welten: Zwischenrufe eines Sexualforschers, 2005.
- Neosexualitäten: über den kulturellen Wandel von Liebe und Perversion, 2005.
- Sexuelle Störungen und ihre Behandlung, 1996, 1997, 2001, 2007.
- Geschichte der Sexualwissenschaft, 2008.
- Personenlexikon der Sexualforschung, 2009 (with Günter Grau).
- Auf der Suche nach der sexuellen Freiheit. Über Sexualforschung u. Politik. Frankfurt a. M., New York 2011. ISBN 978-3-593-39430-5
- mit Günter Amendt und Gunter Schmidt: Sex tells. Sexualforschung als Gesellschaftskritik. Hamburg, 2011. ISBN 978-3-930786-61-9
- Sexualitäten. Eine kritische Theorie in 99 Fragmenten. Frankfurt a. M., New York 2013 – ISBN 978-3-593-39975-1

=== Articles ===
- Sigusch, Volkmar (2001). "Lean sexuality: On cultural transformations of sexuality and gender in recent decades". Sexuality and Culture. 5 (2). Springer Science and Business Media LLC: 23–56. doi:10.1007/s12119-001-1017-0. ISSN 1095-5143. S2CID 7152909.
