= Sexology =

Scientific study of human sexuality

Sexology is the scientific study of human sexuality, including human sexual interests, behaviors, and functions. The term sexology does not generally refer to the non-scientific study of sexuality, such as social criticism.

Sexologists apply tools from several academic fields, such as anthropology, biology, medicine, psychology, epidemiology, sociology, and criminology. Topics of study include sexual development (puberty), sexual orientation, gender identity, sexual relationships, sexual activities, paraphilias, and atypical sexual interests. It also includes the study of sexuality across the lifespan, including child sexuality, puberty, adolescent sexuality, and sexuality among the elderly. The field of sexology also encompasses the study of sexuality among individuals with mental or physical disabilities. The sexological study of sexual dysfunctions and disorders, including erectile dysfunction and anorgasmia, are also mainstays.

== History ==
=== Early ===
Sex manuals have existed for centuries, such as Ovid's Ars Amatoria, the Kama Sutra of Vatsyayana, the Ananga Ranga, and The Perfumed Garden for the Soul's Recreation. De la prostitution dans la ville de Paris (Prostitution in the City of Paris), an early 1830s study on 3,558 registered prostitutes in Paris, written by Alexander Jean Baptiste Parent-Duchatelet (published in 1837, a year after he died), has been called the first work of modern sex research. In England, James Graham was an early sexologist who lectured on topics such as the process of sex and conception.

The scientific study of sexual behavior in human beings began in the 19th century with Heinrich Kaan, whose book Psychopathia Sexualis (1844) Michel Foucault describes as marking "the date of birth, or in any case the date of the emergence of sexuality and sexual aberrations in the psychiatric field." The term sexology was coined for the first time in the United States by Elizabeth Osgood Goodrich Willard in 1867. Roughly simultaneously a group of homophile activists, not yet identifying themselves as sexologists, were responding to shifts in Europe's national borders, a crisis that brought into conflict laws that were sexually liberal and laws that criminalized behaviors such as homosexual activity.

=== Victorian era to WWII ===
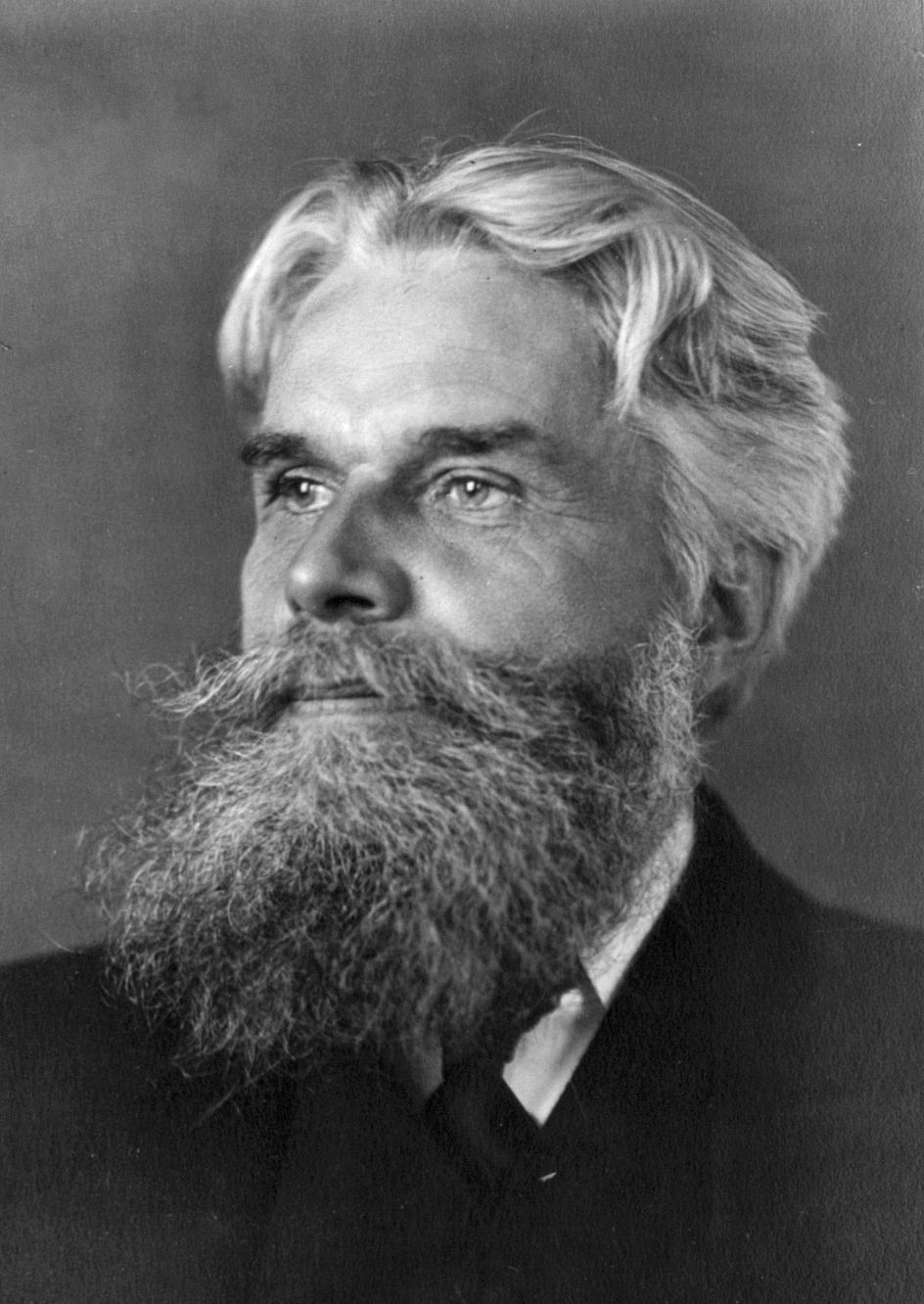
Havelock Ellis, a pioneering figure in the movement towards sexual emancipation in the late 19th century

Despite the prevailing social attitude of sexual repression in the Victorian era, the movement towards sexual emancipation began towards the end of the nineteenth century in England and Germany. In 1886, Richard Freiherr von Krafft-Ebing published Psychopathia Sexualis. That work is considered as having established sexology as a scientific discipline.

In England, the founding father of sexology was the doctor and sexologist Havelock Ellis who challenged the sexual taboos of his era regarding masturbation and homosexuality and revolutionized the conception of sex in his time. His seminal work was the 1897 Sexual Inversion, which describes the sexual relations of homosexual males, including men with boys. Ellis wrote the first objective study of homosexuality (the term was coined by Karl-Maria Kertbeny), as he did not characterize it as a disease, immoral, or a crime. The work assumes that same-sex love transcended age taboos as well as gender taboos. Seven of his twenty-one case studies are of inter-generational relationships. He also developed other important psychological concepts, such as autoerotism and narcissism, both of which were later developed further by Sigmund Freud.

Ellis pioneered transgender phenomena alongside the German Magnus Hirschfeld. He established it as a new category that was separate and distinct from homosexuality. Aware of Hirschfeld's studies of transvestism, but disagreeing with his terminology, in 1913 Ellis proposed the term sexo-aesthetic inversion to describe the phenomenon.

In 1908, the first scholarly journal of the field, Journal of Sexology (Zeitschrift für Sexualwissenschaft), began publication and was published monthly for one year. Those issues contained articles by Freud, Alfred Adler, and Wilhelm Stekel. In 1913, the first academic association was founded: the Society for Sexology.

Freud developed a theory of sexuality. These stages of development include: oral, anal, phallic, latency and genital. These stages run from infancy to puberty and onwards. based on his studies of his clients, between the late 19th and early 20th centuries. Wilhelm Reich and Otto Gross were disciples of Freud, but rejected his theories because of their emphasis on the role of sexuality in the revolutionary struggle for the emancipation of mankind.

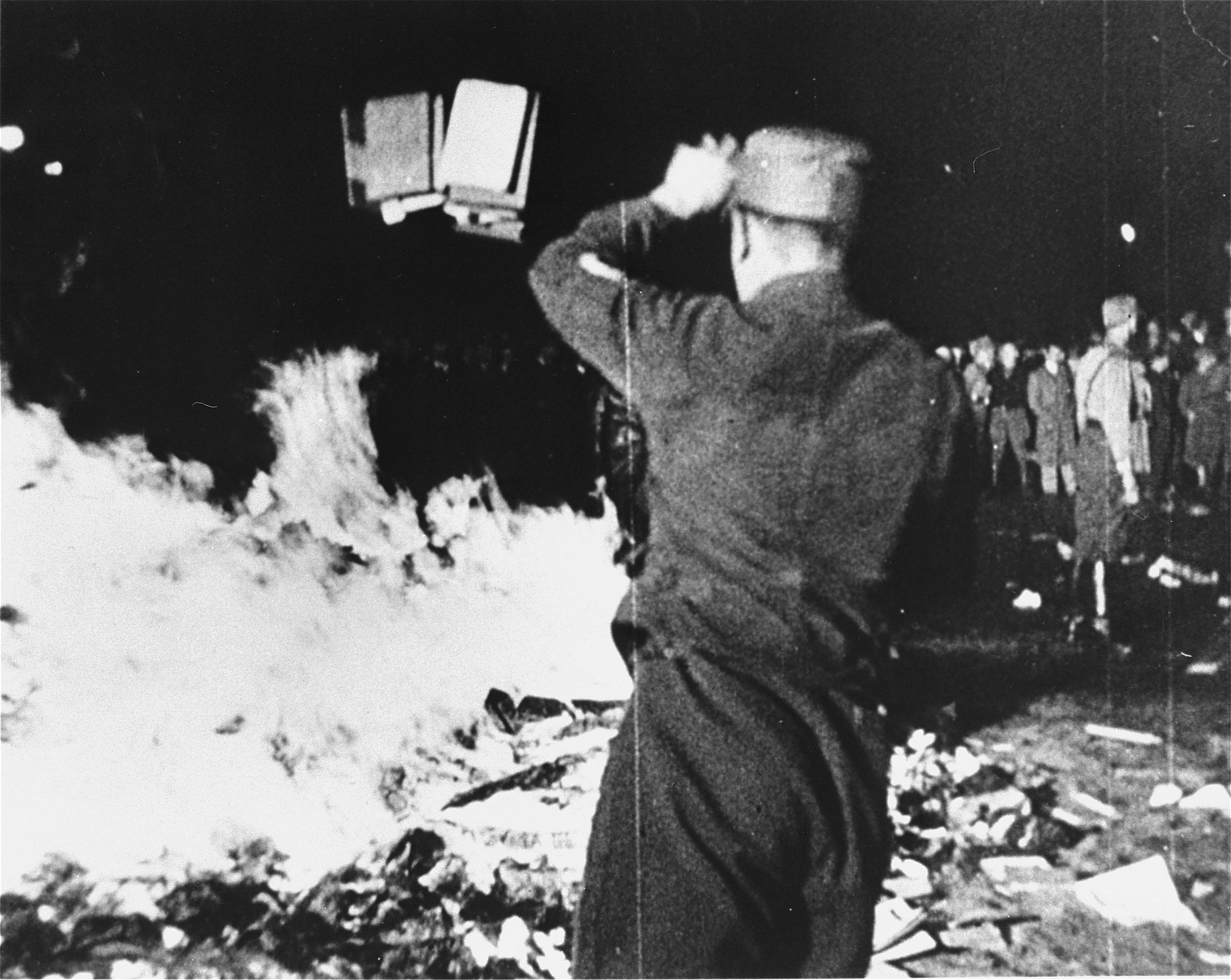
Hirschfeld's books were burned by the Nazis in Berlin for being "un-German".

Pre-Nazi Germany, under the sexually liberal Napoleonic Code, organized and resisted the anti-sexual, Victorian cultural influences. The momentum from those groups led them to coordinate sex research across traditional academic disciplines, bringing Germany to the leadership of sexology. Physician Magnus Hirschfeld was an outspoken advocate for sexual minorities, founding the Scientific Humanitarian Committee, the first advocacy for homosexual and transgender rights.

Hirschfeld also set up the first Institut für Sexualwissenschaft (Institute for Sexology) in Berlin in 1919. Its library housed over 20,000 volumes, 35,000 photographs, a large collection of art and other objects. People from around Europe visited the institute to gain a clearer understanding of their sexuality and to be treated for their sexual concerns and dysfunctions.

Hirschfeld developed a system which identified numerous actual or hypothetical types of sexual intermediary between heterosexual male and female to represent the potential diversity of human sexuality, and is credited with identifying a group of people that today are referred to as transsexual or transgender as separate from the categories of homosexuality, he referred to these people as transvestiten (transvestites). Germany's dominance in sexual behavior research ended with the Nazi regime. The Institute and its library were destroyed by the Nazis less than three months after they took power, May 8, 1933. The institute was shut down and Hirschfeld's books were burned.

Other sexologists in the early gay rights movement included Ernst Burchard and Benedict Friedlaender. Ernst Gräfenberg, after whom the G-spot is named, published the initial research developing the intrauterine device (IUD).

=== Post WWII ===
After World War II, sexology experienced a renaissance, both in the United States and Europe. Large scale studies of sexual behavior, sexual function, and sexual dysfunction gave rise to the development of sex therapy. Post-WWII sexology in the U.S. was influenced by the influx of European refugees escaping the Nazi regime and the popularity of the Kinsey studies. Until that time, American sexology consisted primarily of groups working to end prostitution and to educate youth about sexually transmitted infections. Alfred Kinsey founded the Institute for Sex Research at Indiana University at Bloomington in 1947. This is now called the Kinsey Institute for Research in Sex, Gender and Reproduction. He wrote in his 1948 book that more was scientifically known about the sexual behavior of farm animals than of humans.

Psychologist and sexologist John Money developed theories on sexual identity and gender identity in the 1950s. His work, notably on the David Reimer case has since been regarded as controversial, even while the case was key to the development of treatment protocols for intersex infants and children.

Kurt Freund developed the penile plethysmograph in Czechoslovakia in the 1950s. The device was designed to provide an objective measurement of sexual arousal in males and is currently used in the assessment of pedophilia and hebephilia. This tool has since been used with sex offenders.

In 1966 and 1970, Masters and Johnson released their works Human Sexual Response and Human Sexual Inadequacy, respectively. Those volumes sold well, and they were founders of what became known as the Masters & Johnson Institute in 1978.

Vern Bullough was a historian of sexology during this era, as well as being a researcher in the field.

The emergence of HIV/AIDS in the 1980s caused a dramatic shift in sexological research efforts towards understanding and controlling the spread of the disease.

== 21st century ==
Technological advances have permitted sexological questions to be addressed with studies using behavioral genetics, neuroimaging, and large-scale Internet-based surveys.

Sexology is a regulated profession in some jurisdictions. In Quebec, sexologists must be members of the Ordre professionnel des sexologues du Québec. They are one of the professions eligible to receive psychotherapy permits from the Ordre des psychologues du Québec.

== Notable contributors ==
This is a list of sexologists and notable contributors to the field of sexology, by year of birth:

- Karl Heinrich Ulrichs (1825–1895)
- Karl Friedrich Otto Westphal (1833–1890)
- Richard Freiherr von Krafft-Ebing (1840–1902)
- Albert Eulenburg (1840–1917)
- Auguste Henri Forel (1848–1931)
- Sigmund Freud (1856–1939)
- Wilhelm Fliess (1858–1928)
- Havelock Ellis (1858–1939)
- Eugen Steinach (1861–1944)
- Robert Latou Dickinson (1861–1950)
- Albert Moll (1862–1939)
- Edvard Westermarck (1862–1939)
- Clelia Duel Mosher (1863–1940)
- Eugene Wilhelm (aka Numa Praetorius) (1866–1951)
- Magnus Hirschfeld (1868–1935)
- Iwan Bloch (1872–1922)
- Theodoor Hendrik van de Velde (1873–1937)
- Gaston Vorberg (1875–1947)
- Max Marcuse (1877–1963)
- Otto Gross (1877–1920)
- Ernst Gräfenberg (1881–1957)
- Bronisław Malinowski (1884–1942)
- Harry Benjamin (1885–1986)
- Hans Blüher (1888–1955)
- Theodor Reik (1888–1969)
- Zhang Jingsheng (1888–1970)
- Alfred Kinsey (1894–1956)
- Wilhelm Reich (1897–1957)
- Mary Calderone (1904–1998)
- Wardell Pomeroy (1913–2001)
- Albert Ellis (1913–2007)
- Kurt Freund (1914–1996)
- Ernest Borneman (1915–1995)
- William Masters (1915–2001)
- Gershon Legman (1917–1999)
- Harold I. Lief (1917–2007)
- Paul H. Gebhard (1917–2015)
- Alex Comfort (1920–2000)
- Lykke Aresin (1921–2011)
- John Money (1921–2006)
- Robert Stoller (1924–1991)
- Ira Reiss (1925–2024)
- Virginia Johnson (1925–2013)
- Preben Hertoft (1928–2017)
- Oswalt Kolle (1928–2010)
- Vern Bullough (1928–2006)
- Ruth Westheimer (1928–2024)
- John Gagnon (1931–2016)
- Fritz Klein (1932–2006)
- Milton Diamond (1934–2024)
- Erwin J. Haeberle (1936–2021)
- Marco Aurelio Denegri (1938–2018)
- Gunter Schmidt (1938–present)
- Rolf Gindorf (1939–2016)
- Volkmar Sigusch (1940–2023)
- Beverly Whipple (1941–2026)
- Martin Dannecker (1942–present)
- Shere Hite (1943–2020)
- Ray Blanchard (1945–present)
- Pepper Schwartz (1945–present)
- Gilbert Herdt (1949–present)
- Pan Suiming (1950–present)
- Kenneth Zucker (1950–present)
- Ava Cadell (1956–present)
- Carol Queen (1957–present)
- James Cantor (1966–present)
- Michael C. Seto (1967–present)
- Marta Crawford (1969–present)
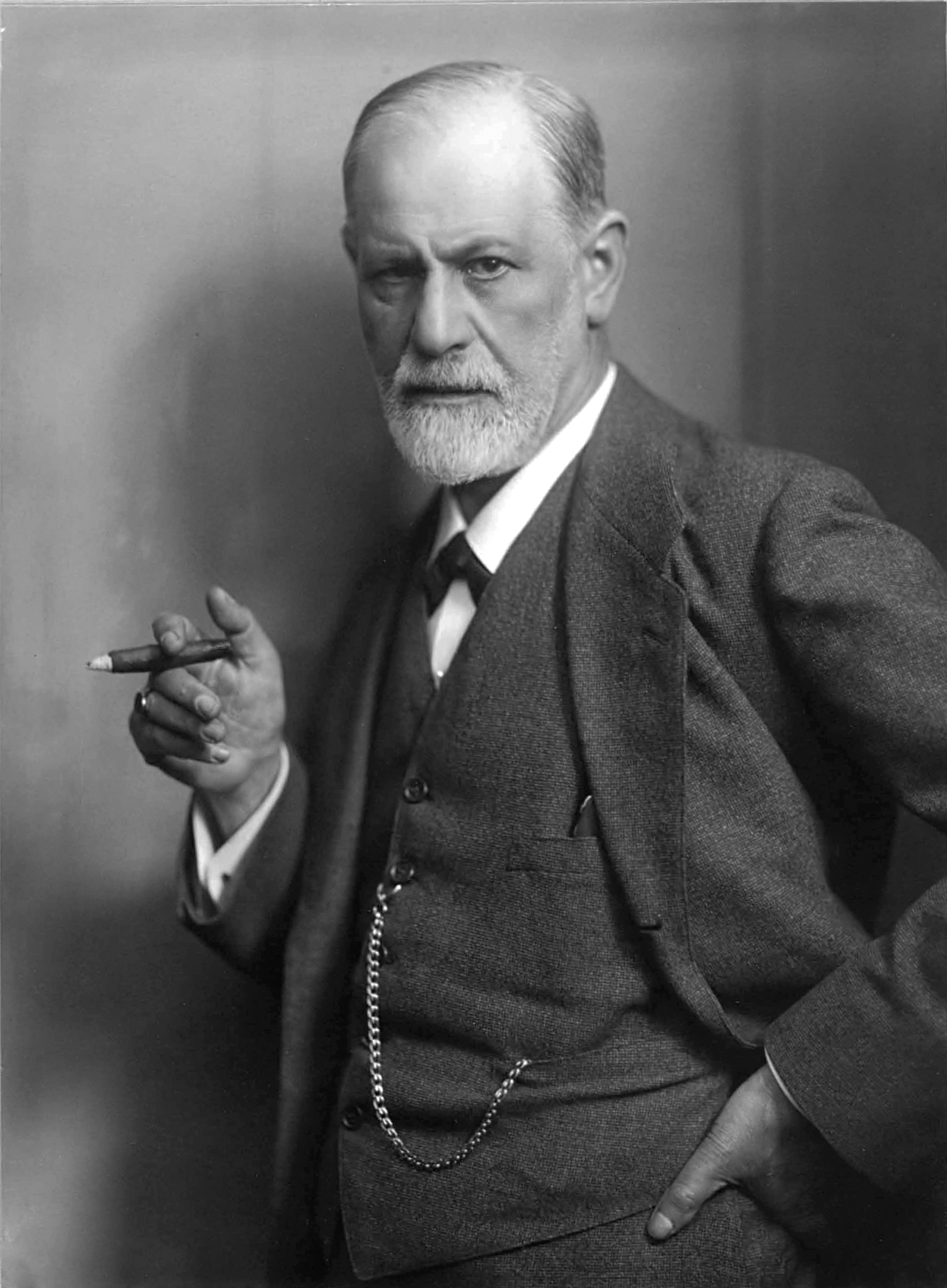
Sigmund Freud

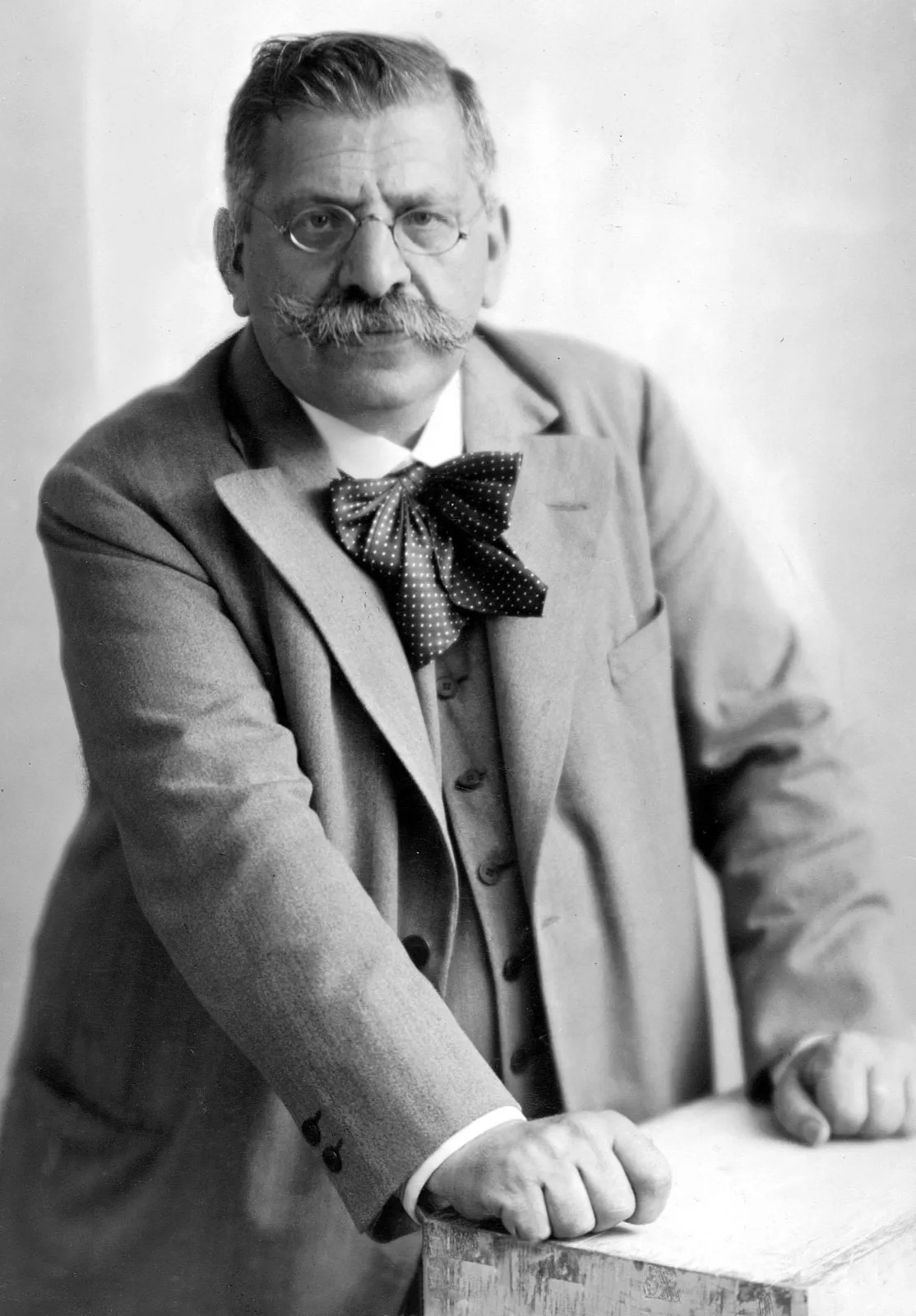
Magnus Hirschfeld

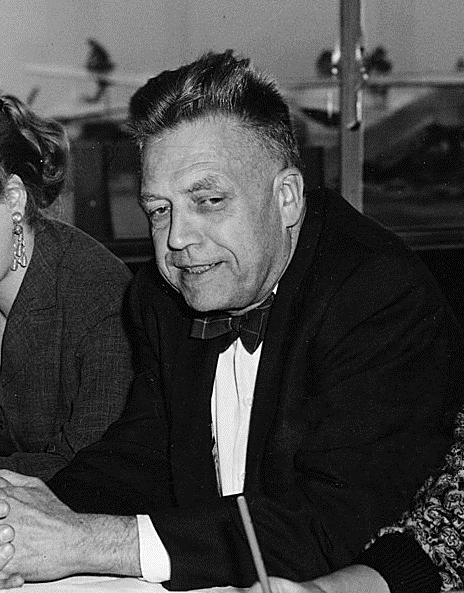
Alfred Kinsey

== See also ==
- Certified sex therapist
- Gender and sexuality studies
- List of academic journals in sexology
- List of sexology organizations
- Philosophy of sex
- Sex education
- Sexological testing
- Sexophobia
- Porn Studies (journal)
