= Helmut Kentler =

German psychologist (1928–2008)

- Born: 2 July 1928; Cologne, Germany
- Died: 9 July 2008 (aged 80); Hanover, Germany
- Occupations: Sexologist, psychologist, academic
- Employer: University of Hannover
- Known for: Kentler experiment

Helmut Kentler (2 July 1928 – 9 July 2008) was a German psychologist, sexologist and professor of social education at the University of Hannover. From the late 1960s until the early 1990s, with the authorization and financial support of the Berlin Senate, Kentler, an advocate of emancipatory sexual education and sexuality, placed several neglected youth as foster children in the homes of single pedophile fathers. Kentler believed pedophiles could make acceptable foster parents, and that any sexual contact would be relatively harmless if it were not forced. This project was later dubbed the "Kentler Experiment" or the "Kentler Project." Kentler later changed his mind on pedophiles having sexual contact with children, and described pedophilia as a "sexual disorder".

== Early life and education ==
Kentler was born to a German family. His father worked in the Nazi German government. Kentler's parents followed the childcare techniques of Moritz Schreber, who argued the authority of fathers and suppression of children's emotion would create a stronger race of men.

After graduating from high school, Kentler wanted to study theology to become a pastor. His father insisted he undertake technical vocational training. Kentler completed an apprenticeship as a locksmith at the Lokomotivfabrik Henschel in Kassel and subsequently studied electrical engineering at the RWTH Aachen. After the death of his father, he withdrew from his studies in Aachen. From 1953 to 1954, he trained as an interpreter in English and French. Afterwards, he studied psychology, medicine, education and philosophy in Switzerland and Freiburg, Germany. During his studies, he participated in a field trial with young workers, which he documented and reflected on later in his 1959 book, Youth Work in the Industrial World. In it, he still explicitly proclaimed his Christian faith (according to Rüdiger Lautmann in his 2008 obituary on Kentler for the Humanistische Union); in later publications, this was no longer the case. In 1960 he passed the main diploma examination for psychology.

== Career ==
After completing his studies he initially worked as a youth education officer at the Evangelische Akademie Arnoldshain. Afterwards, he worked from 1962 to 1965 as a research assistant and "first pedagogue" in the Studienzentrum Josefstal (protestant youth work) at Neuhaus am Schliersee. The theory of emancipatory youth work, which he played a decisive role in developing, made him known nationwide. The following year he was assistant to Klaus Mollenhauer at the PH Berlin. Afterwards, he became head of the Department for Social Pedagogy and Adult Education at the Pedagogical Centre Berlin and from 1967 to 1974 departmental director there. In 1975, he received his doctorate in Hanover with the dissertation Parents learn sexual education, which also appeared as a book and reached a total circulation of 30,000 copies by the 1990s. In 1976, he was appointed as a university lecturer for the training of vocational school teachers for special education at the University of Hanover, where he taught until his retirement in 1996.

Kentler was one of the advocates of "emancipatory" youth work and is considered a representative of sexual education of the 1960s and 1970s. In his work as a court expert and expert on child and adolescent sexuality, he achieved recognition in professional circles. From 1979 to 1982 he was president of the German Society for Social-Scientific Sexuality Research; later he was on the advisory board of the Humanist Union. He was also a member of the Deutsche Gesellschaft für Sexualforschung.

For Helmut Kentler, theory and practice were tightly knit throughout his life. His development of a theory of emancipatory youth work grew out of his work with adolescents and young adults during his studies and the five years he spent working in church educational institutions. He implemented group pedagogy and teamwork in theory and practice as a trusting and respectful cooperation of pedagogues with different professional competencies, and attempted to gain insight into psychosocial connections for learning and emancipation processes for young people and adults. This was a new concept for church educational work in the 1960s. In addition to his professional duties, he worked in various fields of pedagogical practice in an advisory and teaching capacity. From 1970 to 1974, he sat on the pedagogical advisory board of the first residential community for orphaned children at Maxdorfer Steig, sponsored by the Berlin Senate.

During the student riots in Berlin, Kentler was temporarily active as a "psychological consultant for police issues". The sexual liberation movement of Berlin students in communes and shared flats resulted in his advocacy for emancipatory sexual education in the home. This was reflected scientifically in his dissertation in 1975, rendering him an expert in sexual education for the course of his professional life.

=== Kentler experiment ===
In a model experiment in Berlin that began at the end of the 1960s, Kentler placed several neglected 13- to 15-year-old boys he considered "secondary mental defectives" with pedophiles he knew, claiming this would reintegrate them into society and allow them to grow into mature adults. This occurred with knowledge and approval of Berlin's Senate Youth Administration. Due to the criminal offense associated with it, he wrote about the experiment publicly first in 1980, when the statute of limitations had expired. Kentler claimed that the experiment would help the children to regain social stability through exposure to pedophiles. He was aware that the adults would most likely perform sexual acts on the minors.

At a factional hearing of the FDP in 1981, Kentler reported: "These people only endured these moronic boys because they were in love and infatuated with them." In an expert opinion in 1988 for the Senatsverwaltung für Familie, Frauen und Jugend he described the results of the trial as "a complete success". He maintained contact with the abuse victims during his teaching activities in Hanover, and in an expert opinion for the Berlin Family Court in the early 1990s recommended that one of the abused youths remain with his pedophile foster father, whom he described as a pedagogical natural talent.

From Hanover, Kentler still supervised a pedophile foster father of several boys in Berlin as late as 1988–1999, frequently meeting with the man and a boy and writing to Berlin youth authorities and judges.

By 1999 Kentler had apparently changed his mind on pedophiles having sexual contact with children, describing pedophilia in an interview as a "sexual disorder" and stating that in such a relation, the adult will always have the "monopoly on definition."

Kentler was homosexual, single and had three adoptive sons and several foster children. One former associate of Kentler later stated that two of the foster children had come to her for therapy as Kentler had sexually abused them.

== Positions ==
=== Sexuality and society ===
In Kentler's view, it was not enough for parents to avoid putting obstacles in the way of their children's sexual desires. Rather, parents should introduce their children to sexuality, because otherwise they "risk leaving them sexually underdeveloped, to become sexual cripples". Parents would bear a high degree of responsibility here: "Parents must be made aware that a good relationship of trust between children and parents cannot be maintained if children are denied the satisfaction of needs as urgent as sexual ones." Early experiences of coitus are useful because teenagers with such experience "demand an independent world of teenagers and more often reject the norms of adults".

One of Kentler's particular concerns was the reduction of sexual repression amongst girls: "Often the repressive education was so successful that they no longer feel any sexual pressure. A sexually open-minded boy then calls such a girl 'uptight', and 'unfashionable'."

Based on his view that children can have sexual needs even before puberty, he made a distinction between voluntary sexual interactions among peers and with adults from sexual abuse of children: "Sexually satisfied children who have a good relationship of trust with their parents, especially in sexual matters, are best protected against sexual seduction and sexual attacks." Kentler warned the parents against being concerned over rape or molestation of children by adults: "The wrong thing to do now would be for parents to lose their nerve, panic and run straight to the police. If the adult was considerate and tender, the child could even have enjoyed sexual contact with him". Kentler considered equal and non-discriminatory sexual relationships between adults and children to be acceptable: "If such relationships are not discriminated against by the environment, then the more the older one feels responsible for the younger one, the more positive consequences for personality development can be expected", he wrote in 1974 in his foreword to the book Zeig mal!

=== Activity as court expert ===
Kentler also acted as a forensic expert in abuse cases. In 1997, he declared about the almost 30 cases he had dealt with up to that point: "I am very proud that so far all cases I have dealt with have been terminated with the discontinuation of proceedings or even acquittals." Kentler did not attribute injustice to the sexual activity of adults with children but to the violence that may have occurred. This, however, he believed to be atypical, since "real paedophiles do not use violence but are highly sensitive to damage to children". In 1999, Kentler announced the publication of a book about "the approximately 35 lawsuits against innocent people whom I have accompanied as an expert witness," but then abandoned the manuscript (Parents Under Suspicion – Of Sexual Abuse) unpublished. In the same year he declared:

[...] I have [...] in the vast majority of cases had the experience that pederastic conditions can have a very positive effect on the personality development of a boy, especially if the pederast is a real mentor.

== Reception ==
After the magazine EMMA reported on his activities in 1993, he was shouted down by feminist activists at an event in Hanover and punched in the face by an audience member.

Jan Feddersen praised Kentler in an obituary in the Tageszeitung of 12 July 2008, as a "meritorious fighter for a permissive sexual morality". Some Protestant church authorities expressed a similar opinion. In an obituary, the Study Centre for Protestant Youth Work pointed out Kentler's controversial positions, but also acknowledged his work for "institutional structure and professional socialisation" and attempts to make homosexuality socially acceptable in the church. While the Working Group of Protestant Youth in Germany immediately removed the obituary following a motion of the synod, the Kentler Study Centre defended him without addressing his misconduct in exposing children to sexual exploitation detailed at length in the motion. Rather, Helmut Kentler "has had a lasting influence on the conceptual development and the student research project in Josefstal to this day".

The Humanist Union pays positive tribute to Kentler as a person and to his body of work. His obituary reads: "A lighthouse of our advisory board has been extinguished. Like no other, Helmut Kentler embodied the humanistic task of an enlightened sex education and was also a role model for public science. (...) Kentler impressed his readers and listeners alike with a rare combination of competence, authenticity and intimacy ... Since he immediately aroused sympathies, many have confided in him."

Ursula Enders, founder of the victim support association "Zartbitter", criticizes Kentler as a man holding pedophile-friendly positions. In an editorial of the Frankfurter Rundschau in March 2010, Stephan Hebel assessed a passage from Kentler's foreword to the 1974 book Zeig mal! as an "open call to paedophilia"; Alice Schwarzer wrote similarly in the magazine EMMA. The Protestant authors Andreas Späth and Menno Aden also sharply attack Kentler in their book Die missbrauchte Republik – Aufklärung über die Aufklärer. Due to an article by Ursula Enders in EMMA in 1997, Kentler was prevented from receiving the Magnus Hirschfeld Prize in 1997 "at the last minute".

In Die Zeit in October 2013 Adam Soboczynski critically examined Kentler. Soboczynski explained that Die Zeit had shown a lack of sensitivity in publishing the "pedophile-friendly scientist" in the late 1960s due to the connection between anti-fascism and sexual liberation, which Kentler had claimed referring to Wilhelm Reich. Georg Diez subsequently criticized this text in his column on Spiegel Online, asserting Soboczynski had neither taken Kentler seriously nor really analysed him.

In 2013, the political scientist Franz Walter from the Göttingen Institute for Democracy Research, who was investigating the former position of sections of the Greens and FDP on pedophilia, assigned Kentler a key role in German networks of pedophile activists.

== Later investigation ==
In 2015, after public pressure, the Berlin Senate Administration commissioned a study by Teresa Nentwig, a political scientist at the Institute for Democracy Research in Göttingen, on the pedosexual "experiment" Kentler conducted in Berlin in the late 1960s with the support of the Youth Welfare Office. In this context, the Berlin Senator for Education Sandra Scheeres called the "experiment" a "crime in state responsibility". Affected persons, who had contacted the senator responsible in 2017, expressed their disappointment about lack of support. In 2017/18, Nentwig was also commissioned in Lower Saxony to research the effects of Kentler's activities there. Kentler also dealt with young people with behavioural problems in Hanover, had contacts with the youth welfare office there, and was supposed to provide scientific support on their behalf for the first care of a lesbian couple, but this did not come about because the couple decided to withdraw for personal reasons. Whether Kentler himself was sexually assaulting young people, such as his foster and adopted sons or his tutoring students, remains an open question, although his colleague Gunter Schmidt has claimed Kentler disclosed having sexually abused one of his sons from age thirteen through adulthood until the son committed suicide in 1991.

In January 2018, Leibniz Universität Hannover announced that it had initiated further investigations into Kentler. "I am downright shocked that at that time the executive and the judiciary let themselves be swallowed up by it," said President Volker Epping at a New Year's reception. "I am also completely flabbergasted that the professional community did not comment, did not cry out, about this activity of Kentler!" Only nine years after Kentler's death, upon the completion of the project "The Role of the Sexologist in the Discourse on Pedosexuality – for example, Helmut Kentler", funded by the Lower Saxony Ministry of Science and Culture, did the university realise the extent of the case. The aim of further investigation will be to examine the circumstances of Kentler's doctorate, appointment, and work until his retirement. This also includes the behaviour of the university, faculty and department toward Kentler. To ensure the proper processing of the case, contracts are awarded to external, independent persons.

On 15 June 2020, a report prepared by academics entitled "Helmut Kentler's Work in Berlin Child and Youth Services" was presented in Berlin. In this context, the Berlin Senator for Education Sandra Scheeres promised those affected by abuse financial compensation from the State of Berlin. The same academics wrote a further report alleging the existence of "a nationwide network of respected progressive educators, youth welfare office employees, and social workers" that justified and facilitated abuse; however, law professor Reinhard Wiesner criticised the report as lacking evidence for its claims regarding the knowledge of "bystanders" and thus potentially libellous.

== Selected works ==
- Jugendarbeit in der Industriewelt. Bericht von einem Experiment. 2. Auflage. Juventa Verlag, München 1962.
- Was ist Jugendarbeit?, zus. mit C. W. Mueller, K. Mollenhauer und H. Giesecke, Juventa, München 1964.
- Für eine Revision der Sexualpädagogik. Juventa-Verl., München 1967.
- Jugendarbeit mit emanzipierter Jugend. In: Deutsche Jugend, 1969, Heft 5.
- Eltern lernen Sexualerziehung. Rowohlt, Reinbek bei Hamburg 1995 (1. Auflage 1975).
- Leihväter. Kinder brauchen Väter. Rowohlt, Reinbek bei Hamburg 1989.
- Sexualwesen Mensch. Piper, München 1988.
- Die Menschlichkeit der Sexualität. Kaiser, München 1983.
- Taschenlexikon Sexualität. Schwann, Düsseldorf 1982.
- Sexualerziehung. Rowohlt, Reinbek bei Hamburg 1981 (1. Auflage 1970).
- Urlaub, einmal anders. Düsseldorf (Hrsg. DGB-BuVo, Abt.Jug.) 1975.
- Texte zur Sozio-Sexualität. Leske, Opladen 1973.
- Zeig mal! (Vorwort von H. Kentler); Autorin Helga Fleischhauer-Hardt mit Fotografien von Will McBride; Jugenddienst-Verlag, Wuppertal 1974.
- Täterinnen und Täter beim sexuellen Missbrauch von Jungen. In: Katharina Rutschky, Reinhardt Wolff (Hrsg.): Handbuch sexueller Mißbrauch. Klein, Hamburg 1999.

== Literature ==
- Andreas Späth, Menno Aden (Hrsg.): Die missbrauchte Republik – Aufklärung über die Aufklärer. (mit Beiträgen u. a. von Christa Meves, Harald Seubert und Albert Wunsch), Verlag Inspiration Un Limited, London und Hamburg 2010, ISBN 978-3-9812110-2-3, S. 127–148: Die Pädophilenbewegung (Helmut Kentler).
- Teresa Nentwig u. a., Institut für Demokratieforschung Georg-August-Universität Göttingen: Die Unterstützung pädosexueller bzw. päderastischer Interessen durch die Berliner Senatsverwaltung. Am Beispiel eines "Experiments" von Helmut Kentler und der "Adressenliste zur schwulen, lesbischen & pädophilen Emanzipation". Studie im Auftrag der Berliner Senatsverwaltung für Bildung, Jugend und Wissenschaft, 2016. (PDF)
- Teresa Nentwig: Im Fahrwasser der Emanzipation? Die Wege und Irrwege des Helmut Kentler, 2. Auflage, 2026, ISBN 978-3-525-30270-5.
