= Schreber =

Schreber is a German surname. Notable people with the surname include:

- Daniel Gottfried Schreber (1708–1777), German jurist and scholar
- Johann Christian Daniel von Schreber (1739–1810), German naturalist
- Moritz Schreber (1808–1861), German physician and inventor
  - Daniel Paul Schreber (1842–1911), German judge and son of Moritz
