= Christa Meves =

German psychotherapist (born 1925)

- Born: Christa Mittelstaedt; 4 March 1925 (age 101); Neumünster, Germany
- Education: University of Hamburg; University of Wrocław; University of Kiel
- Occupations: Psychotherapist; writer
- Years active: 1962–present
- Spouse: Harald Meves (m. 1945; died 2003)
- Awards: Order of St. Gregory the Great; Lower Saxony Order of Merit; Order of Merit of the Federal Republic of Germany

Christa Meves (née Mittelstaedt; born 4 March 1925) is a German psychotherapist and writer.

== Early life and education ==
Meves was born in 1925 in Neumünster. After studying geography and philosophy at the Universities of Breslau and Kiel, she passed her state examination in Hamburg, where she also studied psychology. In 1962 she completed her additional training as a child and adolescent psychotherapist at the Psychotherapeutic Institute in Göttingen. In 1992 she received state recognition. She is a member of the Lower Saxony Chamber of Psychotherapists.

== Career ==
She works in Uelzen where she has authored more than 100 books, which have been translated into up 13 languages. From 1978 to 2006 she was co-editor of the weekly newspaper Rheinischer Merkur. Meves is also the author of the right-wing Catholic paper Die Tagespost.

Christa developed her own concept on the basis of the neo-analytical drive theory and the instinct theory of Konrad Lorenz and Niko Tinbergen, developmental psychology and the findings of her child psychotherapeutic practical experience. This was later supported by results from brain and hormone research, which she then laid down in the book Secret Brain. Meves developed a theory of personality types, which she differentiated into representational, orderly, hermit and devotional types.

On the question of psychotherapeutic treatment in prison, Meves warned against carelessly overestimating the "reversibility of established criminal behavior disorders," thus a criminal accusation could not be made.

In her book Manipulated Excessiveness, Alex Comfort's Eros Enlightened (1964) and Helmut Kentler's Sex Education (1970) were subjected to harsh criticism. With Kentler's book, one "very clearly" gets the impression "that real demagogy is being practiced here. Here political incitement is to be encouraged and at the same time anarchy is to be promoted. "Mr. Kentler's instructions" on sex education are comparable to diabolical "strategies for the corruption of man." In her essay Der verkopfte Mensch, she blamed the philosophy of the Enlightenment and especially Kant for an overestimation of thinking and a devaluation of feelings. Religion assigns them here one-sidedly to the realm of feeling.

== Political and religious commitment ==
In 1981, Herder-Verlag founded the Christa Meves Circle of Friends, which in 1996 was expanded to become the Responsibility for the Family Association. From this, the ECCM, a continuing education school for parents, emerged under the direction of Christa Meves. Affiliated to the ECCM are the Christa Meves Fathers' College and the Christa Meves Parents' College, which offer their courses as events organised by the Engelwerk and its Order of the Cross.

In 1978, Meves co-wrote some programmatic points for Herbert Gruhl and his newly founded environmental party Grüne Aktion Zukunft. Meves later became active as a member of the small party AUF – Party for Labour, Environment and Family. She was the top candidate of the AUF party for the 2014 European elections. She also campaigned for the Familiennetzwerk, which represents conservative Christian positions.

Meves once worked for the Swiss national conservative newspaper Schweizerzeit.

She openly professes Catholicism and criticises the Evangelical Lutheran churches.

== Criticism ==
In 1976, Klaus Reblin, senior pastor at St. Katharinen in Hamburg and general secretary of the German Protestant Church Assembly, published a critical article about Meves in the weekly newspaper Die Zeit. Reblin asked: "Who is this evangelical woman writing for? Who reads the hundreds of thousands of books published under her name by the Catholic Herder Verlag? From what I've read of Meves, they can only be people full of resentment towards modernity. People who need confirmation of their prejudices against everything new – in black and white."

In 1978, Christian Schultz-Gerstein published a critical article about Meves in Der Spiegel. The educationalist Micha Brumlik claims that Meves is "taken just as little seriously by scientific educational advisors as by academic psychology." In one of her books from the year 2000, she transcends "the limits of committed, conservative counseling in the direction of inflammatory pamphlets about world views."

One of the sentences most quoted by her critics comes from her Marriage Alphabet (1973): "From her biological task, woman has a natural need for submission, and man for conquest and domination." Critics throw it She also suggested that in a 1977 interview with the then right-wing extremist magazine Mut, she confessed that "thanks to services rendered to the Führer, the people and the fatherland" she had "learned more practical psychology and pedagogy in the last years of the war than later at the university". Meves was also accused of publishing in right-wing media. The political scientist Wolfgang Gessenharter pointed out in 1989 that she was not only a "welcome guest" at the Weikersheim study center, but also a woman "who is not afraid to appear in press products by the right-wing extremist publisher Gerhard Frey with an interview and meanwhile also to write in Schönhuber's magazine Republikaner". In 1997, the federal government pointed out that it was a member of the board of trustees of the "Ludwig Frank Foundation for a Liberal Europe," which maintained contacts with right-wing extremist groups.

It has been also criticised that Meves portrays sex education as completely superfluous when she writes: "The goal of sex education can therefore not possibly be to acquire knowledge and practices about sexual processes. ... Sexuality, like that of animals, is an instinctual process that requires absolutely no explanation for its functioning." The Protestant pastor Helmut Schütz rejects Meves' criticism of the educational brochure Let's Talk About Sex published by the State Center for Health Promotion in Rhineland-Palatinate. Meves is "ideologically blinded".

The writer Richard Wagner counts Meves among the "fundamentalist ladies" who expected the geistig-moralische Wende in 1982, but are today "remarkably powerless". Meves' interpretation of Harry Potter as a "sign of our godless time" did not go unchallenged even by Catholic theologians.

Catholic writer Luise Rinser was outraged by an account of a homosexual gathering in which Meves wrote: "People want clean, upright young men again." Rinser commented, "So homosexuals aren't clean, upright people? So they are unclean and crooked and cowardly? So they don't correspond to the image of the clean German that Hitler wanted him to have? How small is the step to Hitler's demand for SS ideals?" Hans-Georg Stümke and Rudi Finkler described Meves in their "standard work" Rosa Winkel, rosa Liste (1981) as "Germany's leading homophobe", because she has been leading "an ideological crusade against homosexuals for years".

== Personal life ==
Since 1946 she was married to the ophthalmologist Harald Meves until his death in 2003. From 1973 she was an appointed member of the Synod of the Protestant Church in Germany, from which she left in 1984 at her own request. In 1987 she converted from the Lutheranism to the Roman Catholic Church.

== Awards ==
- 1974 Wilhelm Bölsche Medal
- 1976 Prix Amade (of the Association Monégasque pour le Développement de l'Enfance )
- 1977 Gold medal of Verlag Herder
- 1978 Lower Saxony Order of Merit
- 1979 Konrad Adenauer Prize
- 1982 Sunshine medal of the Aktion Mensch
- 1984 Medal of Merit
- 1985 Order of Merit of the Federal Republic of Germany
- 1995 Prize of the Foundation for Western Reflection
- 1996 Prize for Scientific Journalism
- 2000 Golden Rose of Citizens Ask Journalists
- 2000 Medal of honour of the Diocese of Hildesheim
- 2001 German Schoolbook Prize
- 2005 Great Cross of Merit of the Lower Saxony Order of Merit
- 2005 Order of St. Gregory the Great (2nd Class)
- 2007 Foundation award of the right to life organisation Yes to Life Foundation (Stiftung Ja zum Leben)

== Writings (selection) ==
- Schulnöte und Kinder, Mut zum Erziehen. 1970.
- Erziehen lernen in tiefenpsychologischer Sicht. 1971.
- Verhaltensstörungen bei Kindern. 1971.
- Manipulierte Maßlosigkeit. 1971.
- Wunschtraum und Wirklichkeit. 1972.
- Die Bibel antwortet uns in Bildern. 1973.
- Ehe-Alphabet. 1973.
- Ermutigung zum Leben. 1974.
- Kinderschicksal in unserer Hand. 1974.
- Ich will leben. Briefe an Martina. Probleme des Jugendalters. Weißes Kreuz, Kassel 1974, ISBN 3-87893-005-4 (viele Auflagen).
- Freiheit will gelernt sein. 1975.
- Ninive darf nicht untergehen. 1975.
- Unser Leben muß anders werden. 1976.
- Lange Schatten – helles Licht. 1976.
- Werden wir ein Volk von Neurotikern? 1977.
- Seelische Gesundheit und biblisches Heil. 1978.
- ANIMA. 1979.
- Der Weg zum sinnerfüllten Leben. Orientierung und Hilfen. Herder, Freiburg im Breisgau 1980, ISBN 3-451-07931-3.
- Kleines ABC für Seelenhelfer. Grundregeln für die Begegnung mit Ratsuchenden und Patienten. Herder, Freiburg im Breisgau 1980, ISBN 3-451-07810-4.
- Unsere Kinder wachsen heran. 1981.
- Ich will mich ändern. 1981.
- Problemkinder brauchen Hilfe. 1982.
- Kraft aus der du leben kannst. 1983.
- Wohin gegen wir. 1984.
- Aus Vorgeschichten lernen. 1985.
- Wahrheit befreit. Argumente für den katholischen Glauben gegen die Anwürfe der Moderne aus psychologischer Sicht. 3. Auflage, Christiana, Stein am Rhein 1995, ISBN 3-7171-0971-5.
- Erziehen lernen. Was Eltern und Erzieher wissen sollten. Resch 1996, ISBN 3-9300-3951-6.
- Manipulierte Maßlosigkeit: psychische Gefahren im technisierten Leben; die Schwierigkeit, im Wohlstand glücklich zu sein; „Befreiung zum Sex“ – 30 Jahre danach; Gleichheitsideologie am Ende. 42. Auflage (405.–407. Tsd.), Christiana, Stein am Rhein 2000, ISBN 3-7171-1031-4 (Erstauflage: Herder, Freiburg im Breisgau 1971).
- Verführt, manipuliert, pervertiert: die Gesellschaft in der Falle modischer Irrlehren; Ursachen – Folgen – Auswege. Resch, Gräfelfing 2003, ISBN 978-3-935197-29-8.
