= Menno Aden =

Menno Aden may refer to:

- Menno Aden (politician) (born 1942), German lawyer, politician and translator
- Menno Aden (artist) (born 1972), German conceptual artist
