= Robin van Helsum =

Subject of a media frenzy

- Born: Robin van Helsum; 22 April 1992 (age 34); Hengelo, Netherlands
- Other names: Ray "Forest Boy"
- Children: 1
- Parent(s): Doreen van Helsum; Johan van Helsum (died 2012)
- Relatives: Damien van Helsum (son)

Robin van Helsum (born 22 April 1992) is a Dutch citizen who went missing on 2 September 2011 and appeared in the Berlin Rotes Rathaus three days later, claiming his mother had died in an automobile crash when he was 12 and that he had lived with his father for five years in the forests of Germany, where he buried his father after the latter died in August 2011. Dubbed "Forest Boy" by the media, Van Helsum later admitted that the disappearance was a hoax and was sentenced to 160 hours of community service. Van Helsum was believed to have vanished before he was discovered working in Berlin.

== Early life ==
Van Helsum was born on 22 April 1992 to Doreen and Johan van Helsum. Van Helsum's parents divorced shortly after he was born, and his mother emigrated to Portugal taking him and his older brother. As a child, he was rebellious towards his father and was known to be shy and rarely socialised. He is reportedly a fan of American cartoons South Park and Family Guy. Van Helsum's father Johan fought and won a custody case against his ex-wife and moved his sons back to the Netherlands upon their return to his legal guardianship. His father was known by his coworkers to be a dedicated father and brought up the children on a strict routine. Van Helsum had become traumatised as his mother attempted to contact her son by sending him gifts with van Helsum showing no interest.

He attended the ROC van Twente College to study Media and Communications. He was known to miss classes and did not gain his final certificate. Van Helsum moved to a group home under supervised accommodation at the age of 16, after he became estranged from his father, but was forced to leave at the age of 18 when officials discovered that he had impregnated a fellow resident of the facility. Upon hearing the news of the pregnancy, van Helsum disagreed with the pregnant woman over plans for the child as van Helsum did not want the child whereas she expressed interest for the child to be born. His son, Damien, was born in 2010. At the same time, van Helsum was working as an intern at Voicedata, a local telecommunications company which he left in February 2011. After leaving his job, van Helsum went into a Youth Hostel. During his time there, he spent most of his time using a computer and often argued with the hostel owners over payment of bills.

One week before his trek into Germany, van Helsum posted a message on the internet stating the need for housing for a long period of time to share with a roommate.

== Disappearance ==
Van Helsum reportedly made a five-day trek into Germany from his residence in Hengelo, Netherlands with a friend named Lex. The pair hiked with the help of a map and compass, and both stayed in tents overnight. He showed up at Berlin City Hall on 5 September 2011. The distance of about 500 km could not have been hiked in five days, implying that Van Helsum either hiked even longer or used other means of transportation. At the city hall, he spoke to the office workers saying; "I'm all alone in the world, I don't know who I am. Please help me.” He gave his first name as "Ray" and that his date of birth was 20 June 1994. had claimed that his father had died in August 2011 and that he had buried him "in a hole in the forest underneath some stones" and that his mother had died in a car crash when he was 12 and that van Helsum received scars on his face. (Unknown to van Helsum, his real father died in February 2012, not knowing what had happened to his son.) He was wearing a golden-coloured necklace around his neck with the pendant "D", the first letter in his mother's name. He had appeared without a passport and any form of identification. "Ray" spoke English with a slight accent suggesting to the German Authorities that one or both of his parents were American or British. Police in Berlin believed that he may have been from the Czech Republic having given the indication that he lived in the undergrowth of the Ore Mountains.

=== In care ===
Believed to be a minor and an orphan, van Helsum was provided shelter in social care housing in western Berlin by the Berlin Jugendamt (Youth Office). During his time in care, he was around other teenagers but had spoken little, having little knowledge of the German language. Van Helsum shared a room with another boy, showing the ability to eat with a knife and fork and went bowling with fellow residents. He was later moved to a long-term Hostel. Van Helsum had adapted to life in Berlin quickly. He was going to school and became adapted with technology, using a laptop and mobile phone, he had also learnt more German by taking lessons. and received pocket money. English language experts were employed attempting to determine where his origins were without any success.

=== Identification ===
Bild newspaper published a blurred photograph head and shoulders portrait of van Helsum. The photograph was blurred as the authorities suspected him of being a minor. In November 2011, van Helsum's DNA was taken to a local police data bank after he initially refused to give a sample. Fingerprints and photographs, along with DNA samples, circulated through Interpol and other major police forces and showed that van Helsum did not have a criminal record. Police attempted to search for a grave with no success and van Helsum was unable to locate the forest he was living in. A couple from Switzerland had contacted police to come forward believing that van Helsum was their grandson and had DNA samples taken.

With the attempts at identification of "Forest boy Ray" having failed, the Berlin police released a photograph in early June 2012, requesting identification. Van Helsum was then identified by a former girlfriend, whereupon he admitted having made up his story.

According to friends from his hometown of Hengelo, he was inspired by the films of the Zeitgeist Movement.

== Post-disappearance ==
Van Helsum was evicted from the Jugendamt shelter on 18 June 2012. As he is not a minor, he cannot be forced to return to the Netherlands. A spokesperson of the Berlin Jugendamt stated they were going to file a complaint against van Helsum for falsely acquiring youth assistance. He could face criminal charges and as much as a euro 30,000 (US$40,000) fine. Social services had complained about not receiving an apology or any sign of gratitude when van Helsum was in care.

Van Helsum was believed to have vanished, and the German Authorities believed he spent the summer moving from village to village with unconfirmed sightings in Berlin. His ex-girlfriend made an emotional appeal on Dutch television hoping that contact would be made between the pair.

A court case against van Helsum was held in Berlin on 26 September 2013. The court decided to drop the complaint of fraud if van Helsum will agree to 150 hours of community service. The Berlin Jugendamt could still demand payment back of costs incurred in a civil case.

== See also ==
- Kaspar Hauser
