= Fabian Kastner =

Swedish writer and literary critic (born 1977)

Fabian Kastner (born 1977) is a Swedish writer and literary critic.

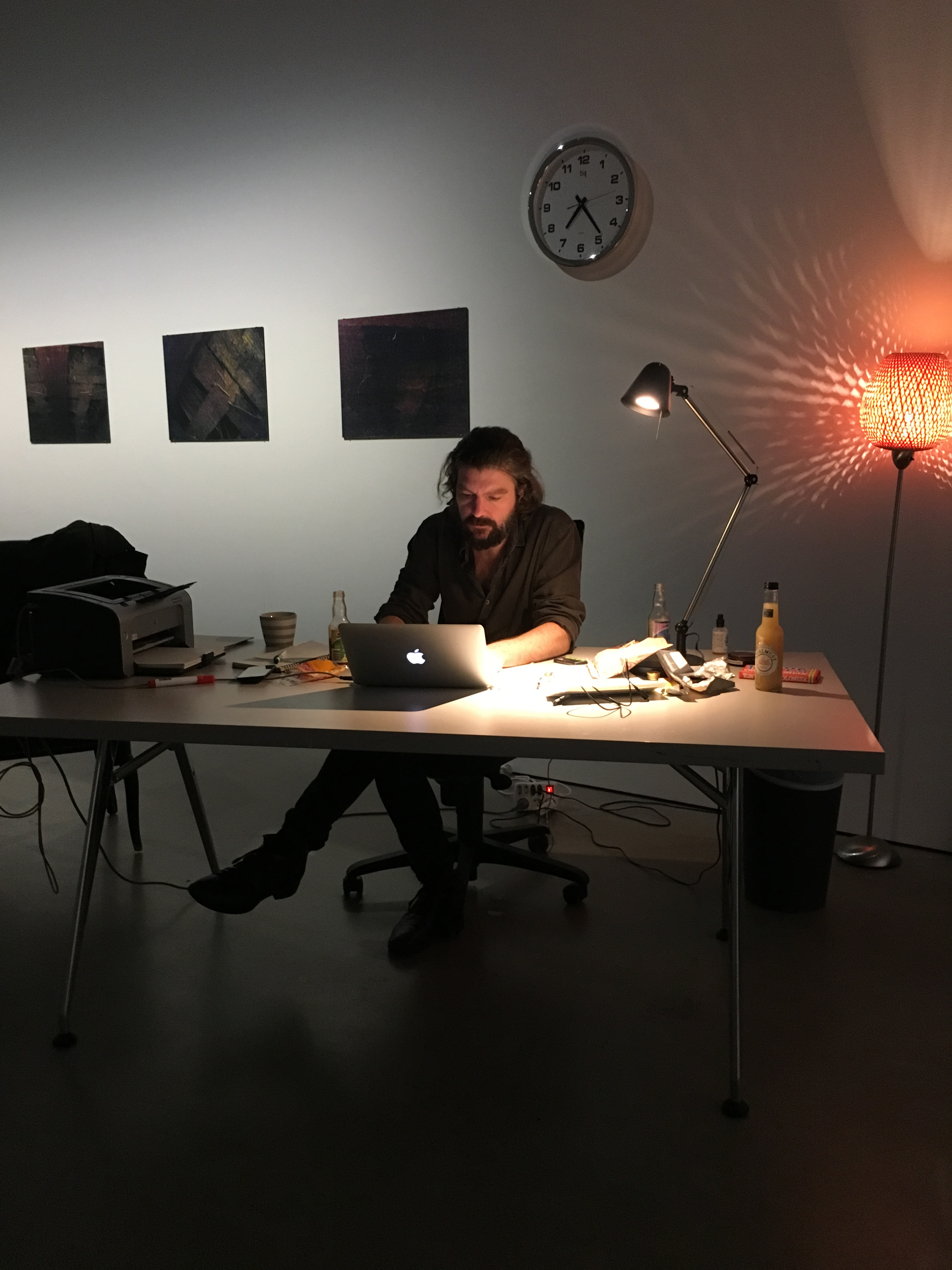
Fabian Kastner writing his 24-Hour Book at Bonniers Konsthall, Stockholm

Kastner caused a commotion in 2006 with his debut novel Oneirine, which turned out to be a literary experiment too far for the majority of critics: the book consisted exclusively of unattributed, pasted-together quotes from one thousand works of world literature. By doing so, Kastner wanted to discuss the issue of whether originality is possible in literature. The book was later turned into a library artwork at Bonniers Konsthall, a venue for Swedish and international contemporary art in the centre of Stockholm.

In Lekmannen ("The Layman", 2013), Kastner took as his starting point a theological essay on madness, Denkwürdigkeiten eines Nervenkranken (Memoirs of My Nervous Illness) by Daniel Paul Schreber, from 1903, creating from it a hallucinatory literary fantasy. Schreber was a German lawyer who spent long periods of his life in various mental hospitals, and Kastner allows the reader to enter into his paranoid universe, a claustrophobic space in which concepts such as madness and sanity are twisted, turn after turn.

In 2017, Kastner returned to the gallery space of Bonniers Konsthall to write a book from start to finish in twenty-four hours. The resulting novella, Archive of the Average Swede, was published in English as the fourth title of Cabinet Books’ experimental “24-Hour Book” series. The book considers a project initiated by Sweden’s National Archive in the early 1980s designed to fully record the life of a typical citizen. The selected citizen, however, turned out to be a very different figure than what the archive had hoped for.

Kastner is a regular contributor to the Swedish daily newspaper Svenska Dagbladet. He currently lives in Berlin, Germany.

== Bibliography ==
- Medelsvenskens arkiv (Archive of the Average Swede), Faethon, 2017 ISBN 978-91-984107-5-4
- Lekmannen ("The Layman"), Albert Bonniers Förlag, 2013 ISBN 978-91-0-013436-5
- Anakronismer (Anachronisms) (ed. Sara Arrhenius, Magnus Bergh), Albert Bonniers Förlag, 2007 ISBN 978-91-0-011606-4
- Oneirine ("Oneirine"), Albert Bonniers Förlag, 2006 ISBN 91-0-010833-2

== Translations in English ==
- Archive of the Average Swede, Cabinet Books, 2017 ISBN 978-19-3-269881-7
- Anachronisms (ed. Sara Arrhenius, Magnus Bergh), Albert Bonniers Förlag, 2007 ISBN 978-91-0-011606-4

== Honours and awards ==
- 2013 Awarded by the Swedish Academy
- 2013 Swedish Writers' Union Working Scholarship
- 2007 Albert Bonnier's Fellowship for Younger and Newer writers
- 2007 Swedish Writers' Union Working Scholarship
- 2006 Borås Tidning's Literary Debut Price, shortlisted for Oneirine
