= Coming of Age (book) =

1999 photography book by Will McBride

- Author: Will McBride
- Language: English
- Genre: Photography
- Publisher: Aperture Foundation
- Publication date: 1999
- ISBN: 0-89381-853-4

Coming of Age is a 1999 photographic art book by photographer Will McBride.

It contains a picture of a naked teenage male taken in the commune's kitchen in Oberpfaffenhofen, 1973.

The book primarily contains pictures of males in their teens. Some of the pictures are nude pictures.
