= Moritz Schreber =

German physician (1808–1861)

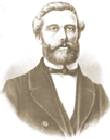
- Daniel Gottlob Moritz Schreber
- Born: 15 October 1808; Leipzig
- Died: 10 November 1861 (aged 53); Leipzig
- Occupations: physician, pedagogist, university teacher at University of Leipzig
- Employer: University of Leipzig
- Title: Medical Doctor
- Children: 5, including Daniel Paul

Daniel Gottlob Moritz Schreber (15 October 1808 – 10 November 1861) was a German medical doctor and university lecturer at the University of Leipzig. In 1844, he became director of the Leipzig Heilanstalt (sanatorium). His publications predominantly dealt with the subject of children's health and the social consequences of urbanization at the dawn of the Industrial Revolution.

- Die Eigenthümlichkeiten des kindlichen Organismus im gesunden und kranken Zustande (1839), literally: "Peculiarities of the child's organism in health and illness"
- Der Hausfreund als Erzieher und Führer zu Familienglück und Menschenveredelung (1861), "The friend of the family as an educator and leader to family happiness and human refinement"
- Die ärztliche Zimmergymnastik (1855), "Medical indoor gymnastics", his best selling piece of work

== Remedial exercises ==
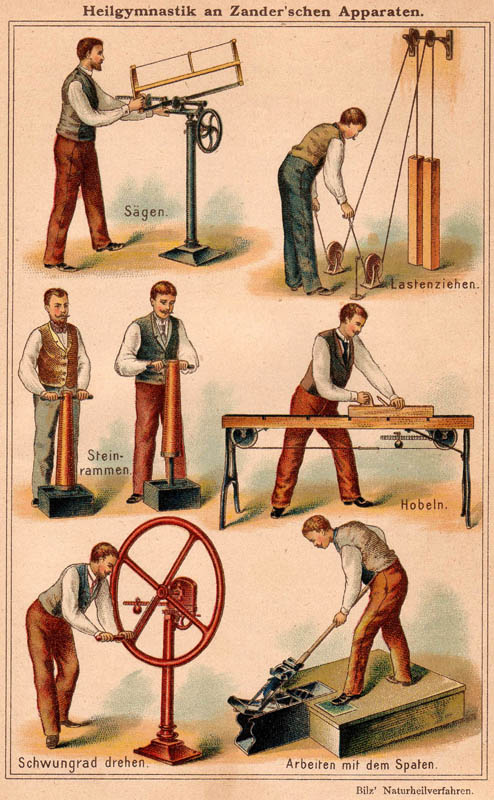
Contemporary depiction of remedial exercises

Schreber advocated both his "systematic remedial exercises" and countryside exercise for urban youth. During his time, the term Volksgesundheit (public health) was coined. Back then, it comprised the idea of a "healthy relief of excessive energy", as Schreber rigidly opposed masturbation and even experimented with mechanical devices to prevent it in adolescents (see below).

Due to the limited success of these methods, he advocated for playgrounds out of town, as urban housing had too little space for children to move about.

== Allotment gardens ==
Schreber was the founder of the eponymous "Schreber movement", although that term was used only after his death. In 1864, Leipzig school principal Ernst Innozenz Hauschild established the first Schrebergarten, the German term for what are known in English as allotments or community gardens, by leasing land for the physical exercise of children.

== Poisonous pedagogy ==
One of his sons, Daniel Paul Schreber, wrote an autobiographical account of what is now assumed to have been paranoid psychosis (a term not coined back then), Memoirs of My Nervous Illness (original German title Denkwürdigkeiten eines Nervenkranken). The notes were later analysed by Sigmund Freud on the theoretical basis of psychoanalysis.

Two other children of Schreber also suffered from mental disease. One of them, his oldest son Daniel Gustav Schreber, died by suicide.

According to Alice Miller, Schreber was a foremost figure of what she called poisonous pedagogy, in a translation of Katharina Rutschky's term Schwarze Pädagogik (literally: black pedagogy). Miller analysed the social impact of this rigid attitude towards child rearing and pedagogy.

Miller wrote in this context: "The father of the paranoid patient Schreber whom Freud described, had written several educational books, which were so successful in Germany that some of them were reprinted forty times and translated into several languages."

The influence of this pedagogy on Daniel Paul Schreber has also been analyzed by Morton Schatzman (Soul Murder: Persecution in the Family (ISBN 0-394-48148-8), 1974) and other authors.

== Notes and references ==
- (in German) Katharina Rutschky: Schwarze Pädagogik. Quellen zur Naturgeschichte der bürgerlichen Erziehung, 6. Aufl., Ullstein: Frankfurt/Main 1993, ISBN 3-548-34453-4. ("Schwarze Pädagogik", literally "black pedagogy", translates to "Poisonous pedagogy")
- (in German) Wolfgang Treher: Hitler, Steiner, Schreber, Gäste aus einer anderen Welt, 2. Auflage 1990, Emmendingen, ISBN 3-921031-00-1 ("Hitler, Steiner, Schreber, guests from another world.")
- Alice Miller: The Childhood Trauma. Transcript of a lecture given at YWHA in New York City, 1998-10-22. Retrieved on 2007-06-24.
- see also Daniel Paul Schreber for more references
