= Poisonous pedagogy =

Human Behavior

In sociology and psychology, poisonous pedagogy, also called black pedagogy (from the original German name schwarze Pädagogik), is any traditional child-raising methods which modern pedagogy considers repressive and harmful. It includes behaviours and communication that theorists consider to be manipulative or violent, such as extreme forms of corporal punishment.

== Origin and definitions ==
The concept was first introduced by Katharina Rutschky in her 1977 work Schwarze Pädagogik. Quellen zur Naturgeschichte der bürgerlichen Erziehung. The psychologist Alice Miller used the concept to describe child-raising approaches that, she believed, damage a child's emotional development. Miller claims that this alleged emotional damage promotes adult behavior harmful to individuals. She explains how poisonous pedagogy in the name of "child rearing" leads to dysfunctions and neurosis of all kinds. For instance in her book For Your Own Good she discussed its common impact on three distinct lives: Adolf Hitler, Jürgen Bartsch and Christiane F., whereas in The Body Never Lies, she talks about the impact of childhood trauma and repressed emotions on the human body.

"Poisonous pedagogy" is described by these theorists as what happens when a parent (or teacher, nurse, or other caregiver) believes that a young child's behavior demonstrates that the child is infected with the "seeds of evil", and therefore attempts to weed out the evil, either by emotional manipulation or by brute force. Simple examples include the beating of children as punishment for lying, or mothers who refuse to feed their newborn until a set time, in order to "teach him patience, which will be useful for him in later life".

Poisonous pedagogy, in Katharina Rutschky's definition, aims to inculcate a social superego in the child, to construct a basic defense against drives in the child's psyche, to toughen the child for later life, and to instrumentalize the body parts and senses in favor of socially defined functions. Although not explicitly, "poisonous pedagogy" serves, these theorists allege, as a rationalization of sadism and a defense against the feelings of the parent himself or of the person involved.

For methods, Rutschky claims, "poisonous pedagogy" makes use of initiation rites (for example, internalizing a threat of death), the application of pain (including psychological), the totalitarian supervision of the child (body control, behavior, obedience, prohibition of lying, etc.), taboos against touching, the denial of basic needs, and an extreme desire for order.

== Historical background ==
=== Ancient cultures ===
The Roman poets Plautus, Horace, Martial, and Juvenal described corporal punishments in schools. It is also written in the Bible, Proverbs 13:24. "Whoever spares the rod hates their children, but the one who loves their children is careful to discipline them." Corporal punishment was widespread in all of these civilizations.

The expression "Spare the rod and spoil the child" is a satirical parody of a verse from the Bible, Proverbs, 13:24, and was adapted by Samuel Butler in the satirical poem Hudibras.

=== Germany ===
In the 18th century common notions of the evil nature of children or of taming bear witness to superstitions and the wish to be able to train human beings like animals.

One German child-raising book in the 18th century said: "These first years have, among other things, the advantage that one can use force and compulsion. With age children forget everything they encountered in their early childhood. Thus if one can take away children's will, they will not remember afterward that they had had a will."

In Germany the parental right to discipline was abolished by a change in the law in 2000. The Federal Minister for Family Affairs from 1994 to 1998 Claudia Nolte had wanted to maintain parents' right to use mild spanking, contrary to the views of Alice Miller in her 1980 book For Your Own Good.

Miller has written: "I understand 'black pedagogy' to be a parenting approach that is directed toward breaking the will of the child, in order to make it an obedient subject, with the aid of open or concealed use of force, manipulation, and repression."

== Psychological background ==
A relevant criterion in defining poisonous pedagogy is if a manipulative approach reveals behavioural issues in the parent such as a blindness to feelings, cruelty, or a tendency toward violence, or if strong negative emotions such as anger or hate are being discharged, emotions against which the juvenile or infant psyche, with its age-based limitations, cannot defend itself.

Miller also came to the conclusion, as a result of her therapeutic work, that she needed to "work on" her own childhood in order to understand her clients better. She takes the view that "poisonous pedagogy" is a behavior that is passed on from generation to generation by being euphemized and sanitized.

== Personalities ==
Influential advocates of various forms of corporal punishment include John Harvey Kellogg, Moritz Schreber, and others.

== Discussion and criticism ==
Alice Miller defines poisonous pedagogy as all types of behavior that she believes is intended to manipulate children's characters through force or deception. Her focus is not merely on smacking (although she has said that "Every smack is a humiliation" and clearly opposes corporal punishment) but also on various other forms of manipulation, deceit, hypocrisy, and coercion, which she argues are commonly used by parents and teachers against children.

Frank Furedi , Sociology professor and founder of the UK's Revolutionary Communist Party believes that such declarations are too sweeping and disconnected from reality. Furedi labels many advocates of a total ban on physical punishment as being against all forms of punishing children. He sees the underlying agenda as an anti-parent crusade, and argues that some research on the effects of spanking is far less clear-cut than the claims made on its behalf by what he calls "anti-smacking zealots".

In 1975, Prescott outlined a link between violence and disruption of the child-mother bonding process in human societies, drawing on a cross-cultural study of Aboriginal societies and a statistical analysis of those cultures' practices towards the nurturing of the natural child-mother bonding process, and an examination of historical attitudes towards children from Euramerican literature and the historical record. He concluded that the disrupted child-mother bonding process was an absolute predictor of the emergence of violence, hierarchy, rigid gender roles, a dominatory psychology and violent territorial acquisition.

Prescott states that the research showed that over time, disruptive practices become the 'norm' and as generations grow and pass on these practices, the society in question begins to demonstrate a clear lack of empathy, and violence is codified. The history of poisonous pedagogy, in his view, is the history of this codification of these non-nurturant practices. It is upon these that current transmitted practice is found.

== See also ==
- Child abuse
- Child discipline
- Corporal punishment
- Critical pedagogy
- Emotional abuse
- Pedagogy
- Physical punishment
- Punishment
- Spanking
