= Jugendamt =

German and Austrian youth welfare agency

Jugendamt (lit. 'youth office') is a German agency set up to promote the welfare of children. Each district (Kreis) or district-free city (kreisfreie Stadt) has its own Jugendamt. Its structure is flat, with no centralised (state or federal) coordinating office. In Germany the youth offices were created during Weimar Republic by the Reich Youth Welfare Act (Reichsgesetz für Jugendwohlfahrt) of 1922, in force since 1924. Since the local organizations function independently there is no federal administrative supervision.

== Statistics ==
The Federal Statistics Bureau (Statistisches Bundesamt) shows a steep rise in the number of children with problems taken by Jugendämter yearly into safeguarding.

- 23,432 in 1995
- 25,664 in 2005
- 77,645 in 2015
- 61,383 in 2017

The main reason for this is the high number of unaccompanied child refugees, who are by law required to be taken into safeguard by a Jugendamt (e.g. 45,000 in 2016). Among the children (age 0–13) more than 50% return to their parents within two weeks.

== See also ==
- Children's rights
- European Center for Constitutional and Human Rights
- Human rights in Germany
- Parliamentary Petitions Office
- Helmut Kentler

=== Similar organizations in other countries ===
- Bureau Jeugdzorg and Raad voor de Kinderbescherming Netherlands
- Child Protective Services USA
- Children and Family Court Advisory and Support Service England and Wales
- Norwegian Child Welfare Services
