= Paul Flechsig =

German neuroanatomist, psychiatrist and neuropathologist

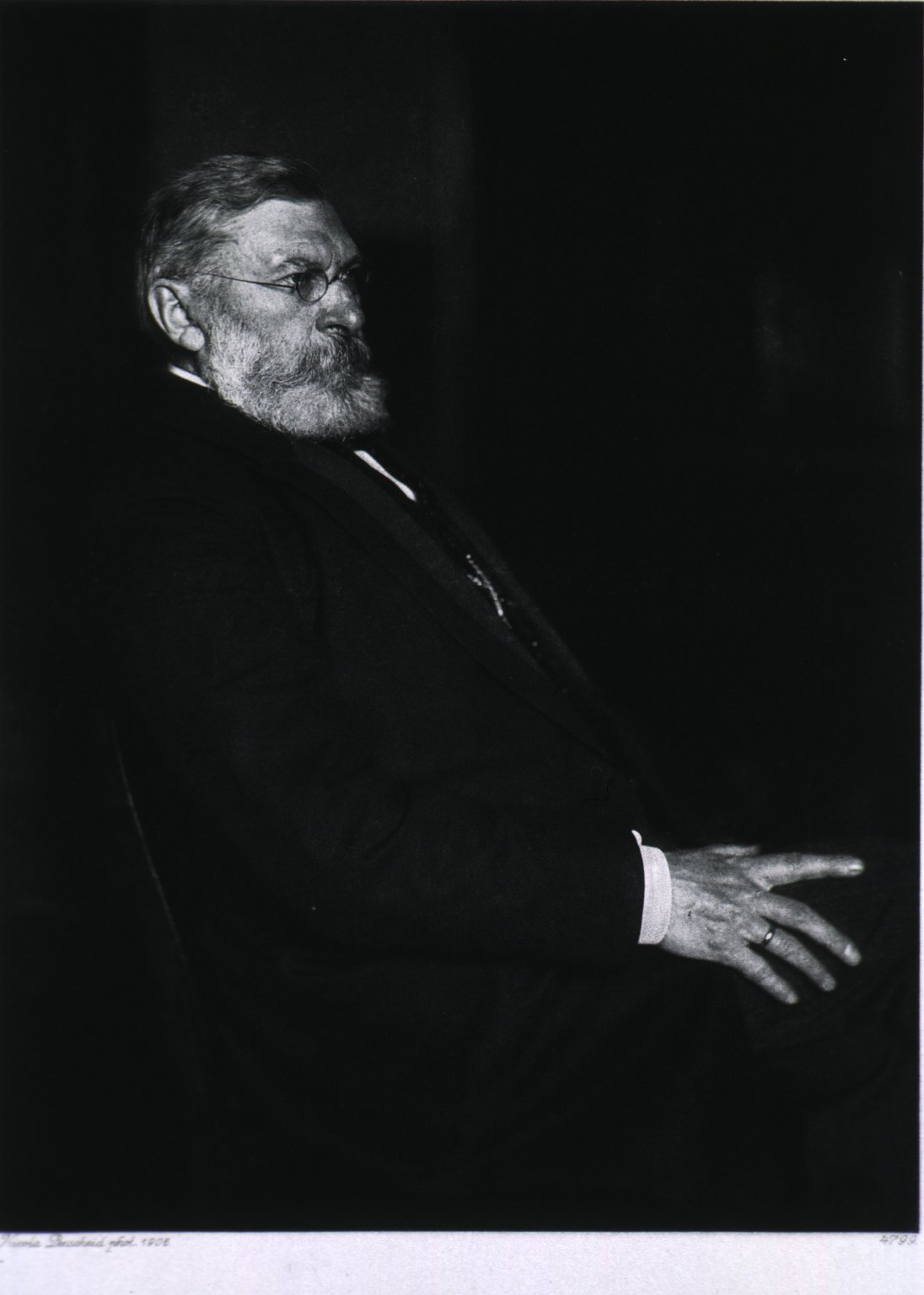
- Flechsig in 1906
- Born: Paul Emil Flechsig; 29 June 1847; Zwickau, Kingdom of Saxony
- Died: 22 July 1929 (aged 82); Leipzig, Germany
- Education: University of Leipzig
- Known for: Research on myelinogenesis
- Scientific career
- Fields: Neuroanatomy; Psychiatry; Neuropathology
- Workplaces: University of Leipzig; Clinical Institute of Psychiatry and Neurology

Paul Emil Flechsig (29 June 1847, Zwickau, Kingdom of Saxony – 22 July 1929, Leipzig) was a German neuroanatomist, psychiatrist and neuropathologist. He is mainly remembered today for his research of myelinogenesis.

== Biography ==
Born in Zwickau, he received his education at the University of Leipzig and in 1884 became professor of psychiatry there. In 1882, he became director of the Clinical Institute of Psychiatry and Neurology at Leipzig. He made personal investigations of the European systems for the treatment of the insane, on which he was a recognized authority. He spent over fifty years of his medical career at Leipzig.

Although Flechsig contributed much in his study of neurological disorders, he is mainly remembered today for his research of myelinogenesis. Among his students were Emil Kraepelin and Oskar Vogt (mentor to Korbinian Brodmann). Flechsig was the treating psychiatrist for Daniel Paul Schreber, whose memoir inspired Sigmund Freud to publish a detailed analysis of the case in 1911. Flechsig's work has still not been rediscovered widely but his map was reprinted and discussed in Fuster's "Cortex and Mind".

Myelinogenesis is a technique he pioneered in which he studied brains of the late term fetus and newborn by staining for myelin. Between about two months before and after birth, most of the cerebral cortex becomes myelinated. The order in which this happens appears to reflect the evolutionary order of mammals from less to more complex. He derived a map of the cerebral cortex divided not by histology (as Korbinian Brodmann did) but by order of myelination.

Flechsig divided the cortical regions into:

1. an early myelinating primitive zone, which includes the motor cortex and the visual, auditory, and somatosensory cortex;
2. a field bordering the primitive zone that myelinates next;
3. a late-myelinating zone, which he called “association”.

The last area of the human cerebral cortex to myelinate is the Dorsolateral Prefrontal cortex. (Flechsig #45, Brodmann areas 9 & 46). This region continues to develop in adolescence and adulthood it is related to executive function and working memory.

In a 1927 review in the Journal of The American Medical Association (JAMA) of his last monograph one finds the following:

Flechsig, the 80 year old neuro-anatomist, is one of the few great scientists that furthered greatly the knowledge of the finer anatomy of the brain. He is the chief exponent of that phase of neuro-anatomy which deals mainly with distribution and the course of nerve fibers, their formation into systems, and their mutual relationship. His great service to science was his so-called method. This is based the fact that the time at which various systems of fibers making up the brain become covered with myelin varies. For instance, the sensory root fibers become myelinated before the motor; the upper branch of the vestibular nerve becomes myelinated before the lower. Therefore, by studying the fiber systems in embryos of various ages it became possible for Flechsig and his pupils not only to establish new systems of central nerve fibers but also to correct many mistakes. Flechsig was so enthusiastic about his method that he utilized it with some success in establishing what he called association centers which he believed are the seats of psychic activity. Because of Flechsig's high position in science, his clinic and laboratory were visited by many famous scientists, of whom he briefly speaks in the first part of the booklet where he gives a brief sketch of his life. Of the visitors he mentions Woodrow Wilson and his daughter ("one" Professor Wilson who introduced himself as president of "Princetown" University). The purpose of the visit was to ask Flechsig to "recommend him a neurologist for Princeton University." Some high German officials urged Flechsig, during the peace proceedings at Versailles, at the close of the World War, to utilize his acquaintance with Wilson and ask him for easier peace terms for Germany. Generally this little book is a brief summary of the advances made by Flechsig and his school in the field of brain anatomy during an unusually fruitful period of activity covering fifty- five years.

The "Paul-Flechsig-Institute of Brain Research" at the University of Leipzig is an institution established in 1974 in tribute to Flechsig. The institute's scientific emphases is on cellular and molecular aspects of neurodegenerative diseases and glial reactions in the brain and the retina.

Flechsig's fasciculus or Flechsig's tract is a neurological structure which conveys proprioceptive information from the body to the cerebellum.

== Bibliography ==
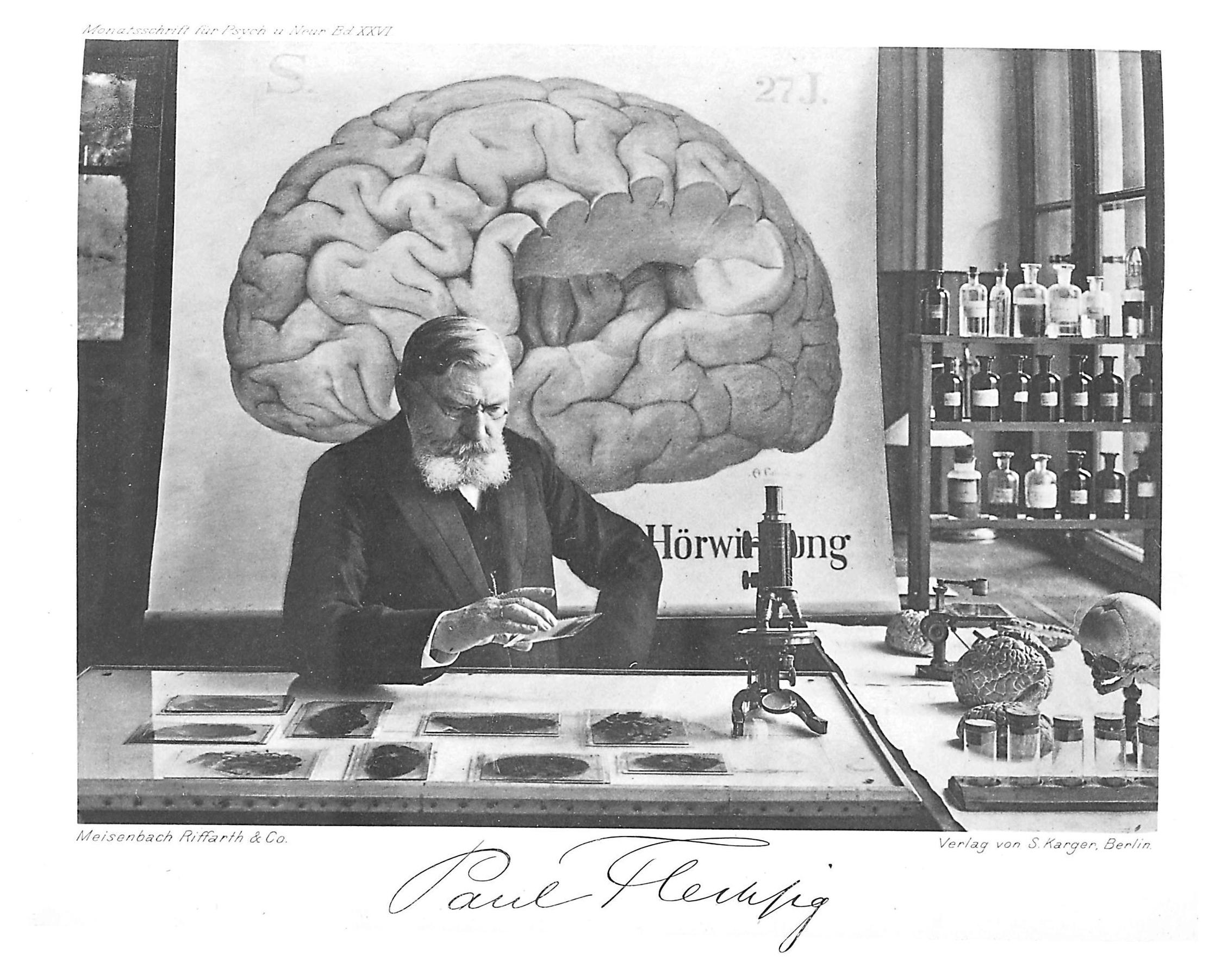
Paul Flechsig (1847-1929)

- Die Leitungsbahnen im Gehirn und Rückenmark des Menschen auf Grund entwicklungsgeschichtlicher Untersuchungen dargestellt (1876)
- Ueber Darstellung und chemische Natur des Cellulosezuckers. Zeitschrift für Physiologische Chemie 7: 523-540 (1882–83)
- Die Irrenklinik der Universität Leipzig in den Jahren 1882-86 (1887)
- Ueber eine neue Färbungsmethode des centralen Nervensystems und deren Ergebnisse bezüglich des Zusammenhanges von Ganglienzellen und Nervenfasern. Archiv für Physiologie: 537-538 (1889)
- Gehirn und Seele (1896)
- Die Localisation der geistigen Vorgänge insbesondere der Sinnesempfindungen des Menschen: Vortrag gehalten auf der 68. (1896)
- Anatomie des menschlichen Gehirns und Rückenmarks auf myelogenetischer Grundlage (1920)
- Die myelogenetische Gliederung der Leitungsbahnen des Linsenkerns beim Menschen. Berichte über die Verhandlungen der Königlich Sächsischen Gesellschaft der Wissenschaften zu Leipzig: Mathematisch-Physische Klasse 73: 295-302 (1921)
