= Michael Rutschky =

German author (1943–2018)

Michael Rutschky (25 May 1943 in Berlin – 18 March 2018 in Berlin) was a German author.

== Life ==
Michael Rutschky grew up in Spangenberg, Hesse. From 1963 to 1971, he studied Sociology, Literature and Philosophy at Frankfurt am Main (under Theodor W. Adorno, Jürgen Habermas and others), Göttingen and Freie Universität Berlin. From 1969 to 1978, he worked as a social researcher at Freie Universität Berlin, where he earned a doctorate. From 1979 to 1984, he lived in Munich, where he was an editor of Merkur and TransAtlantik. In 1985 he moved back to Berlin. From 1985 to 1997, he was contributing editor to the periodical Der Alltag.

Michael Rutschky wrote essays with an original mixture of narrative passages and sociological interpretation of the everyday, often to comical effect.

Michael Rutschky was a member of the German PEN center. He received the 1997 Heinrich Mann Prize; in 1999 he held was the visiting poetics lecturer at the University of Heidelberg. He was a visiting scholar at the Villa Concordia in Bamberg.

He was married to the educationalist and publisher Katharina Rutschky until her death in January 2010.

== Works ==
- Schüler im Literaturunterricht ("Students in literature class"), Cologne 1975 (together with Hartmut Eggert and Hans Christoph Berg)
- Studien zur psychoanalytischen Interpretation von Literatur ("Studies in the psychoanalytical interpretation of literature"), Berlin 1978
- Erfahrungshunger ("Hunger for experience"), Cologne 1980
- Lektüre der Seele ("Reading the soul"), Frankfurt am Main 1981
- Wartezeit ("Waiting"), Cologne 1983
- Zur Ethnographie des Inlands ("On domestic ethnography"), Frankfurt am Main 1984
- Auf Reisen ("Traveling"), Frankfurt am Main 1986
- Was man zum Leben wissen muss ("What to know about life"), Zurich 1987
- Thomas – mach ein Bild von uns! ("Thomas: take a picture of us!"), Munich 1988 (with Thomas Karsten and Peter Brasch)
- Reise durch das Ungeschick und andere Meisterstücke ("Voyage through awkwardness and other masterpieces"), Zurich 1990
- Mit Dr. Siebert in Amerika ("With Dr. Siebert in America"), Zurich 1991
- Traumnachrichten ("Dream messages"), Hersbruck 1991
- Unterwegs im Beitrittsgebiet ("Travels in the new German states"), Göttingen 1994
- Die Meinungsfreude ("The joy of opinion"), Göttingen 1997
- Der verborgene Brecht ("The hidden Brecht"), Zurich 1997 (with Juergen Teller)
- Lebensromane (Life novels), Göttingen 1998
- Berlin, Berlin 2001
- Wie wir Amerikaner wurden (How we became Americans), Munich 2004

== Publisher ==
- Errungenschaften (Achievements), Frankfurt am Main 1982
- Ein Jahresbericht (The Yearly Report), Frankfurt am Main 1983
- Tag für Tag (Day for Day), Frankfurt am Main 1984
- Die andere Chronik (The Other Chronicle) 1987, Cologne 1987
