= Will McBride (photographer) =

American photographer (1931-2015)

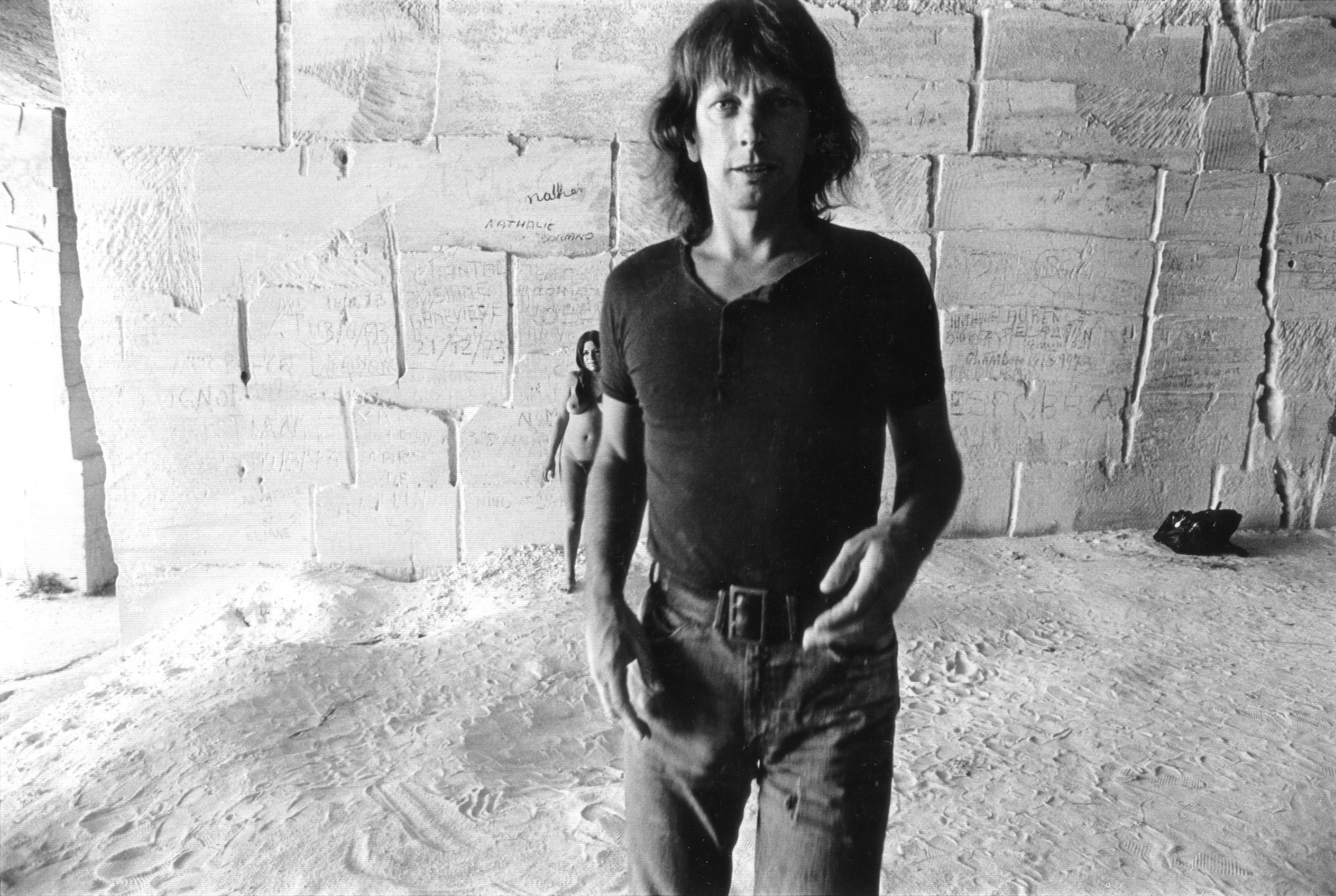
- McBride with a nude female model in the background in 1975
- Born: January 10, 1931; St. Louis, Missouri, U.S.
- Died: January 29, 2015 (aged 84); U.S.
- Occupation: Photographer

Will McBride (January 10, 1931 – January 29, 2015) was an American photographer in reportage, art photography and book illustration as well as a painter and sculptor.

== Life ==
McBride was born in St. Louis, Missouri and grew up in Chicago. He was trained as a painter by Norman Rockwell and went on to study drawing and painting at Syracuse University, where he graduated in 1953. From 1953 to 1955 he served in the United States Army at Würzburg, Germany as a lieutenant, and would remain in Germany until his death.

In 1969, McBride divorced his wife Barbara (née Wilke, married 1959), with whom he had three children: Shawn, Robin, and Brian.

His work has been published in the German youth magazine Twen, among other European magazines. Twen provoked a scandal when they published McBride's portraits of his pregnant wife Barbara in 1960.

The bulk of his photography work is not often seen in the USA. McBride's work includes nudity and has experienced censorship. McBride received censure for the photography in his 1975 book Show Me! (German title Zeig Mal!).

Solo exhibitions of his work since 2000 have included at the Galleria d'Arte Moderna, Bologna, the Dany Keller Galerie, Munich, Galerie argus fotokunst, Haus am Waldsee, Berlin and C/O Berlin.

In 2004 McBride received the Dr. Erich Salomon Prize from the German Society for Photography.

He died in 2015, age 84.

== The Will McBride Archive ==
Following an agreement between the heirs, ownership of McBride's entire artistic estate, including 65 years of photographic production and correspondence are incorporated in the Will McBride Archive located in Bristow, Germany. This includes the ownership of copyright which has passed to his son, Shawn M. McBride.

The archive is accessible for research, collaborates with publishers and facilitates exhibitions, confirms authenticity of work and issues a limited number of reprints.

== Selected books ==
- Show Me!, 1975. (German title Zeig Mal!).
- Foto-Tagebuch 1953 - 1961, 1982.
- Adenauer und seine Kinder - Fotografien von 1956-1968, 1994.
- My Sixties, 1994.
- I, Will McBride, 1997. (Retrospective)
- Coming of Age, Aperture, 1999. (Introductory essay, "Ways of Being Human", by Guy Davenport).
- Situationen Projekte: Ein Fotobuch, 2000.
- McBride, Will (2013), Bertram, Mathias (ed.), Berlin im Aufbruch. Fotografien 1956-1963, Leipzig: Lehmstedt
