= Alice Miller (psychologist) =

Swiss psychologist (1923–2010)

- Born: Alicja Englard; 12 January 1923; Piotrków Trybunalski, Poland
- Died: 14 April 2010 (aged 87); Saint-Rémy de Provence, France
- Known for: Psychology, psychohistory, psychoanalysis, philosophy
- Children: 2, including Martin Miller

Alice Miller (Swiss Standard German: [ˈmɪlər]; born Alicja Englard; 12 January 1923 – 14 April 2010) was a Polish-Swiss psychologist, psychoanalyst, and philosopher noted for her books on parental child abuse, translated into several languages. She was also a noted public intellectual. Her 1979 book The Drama of the Gifted Child caused a sensation and became an international bestseller upon the English publication in 1981. Her views on the consequences of child abuse became highly influential in the fields of child development, psychotherapy, and trauma. In her books she departed from psychoanalysis, charging it with being similar to the poisonous pedagogies.

Miller systemically critiqued Freudian concepts like the Oedipus complex as an attempt to reinterpret or obscure the reality of child abuse. Core to Miller's writings was that the suppression of childhood truths (which perpetuates the psychological groundwork for violence, authoritarianism, war, mental illness, and systemic cruelty) is both a crime against humanity and a universal and enduring taboo against the true self, by privileging the authority of parents, tradition, religion, morality, or society over the needs of children. In a New York Times obituary, British psychologist Oliver James was quoted saying that Miller was "almost as influential as R.D. Laing".

== Life ==
Alicja Englard was born in Piotrków Trybunalski, Poland into an affluent Orthodox Jewish family. She was the oldest daughter of Gutta and Meylech Englard. Her younger sister, Irena, was born five years later. From 1931 to 1933 the family lived in Berlin, where nine-year-old Alicja learned the German language. Due to the National Socialists' seizure of power in Germany in 1933, the family was forced to return to Piotrków Trybunalski. Shortly after the start of World War II, in October 1939 the Nazis interned all Jewish Piotrków Trybunalski inhabitants (including Miller and her family) at the Piotrków Trybunalski Ghetto, when Miller was sixteen years old. Miller quickly began planning her escape and assumed a non-Jewish name, Alicja Rostowska. Miller eventually succeeded in smuggling herself, her mother, and her sister out of the ghetto, but was forced to leave her father behind as he spoke only Yiddish and had little chance of passing as a non-Jew in Nazi-occupied Poland. In 1941, her father died of illness in the ghetto, months before all remaining inhabitants (including Miller's paternal grandparents) were liquidated to the Majdanek and Treblinka extermination camps.

After escaping the ghetto, Miller hid her mother and sister in a Catholic convent in Warsaw where, against the protests of her mother, Miller arranged for her sister to be baptized to ensure the family would not be outed as Jews. Upon urging from Miller's mother, Miller responded to an ad for an apartment, which unbeknownst to the family was posted by a szmalcownik (an undercover Gestapo informant who blackmailed Jews by threatening to expose them to the Nazis) named Andrzej (Andreas) Miller. Andrzej threatened to out Miller, and, according to Martin Miller's 2013 biography of his mother, The True "Drama of the Gifted Child", Miller narrowly escaped certain death by seducing and later marrying Andrzej, a fact that Miller would keep secret for the remainder of her life.

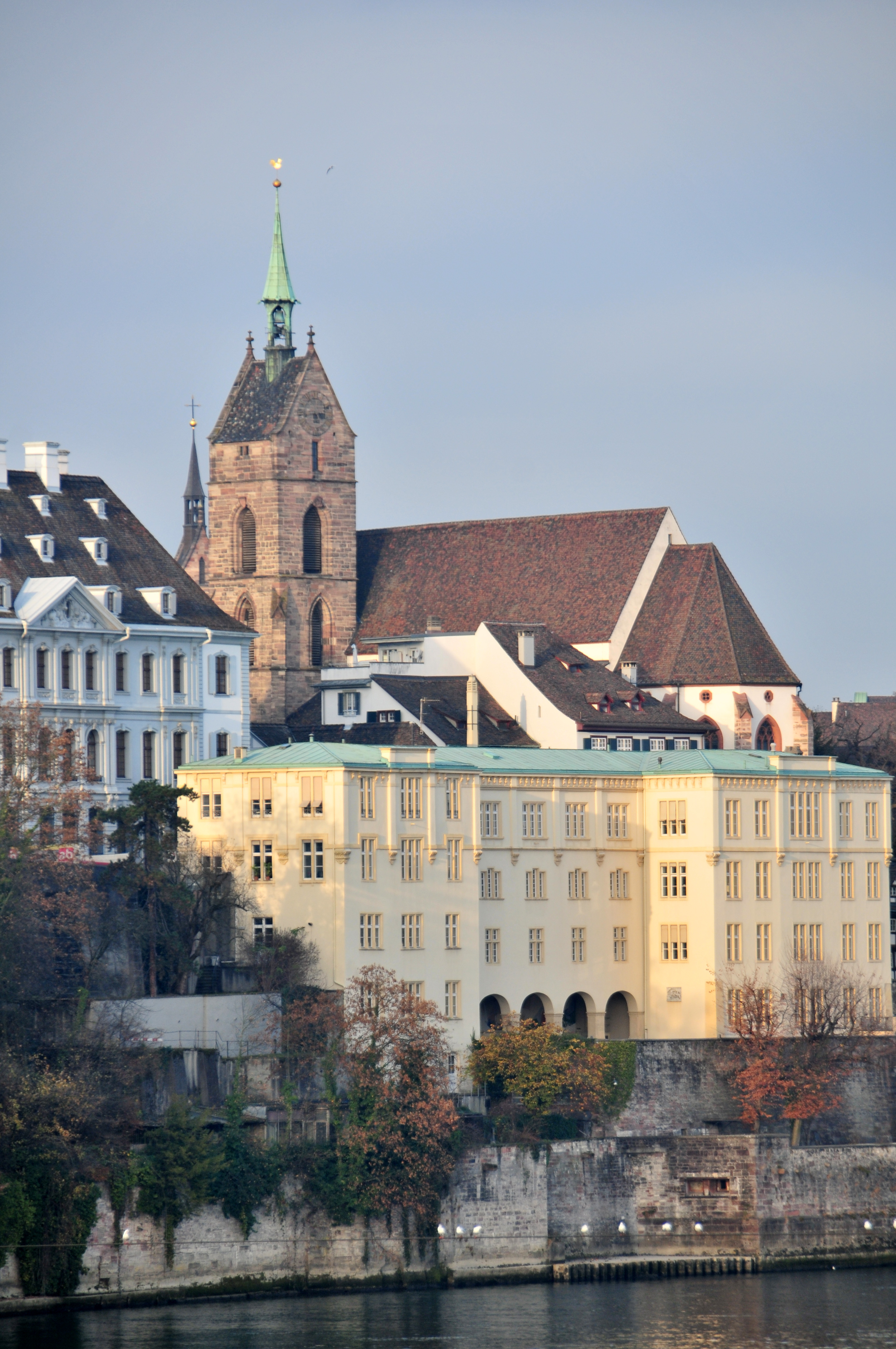
The University of Basel, where Alice Miller started studying in 1946.

In 1946, Miller (under her assumed name Alicja Rostowska) and Andrzej moved from Poland to Switzerland, where the couple had won scholarships to study at the University of Basel. In 1949, she married Andreas, who was completing a doctorate in sociology. They had two children, Martin (born 1950) and Julika (born 1956), who was born with Down's Syndrome. They divorced in 1973. Shortly after his mother's death, Martin stated in an interview with Der Spiegel and later in his book The True "Drama of the Gifted Child", that in the presence of his mother, he had been routinely beaten and sexually abused by Andreas, who was anti-semitic and authoritarian. Martin stated that his mother did not intervene in her son's abuse and was herself emotionally neglectful, experiences which Miller later drew upon to inform her subsequent theories on child abuse. Martin also mentioned that his mother was unable to share her wartime experiences with him, despite numerous lengthy conversations, and she was severely traumatized by them.

In 1953 Miller got her doctorate in philosophy, psychology and sociology. Between 1953 and 1960, Miller studied psychoanalysis and practiced it between 1960 and 1980 in Zürich. In 1980, after having worked as a psychoanalyst and an analyst trainer for 20 years, Miller "stopped practicing and teaching psychoanalysis in order to explore childhood systematically." She became critical of both Sigmund Freud and Carl Jung. Her first three books originated from research she took upon herself as a response to what she felt were major blind spots in her field. However, by the time her fourth book was published, she no longer believed that psychoanalysis was viable in any respect.

In 1985 Miller wrote about the research from her time as a psychoanalyst: "For twenty years I observed people denying their childhood traumas, idealising their parents and resisting the truth about their childhood by any means." In 1985 she left Switzerland and moved to Saint-Rémy-de-Provence in Southern France. In 1986, she was awarded the Janusz Korczak Literary Award for her book Thou Shalt Not Be Aware: Society's Betrayal of the Child.

In April 1987 Miller announced in an interview with the German magazine Psychologie Heute (Psychology Today) her rejection of psychoanalysis. The following year she cancelled her memberships in both the Swiss Psychoanalytic Society and the International Psychoanalytic Association, because she felt that psychoanalytic theory and practice made it impossible for former victims of child abuse to recognise the violations inflicted on them and to resolve the consequences of the abuse, as they "remained in the old tradition of blaming the child and protecting the parents".

One of Miller's last books, Bilder meines Lebens ("Pictures of My Life"), was published in 2006. It is an informal autobiography in which the writer explores her emotional process from painful childhood, through the development of her theories and later insights, told via the display and discussion of 66 of her original paintings, painted in the years 1973–2005. Between 2005 and her death in 2010, she answered hundreds of readers' letters on her website, where there are also published articles, flyers and interviews in three languages. Days before her death Alice Miller wrote: "These letters will stay as an important witness also after my death under my copyright". Miller died on 14 April 2010, at the age of 87, at her home in Saint-Rémy-de-Provence, by means of assisted suicide, after severe illness and diagnosis of advanced-stage pancreatic cancer. She was survived by her two children, including Martin Miller.

== Work ==
Miller extended the trauma model to include all forms of child abuse and neglect, including those that are commonly accepted (such as spanking and leaving infants to cry to avoid "spoiling" a child), which she called "poisonous pedagogy", a non-literal translation of Katharina Rutschky's Schwarze Pädagogik (black or dark pedagogy/imprinting). Drawing upon the work of psychohistory, Miller analyzed writers Virginia Woolf, Franz Kafka and others to find links between their childhood traumas and the course and outcome of their lives. Miller also analyzed the role of fiction, storytelling and fairy tales—especially classic European stories—as cultural artifacts that reflect deep psychological truths about childhood suffering that are passed down as unconscious expressions of real, often unspoken childhood experiences—especially those involving mistreatment or abandonment by parents.

The introduction to the first chapter in Miller's first book, The Drama of the Gifted Child, first published in 1979, contains a line that summarises her core view. In it, she writes:

Experience has taught us that we have only one enduring weapon in our struggle against mental illness: the emotional discovery and emotional acceptance of the truth in the individual and unique history of our childhood.

A common denominator in Miller's writings is her explanation of why human beings prefer not to know about their own victimisation during childhood: to avoid unbearable pain. She believed that the unconscious command of the individual, not to be aware of how they were treated in childhood, led to displacement: the irresistible drive to repeat abusive parenting in the next generation of children or direct unconsciously the unresolved trauma against others (war, terrorism, delinquency), or against themselves (eating disorders, drug addiction, depression).

In her writings, Miller is careful to clarify that by "abuse" she does not only mean physical violence or sexual abuse, but also psychological abuse and emotional neglect perpetrated by one or both parents on their child, which is difficult to for the abused person to identify and process because humans have an evolutionary drive to repress feelings of betrayal, rage, and self-protection so that they can continue to receive their parents' protection and acceptance. Formerly abused children are likely to repress feelings and memories of their childhood, which may be triggered by a stressful life event, or the onset of mental illness. Miller blamed psychologically neglectful or abusive parents for the majority of neuroses and psychoses. She maintained that all instances of mental illness, addiction, crime and cultism were ultimately caused by suppressed rage and pain as a result of subconscious childhood trauma that was not resolved emotionally, assisted by a helper, which she came to term an "enlightened witness." In all cultures, "sparing the parents is our supreme law," wrote Miller. Even psychiatrists, psychoanalysts and clinical psychologists were unconsciously afraid to blame parents for the mental disorders of their clients, she contended. According to Miller, mental health professionals were also creatures of the poisonous pedagogy internalized in their own childhood. This explained why the Commandment "Honor thy parents" was one of the main targets in Miller's school of psychology.

Miller called electroconvulsive therapy "a campaign against the act of remembering". In her book Abbruch der Schweigemauer (The Demolition of Silence), she also criticized psychotherapists' advice to clients to forgive their abusive parents, arguing that this could only hinder recovery through remembering and feeling childhood pain. It was her contention that the majority of therapists fear this truth and that they work under the influence of interpretations culled from both Western and Oriental religions, which preach forgiveness by the once-mistreated child. She believed that forgiveness did not resolve hatred, but covered it in a dangerous way in the grown adult: displacement on scapegoats, as she discussed in her psycho-biographies of Adolf Hitler and Jürgen Bartsch, both of whom she described as having suffered severe parental abuse. In the 1990s, Miller initially supported a version of primal therapy developed by Konrad Stettbacher. Miller initially learned of Stettbacher's method from a book by Mariella Mehr titled Steinzeit (Stone Age). Having been strongly impressed by the book, Miller contacted Mehr in order to get the name of the therapist. Later, Stettbacher was charged with incidents of sexual abuse. From that time forward, Miller refused to make therapist or method recommendations. In open letters to the public, Miller explained why she originally supported Stettbacher's methods, but in the end she distanced herself from him and his regressive therapies.

=== Roots of violence ===
According to Alice Miller, worldwide violence has its roots in the fact that children are beaten or emotionally neglected all over the world, especially during their first years of life as infants, when the human brain becomes structured in response to its environment. She said that the damage caused by these practices is devastating, but unfortunately hardly noticed by society. She argued that as children are forbidden to defend themselves against the violence inflicted on them, they must suppress the natural reactions like rage and fear, and they discharge these strong emotions later as adults against their own children or whole peoples: "child abuse like beating and humiliating not only produces unhappy and confused children, not only destructive teenagers and abusive parents, but thus also a confused, irrationally functioning society". Miller stated that only through becoming aware of this dynamic can we break the chain of violence.

== Writings ==
The following is a brief summary of Miller's books.

=== The Drama of the Gifted Child (Das Drama des begabten Kindes, 1979) ===
In her first book (also published under the titles Prisoners of Childhood and The Drama of Being a Child), Miller defined and elaborated the personality manifestations of childhood trauma. She addressed the two reactions to the loss of love in childhood, depression and grandiosity; the inner prison, the vicious circle of contempt, repressed memories, the etiology of depression, and how childhood trauma manifests itself in the adult. Miller writes:

"Quite often I have been faced with patients who have been praised and admired for their talents and their achievements. According to prevailing, general attitudes these people—the pride of their parents—should have had a strong stable sense of self-assurance. But exactly the opposite is the case… In my work with these people, I found that every one of them has a childhood history that seems significant to me:

- There was a mother who at the core was emotionally insecure, and who depended for her narcissistic equilibrium on the child behaving, or acting, in a particular way. This mother was able to hide her insecurity from the child and from everyone else behind a hard, authoritarian and even totalitarian façade.
- This child had an amazing ability to perceive and respond intuitively, that is, unconsciously, to this need of the mother or of both parents, for him to take on the role that had unconsciously been assigned to him.
- This role secured "love" for the child—that is, his parents' exploitation. He could sense that he was needed, and this need, guaranteed him a measure of existential security.

This ability is then extended and perfected. Later, these children not only become mothers (confidantes, advisers, supporters) of their own mothers, but also take over the responsibility for their siblings and eventually develop a special sensitivity to unconscious signals manifesting the needs of others."

=== For Your Own Good (Am Anfang war Erziehung, 1980) ===
Miller proposed here that German traumatic childrearing produced heroin addict Christiane F., serial killer of children Jürgen Bartsch, and dictator Adolf Hitler. Children learn to accept their parents' often abusive behaviour against themselves as being "for their own good." In the case of Hitler, it led to displacement against the Jews and other minority groups. For Miller, the traditional pedagogic process of spanking was manipulative, resulting in grown-up adults deferring excessively to authorities, even to tyrannical leaders or dictators, like Hitler. Miller even argued for abandoning the term "pedagogy" in favour of the word "support," something akin to what psychohistorians call the helping mode of parenting.

The key element that Miller elucidated in this book was the understanding of why the German nation, the "good Germans," were compliant with Hitler's abusive regime, which Miller asserted was a direct result of how the society in general treated its children. She raised fundamental questions about current, worldwide child-rearing practices and issued a stern warning.

=== Thou Shalt Not Be Aware (Du sollst nicht merken, 1981) ===
Unlike Miller's later books, this one is written in a semi-academic style. It was her first critique of psychoanalysis, charging it with being similar to the poisonous pedagogies, which she described in For Your Own Good. Miller was critical of both Freud and Carl Jung. She scrutinised Freud's drive theory, a device that, according to her and Jeffrey Masson, blames the child for the abusive sexual behaviour of adults. Miller also theorised about Franz Kafka, who was abused by his father but fulfilled the politically correct function of mirroring abuse in metaphorical novels, instead of exposing it. In the chapter entitled "The Pain of Separation and Autonomy," Miller examined the authoritarian (e.g.: Old Testament, Papist, Calvinist) interpretation of Judeo-Christian theism and its parallels to modern parenting practice, asserting that it was Jesus's father Joseph who should be credited with Jesus's departure from the dogmatic Judaism of his time.

=== Pictures of Childhood (1986) and The Untouched Key (Der gemiedene Schlüssel, 1988) ===
This book was partly a psychobiography of Nietzsche, Picasso, Kollwitz and Buster Keaton; in Miller's later book, The Body Never Lies, published in 2005, she included similar analyses of Dostoyevsky, Chekhov, Schiller, Rimbaud, Mishima, Proust and James Joyce. According to Miller, Nietzsche did not experience a loving family and his philosophical output was a metaphor of an unconscious drive against his family's oppressive theological tradition. She believed that the philosophical system was flawed because Nietzsche was unable to make emotional contact with the abused child inside him. Though Nietzsche was severely punished by a father who lost his mind when Nietzsche was a little boy, Miller did not accept the genetic theory of madness. She interpreted Nietzsche's psychotic breakdown as the result of a family tradition of Prussian modes of child-rearing.

=== Banished Knowledge (Das verbannte Wissen, 1988) ===
In this more personal book Miller said that she herself was abused as a child. She also introduced the fundamental concept of "enlightened witness": a person who was willing to support a harmed individual, empathise with her and help her to gain understanding of her own biographical past. Banished Knowledge is autobiographical in another sense. It is a pointer in Miller's thoroughgoing apostasy from her own profession—psychoanalysis. She believed society was colluding with Freud's theories in order to not know the truth about our childhood, a truth that human cultures have "banished." She concluded that the feelings of guilt instilled in our minds since our most tender years reinforce our repression even in the psychoanalytic profession.

=== Breaking Down the Wall of Silence (Abbruch der Schweigemauer, 1990) ===
Written in the aftermath of the fall of the Berlin Wall, Miller took to task the entirety of human culture. What she called the "wall of silence" is the metaphorical wall behind which society — academia, psychiatrists, clergy, politicians and members of the media — has sought to protect itself: denying the mind-destroying effects of child abuse. She also continued the autobiographical confession initiated in Banished Knowledge about her abusive mother. In Pictures of a Childhood: Sixty-six Watercolours and an Essay, Miller said that painting helped her to ponder deeply into her memories. In some of her paintings, Miller depicted baby Alice as swaddled, sometimes by an evil mother.

I betrayed that little girl ... . Only in recent years, with the help of therapy, which enabled me to lift the veil on this repression bit by bit, could I allow myself to experience the pain and desperation, the powerlessness and justified fury of that abused child. Only then did the dimensions of this crime against the child I once was, become clear to me.

== In popular culture ==
After his mother's death, Miller's son Martin Miller published a memoir titled The True "Drama of the Gifted Child" (2013, translated to English in 2018) where he offers a personal account of his mother’s life, examining the discrepancy between her public advocacy for children and her private behavior as a parent. While acknowledging his mother's groundbreaking role in exposing childhood trauma and the enduring legitimacy of her theories, he argues that she failed to apply her own insights within their family due to her unprocessed trauma during World War II and abusive marriage to a szmalcownik. In 2020, a Swiss documentary titled Who is Afraid of Alice Miller? (Swiss: Wer hat Angst vor Alice Miller?) directed by Daniel Howald premiered at international film festivals and on European television. The film explores the life and legacy of Alice Miller through the perspective of her son, Martin Miller. The documentary was nominated for the Prix de Soleure (Jury Award) at the Solothurn Film Festival.

== Bibliography ==
Miller's published books in English

- The Drama of the Gifted Child, (1979), revised in 1995 and re-published by Virago as The Drama of Being a Child. ISBN 1-86049-101-4
- Prisoners of Childhood (1981) ISBN 0-465-06287-3, which is The Drama of the Gifted Child under a different title
- For Your Own Good: Hidden Cruelty in Child-Rearing and the Roots of Violence (full text is available online for free) (1983) ISBN 0-374-52269-3
- Thou Shalt Not Be Aware: Society's Betrayal of the Child (1984) ISBN 0-374-52543-9
- Banished Knowledge: Facing Childhood Injuries ISBN 0-385-26762-2
- The Untouched Key: Tracing Childhood Trauma in Creativity and Destructiveness ISBN 0-385-26764-9
- The Drama of Being a Child : The Search for the True Self (1995)
- Pictures of a Childhood: Sixty-six Watercolours and an Essay ISBN 0-374-23241-5
- Paths of Life: Seven Scenarios (1999) ISBN 0-375-40379-5
- Breaking Down the Wall of Silence: The Liberating Experience of Facing Painful Truth ISBN 0-525-93357-3
- The Truth Will Set You Free: Overcoming Emotional Blindness (2001) ISBN 0-465-04584-7
- The Body Never Lies: The Lingering Effects of Cruel Parenting (2005) ISBN 0-393-06065-9, Excerpt
- Free From Lies: Discovering Your True Needs (2009) ISBN 978-0-393-06913-6

In popular culture

- Are You My Mother? by Alison Bechdel

== See also ==
- Dani Levy
- Narcissistic abuse
- Poisonous pedagogy – further explanation of Miller's theories
- Trauma model of mental disorders
- True self and false self
