= Show Me! =

1974 sex education book by Will McBride

Show Me!: A Picture Book of Sex for Children and Parents
- Author: Helga Fleischhauer-Hardt
- Original title: Zeig mal. Ein Bilderbuch für Kinder und Eltern
- Translator: Hilary Davies
- Illustrator: Will McBride
- Cover artist: Will McBride
- Language: German
- Subject: Sex education
- Genre: Photo-book
- Publisher: Jugenddienst, St. Martin's Press
- Publication date: 1974
- Publication place: Germany
- English publication date: 1975
- Media type: Print (Hardcover)
- Pages: 195 (176 eng. edition)
- ISBN: 3779573180
- OCLC: 74145406
- LC Class: 74-343028

Show Me! is a sex education book by photographer Will McBride. It appeared in 1974 in German under the title Zeig Mal!, written with psychiatrist Helga Fleischhauer-Hardt for children and their parents. It was translated into English a year later and was widely available in bookstores on both sides of the Atlantic for many years, but later became subject to expanded child pornography laws in jurisdictions including the United States. In Germany, the book was followed in 1990 by a second edition that included, among other additions, a discussion of the AIDS epidemic.

== Publication history ==
While many parents appreciated Show Me! for its frank depiction of pre-adolescents discovering and exploring their sexuality, others called it child pornography. In 1975 and 1976, obscenity charges were brought against the publisher or booksellers by prosecutors in Massachusetts, New Hampshire, Oklahoma, and Toronto, Ontario, Canada. In all four cases, the judges ruled as a matter of law that the title was not obscene.

However, starting in 1977, some states began to criminalize the distribution of even non-obscene so-called "child pornography," or "images of abuse," which arguably is not protected by the First Amendment. New York State, home of the publisher, St. Martin's Press, criminalized the distribution of non-obscene "child pornography" in 1977, but the publisher promptly went to court and obtained an injunction against the State. The court granted the injunction because the First Amendment was interpreted to permit the banning of only obscene material.

In 1982, the U.S. Supreme Court issued a decision, New York v. Ferber, which allowed the government to constitutionally ban the knowing distribution of even non-obscene "child pornography". Citing a chilling effect, St. Martin's Press then pulled the book, stating that though they believed Show Me! was not pornographic, they could no longer afford the legal expenses to defend it, and they did not want to risk criminal prosecutions of their own personnel and/or vendors who sold the book. The Court overruled a decision of the New York Court of Appeals, The People v. Paul Ira Ferber, which held that the First Amendment protected the dissemination of non-obscene sexual depictions. Show Me! was not the direct subject of the Ferber case, but the book was prominently featured by both sides in the litigation, and it played a significant role in the oral argument before the U.S. Supreme Court.

In its country of origin, Germany, the book first won several awards, even from church organisations, but due to rising pressure from a newly arising "moral majority" the publishers and McBride decided to take it off the market in 1996. By then over one million copies in seven languages had been sold. It was never officially banned in Germany. Public libraries there keep it on hand and out of print copies are openly sold at collectors' premium prices.

In New Zealand the book was banned by the Indecent Publications Tribunal in 1976. The ban was upheld in 1996.

== Critical reception ==
Show Me! received mixed reviews from the mass media when it was first published. The Los Angeles Times called the photographs "beautiful...graceful, charming, and elegant," yet accurately predicted, in a severe understatement of what actually happened, that the book "may start (an) uproar." The Washington Post, on the other hand, described the photographs as "beautiful, assaultive, grotesque, and seductive," and concluded that Show Me! was only suited for "avant garde" parents. Reviewer Linda Wolfe was more hostile in the New York Times, calling the book a "child-abusive joke". The 13-year-old daughter of Chicago Tribune reviewer Carol Kleiman stated: "I'm too old for it myself. The last part, though, with no pictures, looks interesting to read. The book is good for little kids because they don't know what society terms 'dirty' yet. You know, Mom, it's PARENTS I'm worried about. They're not ready yet."

=== Recent reviews ===
A 2005 Amazon review by Dr. Russell A. Rohde claims that the book, "appropriately delves into the issues of breast feeding, adolescence, pubertal changes, menses, sexual anatomies, pregnancy, masturbation, contraception, sexual behavioral disturbances and venereal disease. [...] I am not aware of any book comparable to this illustrated primer that fills the needs of sexual education so well."

D. F. Janssen places it at the one extreme of a late 20th-century visual and textual revolution that enabled parents to illustrate information that up to that time had been transmitted orally. He sees the work as subversive not for its "too frank" portrayal of childhood sexuality, but instead for the primacy that the image takes over the text. In his eyes, the work "comes out of a culture with a long history of pathologising so-addressed 'primal scenes,'" a history that became manifest in particular with regard to the works of Will McBride.

The book is analyzed in an article on "Picturing Sex Education" (Discourse Volume 27, Number 4 / December 2006).

In 2016, Pennsylvania State University PhD. Brett L. Lunceford, an independent researcher in the field of Rhetoric, Sexuality and Gender, wrote an article "Mommy and Daddy Were Married, and Other Creation Myths in Children’s Books About Sex", published in The Rhetorical Power of Children's Literature, with a review of few children's books about sex. Among them, Peter Mayle's Where Did I Come From? compared versus Will McBride's Show Me!, highlighting issues and good sides of each book in textual part and in visual illustration. Lunceford resumed his article stating that "the children's books that children read help to shape the world in which they eventually live."

== See also ==
- Where Did I Come From?

== Bibliographic details ==
1. 1974: Zeig mal. Ein Bilderbuch für Kinder und Eltern Foreword by Helmut Kentler. Wuppertal: Jugenddienst.
2. 1975: Show Me!: A Picture Book of Sex for Children and Parents St. Martin's Press. ISBN 0-312-72275-3
3. 1975: Laat 's zien!: een fotoboek over sex voor kinderen en ouders Amsterdam: Kosmos. ISBN 90-215-0528-2
4. 1978: Fais voir ! Un livre illustré sur la sexualité Montreal: Quinze. ISBN 0-88565-171-5
5. 1979: Fammi Vedere! un libro fotografico di educazione sessuale non conformista per bambini e grandi Perugia: Savelli
6. 1979: ¡A ver!: un libro de imágenes para niños y padres Salamanca: Lóguez Ediciones. ISBN 84-85334-06-X
7. 1981: Få se: seksualopplysning i tekst og bilder for barn og foreldre Oslo: Aschehoug i samarbeid med Hverdag. ISBN 82-03-10463-0
8. 1990: Zeig mal. Ein Bilderbuch für Kinder und Eltern (2nd. ed.) 195 p. Wuppertal: Hammer. ISBN 3-87294-301-4
9. 1990: Ukaž mi to! : Mezinárodní osvětová obrázková kniha pro děti a rodiče s informací o AIDS, translated by Jiří Kostelecký, Czech introduction by Jiří Raboch, 1st. ed., 199 p., Praha : Kredit; Wuppertal : Peter Hammer, 1990, ISBN 80-85279-05-3, 20.000 copies
10. 1995: Zeig Mal Mehr (5 ed.). 176 p. Beltz. ISBN 3-407-85106-5
