= Die Tagespost =

German weekly newspaper

- Type: Weekly newspaper
- Format: Nordisch
- Owner: Johann Wilhelm Naumann Foundation
- Publisher: Günter Putz
- Editor: Oliver Maksan
- Founded: 28 August 1948; 78 years ago
- Political alignment: Right-wing Catholic
- Language: German
- Headquarters: Würzburg, Germany
- Circulation: 10,250
- ISSN: 1615-8415
- Website: www.die-tagespost.de

Die Tagespost is a Catholic national weekly published by Johann Wilhelm Naumann Verlag in Würzburg, Germany. It bears the subtitle Katholische Wochenzeitung for politics, society and culture. Until 1 April 1999, it was called Deutsche Tagespost. The paper appeared three times a week, the Saturday edition with slight changes and an addition to the weekly Allgemeine Sonntagszeitung. Since January 2018, Die Tagespost has been published exclusively as a 32-page weekly newspaper and a paid online edition. According to journalists, it is a "right-wing Catholic" newspaper.

== History ==
With its first edition on August 28, 1948, the newspaper appeared under the name Augsburger Tagespost. It was the first denominational newspaper in the American zone of occupation. The founder, Johann Wilhelm Naumann, had previously given up his license share in the newspaper Schwäbische Landeszeitung. The Augsburger Tagespost was discontinued at the end of 1949. In 1951 the publishing house moved from Augsburg to Regensburg, where the newspaper appeared from then on as the Deutsche Tagespost and saw itself as a national Catholic newspaper for the German language region. Since 1955, Würzburg has been the headquarters of the publishing house and the place where the newspaper appears.

Until 1993, the publishing house Johann Wilhelm Naumann Verlag, was owned by the family of the founding publisher. In 1993 the publishing house was bought by the Catholic Echter Group. With the takeover of the shares from Echter, the Johann Wilhelm Naumann Foundation has been the sole owner of the newspaper since November 2017.

After the fundraising campaign Rettet die Tagespost (Save Die Tagespost) had ensured that it would continue to appear, the newspaper has been published since 4 January 2018 in a different category as a weekly newspaper on Thursdays and also with a daily updated online editorial department. At that time the newspaper appeared with around 9,500 copies according to its own information.

== Content and editorial focus ==
Die Tagespost reports on, among other things, papal instructional letters and pronouncements and regularly informs its readers about statements by the Vatican and other church bodies on current internal church and political issues. The paper is conservative in church politics; and is recognised as "right-wing Catholic" or classed as a newspaper "with right-wing tendencies". Important employees are assigned to Opus Dei, with which the newspaper is said to have been associated for decades. The owner's foundation is chaired by Norbert Neuhaus (CDU), a former head of the economic department and deputy mayor of Trier, who is also a member of Opus Dei and who was general secretary of the church aid organization Kirche in Not International (Church in Danger International) from 2004 to 2006. He is also co-editor of the Vatican Magazine.

== Controversies ==
The president of the Central Committee of German Catholics, Thomas Sternberg, warned in December 2019 of right-wing national influences on parishes and church councils and in this context also criticized the Die Tagespost as an example of "some strongly acting church media", against which the editor-in-chief of Die Tagespost, Oliver Maksan, said: The ZdK president is apparently trying to silence critical voices about the "Synodal Way". In August 2020, Peter Seewald, biographer of Pope Emeritus Benedict XVI, criticized the Die Tagespost for what he saw as a "tendentious and reputation-damaging" contribution. It was about an article that discussed Benedict's illness. Seewald saw himself personally attacked in the article.

== Publishers (selection) ==
- Johann Wilhelm Naumann (publisher and editor-in-chief from 1948 to 1956)
- Heinrich Wilhelm Naumann (medical doctor, professor, editor from 1973 to 2001 (†))
- Theodor Herr (editor from 1988 to 2000)
- Günter Putz (cathedral chapter in the diocese of Würzburg, editor since 2000)

== Editors-in-chief ==
- Ferdinand Römer (from 1955 to 1998)
- Guido Horst (from 1998 to 2006)
- Markus Reder (from 2006 to 2016)
- Oliver Maksan (since 1 July 2016)
