= Daniel Gottfried Schreber =

German cameralist, jurist and natural sciences scholar

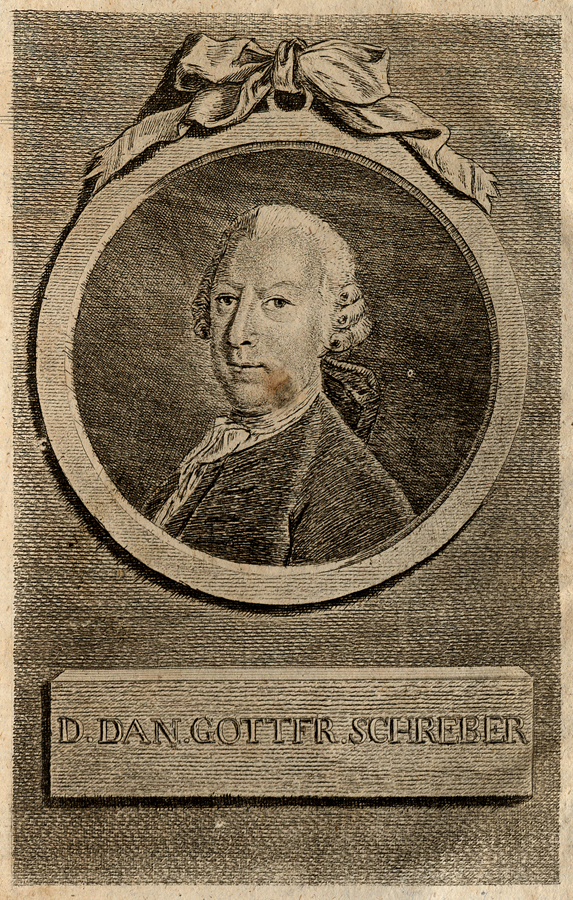

Daniel Gottfried Schreber (14 June 1708 – 29 March 1777) was a German cameralist, jurist and natural sciences scholar.

Schreber was born in Schulpforte, Naumburg and studied law at Leipzig before becoming a cameral science lecturer at the University of Halle in 1747. He received an honorary doctorate in law from the University of Erlangen. In 1760 he became a professor of philosophy and cameral science at the University of Bützow. In 1764 he became a professor of economics and cameral sciences at the University of Leipzig. He served as a commissioner in the House of Saxony-Weißenfels from 1732. He was an admirer of the Swedish economy and translated a work by Anders Berch. Schreber's son Johann Christian Daniel von Schreber became a naturalist who studied with Schreber's friend Carl Linnaeus. Another son was the physician Johann Gotthilf Daniel Schreber who was the grandfather of Daniel Paul Schreber who became famous for his first hand account of schizophrenia which was examined by Sigmund Freud and others.
