= Right-to-life movement =

The right-to-life movement or pro-life movement opposes abortion, assisted suicide, and euthanasia on moral grounds. It is closely related to the anti-abortion movement and anti-euthanasia movement. The difference is that while the anti-abortion focuses on abortion and anti-euthanasia movement focuses on euthanasia and assisted suicide, the right-to-life movement covers all three issues. The terms "right to life" and "pro-life" are generally associated more with opposition to abortion than to assisted suicide and euthanasia, and many right-to-life organizations primarily focus on abortion, but most organizations oppose all three. The consistent life ethic, held by some in the right-to-life movement, opposes not only abortion, assisted suicide, and euthanasia, but also capital punishment and war.

In the United States, the National Right to Life Committee is the largest right-to-life organization.

The right-to-life movement is often associated with Christianity (especially Catholicism) and the Republican Party, but groups such as Secular Pro-Life and Democrats for Life of America hold anti-abortion and anti-euthanasia views for other reasons.
