= Aktion Mensch =

German social organisation

- Aktion Mensch e.V.
- Formation: October 1964; 62 years ago
- Founder: Hans Mohl
- Type: Charitable non-governmental organisation
- Headquarters: Mainz
- Location: Bonn (service centre)
- Key people: Armin v. Buttlar (chairman); Dr. Thomas Bellut (chairman of the supervisory board)
- Revenue: €133 million (2014)
- Website: Official website
- Formerly called: Aktion Sorgenkind (until March 2000)

The Aktion Mensch ("Mensch" means "human") registered association (formerly known until February 2000 as "Aktion Sorgenkind"; Sorgenkind can be translated as "children in need") is a German social organisation which was formed on the initiative of the ZDF, a German television channel, in 1964 and is financed from the Lottery. The organisation supports inclusion, which may be defined as equality for all in the community.

The headquarters of the charitable organisation is in Mainz; the service centre is in Bonn. The registered association has seven members. In addition to the ZDF, the following six welfare organisations are also included: Arbeiterwohlfahrt (Workers' Welfare Association (AWO)), Deutscher Caritasverband, German Red Cross, Diaconal Charity of the German Evangelical Church, Deutscher Paritätischer Wohlfahrtsverband (German Parity Welfare Organisation) and the Zentralwohlfahrtsstelle der Juden in Deutschland (German Central Jewish Welfare Office).

4.6 million people regularly participate in the lottery run by "Aktion Mensch", which supports up to 1000 projects for people with disabilities, children and adolescents every month. It is the largest lottery in Germany. Since the foundation of the association, it has contributed over 3.9 billion euros to various projects (status as of 2017).

== History ==
Hans Mohl (1928-1998), a ZDF journalist and long-time presenter of the ZDF show Gesundheitsmagazin Praxis (first aired on 3 January 1964), founded the charitable organisation after the Thalidomide scandal had inspired him to host a relief action. The sleeping pill, marketed under the trade name of Contragan in West Germany, had caused fetuses to develop birth defects. Subsequent public pressure resulted in Contergan being withdrawn from the market in 1961. From 1957 on, a total of 5000 Contergan children were born in West Germany. Extensive coverage in news media resulted in great public interest which permanently removed the taboo surrounding the issue of disability. Thus, disability was no longer considered merely a private or individual fate, but also a challenge for the whole community. The lottery was initiated by Mohl in order to improve the quality of life for disabled children. ZDF supports this endeavour by regularly broadcasting TV shows promoting the association and conducting the lottery. The revenue helps finance projects and is augmented by charitable donations. The TV show Vergißmeinnicht ("forget-me-not"; hosted by Peter Frankenfeld) ran from 1964 to 1970, followed by the two successor formats Drei mal Neun ("three times nine"; from 1970 to 1974) and Der Große Preis ("Grand Prix"; from 1974 to 1993, both hosted by Wim Thoelke). All shows were a success during this period. But when Der Große Preis failed to arouse public interest with new hosts after Thoelke's departure in late 1992 the show was ultimately cancelled at the end of 1993. Follow-up formats such as Goldmillion (1995), Das Große Los ("The Jackpot"; from 1996 to 2000), Jede Sekunde zählt ("every second counts"; from 2000 to 2001) and once again Der Große Preis (from 2002 to mid-2003) also failed to repeat the success of previous years and were removed from the broadcast schedule before long. Thomas Gottschalk became involved with Aktion Mensch in October 2003. From January 2012, acting as the new volunteer “ambassador”, Jörg Pilawa announced the lottery winners on ZDF until Rudi Cerne took over in January 2014.

The association's perspective on disability changed drastically during its Respect-Campaign in 1995: People with a disability were no longer presented as pitiful beneficiaries of charity, but became confident individuals willing to represent their campaign. The main objective was to kick-start a shift in community awareness regarding disability. For this reason, the association's statutes were expanded to include “clarification” among its most important goals in 1997. Everyone agreed that supporting projects wasn't enough to raise public awareness of the issue of disability and to trigger general re-evaluation. New campaigns as well as accessible information and a comprehensive message were necessary to gain public attention and reach a larger target audience. The primary purpose was to bridge the gap between their beneficiaries and the audience to strengthen not just tolerance, but the feeling of community.

In 1999, the annual general meeting decided to rename the association “Aktion Mensch”, taking effect on 1 March 2000. This new name was intended to symbolise not only the expanded range of tasks, but also the change in public perspective when dealing with disabled people. On 1 January 2003, the association launched its newly prioritised welfare service for children and teenagers, supporting more than 120 projects with roughly 12 million euros in its initial year. This was planned as a long-term commitment, as young people face increasing difficulties when trying to organise their own lives, whether they are handicapped or not. Furthermore, children's and young people's welfare service providers don't have the necessary means to offer adequate programs. In 2014, Aktion Mensch celebrated its 50th anniversary with the slogan “Much achieved, but more to come”, hosting numerous events.

== Awareness Raising ==
The association raises public awareness for inclusion. They inform the public and encourage people to reflect on the issues and motivate them to participate. The overall aim of the educational work is to get people enthusiastic about a society in which differences are normal.

=== Campaigns and Actions ===
==== The Inclusion Campaign ====
In the summer of 2011, Aktion Mensch started its nationwide Inclusion Campaign to sensitise people to the equal participation of people with disabilities in society and to promote inclusion. The guiding principle of the 2011 campaign was to drive forward a shift of consciousness in society and to show by means of positive examples how inclusion can work. The motives of the 2012 Inclusion Campaign promoted equal participation of people with disabilities at work, in schools and during their leisure time. The third phase of the awareness campaign on the subject of inclusion took place under the title "Inclusion needs questions!". In the anniversary campaign of 2014 the people involved showed how they overcame barriers to reach their goals on their own. In 2015, the campaign's main goal was bringing together people with and without disabilities. The film "Das erste Mal" ("The First Time") shows such encounters and the emotional impact they have.

==== 5 May ====
In 1997, the funding organization initiated the largest social campaign in Germany, the "Aktion Grundgesetz" ("Action Basic Law"). The association and more than 100 charities and self-help organizations argued about the implementation of Article 3 (3) s.3 GG: No person shall be disfavoured because of disability." Since 1998, after the campaign "Aktion Grundgesetz", this particular day has become a European day of protest demonstrating for equality for people with disabilities. Aktion Mensch annually hosts decentralised events and initiatives nationwide.

== Support ==
The association supports projects initiated by recognised independent social sponsors but not by individuals or public institutions. The board of trustees decides on the motions submitted on the basis of the funding guidelines of Aktion Mensch, which are published on the association's website. When selecting grant applications, the committee takes into careful consideration that only concepts are chosen which take an innovative approach and also contribute to the practice of inclusion in everyday life. During this process, applications regarding disability welfare, but also children and youth aid are taken into account. The association provides the means for a variety of needs by supporting, for example, integration companies and barrier-free buildings, by transforming big establishments into community-integrated, smaller residential units, by providing more mobility and subsidisation of vehicles, by supporting staff and material costs as well as projects advocating inclusion in leisure and education. Aktion Mensch thereby not only enables complex projects but shows its strength by supporting primarily smaller projects or initiatives.

== Lottery ==
With almost 36% of its lottery earnings the organization supports social projects to help the disabled and young people, along with the awareness-raising measures. 30% is distributed as lottery winnings, 16.7% is paid for income tax, 7.4% is used to cover business expenses, 10.1% is used for marketing and communication (status as of 2014). All donations are used for aid. In 2014, the social lottery distributed about 133 million euros worth of profits to lottery participants. Every Sunday at 7.28 p.m., Rudi Cerne, the honorary ambassador, announces the winning numbers in the ZDF show "Aktion Mensch Gewinner" ("Aktion Mensch Winners"). He also presents a variety of projects supported by the lottery. Before 1 March 2015 the show was called "5 Sterne Gewinner" ("5 Star Winners"). Participants can purchase a variety of lottery tickets. Subscription lottery tickets include the "Lucky Lottery", the "5 Stars" and the "Xtra Super Lottery", whereas the "Monthly Lottery" offers the possibility of winning 12 times a year from 500,000 up to 2 million euros. The maximum jackpot of the "5 Stars" is 2 million euros. Further profit opportunities are "Immediate Annuity", "Housekeeping Money" or the "Dream House". The "Lucky Lottery" offers instant winnings of up to 2 million euros, or a combination win of up to 1 million euros plus up to 5,000 euros handed out every month, or a monthly fund of up to 10,000 euros.

=== Familienratgeber - Family Adviser ===
The association offers a regularly updated network of more than 160 partners in care services for disabled people and their relatives, unique in Germany, on its website Familienratgeber.de. It covers a wide range of topics that are of importance for people with disabilities who desire to participate independently and self-reliantly in their community. Local contacts can be looked up in a central address data base comprising over 25,000 addresses nationally. In addition, users have the possibility to share their experiences in various forums.

=== Data Base of Volunteers ===
The association's data base of volunteers is the largest and most comprehensive accumulation of voluntary and unpaid charity work, offering more than 10,000 services. This platform gives welfare organizations the opportunity to not only introduce their members to the people in need of help, but also to explain the reasons for their dedication. Local associates and network partners ensure that the services offered nationwide are of the highest quality and that the data used is revised on a regular basis, guaranteeing a list of providers which is always up-to-date.

=== People – The Magazine/Show ===
Since 2004 the association has been publishing the periodical "People – The Magazine" every three months. It includes reports, features, biographies and interviews pertaining to issues of inclusion, disability care and self-care, children's aid and welfare service for teenagers. Enhanced online content offering additional information, photos and videos was introduced with the first issue of 2014. Most online articles are made available in plain language and for every article there is an audio version. A ZDF show of the same name first aired in 2003, promoting the ideas and problems outlined in the journal, succeeding previous formats such as The Great Aid (from 1976 to 1995) and Partake (from 1994 to 2002), and was hosted by Stephan Greulich and Bettina Eistel, who left in 2007 and 2014 respectively. As of 6 September 2014 the show has been hosted by Sandra Olbrich and broadcast on Saturdays at 5.45 p.m.

=== Further Services ===
The online education service is a research pool of the association's collection of materials pertaining to education: A search form guides users to free work materials and general information on various topics, all of which can also be downloaded.
