= Daniel Paul Schreber =

German judge (1842 – 1911)

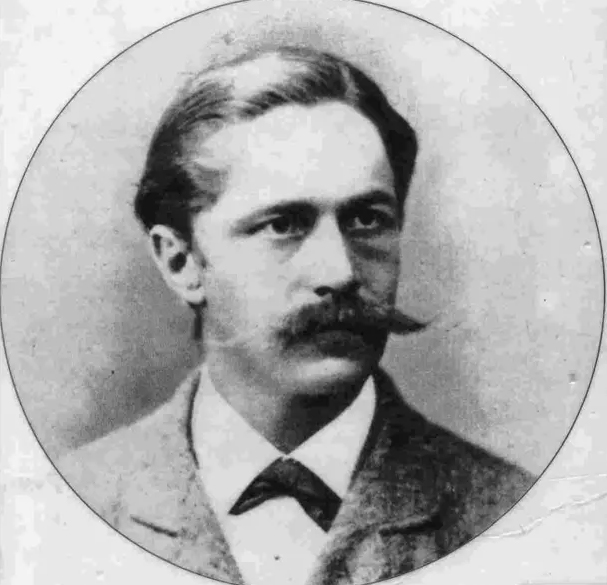
- Born: 25 July 1842; Leipzig, Kingdom of Saxony
- Died: 14 April 1911 (aged 68); Leipzig, Kingdom of Saxony
- Education: St. Thomas School, Leipzig; University of Leipzig
- Occupation: Judge
- Notable work: Memoirs of My Nervous Illness
- Father: Moritz Schreber

Daniel Paul Schreber (German: [ˈʃʀeːbɐ]; 25 July 1842 – 14 April 1911) was a German judge who was famous for his personal account of his own experience with schizophrenia. Schreber experienced three distinct periods of acute mental illness. The first of these, in 1884 to 1885, was what was then diagnosed as dementia praecox (later known as paranoid schizophrenia or schizophrenia, paranoid type). He described his second mental illness, from 1893 to 1902, making also a brief reference to the first disorder from 1884 to 1885, in his book Memoirs of My Nervous Illness (German: Denkwürdigkeiten eines Nervenkranken). The Memoirs became an influential book in the history of psychiatry and psychoanalysis because of its interpretation by Sigmund Freud. There is no personal account of his third disorder, in 1907–1911; however, some details about it can be found in the Hospital Chart (in the Appendix to Lothane's book). During his second illness he was treated by Paul Flechsig (Leipzig University Clinic), Reginald H. Pierson (Lindenhof), and, from 29 June 1894 to 20 December 1902, Guido Weber (Royal Public Asylum, Sonnenstein).

== Early life, education, and career ==
Schreber was born on 25 July 1842 in Leipzig, Germany, the second oldest of five children of physician Daniel Gottlieb Moritz Schreber (1808–1861) and Louise Henrietta Pauline Haase (1815–1907). His paternal great-grandfather was Daniel Gottfried Schreber. Throughout his life, his family suffered from various mental illnesses; his father experienced lifelong depression and his older brother committed suicide in 1877.

Schreber graduated from St. Thomas School in 1860, began work as a judge for the Ministry of Justice in 1867, and received a doctorate in jurisprudence from Leipzig University in 1869. He married Ottilie Sabine Behr (1857–1912) in 1878.

== Schizophrenia ==
=== Timeline ===
In 1884, Schreber ran for Reichstag and lost. This had a negative effect on his mental health, causing him to enter an asylum for six months. He was treated by psychiatrist Paul Flechsig and left "completely recovered", returning to work in 1886. In October 1893, Schreber became presiding judge of an Oberlandesgericht court and his wife had a stillbirth. He shortly readmitted himself to Fleschsig's clinic seeking treatment for insomnia. Starting from November 9, the persistence of insomnia became so unbearable that it drove him to the brink of suicide. His condition worsened in the following years and he was eventually transferred to Sonnenstein Castle. By 1899 he entered remission and was deemed "capable of meeting the demands of everyday life", though still confident in his schizophrenic delusions. He wrote his memoir a year later. Schreber took legal action to be released and won in 1902, but was re-institutionalised in 1907 after his mother died and his wife had a stroke. Schreber died on 14 April 1911 in the Leipzig-Dosen asylum.

=== Experiences ===
Schreber woke up one morning with the thought that "it really must be rather pleasant to be a woman succumbing to intercourse". He was alarmed and felt that this thought had come from somewhere else, not from himself. He even hypothesized that the thought had come from a doctor who had experimented with hypnosis on him; he thought that the doctor had telepathically invaded his mind. He believed his primary psychiatrist, Paul Flechsig, had contact with him using a "nerve-language" of which Schreber said humans are unaware. He believed that hundreds of people's souls took special interest in him, and contacted his nerves by using "divine rays", telling him special information, or requesting things of him. During one of his stays at the Sonnenstein asylum, he concluded that there are "fleeting-improvised-men" in the world, which he believed were divinely fabricated men, as miracles to provide Schreber with "play-with-humans" in light of a depopulation of the world.

As his psychosis progressed, he believed that God was turning him into a woman, sending rays down to enact 'miracles' upon him, including little men to torture him. Schreber was released from psychiatric hospitals around 1902, shortly before the publication of his book.

=== Worldview ===
The fundamental unit of Schreber's ruminations were what he called "nerves", which were said to compose both the human soul and the nature of God in relation to humanity. Each human soul was composed of nerves that derived from God, whose own nerves were then the ultimate source of human existence. Schreber's thought that God's nerves and those of humanity existed parallel to one another except when the "Order of the World" was violated which constituted the fundamental premise of Schreber's memoirs, in which the two universes experienced dangerous "nerve-contact" with each other. For Schreber, this was focused upon his personal and institutional relationship with Flechsig, who became a rebellious "nerve specialist" by virtue of his psychiatric power in contrast to the "Omnipotence" of God.

The peculiar universe of Schreber's was mediated by the activity of rays, which could assume a "pure" and "impure" relation; these rays could be controlled by Flechsig or emanated strictly from God, who sought to influence Schreber and his reality by "divine miracles". The rays had the capacity for independent activity, though they were distinguished from souls and nerves (generally identical) which emanated from other human beings deceased or living. Within Schreber's cosmology the universe as an observable reality, and the Sun especially, was a partially independent realm which God merely communicated through, using rays and miracles to influence at times when the "Order of the World" needed to be adjusted. Strictly speaking, God only initiated nerve-contact with human beings through dreams or inspired states (in poetry, etc.), or when humans had become corpses and returned to the "forecourts of Heaven" after purification to rejoin the 'nerve soul' of God. However, the entire crisis which Schreber describes in his book is the dangerous combination between humanity and God within the mind of Schreber.

Schreber's ruminations can be schematized in this way:

- The "forecourts of Heaven" - The "states of Blessedness" where deceased humans' souls reside after a process of "purification". These are called the "anterior realms of God" in contraposition to the "posterior" realms which consist of the Upper (Ormuzd) and Lower (Ariman) gods (clearly derived from ancient Iranian religion). The inferior god is especially attracted by the people of the "brown race" (the Semites), while the superior god by the people of the "blond race" (the Aryans). Such gods are endowed with their own instinct of self-preservation.
- The Universe - Separated from the transcendental sphere of God providing the human/material world and yet threatening God's invested existence within it; celestial bodies allow the means for God's life/light to interact with His creations.
- Divine rays - Semi-sentient entities (which are the cosmic fuel of God's Omnipotence, and influence Schreber and the world but can be manipulated by Flechsig).
- Nerves/Souls - The spiritual bodies of humans which are active whether the living person is alive or dead, and go through various states of purification in order to return to God's nerves in a "state of Blessedness".

There is no Hell in Schreber's cosmology.

== Interpretations ==
=== Freud ===
Although Sigmund Freud never interviewed Schreber himself, he read his Memoirs and drew his own conclusions from it in an essay entitled "Psycho-Analytic Notes on an Autobiographical Account of a Case of Paranoia (Dementia Paranoides)" (1911). Freud thought that Schreber's disturbances resulted from repressed homosexual desires, which in infancy were oriented at his father and brother. Repressed inner drives were projected onto the outside world and led to intense hallucinations which were first centred on his physician Flechsig (projection of his feelings towards his brother), and then around God (who represented Schreber's father, Daniel Gottlob Moritz Schreber). During the first phase of his illness Schreber was certain that Flechsig persecuted him and made direct attempts to murder his soul and change him into a woman (he had what Freud thought to be emasculation hallucinations, which were in fact, according to Schreber's words an "unmanning" (Entmannung) experience). In the next period of his ailment he was convinced that God and the order of things demanded of him that he must be turned into a woman so that he could be the sole object of sexual desire of God. Schreber indicates November 1895 as the period in which the connection between the fantasy of "unmanning" and the idea of having been invested by God with the role of redeemer of corrupt humanity was established. Sex change is justified by Schreber as the necessary means that God used to allow him to create new men.

Consideration of the Schreber case led Freud to revise received classification of mental disturbances. He argued that the difference between paranoia and dementia praecox is not at all clear, since symptoms of both ailments may be combined in any proportion, as in Schreber's case. Therefore, Freud concluded, it may be necessary to introduce a new diagnostic notion: paranoid dementia, which does justice to polymorphous mental disturbances such as those exhibited by the judge.

==== Criticism ====
Freud's interpretation has been contested by a number of theorists, most notably Gilles Deleuze and Félix Guattari in their work Anti-Oedipus and elsewhere. Their reading of Schreber's Memoirs is a part of their wider criticism of familial orientation of psychoanalysis and it foregrounds the political and racial elements of the text; they see Schreber's written experience of reality abnormal only in its honesty about the experience of power in late capitalism.

Elias Canetti also devoted the eleventh chapter of his theoretical magnum opus Crowds and Power, and the essay Power and Survival to a reading of Schreber, claiming that Freud took into consideration only a small part of Schreber's text and that his interpretation was completely wrong. According to Canetti, Schreber's description of his own paranoia is "by far the most important document about the One... in the entire psychiatric literature." Schreber fantasized that he was the only man to have survived the plague and leprosy epidemics, thanks to "divine rays", and this, for Canetti, is "the extreme and final stage of power".

Finally, Jacques Lacan's Seminar on the Psychoses and one of his écrits "On a Question Prior to Any Possible Treatment of Psychosis" are predominantly concerned with reading and evaluating Schreber's text over and against Freud's original and originating interpretation.

According to Thomas Dalzell (2011, 2018), Freud's etiology for Schreber's paranoia has not been fully accepted by anglophone psychoanalysts, even those who claim to side with Freud and his interpretation of the Schreber case. However, Dalzell argues that the French psychoanalyst, Jacques Lacan, has accepted Freud's etiology more fully, in that he adheres not only to the Freudian association between castration and the father, although he relates them in a symbolic dialectic (the foreclosure of the signifier of the Name-of-the-Father) instead of Freud's imaginary one (the loss of the integrity of Schreber's body in his relationship with his father), but understands Schreber's psychotic world as his inability to move beyond the narcissism of what Lacan calls "the mirror stage". Where most anglophone commentators have concentrated on the homosexual component of Freud's etiology, Lacan sees it as only a symptom, preferring to stress Freud's positing a narcissism fixation as the cause. Hence Schreber's relationships with his imaginary "fleetingly improvised men," with his doctor, Flechsig, and even with God, reduced to a little other, and hence his behavior in front of the mirror, adorning himself with ribbons and feminine accessories, as well as Schreber's remarks about himself as a "leprous corpse leading another leprous corpse," the description of a reduction, as Lacan puts it, to the confrontation with "his psychical double".

=== Schatzman ===
In 1974, Morton Schatzman published Soul Murder, in which he gave his own interpretation of Schreber's psychosis. Schatzman's interpretation was based on W. G. Niederland's research from the 1950s. (Niederland had previously worked with survivors of Nazi concentration camps.) Schatzman had found child-rearing pamphlets written by Moritz Schreber, Daniel Paul Schreber's father, which stressed the necessity of taming the rebellious savage beast in the child and turning him into a productive citizen. Many of the techniques recommended by Moritz Schreber were mirrored in Daniel Schreber's psychotic experiences. For example, one of the "miracles" described by Daniel Schreber was that of chest compression, of tightening and tightening. This can be seen as analogous to one of Moritz Schreber's techniques of using an elaborate contraption that confined the child's body, forcing him to have a "correct" posture at the dinner table. Similarly, the "freezing miracle" might mirror Moritz Schreber's recommendation of placing the infant in a bath of ice cubes beginning at age three months. Daniel Paul Schreber's older brother, Daniel Gustav Schreber, committed suicide in his thirties. In his 1989 book Schreber: Father and Son, Han Israëls argued against the interpretations of Niederland and Schatzman, claiming that Schreber's father had been unfairly criticized in the literature. In a subsequent interview, Israëls said that the fact that Schreber's childhood events came back in his delirium "doesn't necessarily mean that they are the cause of the mental illness".

=== Lothane ===
Henry Zvi Lothane argued against the interpretations of Niederland and Schatzman in his 1992 book, In Defense of Schreber: Soul Murder and Psychiatry. Lothane's Schreber research included the study of archival records concerning the relationship between Schreber and the other significant people in his life, including his wife and his doctors. On Lothane's account, the existing literature on Schreber as a rule (1) leaves substantial gaps in the historical records, which careful archival research could in some measure fill, (2) leaves out psychoanalytically significant relationships, such as that between Schreber and his wife, and (3) overstates the purportedly sadistic elements in Schreber's father's child-rearing techniques. Lothane's interpretation of Schreber also differs from previous texts in that he considers Schreber a worthwhile thinker.

== In popular culture ==
- Schreber's Memoirs are the starting point and main topic of the 1972 radio play Schreber's Nervous Illness by British playwright Caryl Churchill.
- Roberto Calasso's first book, and only novel, L'impuro folle (1974), is about Schreber.
- Danish theatre company Livingstones Kabinet produced a music theatre piece in 2007 at Plex, Copenhagen entitled "Herr Schreber", based on the Memoirs
- A character of the same name appears in the 1988 book Empire of the Senseless by Kathy Acker.
- A character of the same name appears in the 1998 film Dark City, played by Kiefer Sutherland.
- In the 2006 film Memoirs of My Nervous Illness, based on Schreber's 1903 journal of the same name, Schreber is portrayed by Jefferson Mays.
- The 2011 docudrama film, Shock Head Soul follows Schreber's demise and later life.
- Schreber is the first person narrator of Swedish writer Fabian Kastner's novel Lekmannen (The Layman, 2013).
- In Jenny Davidson's The Magic Circle: A Novel (2013), Lucy uses Memoirs of My Nervous Illness as a text for the seminar she is teaching on "Madness and Literature."
- The song "Dementia Praecox" from the 2014 album White Deer Park by Papa vs Pretty is about Daniel Paul Schreber.
- Schreber is the subject of British writer Alex Pheby's novel Playthings, (2015).
- BBC documents record that Anthony Burgess wrote in 1975 for Burt Lancaster a screenplay of Schreber's Memoir. Never filmed, it was adapted for radio and performed by Christopher Eccleston 22 March 2020.
- The two dominant organizations in the anime franchise Neon Genesis Evangelion are named NERV and SEELE, German for Nerve and Soul, likely alluding to Schreber's cosmology.
