= Menno Aden (artist) =

German photographer and conceptual artist

- Born: 1972 (age 53–54); Weener, Lower Saxony, Germany
- Known for: Photography, conceptual art
- Movement: Contemporary photography
- Website: www.mennoaden.com

Menno Aden (born 1972) is a German photographer and conceptual artist based in Berlin. He is known for photographic works depicting interiors and architectural spaces from a bird's-eye perspective, particularly the long-running series Room Portraits.

== Life and work ==
Aden studied fine arts and composition at the University of Bremen before moving to Berlin.

His work focuses on architecture, domestic interiors, spatial systems, and surveillance culture. His best known series, Room Portraits, begun in 2006, consists of digitally assembled photographs taken from directly above interiors such as apartments, offices, elevators, and medical practices.

The resulting images resemble architectural models, floor plans, or surveillance imagery. Critics have connected the works to themes of voyeurism, abstraction, and the psychological dimensions of domestic space.

Later projects included works dealing with industrial production processes and AI-generated imagery.

== Reception ==
Aden's work has been discussed in international newspapers, magazines, and photography publications. Writing in The Guardian, Adrian Searle described Aden's photographs as "bird’s-eye views" of domestic interiors that transform personal living spaces into abstract spatial compositions. German newspaper Der Tagesspiegel published a full-page feature on Aden and his treatment of architectural and domestic environments. The German edition of Le Monde diplomatique featured Aden's work across an entire issue. His work has additionally been featured in publications including Dezeen, Popular Photography, IGNANT, and AnOther Magazine.

== Exhibitions ==
Aden's works have been exhibited internationally in museums, galleries, and photography festivals:

- Room Portraits, Wandsworth Museum, London (2013)
- Staatliche Kunsthalle Karlsruhe
- Landesmuseum Oldenburg in connection with the Ostfriesland Biennale (2025)
- Portraits – Hellerau Photography Award 2019
- Room Portraits, European Month of Photography, Berlin (2016)

== Publications ==
Aden's works have appeared in books and publications on photography, architecture, and visual culture.

His photography was included in Berlin – Raum Radar, published by Hatje Cantz Verlag.

His works were also featured in Photoviz, published by Gestalten Verlag, a publication focusing on photography, data visualization, and emerging visual technologies.

== Teaching ==
Aden taught photography courses at the Berlin University of the Arts during the 2017 summer semester.

In 2020, he led photography workshops at the Sommerakademie Dresden.

== Awards ==
- German Prize for Science Photography, First Prize
- International Photography Awards, Architecture category
