= Katharina Rutschky =

German educationalist and author

Katharina Rutschky (25 January 1941, Berlin – 14 January 2010, Berlin) was a German educationalist and author. She coined the term Schwarze Pädagogik (literally black pedagogy) in her eponymous book from 1977, describing physical and psychical violence as part of education (a notion elaborated upon some years later by Alice Miller). Until her death, Rutschky lived with her husband Michael Rutschky in Berlin.

== Publications ==
- Schwarze Pädagogik, originally published in 1977.
- Deutsche Kinder-Chronik: Wunsch- und Schreckensbilder aus vier Jahrhunderten, originally published in 1983.
- Deutsche Schul-Chronik: Lernen und Erziehen in vier Jahrhunderten, originally published in 1991.
- Erregte Aufklärung: Kindesmissbrauch: Fakten & Fiktionen, originally published in 1992.
- Handbuch sexueller Missbrauch, originally published in 1994.
- Emma and her Sisters, originally published in 1999.
- Der Stadthund: von Menschen an der Leine, originally published in 2001.

== See also ==
- Critical pedagogy
