= Menno Aden (politician) =

German academic, politician and translator

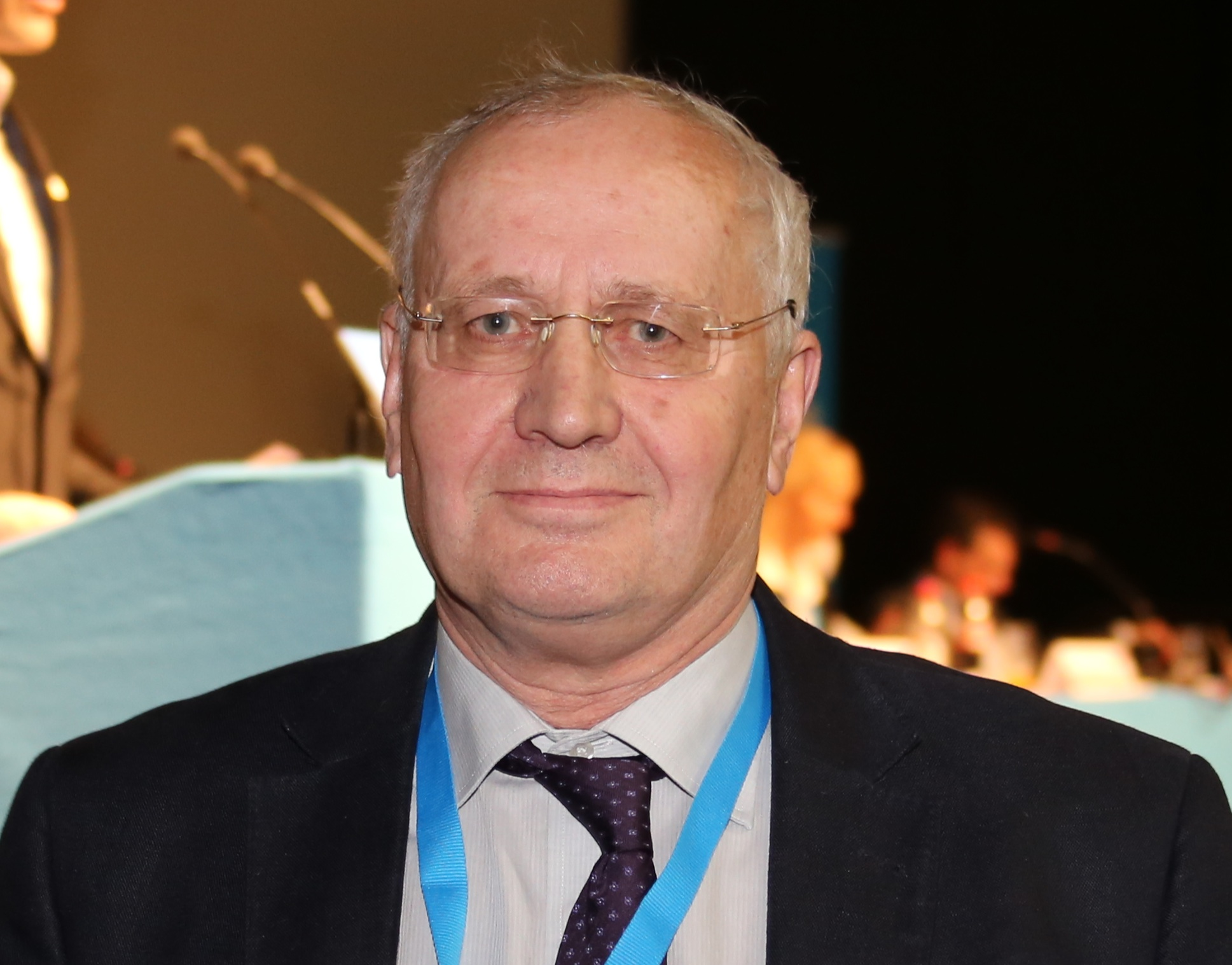
- Born: 18 November 1942 (age 83)
- Education: University of Bonn
- Occupations: Academic, Politician & Translator

Menno Aden (born 18 November 1942 in Berchtesgaden) is a German lawyer, former politician (Alternative for Germany, formerly Christian Democratic Union of Germany) and translator. He is the founder of the Neue Rechte (New Right) and has written speeches and pamphlets with historical revisionism content.

== Education and career ==
Aden studied law at the University of Bonn. He holds a Ph.D. in law. He then worked for Deutschen Bank AG and switched in 1981 to Ruhrgas AG in Essen. He was responsible for business contacts to the USSR. Up from 1987 he worked for Sparkasse Essen.

Aden taught at FOM University of Applied Sciences.

== Politics ==
Aden was a member of the Christian Democratic Union for 30 years. Aden resigned in protest over the then CDU-leader Angela Merkel and her policies. He became a member of the right-wing Alternative for Germany and was elected to the Essen City Council in 2014. He then left that party and served on the council as an independent until 2020.

== Author ==
In 2008 and 2009, Menno Aden regularly wrote commercial law articles for the weekly newspaper Junge Freiheit newspaper.

He gave regular lectures, for example on the subject of "German patriotism in today's Europe" at the Bürgerbewegung Pro Deutschland. In his work on international commercial arbitration, which was published in its second edition in 2003, Aden speaks of a "traditional German national weakness of ego" that easily leads "to a German lawyer being more likely to be mistaken for a self-confident American, especially if he is, as is often the case, of Jewish origin 'having the butter taken from the bread' than vice versa". Aden has been criticised for Holocaust revisionism several times.

Aden was President of the Evangelical Lutheran Church of Mecklenburg from 1994 to 1996. He has translated Richard Francis Burton's The Kasidah into German, as well as many poems by Alexander Pushkin, Michail Lermontow, Fjodor Tjutschew and other Russin poets.

Aden is also author of numerous legal works, such as Internationale Handelschiedsgerichtsbarkeit - Kommentar zu den Verfahrensordnungen 1988; 2002 (International Commercial Arbitration, Commentary to Arbitration Rules).

== Publications ==
=== Theology ===
- Apostolisches Glaubensbekenntnis: Grundlagen des christlichen Glaubens und Wort für Wort-Kommentar. Verlag Traugott Bautz, Nordhausen 2013, ISBN 978-3-88309-814-2.
- Christlicher Glaube: Darstellung der Grundlagen und Kommentar zum apostolischen Glaubensbekenntnis. Daedalus, Münster 2004, ISBN 3-89126-147-0.

=== Law ===
- Internationales Privates Wirtschaftsrecht. Oldenbourg, München 2005, ISBN 3-486-57892-8; 2. Auflage 2009, ISBN 978-3-486-58952-8.
- Internationale Handelsschiedsgerichtsbarkeit: Kommentar zu den Verfahrensordnungen. Beck, München 2003, ISBN 3-406-49178-2.

=== Politics ===
- Das Werden des Imperium Americanum und seine zwei hundertjährigen Kriege (2016) (The birth of the Imperium Americanum and its two hundred year wars)

=== Literature ===
- Puschkin: Russland und sein erster Dichter. Attempto, Tübingen 2000, ISBN 3-89308-324-3.
- Lermontow-Russlands unvollendeter Dichter. Verlag wbg-Academic 2020, ISBN 978-3-534-40447-6.
- Richard Francis Burton: Die Kasidah des Haji Abdu El-Yezdi. Übersetzt und erläutert von Menno Aden. Attempto, Tübingen 2007, ISBN 978-3-89308-401-2.
