= List of gay, lesbian or bisexual people: D–E =

This is a partial list of notable people who were or are gay men, lesbian or bisexual.

The historical concept and definition of sexual orientation varies and has changed greatly over time; for example the general term "gay" wasn't used to describe sexual orientation until the mid 20th century. A number of different classification schemes have been used to describe sexual orientation since the mid-19th century, and scholars have often defined the term "sexual orientation" in divergent ways. Indeed, several studies have found that much of the research about sexual orientation has failed to define the term at all, making it difficult to reconcile the results of different studies. However, most definitions include a psychological component (such as the direction of an individual's erotic desire) and/or a behavioural component (which focuses on the sex of the individual's sexual partner/s). Some prefer to simply follow an individual's self-definition or identity.

The high prevalence of people from the West on this list may be due to societal attitudes towards homosexuality. The Pew Research Center's 2013 Global Attitudes Survey found that there is “greater acceptance in more secular and affluent countries,” with "publics in 39 countries [having] broad acceptance of homosexuality in North America, the European Union, and much of Latin America, but equally widespread rejection in predominantly Muslim nations and in Africa, as well as in parts of Asia and in Russia. Opinion about the acceptability of homosexuality is divided in Israel, Poland and Bolivia.” As of 2013, Americans are divided – a majority (60 percent) believes homosexuality should be accepted, while 33 percent disagree.

== D ==
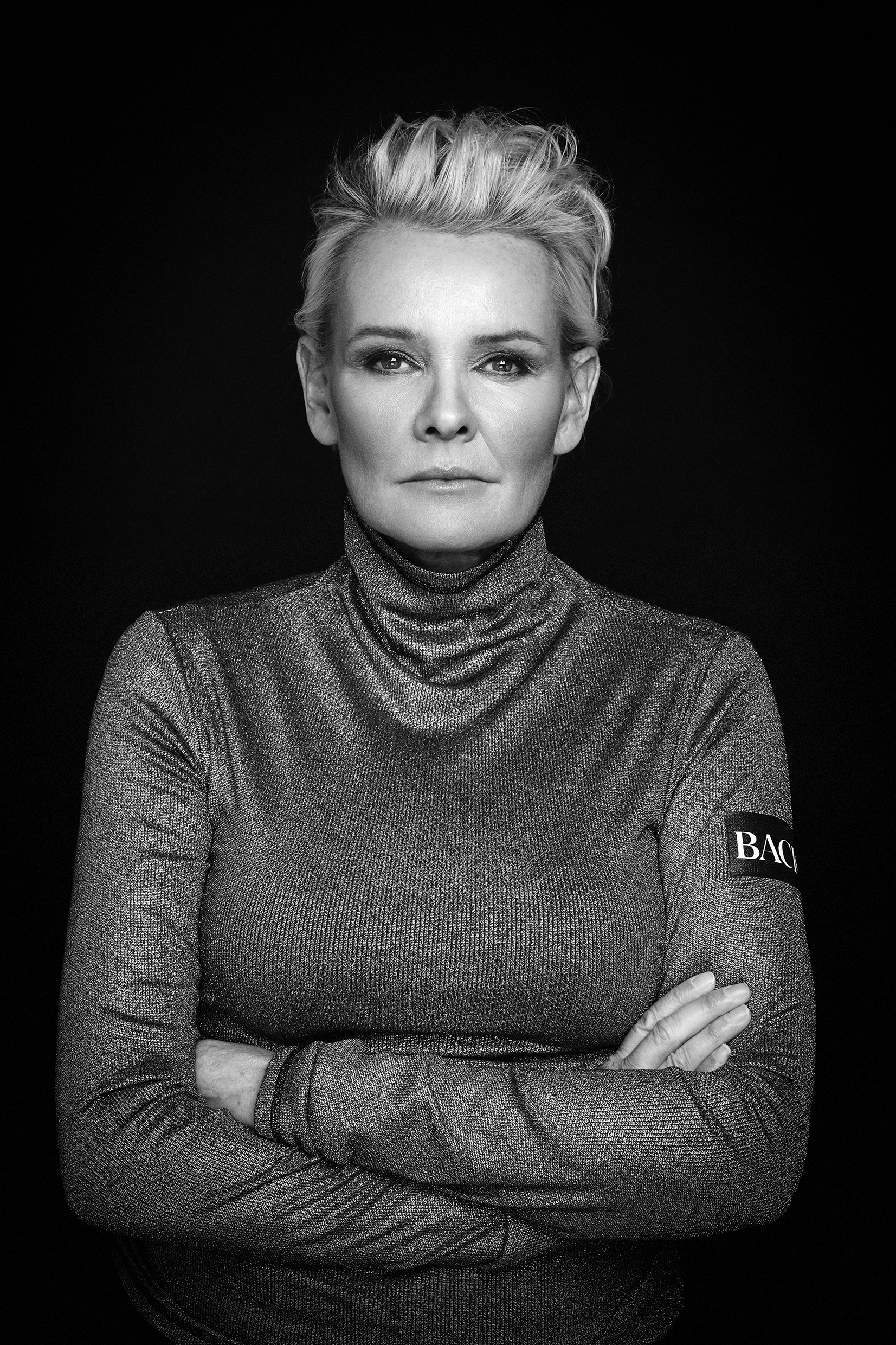
Pop singer Eva Dahlgren

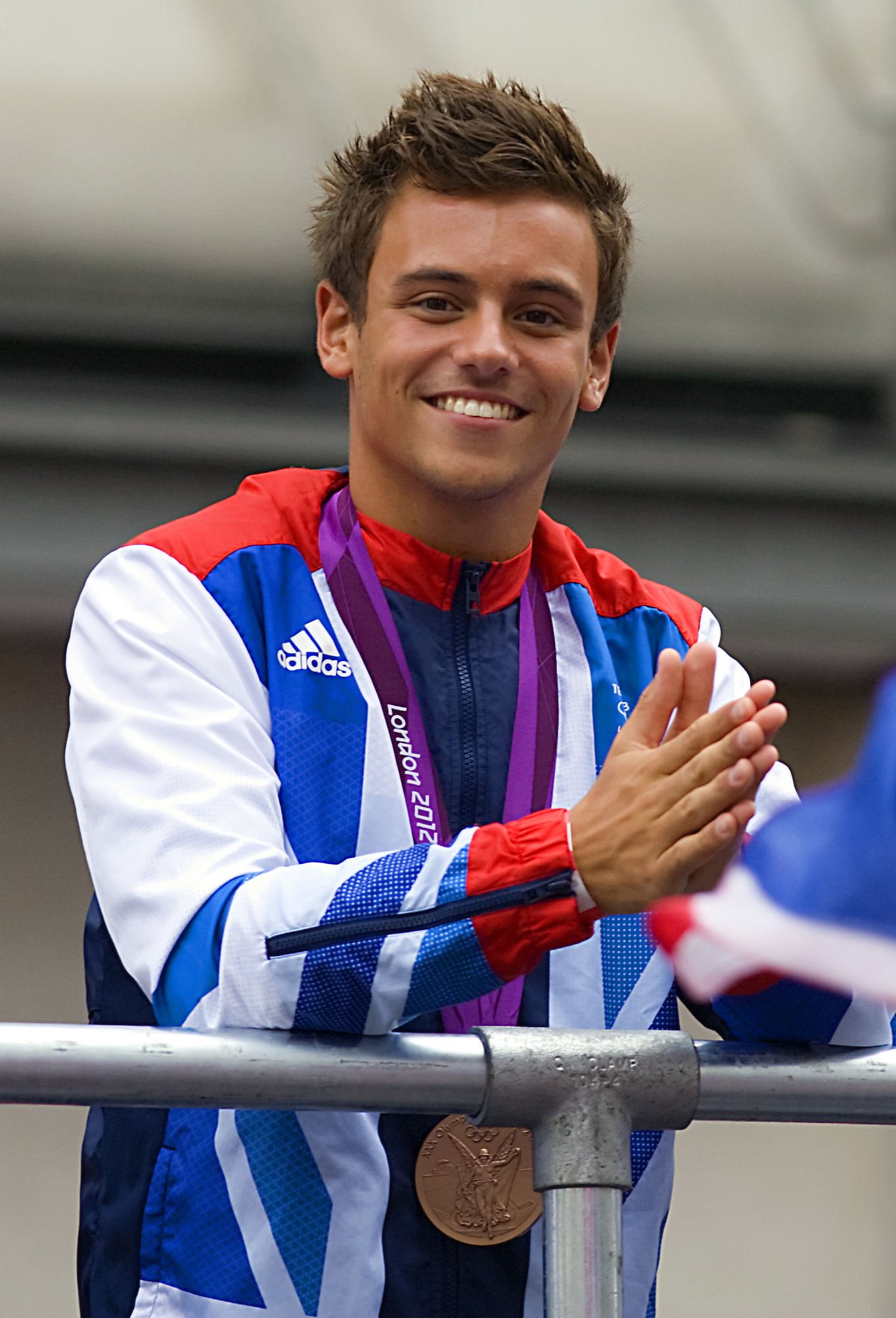
Diver Tom Daley

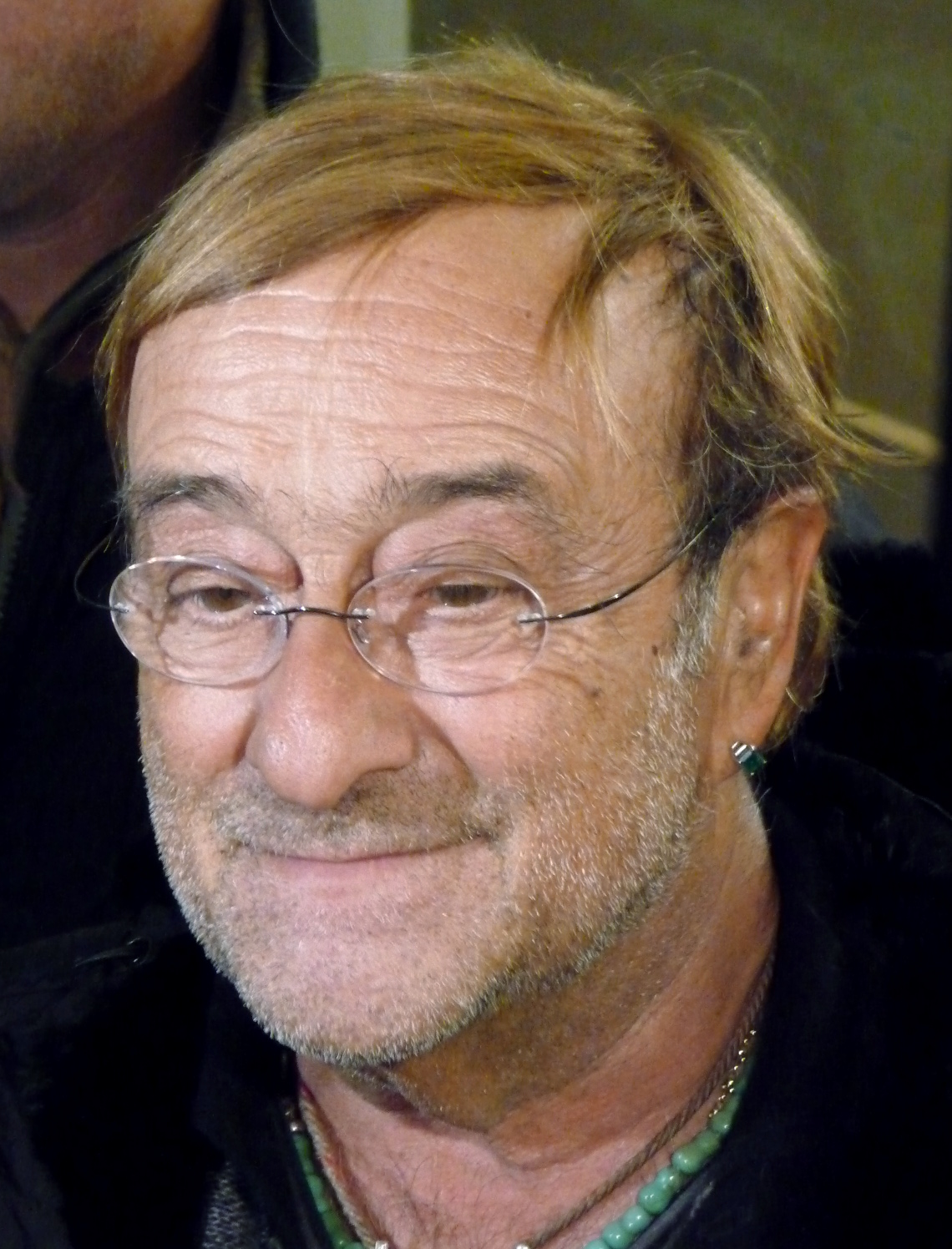
Singer-songwriter and musician Lucio Dalla

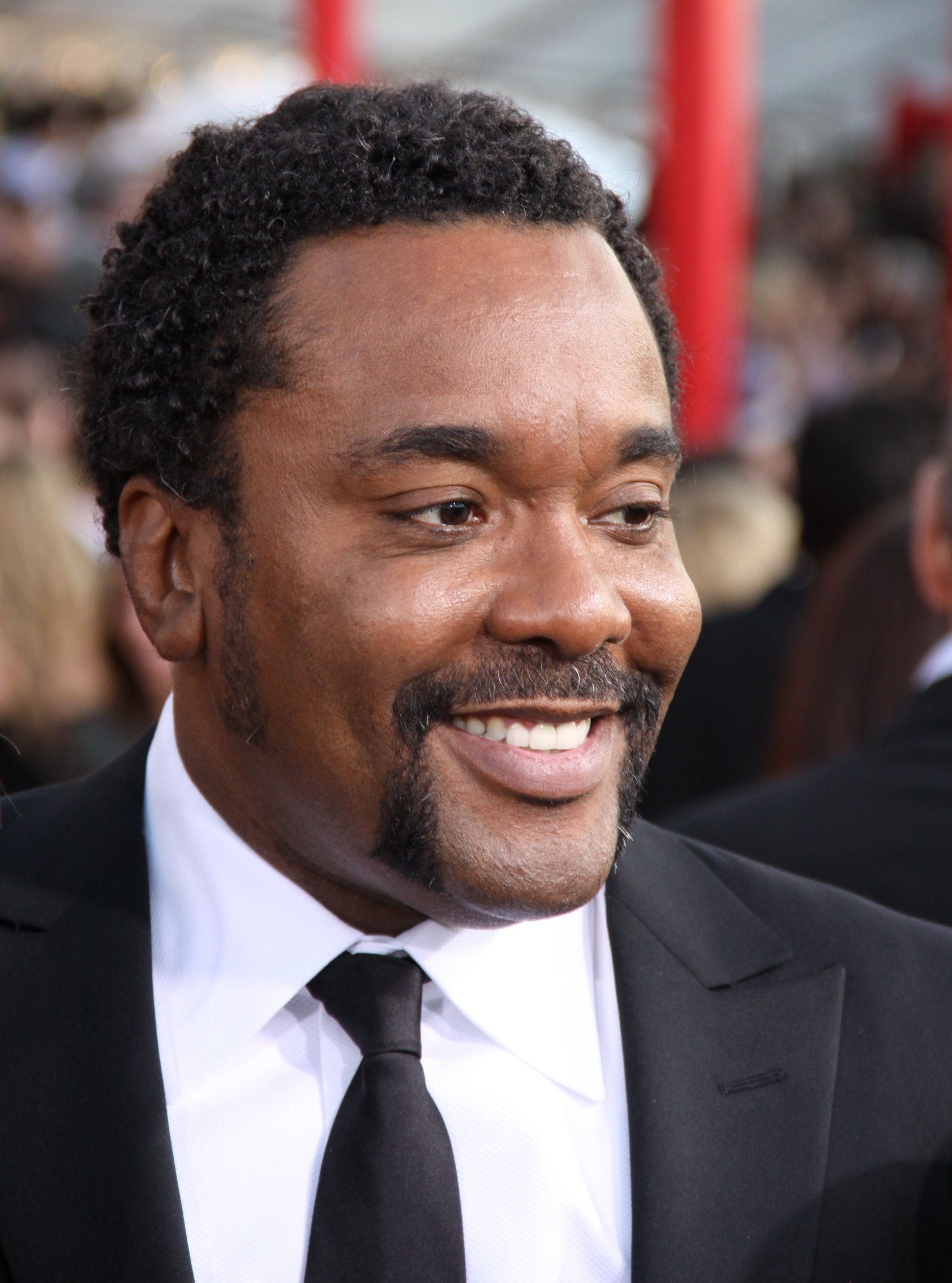
Director and producer Lee Daniels

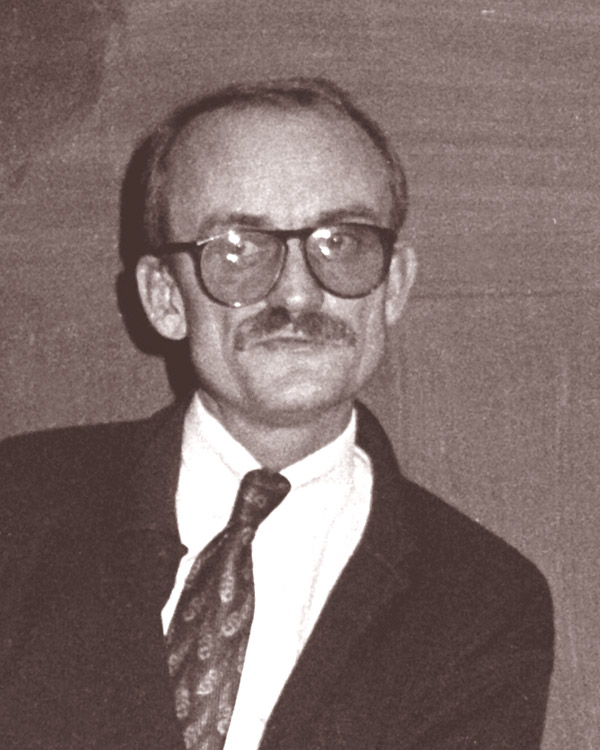
Sexologist Martin Dannecker

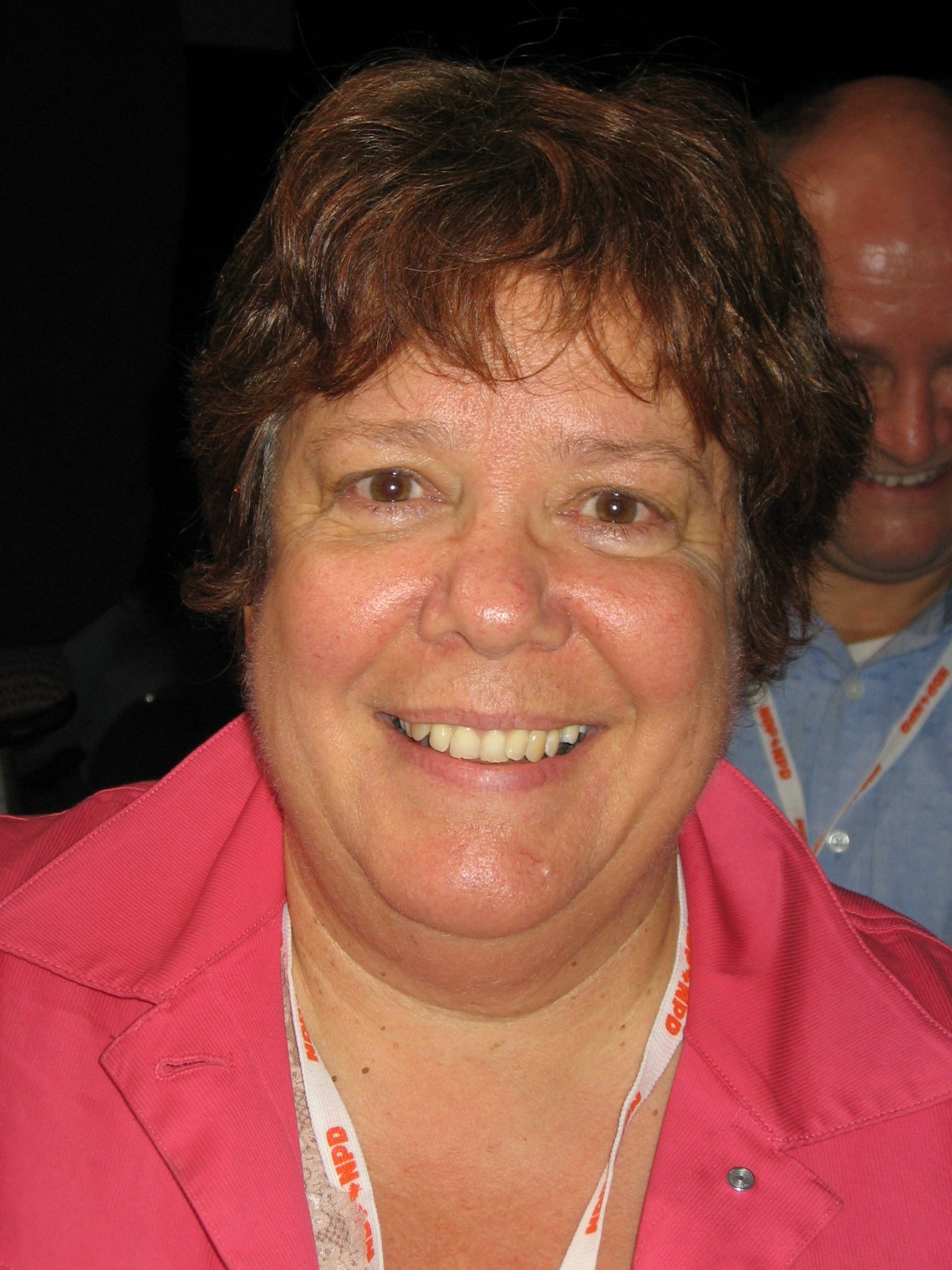
Politician Libby Davies

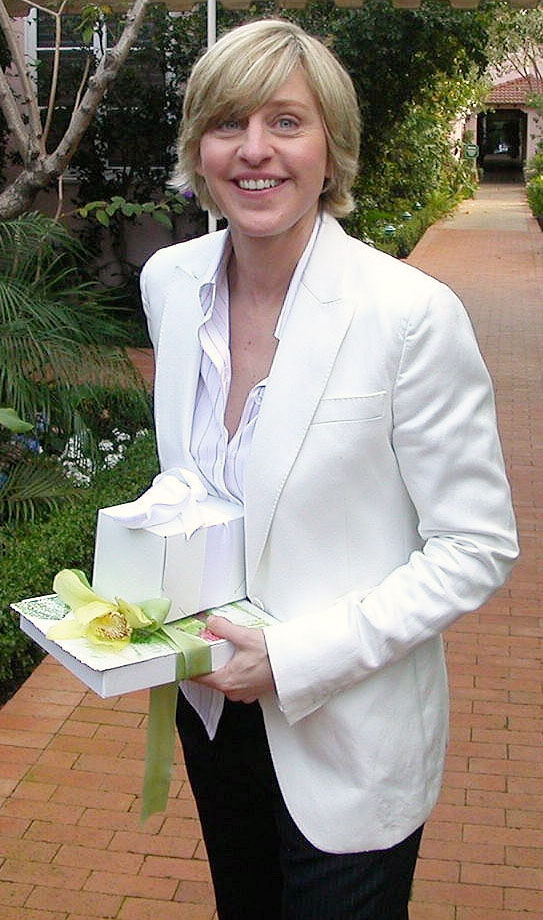
Comedian and talk show host Ellen DeGeneres

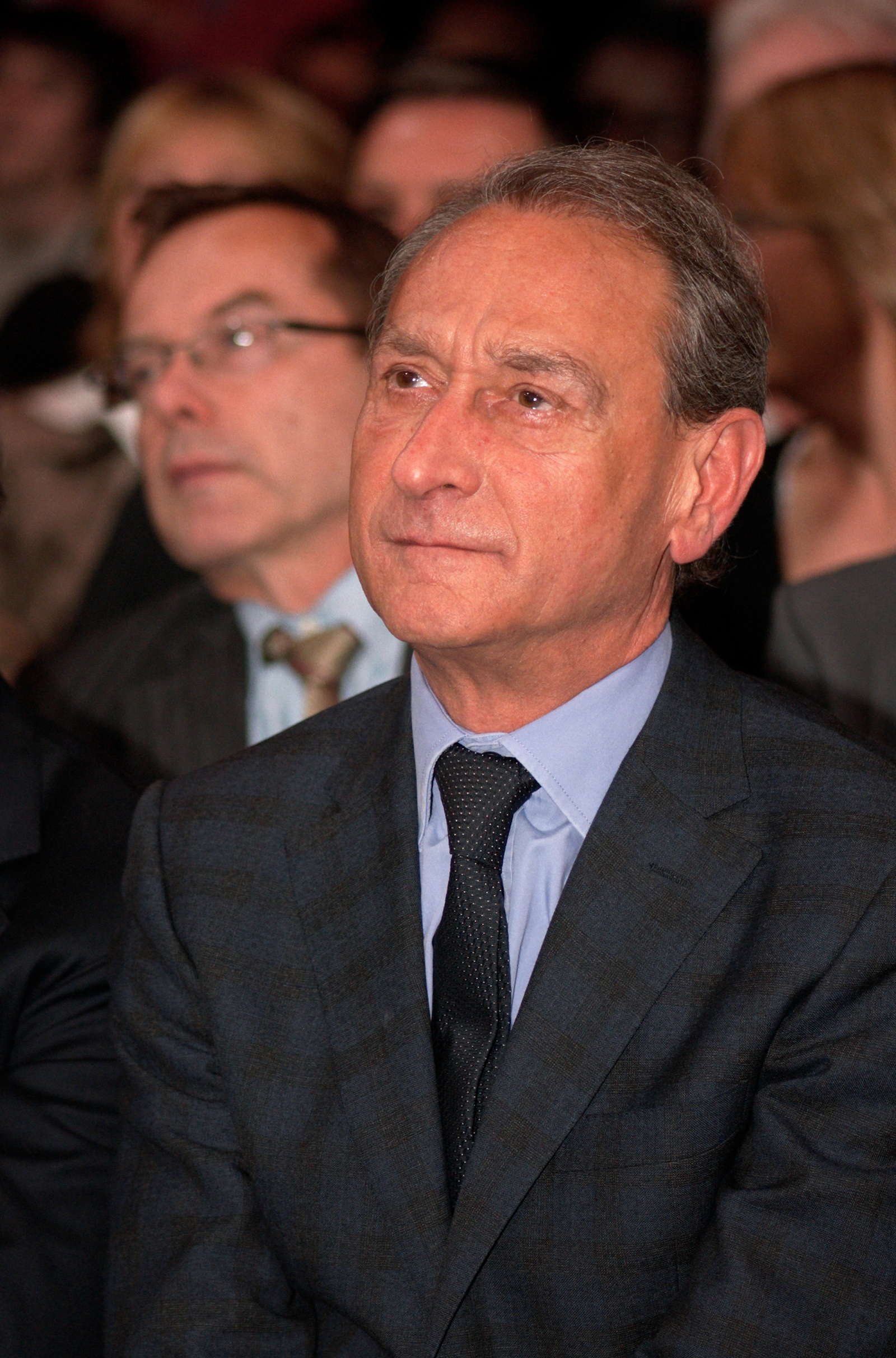
Politician Bertrand Delanoë

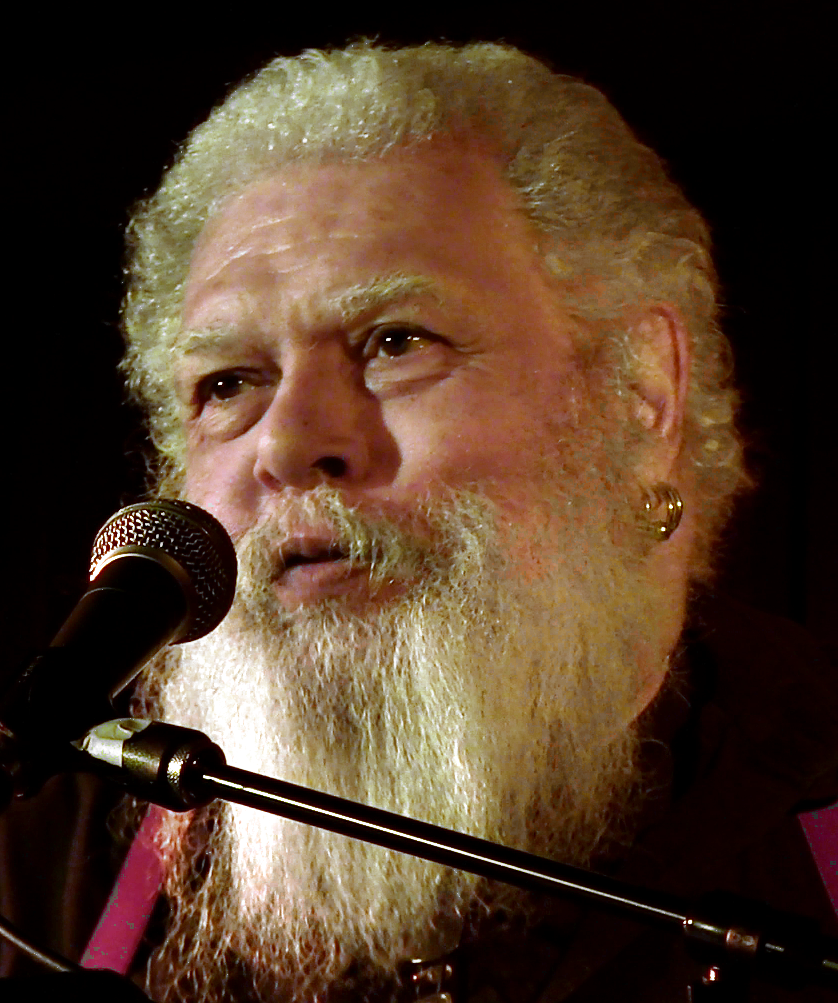
Author Samuel R. Delany

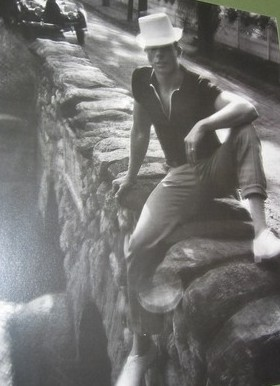
Interior designer Robert Denning

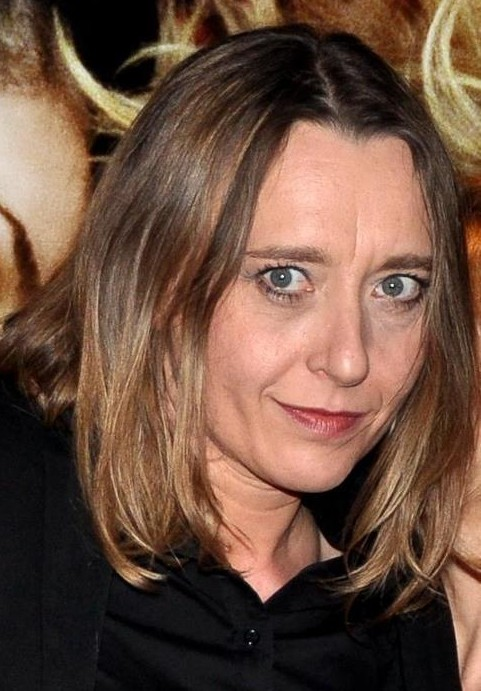
Author and filmmaker Virginie Despentes

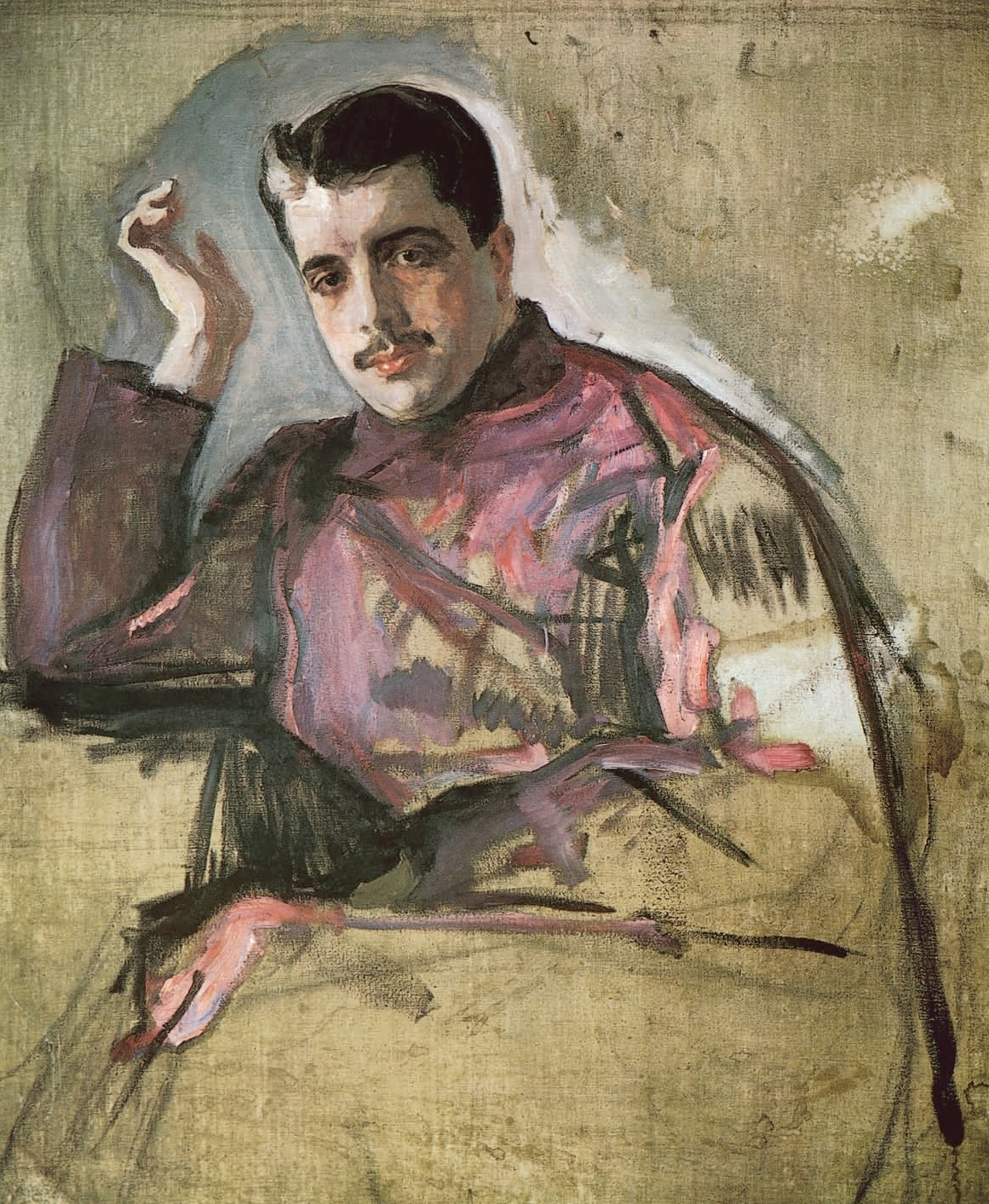
Ballet impresario Sergei Diaghilev

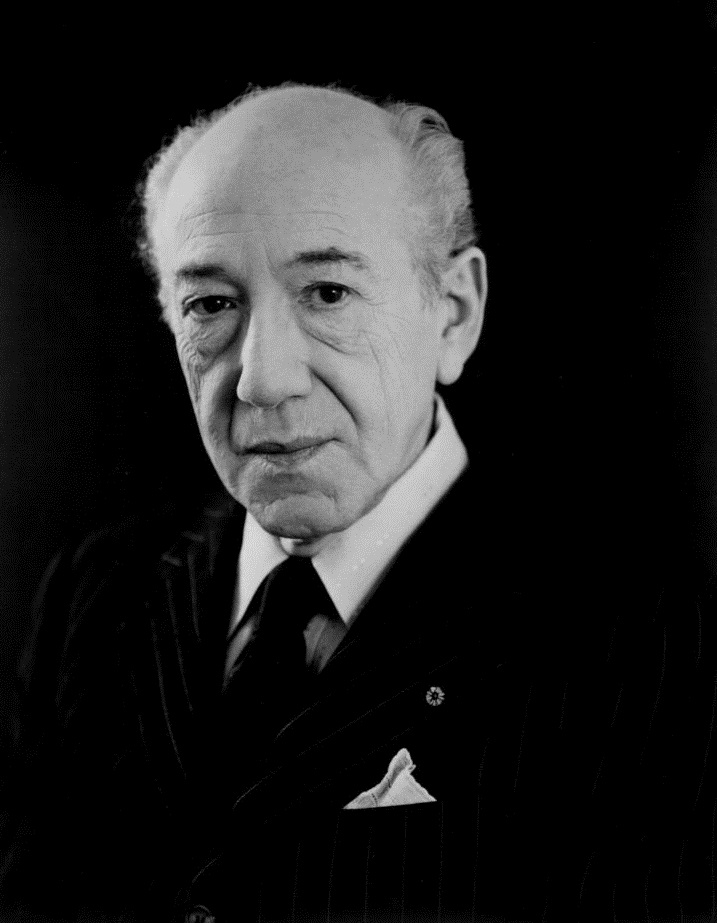
Composer David Diamond

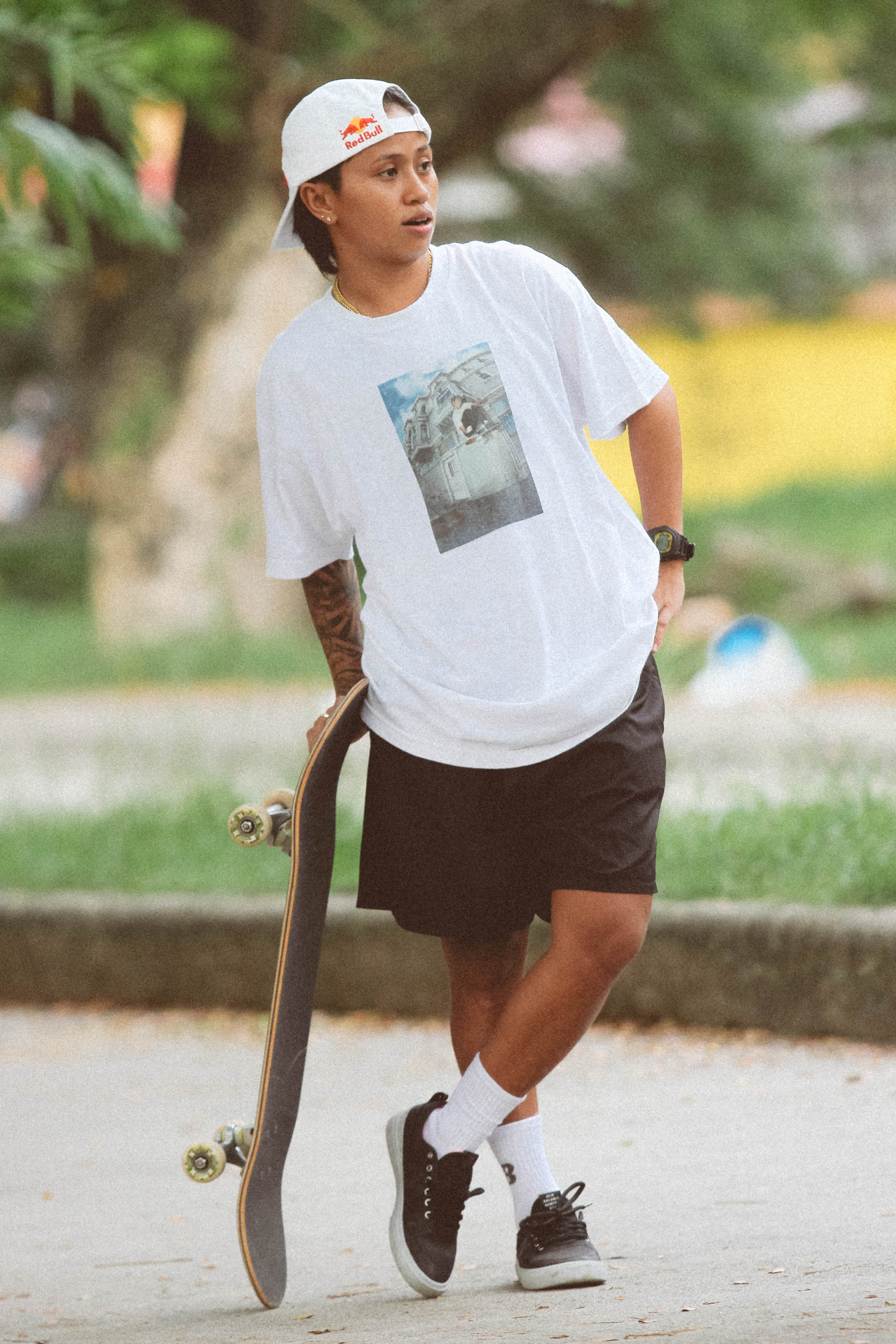
Skateboarder Margielyn Didal

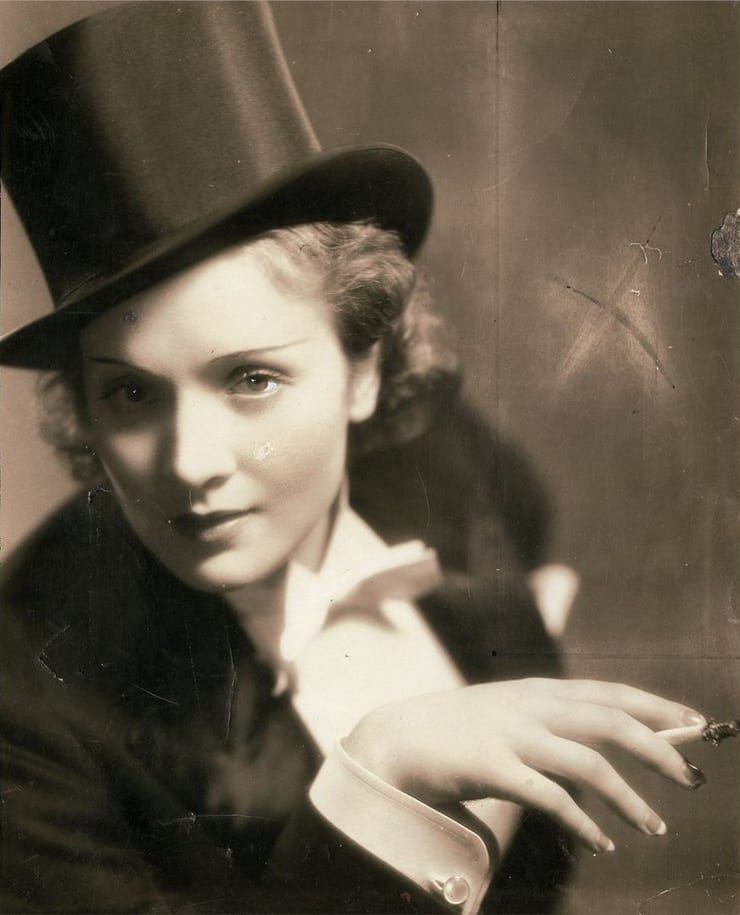
Actress and singer Marlene Dietrich

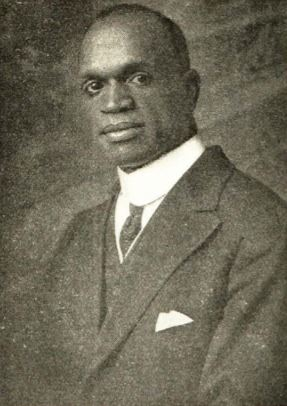
Sociologist, civil rights and labor activist and musician Augustus Granville Dill

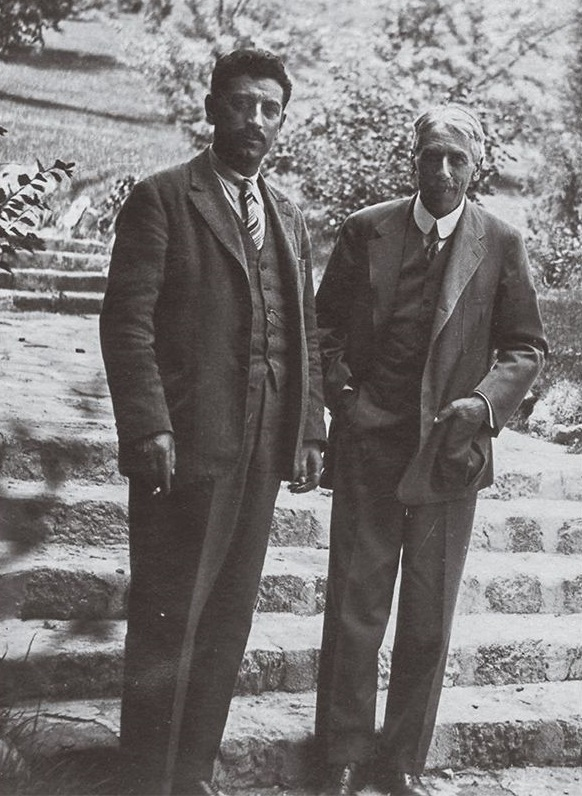
Ethnologist and writer Bajazid Doda (left) with partner Franz Nopcsa

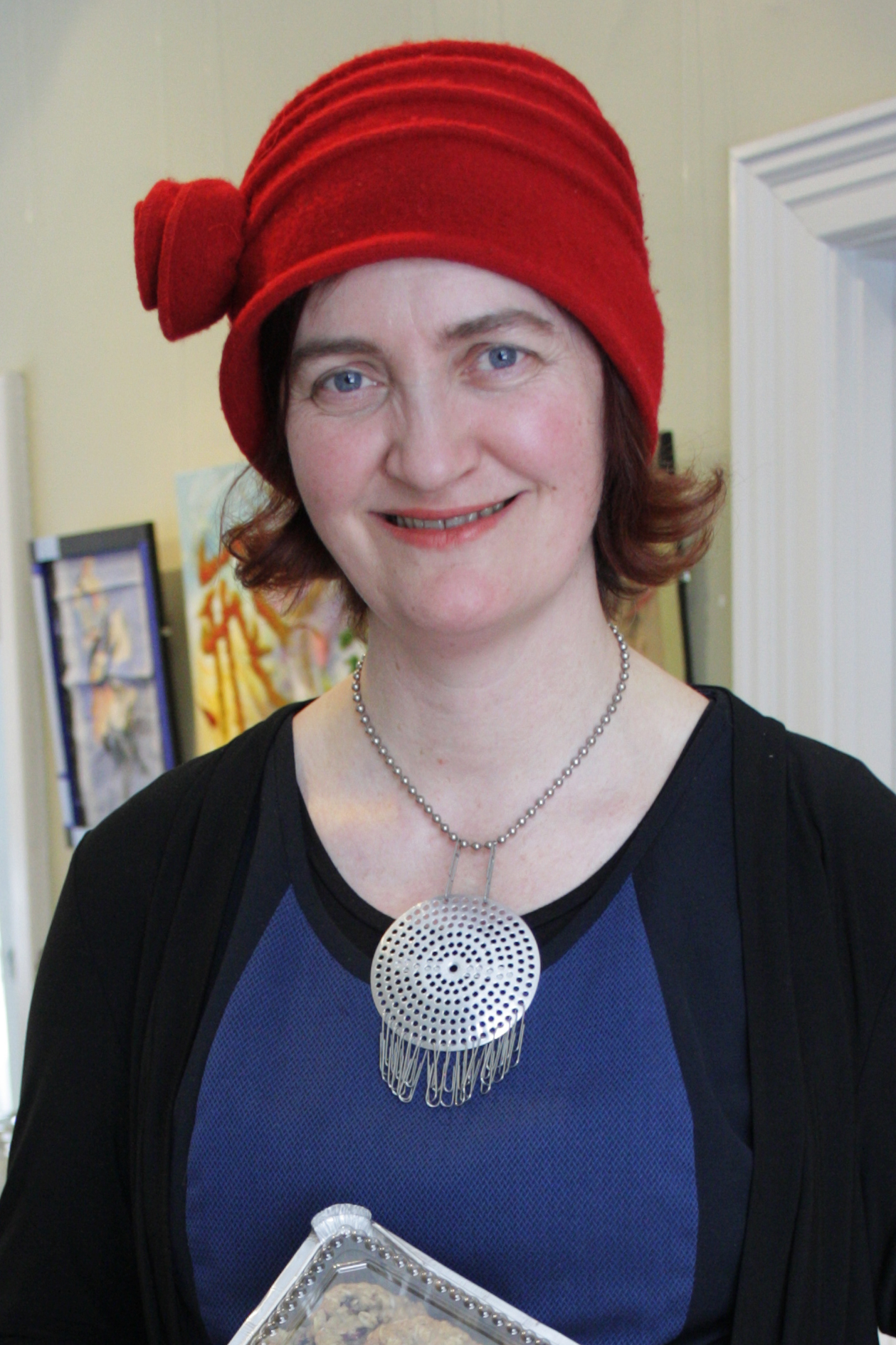
Writer Emma Donoghue

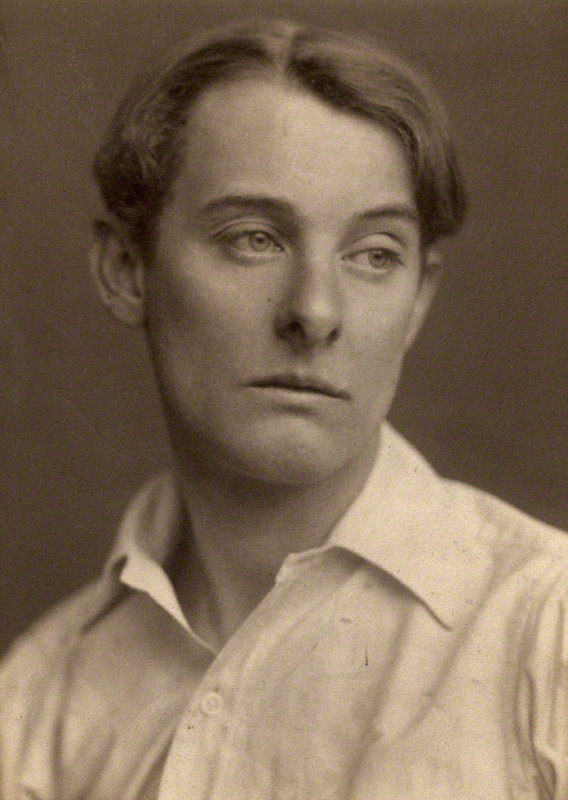
Writer Lord Alfred Douglas

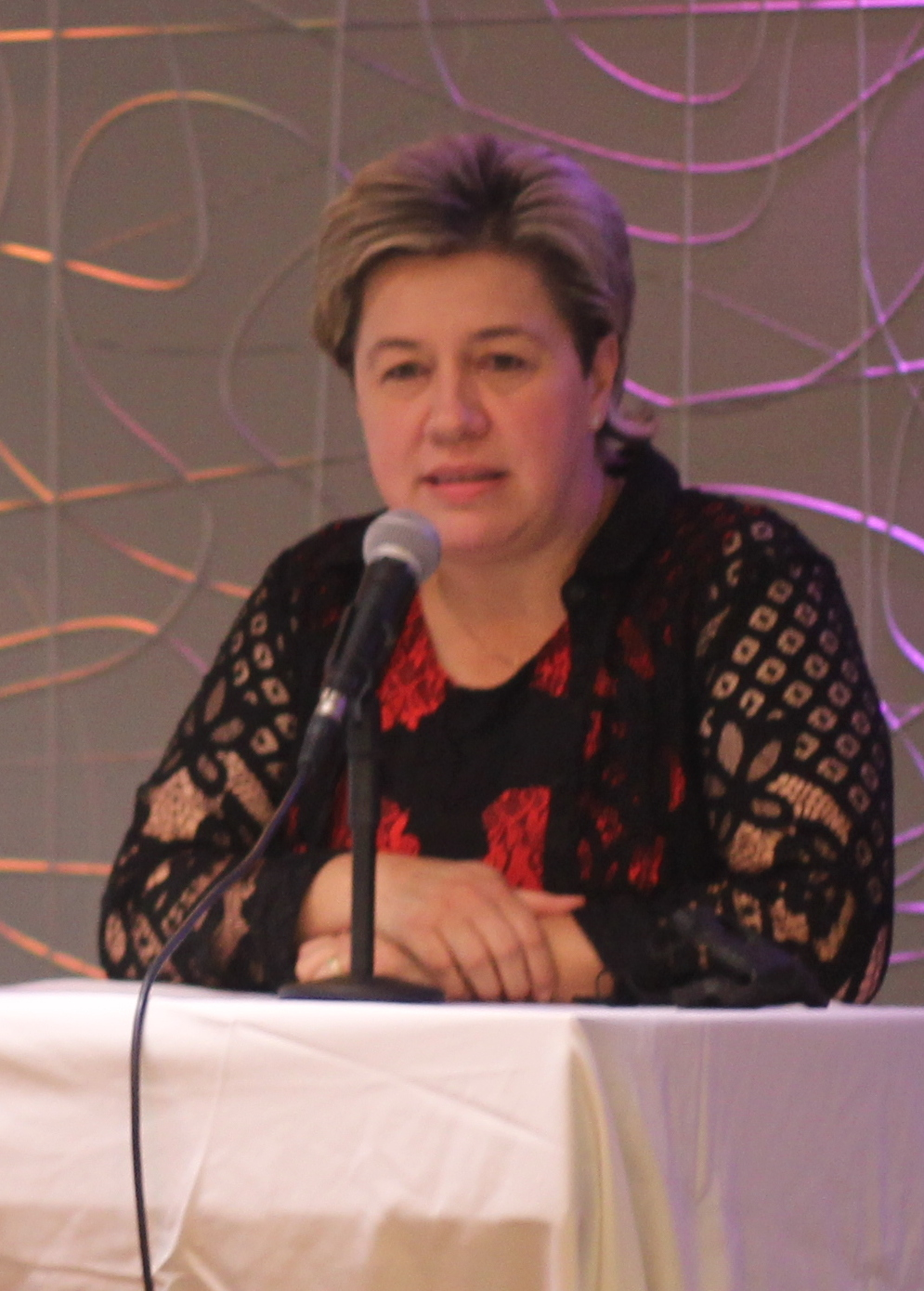
Ice hockey player and public speaker Nancy Drolet

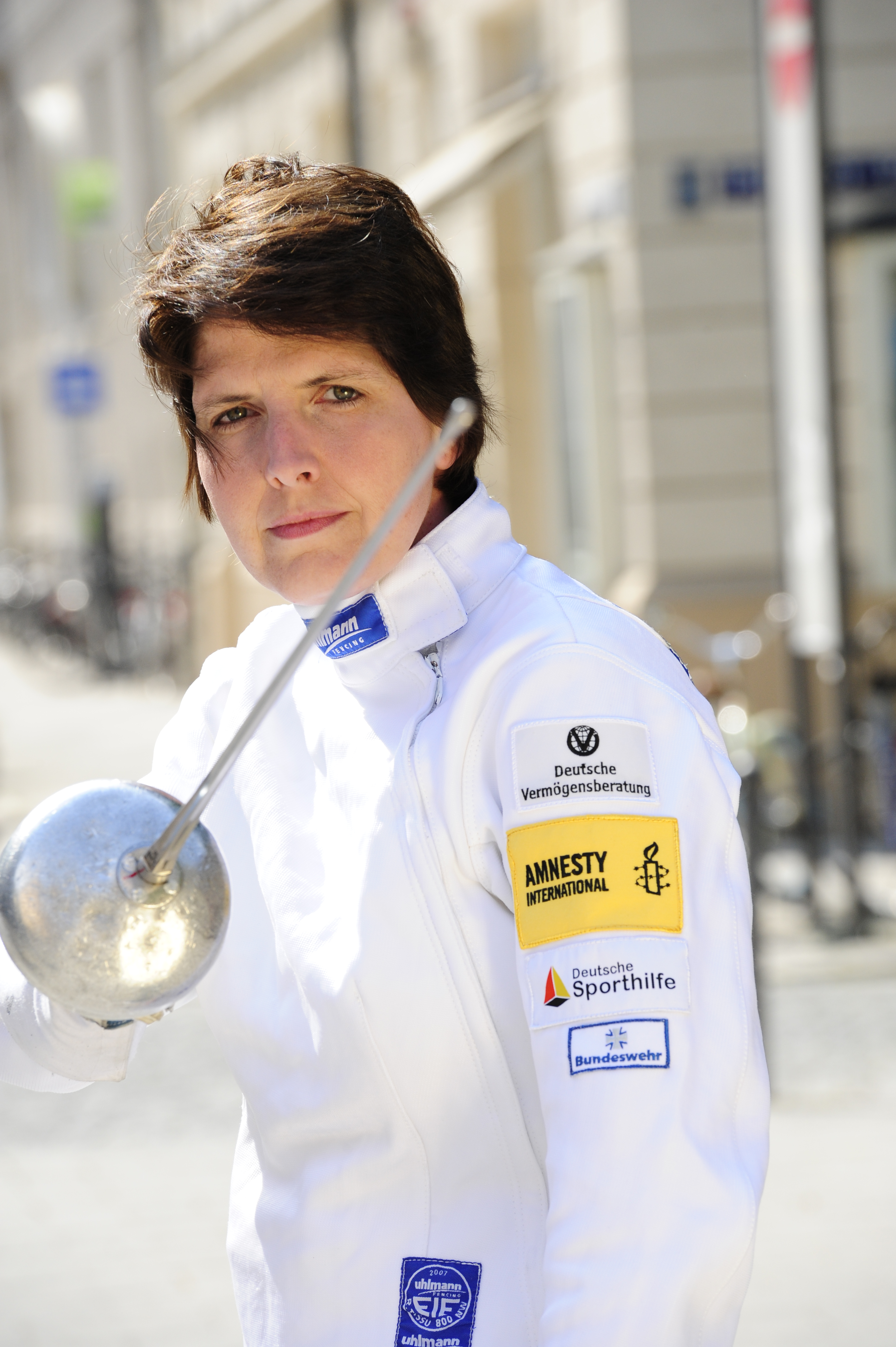
Fencer Imke Duplitzer

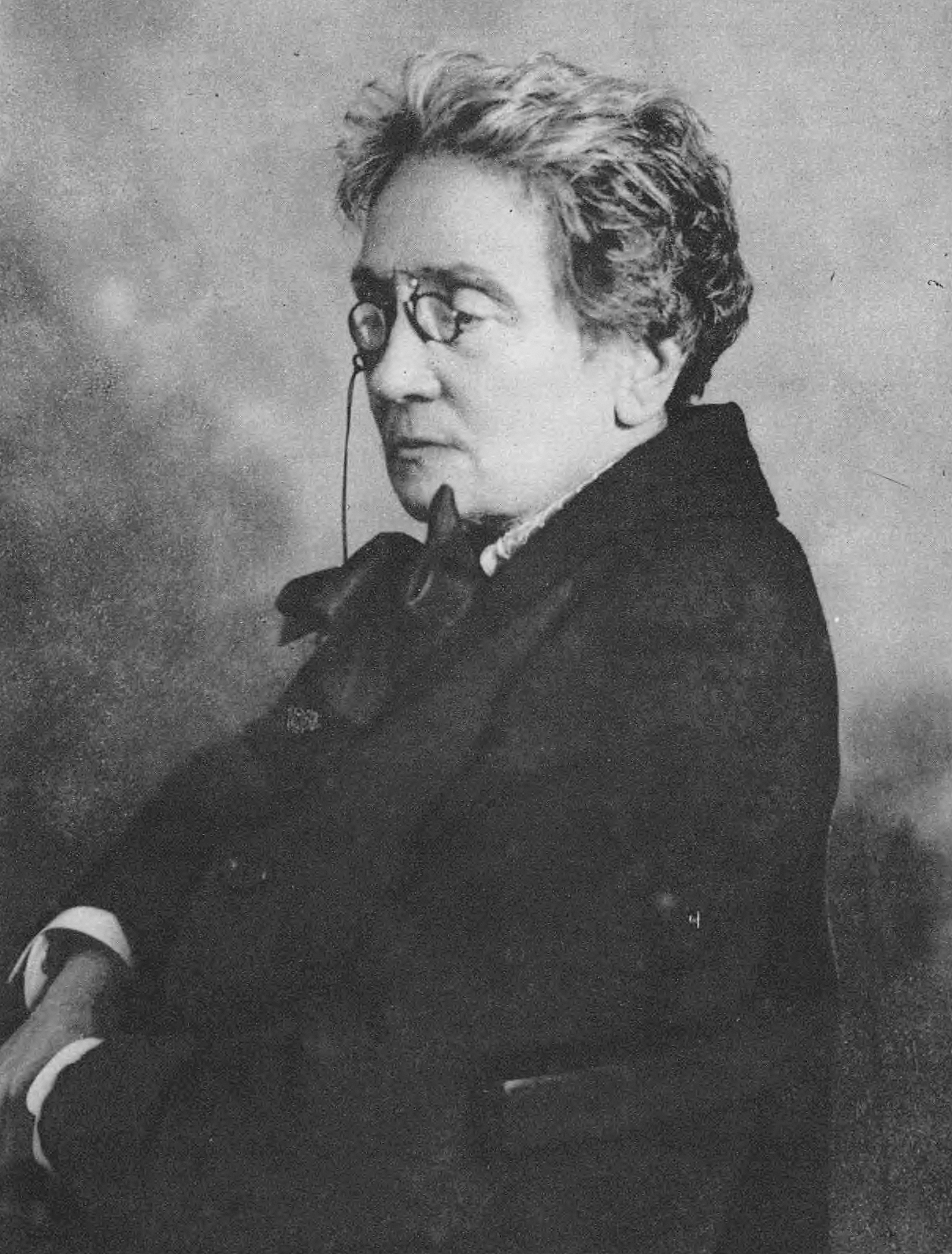
Painter and suffragette Maria Dulębianka

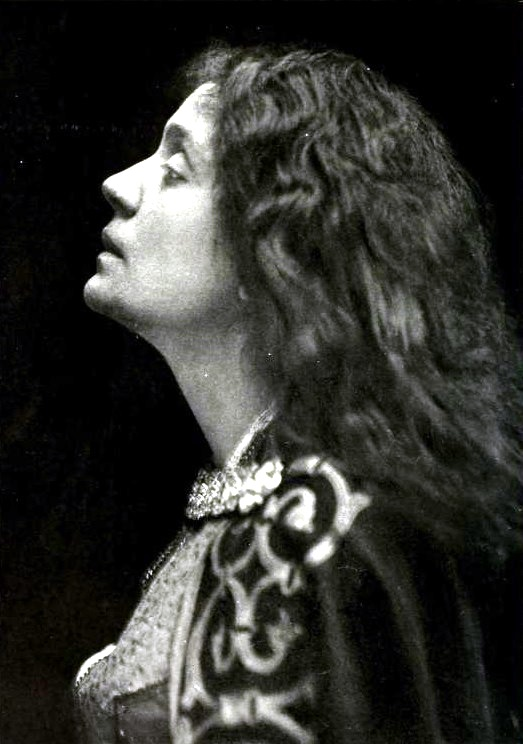
Actress Eleonora Duse

Name	Lifetime	Nationality	Notable as	Notes
Da Brat	b. 1974	American	Rapper	L
Maria Dąbrowska	1889–1965	Polish	Writer, novelist, essayist, journalist, playwright	B
Søren Dahl	b. 1993	Danish	Swimmer	G
Torstein Dahle	b. 1947	Norwegian	Politician, economist	G
Eva Dahlgren	b. 1960	Swedish	Pop musician	L
Lisa Dahlkvist	b. 1986	Swedish	Footballer	L
Jeffrey Dahmer	1960–1994	American	Serial killer	G
Dai Burger	b. ?	American	Rapper	L
Benjamin Daimary	b. 2000	Indian	Actor	G
Stephen Daldry	b. 1961	English	Film director	G
Grover Dale	b. 1935	American	Actor, dancer, choreographer	B
Iain Dale	b. 1962	English	Broadcaster, political blogger, publisher; first openly gay Conservative candidate to contest a Parliamentary election	G
James Dale	b. 1971	American	Boy Scouts leader expelled for being gay	G
Tom Daley	b. 1994	English	Diver	G
John Dall	1920–1971	American	Actor	G
Lucio Dalla	1943–2012	Italian	Singer-songwriter, musician, actor	G
Matt Dallas	b. 1982	American	Actor	G
Joe Dallesandro	b. 1948	American	Actor	B
Sam D'Allesandro	1956–1988	American	Writer	G
Gastón Dalmau	b. 1983	Argentine	Actor, singer	G
Ritu Dalmia	b. 1973	Indian	Chef, restaurateur	L
Blyth Daly	1901–1965	English–American	Actor	B
James Daly	1918–1978	American	Actor	G
Mary Daly	1928–2010	American	Feminist philosopher, theologian	L
Rachel Daly	b. 1991	English	Footballer	L
Lasizwe Dambuza	b. 1998	South African	TV and social media personality	G
Anne Seymour Damer	1748–1828	English	Sculptor	B
Giuliano Dami	1683–1750	Italian	Favourite and valet of Gian Gastone de' Medici, Grand Duke of Tuscany	G
Antonio D'Amico	b. 1959	Italian	Model, fashion designer	G
Danchyk	b. 1958	Belarusian	Singer, journalist	G
Seb Dance	b. 1981	English	Politician	G
Emily M. Danforth	b. 1980	American	Author	L
Elijah Daniel	b. 1994	American	Comedian, YouTuber, rapper, author	G
Herbert Daniel	1946–1992	Brazilian	Writer	G
Alain Daniélou	1907–1994	French	Academic, Hindu convert	G
Ben Daniels	b. 1964	English	Actor	G
David Daniels	b. 1966	American	Singer	G
Eugene Daniels	b. 1989	American	Journalist	G
Jake Daniels	b. 2005	English	Footballer	G
Jimmie Daniels	1908–1984	American	Cabaret performer, actor, model, nightclub owner	G
Kevin Daniels	b. 1976	American	Actor	G
Lee Daniels	b. 1959	American	Film producer, director	G
Sarah Daniels	b. 1957	English	Playwright	L
Stormy Daniels	b. 1979	American	Pornographic actress, stripper, director	B
Eleni Daniilidou	b. 1982	Greek	Tennis player	L
Jonathan Danilowitz	b. 1945	Israeli	Airline manager, civil rights case litigant	G
Jason Danino-Holt	b. 1987	Israeli	TV personality	G
Martin Dannecker	b. 1942	German	Sexologist, writer	G
Brian Dannelly	b. ?	American	Film director	G
Ran Danker	b. 1984	Israeli	Actor, singer, model	G
Paul Danquah	1925–2015	British	Actor, barrister, and bank consultant	G
Rudi van Dantzig	1933–2012	Dutch	Choreographer, ballet company director, writer	G
Darcelle XV	1930–2023	American	Drag queen, entertainer, cabaret owner and operator	G
Jessica Darrow	b. 1995	American	Actor, singer	L
John Darrow	1907-1980	American	Actor, film agent	G
Bella Darvi	1928–1971	Polish	Actor	B
Serafina Dávalos	1883–1957	Paraguayan	1st female lawyer in Paraguay	L
Madison Davenport	b. ?	American	Actress	B
Alphonso David	b. 1970	American	President of Human Rights Campaign, attorney, activist	G
Charlie David	b. 1980	Canadian	Actor	G
Sharice Davids	b. 1980	American	Attorney, mixed martial artist, politician	L
James Davidson	b. ?	British	Historian	G
Jaye Davidson	b. 1968	American-British	Actor, model	G
Ruth Davidson	b. 1978	Scottish	Politician	L
Tierna Davidson	b. 1998	American	Soccer player	L
Dave Davies	b. 1947	English	Rock musician (The Kinks)	B
Libby Davies	b. 1953	Canadian	Member of Parliament	B
Peter Maxwell Davies	1934–2016	English	Contemporary classical composer and conductor	G
Ron Davies	b. 1946	Welsh	Politician	B
Russell T Davies	b. 1963	Welsh	TV producer, writer	G
Steven Davies	b. 1986	English	Cricketer	G
Terence Davies	1945–2023	English	Filmmaker	G
Aldo Dávila	b. 1977	Guatemalan	Politician	G
Angela Davis	b. 1944	American	Activist	L
Brad Davis	1949–1991	American	Actor	B
Clive Davis	b. 1932	American	Record company executive	B
Evan Davis	b. 1962	English	Journalist, economist	G
Frederick W. Davis	1880–1961	American-Mexican	Art dealer	G
Liam Davis	b. 1990	English	Footballer	G
Levi Davis	b. 1998	English	Rugby union player (1st current player to come out as bisexual)	B
Madeline Davis	1940–2021	American	Activist	L
Tanya Davis	b. ?	Canadian	musician, poet	B
Vaginal Davis	b. 1969	American	Artist	L
Wade Davis	b. 1977	American	Writer, football player	G
Dehenna Davison	b. 1993	English	Politician, broadcaster	B
Ninetto Davoli	b. 1948	Italian	Actor	B
Amber Dawn	b. ?	Canadian	Writer	L
Curt Dawson	c. 1942–1985	American	Actor	G
David Dawson	b. 1982	English	Actor	G
Shane Dawson	b. 1988	American	Internet personality	B
Dennis Day	1942–2018	American	Actor, singer, theatre director	G
F. Holland Day	1864–1933	American	Photographer, publisher	G
Spencer Day	b. 1978	American	Musician	G
Daya	b. 1998	American	Singer	B
Richard Deacon	1921–1984	American	Actor	G
Deadlee	b. ?	American	Rapper	G
Larry Dean	b. 1989	Scottish	Comedian	G
Terrence Dean	1968-2022	American	Writer, author, former MTV executive, and speaker	G
Victoria De Angelis	b. 2000	Italian	Rock musician (Måneskin)	B
Dick DeBartolo	b. 1945	American	Comic writer, satirist	G
Dean DeBlois	b. 1970	Canadian	Film director, animator	G
Gabriela DeBues-Stafford	b. 1995	Canadian	Middle-distance runner	B
Ángel de Brito	b. 1976	Argentine	Journalist	G
Piet De Bruyn	b. 1968	Belgian	Politician	G
Frank DeCaro	b. 1962	American	Writer, performer	G
John Paul De Cecco	1925–2017	American	Academic writer, professor	G
Jeanine Deckers, a.k.a. "The Singing Nun"	1933–1985	Belgian	Musician, clergy	L
Daniel Defert	b. 1937	French	AIDS activist, partner of Michel Foucault	G
Ellen DeGeneres	b. 1958	American	Comedian, actor, talk show host	L
Jerry DeGrieck	b. ?	American	Public health manager and policy advisor	G
Jacek Dehnel	b. 1980	Polish	Writer, translator	G
Andreas Deja	b. 1957	German	Animator	G
Thomas Dekker	b. 1987	American	Actor	G
Jonathan Del Arco	b. 1966	American	Actor	G
Dennis Del Valle	b. 1989	Puerto Rican	Volleyball player	G
Adore Delano	b. 1989	American	Drag queen, entertainer	G
Bertrand Delanoë	b. 1950	French	Politician	G
Samuel R. Delany	b. 1942	American	Author	G
Lea DeLaria	b. 1958	American	Comedian, actor, jazz musician	L
Stormé DeLarverie	1920–2014	American	Civil rights activist, entertainer	L
Stuart F. Delery	b. 1968	American	Attorney; White House Counsel	G
Cara Delevingne	b. 1992	English	Model, actor	L
Alicia Delgado	1959–2009	Peruvian	Folk singer	L
Juliana Delgado Lopera	b. 1988	American	Writer and performer	L
Gabi Delgado-López	1958–2020	Spanish-German	Musician (Deutsch Amerikanische Freundschaft)	B
Casey Dellacqua	b. 1985	Australian	Tennis player	L
Elena Delle Donne	b. 1989	American	Basketball player	L
Paul Delph	1957–1996	American	Singer, songwriter, producer, engineer, studio musician	G
Christine Delphy	b. 1941	French	Sociologist	L
Bianca Del Rio	b. 1975	American	Drag queen, entertainer	G
David Del Tredici	b. 1937	American	Contemporary classical composer	G
Dennis Del Valle	b. 1989	Puerto Rican	Volleyball player	G
Carl DeMaio	b. 1974	American	Politician; 1st openly gay member of the San Diego City Council	G
Valerie Demey	b. 1994	Belgian	Racing cyclist	L
John D'Emilio	b. 1948	American	Historian	G
Barbara Deming	1917–1984	American	Activist	L
Demna	b. 1981	Georgian	Fashion designer	G
Rosemary Dempsey	b. ?	American	Lawyer, activist	L
Shawna Dempsey	b. ?	Canadian	Performance artist and writer	L
Leeann Dempster	b. ?	Scottish	CEO of Hibernian F.C.	L
Charles Demuth	1883–1935	American	Painter	G
Robert De Niro, Sr.	1922–1993	American	Painter	B
Benoit Denizet-Lewis	b. ?	American	Journalist	G
Barry Dennen	b. 1938	American	Actor, writer	G
Robert Denning	1927–2005	American	Interior designer	G
Nicole Dennis-Benn	b. ?	Jamaican	Novelist	L
Nick De Noia	1941–1987	American	Director, screenwriter, choreographer	G
David Denson	b. 1995	American	1st openly gay active player affiliated with an MLB organization	G
Denice Denton	1959–2006	American	Academic	L
Nick Denton	b. 1967	English	Journalist, blogger	G
Carla Denyer	b. 1985	English	Politician	B
Lily-Rose Depp	b. 1999	French-American	Actress, model	B
Sonali Deraniyagala	b. 1964	Sri Lankan	Economist, memoirist	L
Dena DeRose	b. 1966	American	Jazz musician	L
Timo Descamps	b. 1986	Belgian	Actor, singer	G
André De Shields	b. 1946	American	Entertainer	G
Felipa de Souza	1556–1600	Brazilian	Lesbian during the Brazilian colonial era	L
Virginie Despentes	b. 1969	French	Author, filmmaker	L
Clémence DesRochers	b. 1933	Canadian	Actor, humorist, singer, author	L
Gauthier Destaney	b. 1979	Luxembourgish	Architect and husband of Prime Minister of Luxembourg Xavier Bettel	G
Conrad Detrez	1937–1985	Belgian	Writer	G
Sonya Deville	b. 1993	American	Professional wrestler, mixed martial artist	L
Abrahm DeVine	b. 1996	American	Swimmer	G
Tony De Vit	1957–1998	English	Disk jockey	G
Steve Devonas	b. 1989	Swiss	Actor	G
Devours	b. ?	Canadian	Electronic musician	G
Abby DeWald	b. ?	American	Musician (The Ditty Bops)	L
Ghalib Shiraz Dhalla	b. ?	American	Writer	G
Lukas Dhont	b. 1991	Belgian	Film director, screenwriter	G
Sergei Diaghilev	1872–1929	Russian	Art critic, ballet patron, founder of Ballets Russes	G
Lucy Diakovska	b. 1976	Bulgarian-German	Pop singer (No Angels), actor	L
David Diamond	1915–2005	American	Composer	G
Guillermo Díaz	b. 1975	American	Actor	G
Ogie Diaz	b. 1970	Filipino	Actor, comedian	B
Scott Dibble	b. 1965	American	Politician	G
Tofik Dibi	b. 1980	Dutch	Politician	G
Andy Dick	b. 1965	American	Actor, comedian	B
Chris Dickerson	1939–2021	American	Bodybuilder (1st Black AAU Mr. America; 1st openly gay winner of the IFBB Mr. Olympia contest)	G
Suran Dickson	b. 1977	New Zealand	LGBT activist	L
Dave Dictor	b. 1955	American	Punk rock musician (MDC)	B
Margielyn Didal	b. 1999	Filipino	Skateboarder	L
Babe Didrikson Zaharias	1911–1956	American	Track and field athlete, golfer, basketball player, Olympic medalist	B
Marlene Dietrich	1901–1992	German	Actor	B
Vincent Dieutre	b. 1960	French	Film director	G
Ani DiFranco	b. 1970	American	Rock musician	B
Kristian Digby	1977–2010	English	TV presenter, director	G
Sanne van Dijke	b. 1995	Dutch	Judoka	L
Augustus Granville Dill	1882–1956	American	Sociologist, labor and civil rights activist, musician	G
Barry Diller	b. 1942	American	Businessman, media executive	G
Ricky Dillon	b. 1992	American	YouTube personality, singer-songwriter	G
Nyle DiMarco	b. 1989	American	Model, actor, deaf activist	B
Diane DiMassa	b. 1959	American	Cartoonist	L
Luka Dimić	b. 1986	German-Croatian	Actor	G
Alex Dimitrov	b. 1984	Bulgarian-American	Poet	G
Emil Dimitrov	1940–2005	Bulgarian	Pop singer	G
Halil İbrahim Dinçdağ	b. 1976	Turkish	Football referee, athlete	G
Carolyn Dinshaw	b. ?	American	Academic, author	L
Christian Dior	1905–1957	French	Fashion designer	G
Juan Pablo Di Pace	b. 1979	Argentine	Actor, singer, and director	G
Carlien Dirkse van den Heuvel	b. 1987	Dutch	Field hockey player	L
Dirk Dirksen	1937–2006	American	Music promoter	G
Elio Di Rupo	b. 1951	Belgian	Politician, Minister-President of Wallonia	G
J. D. Disalvatore	1966–2017	American	Film director, producer	L
Thomas M. Disch	1940–2008	American	Writer	G
Beth Ditto	b. 1981	American	Rock musician (Gossip)	L
Boris Dittrich	b. 1955	Dutch	Politician, LGBT rights activist	G
Dorothy Dittrich	b. ?	Canadian	Playwright, composer	L
Sushant Divgikar	b. ?	Indian	Model, actor, singer	G
Divine	1945–1988	American	Actor, drag performer	G
Massimo Dobrovic	b. 1984	Croatian-Italian	Actor	G
Alix Dobkin	1940–2021	American	Folk singer-songwriter, memoirist, lesbian feminist activist	L
Jess Dobkin	b. 1970	Canadian	Performance artist	L
Farzana Doctor	b. ?	Canadian	Writer	L
Bajazid Doda	1888–1933	Albanian	Ethnographic writer, photographer	G
Nik Dodani	b. 1994	American	Actor, comedian, activist	G
Betty Dodson	1929–2020	American	Sex educator	B
Owen Dodson	1914–1983	American	Poet, novelist, playwright	G
Doechii	b. 1998	American	Rapper, singer	B
Johanna Dohnal	1939–2010	Austrian	Politician	L
Doja Cat	b. 1995	American	Singer, rapper	B
Terry Dolan	1950–1986	American	Republican Party operative	G
Xavier Dolan	b. 1989	Canadian	Film director, actor, screenwriter	G
Domenico Dolce	b. 1958	Italian	Fashion designer, Dolce & Gabbana	G
Rachel Dolezal	b. 1977	American	Author, activist, artist, NAACP chapter president, a woman of European ancestry that identifies as black	B
Jonathan Dollimore	b. 1948	English	Sociologist, social theorist	G
Stefanie Dolson	b. 1992	American	Basketball player	L
Colman Domingo	b. 1969	American	Actor	G
Ann Donahue	b. ?	American	TV writer	L
Herb Donaldson	1927–2008	American	Lawyer, judge	G
Ian Donaldson	b. ?	English	Musician (Bronski Beat)	G
Stephen Donaldson	1946–1996	American	Activist	G
Arthur Dong	b. ?	American	Filmmaker	G
Dong Xian	c. 23–1 BC	Chinese (Han Dynasty)	Courtier	B
Jorge Donn	1947–1992	Argentine	Ballet dancer	G
Renaud Donnedieu de Vabres	b. 1954	French	Politician	G
Finbarr Donnelly	1962–1989	Irish	Singer-songwriter (Five Go Down to the Sea?)	G
Emma Donoghue	b. 1969	Irish-Canadian	Writer	L
Amanda Donohoe	b. 1962	English	Actor	B
José Donoso	1924–1996	Chilean	Writer	G
Alexander Donskoy	b. ?	Russian	Politician	G
Hunter Doohan	b. 1994	American	Actor	G
Savannah Dooley	b. 1985	American	Screenwriter	L
Thomas Anthony Dooley III	1927–1961	American	Physician, humanitarian, CIA intelligence operative	G
Gia Doonan	b. 1994	American	Rower	L
Simon Doonan	b. 1952	English	Creative Ambassador-at-Large of the New York City-based clothing store Barneys	G
Mary Dorcey	b. 1950	Irish	Author, poet, novelist, LGBT and women's rights activist	L
Tommy Dorfman	b. 1992	American	Actor	G
Heinz Dörmer	1912–2001	German	Youth leader, imprisoned by Nazis	G
Karey Dornetto	b. ?	American	Screenwriter	L
Issan Dorsey	1933–1990	American	Soto Zen Buddhist	G
Alfonso Dosal	b. 1985	Mexican	Actor	B
Dotan	b. 1986	Dutch-Israeli	Singer	G
Jason Dottley	b. 1980	American	Actor, pop singer	G
Mark Doty	b. 1953	American	Poet	G
Cecilia Dougherty	b. ?	American	Artist	L
Lord Alfred Douglas	1870–1945	English	Poet, lover of Oscar Wilde	B
Kyan Douglas	b. 1970	American	TV personality, stylist	G
Michelle Douglas	b. 1963	Canadian	Former soldier, LGBT rights activist	L
Orville Lloyd Douglas	b. 1976	Canadian	Writer	G
Edward Douglas-Scott-Montagu, 3rd Baron Montagu of Beaulieu	1927–2015	English	Politician	B
Gregory Douglass	b. 1980	American	Musician	G
Robert Dover	b. 1956	American	Equestrian	G
Anthony Dowell	b. 1943	English	Ballet dancer, artistic director	G
Brian Dowling	b. 1978	Irish	TV presenter	G
Anton Down-Jenkins	b. 1999	New Zealand	Diver	G
Deidre Downs	b. 1980	American	Physician; 1st former Miss America national titleholder to enter a same-sex marriage	L
Glennon Doyle	b. 1976	American	Author	L
Lauren Doyle	b. 1991	American	Rugby sevens player	L
Matt Doyle	b. 1987	American	Actor, singer-songwriter	G
Mike Doyle	b. 1972	American	Actor, screenwriter, director, producer	G
Emily Drabinski	b. 1975	American	Librarian, educator	L
Marigona Dragusha	b. 1990	Kosovan	1st openly lesbian Miss Kosovo	L
David Drake	b. 1963	American	Actor	G
Karla Drenner	b. 1961	American	Politician, academic	L
Donna Dresch	b. ?	American	Rock musician (Team Dresch)	L
Jack Drescher	b. 1951	American	Psychiatrist, psychoanalyst	G
James Dreyfus	b. 1968	English	Actor	G
Tom Driberg, Baron Bradwell	1905–1976	English	Politician, journalist	G
Ryan Driller	b. 1982	American	Pornographic actor	G
Drew Droege	b. ?	American	Actor	G
Gert-Jan Dröge	1943–2007	Dutch	TV presenter, producer, actor, journalist, writer	G
Nancy Drolet	b. 1973	Canadian	Ice hockey player	L
Ed Droste	b. 1978	American	Musician (Grizzly Bear)	G
Drubskin	b. 1973	American	Artist	G
Malka Drucker	b. 1945	American	Rabbi, writer	L
Helene von Druskowitz	1856–1918	Austrian	Philosopher, writer, music critic	L
Thomas Duane	b. 1955	American	Politician	G
Carol Duarte	b. 1991	Brazilian	Actor	L
Martin Duberman	b. 1932	American	Historian	G
René-Daniel Dubois	b. 1955	Canadian	Writer	G
Sandi Simcha DuBowski	b. 1970	American	Filmmaker	G
Francis Ducharme	b. 1981	Canadian	Actor, dancer	G
Carol Ann Duffy	b. 1955	Scottish	Poet	L
Maureen Duffy	1933–2026	English	Poet, playwright and writer	L
Stella Duffy	b. 1963	English	Novelist, playwright	L
Bevan Dufty	b. 1955	American	Politician	G
Kezia Dugdale	b. 1981	Scottish	Politician	L
Greg Duhaime	1953–1992	Canadian	Distance runner	G
André van Duin	b. 1947	Dutch	Actor, pop musician, writer	G
Maria Dulębianka	1861–1919	Polish	Writer, suffragist	L
Bonnie Dumanis	b. 1951	American	District Attorney	L
Céline Dumerc	b. 1982	French	Basketball player	L
Lucian Dunăreanu	b. 1987	Romanian	LGBT rights activist, magazine editor	G
Karen Dunbar	b. 1971	Scottish	Comedian, actor	L
Alice Dunbar-Nelson	1875–1935	American	Poet, journalist, political activist	B
Alan Duncan	b. 1957	English	Member of Parliament	G
Eric Duncan	b. 1977	Canadian	Member of Parliament	G
Isadora Duncan	1887–1927	American	Dancer	B
Katie Duncan	b. 1988	New Zealand	Footballer	L
Priscilla Duncan	b. 1983	New Zealand	Footballer	L
Robert Duncan	1919–1988	American	Poet	G
Zélia Duncan	b. 1964	Brazilian	Singer-songwriter	L
Abby Dunkin	b. 1995	American	Wheelchair basketball player	L
Simon Dunn	1987–2023	Australian	Bobsledder	G
Jack Dunne	b. 1998	Irish	Rugby player	B
Kristyn Dunnion	b. 1969	Canadian	Writer, performance artist	L
Don Dunstan	1926–1999	Australian	Politician	G
Cheryl Dunye	b. 1966	American	Film director	L
Larry Duplechan	b. 1956	American	Writer	G
Imke Duplitzer	b. 1975	German	Fencer	L
Candice Dupree	b. 1984	American	Basketball player	L
Andrés Duque	b. ?	Colombian-American	Activist, journalist, blogger	G
Alonso Duralde	b. 1967	American	Film critic	G
John Duran	b. ?	American	Mayor of West Hollywood	G
Victorina Durán	1899–1993	Spanish	Painter, set and costume designer	L
Blanca Inés Durán Hernández	b. 1971	Colombian	Industrial engineer, former mayor of Chapinero	L
Christopher Durang	1949–2024	American	Playwright	G
Jenny Durkan	b. 1958	American	Lawyer, mayor	L
Eleonora Duse	1859–1924	Italian	Actor	B
Guillaume Dustan	1965–2005	French	Writer	G
Rayan Dutra	b. 2002	Brazilian	Trampoline gymnast	B
Clea DuVall	b. 1977	American	Actor, film director	L
Andrea Dworkin	1946–2005	American	Feminist, LGBT rights activist	L
Deborah Dyer	b. 1967	English	Rock musician (Skunk Anansie)	B
Elana Dykewomon	1949–2022	American	Activist, writer	L

== E ==
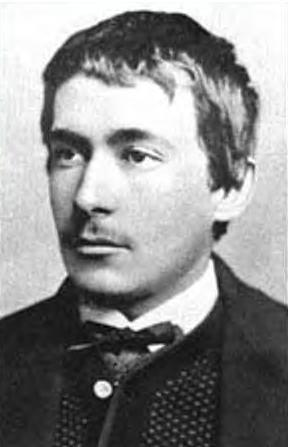
Painter Thomas Eakins

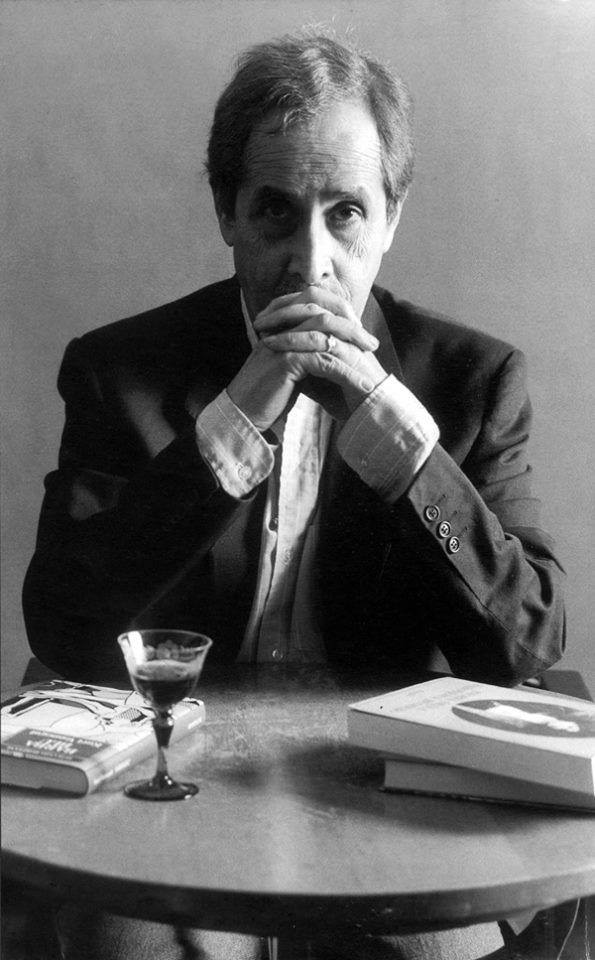
Artist and writer Jorge Eduardo Eielson

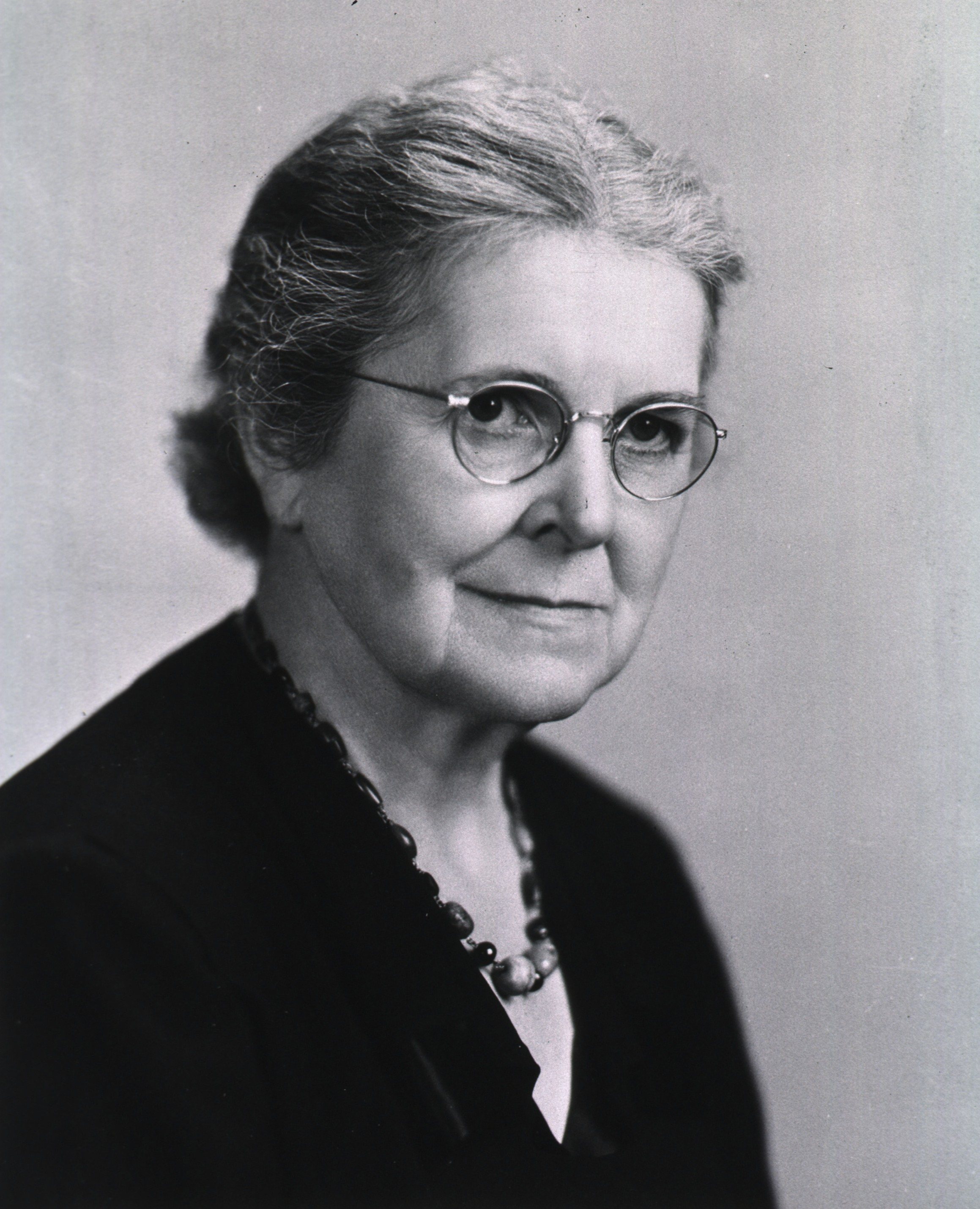
Pediatrician and public health specialist Martha Eliot

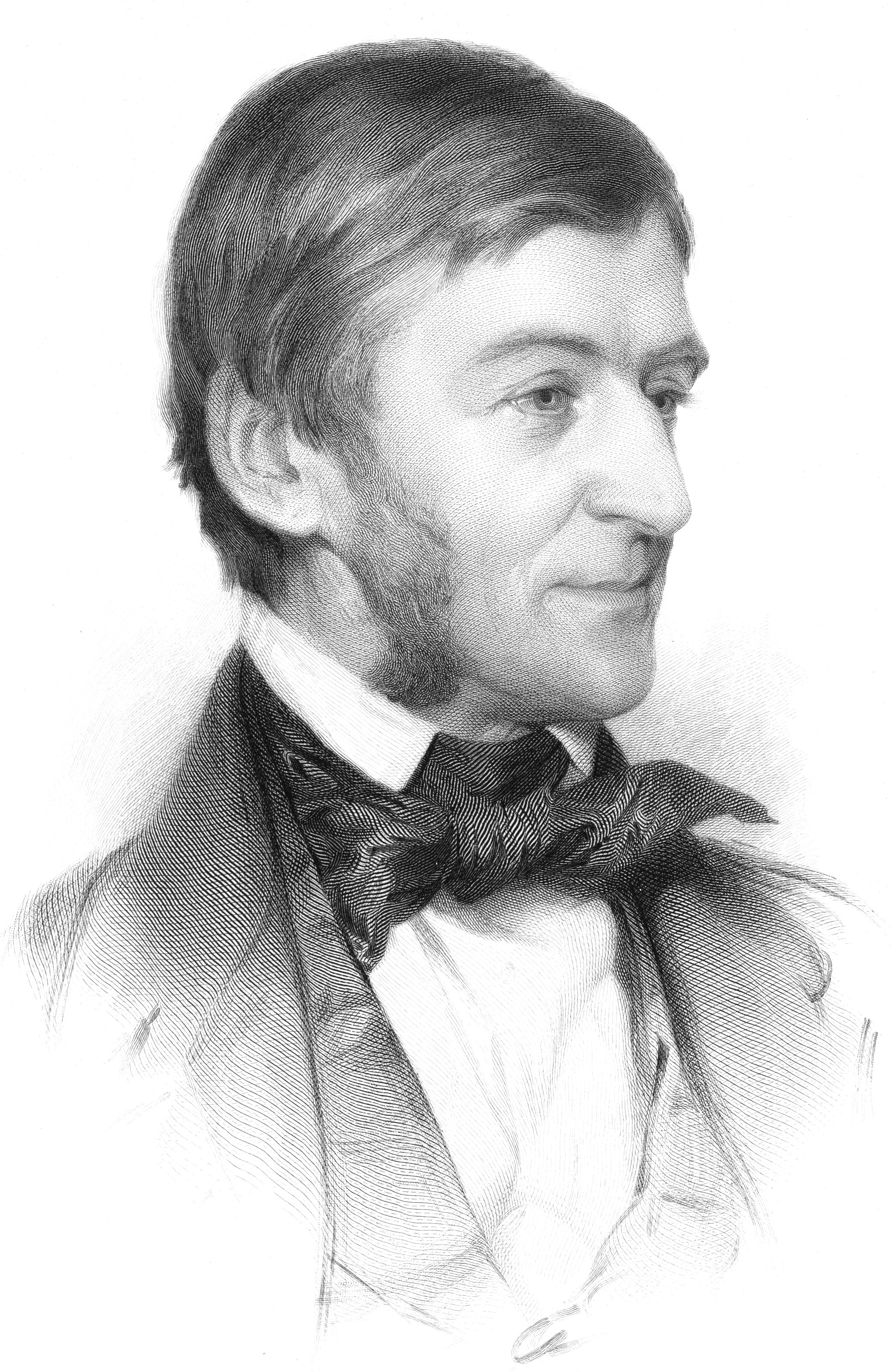
Essayist, lecturer, and poet Ralph Waldo Emerson

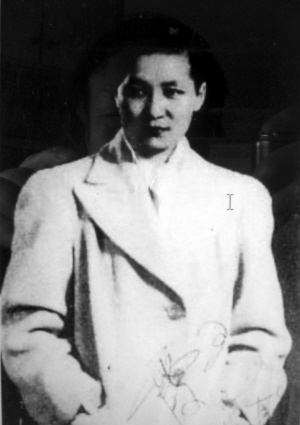
Filmmaker Esther Eng

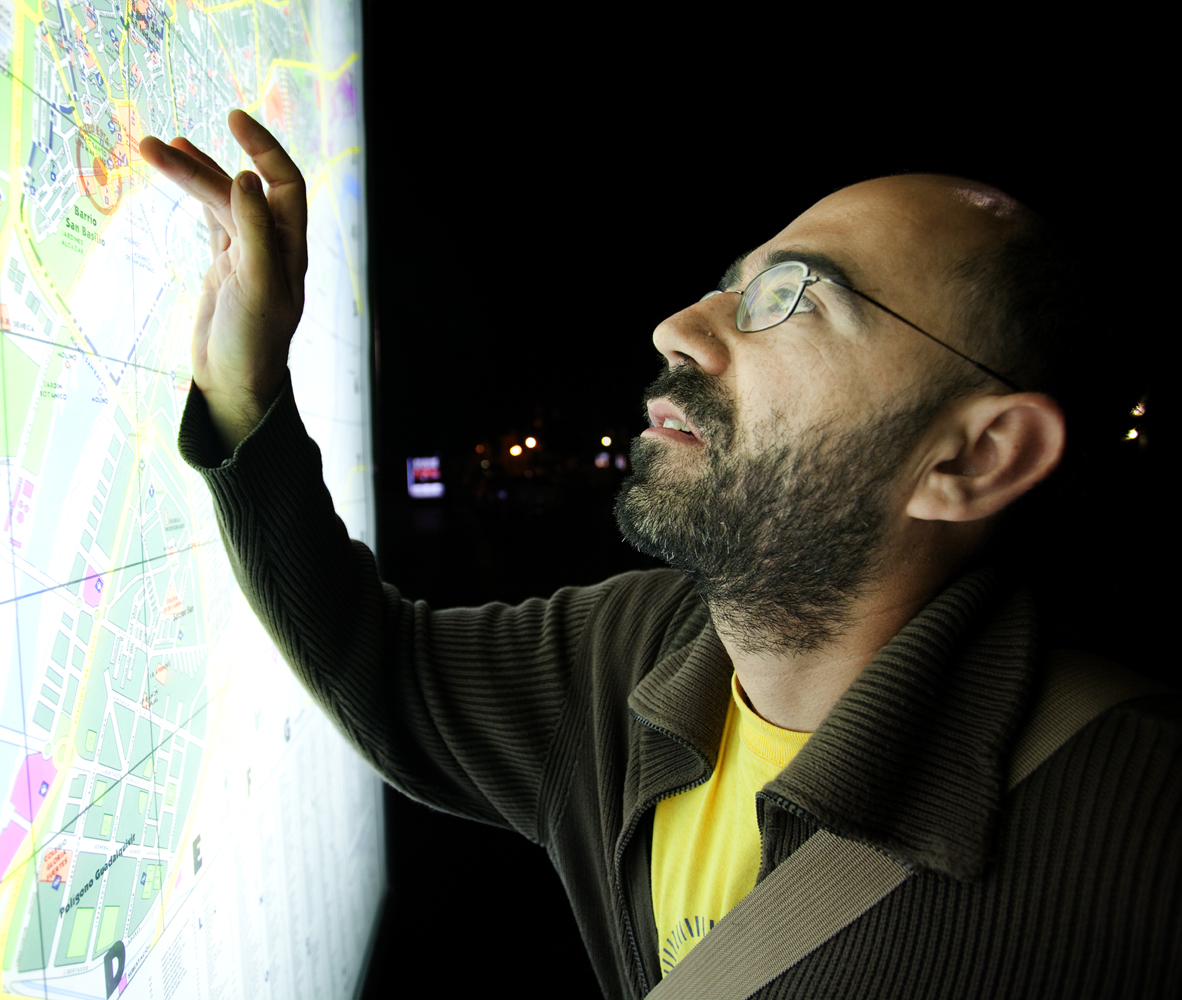
Writer Óscar Esquivias

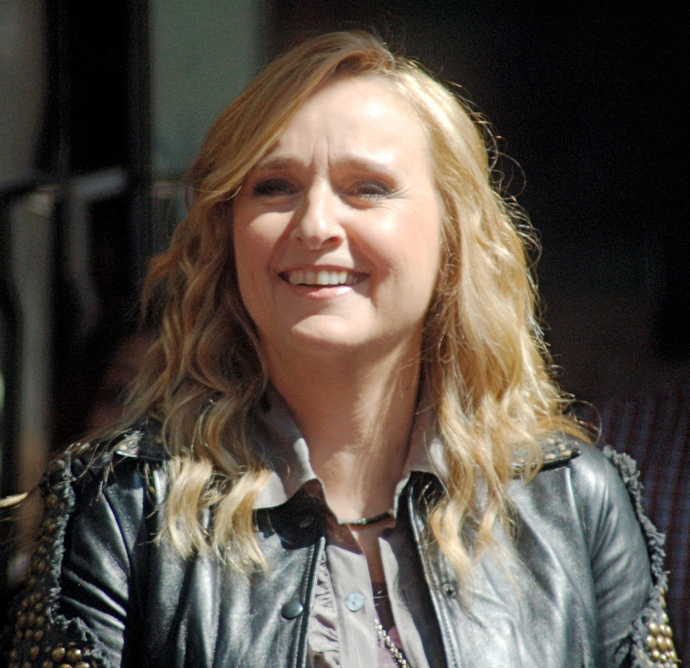
Singer Melissa Etheridge

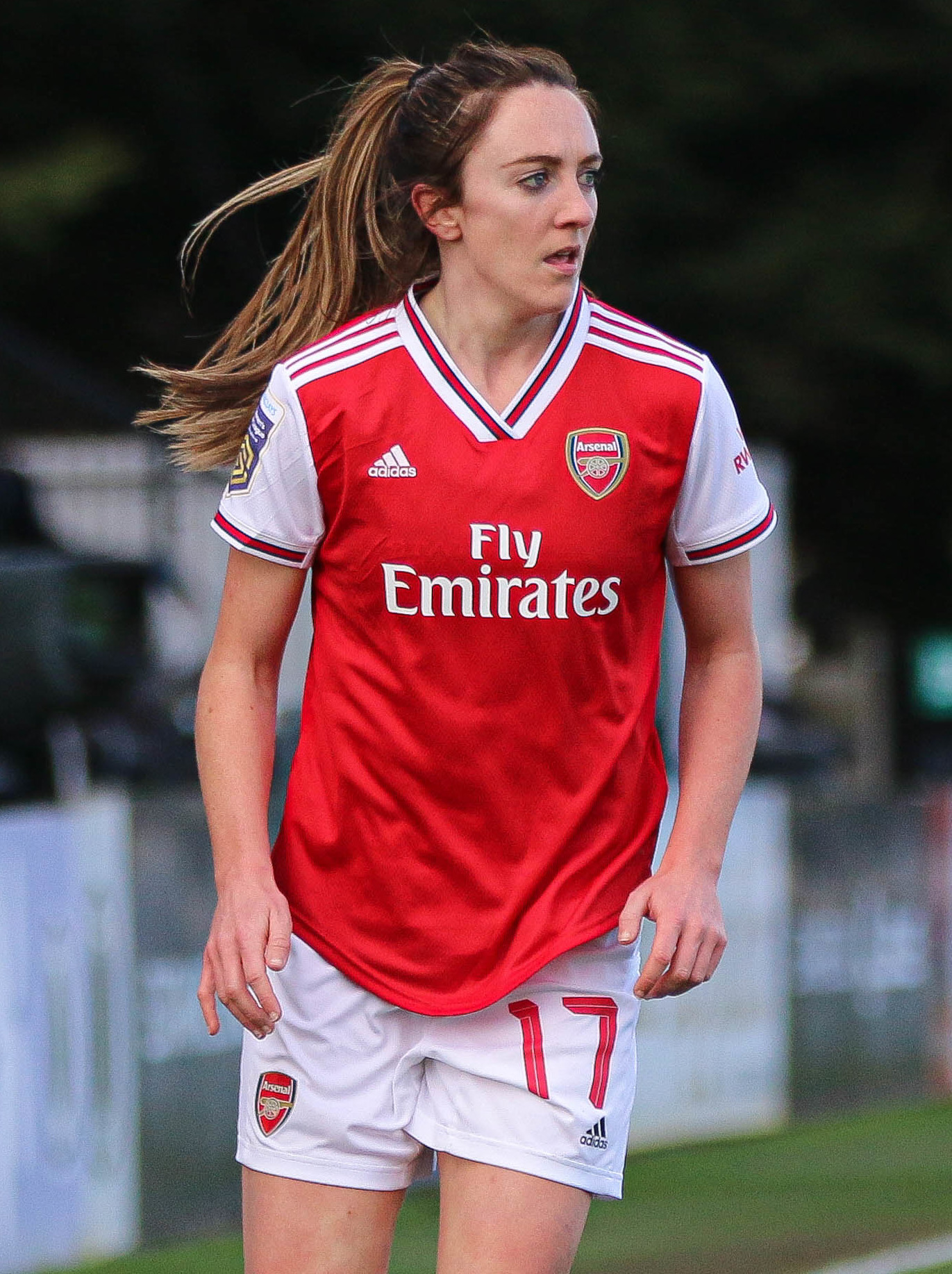
Footballer Lisa Evans

Name	Lifetime	Nationality	Notable as	Notes
Angela Eagle	b. 1961	English	Member of Parliament	L
Thomas Eakins	1844–1916	American	Painter	B
Joan Eardley	1921–1963	Scottish	Artist	L
John Early	b. 1988	American	Actor, comedian	G
Abbie Eaton	b. 1992	English	Racing driver	L
Fred Ebb	1928–2004	American	Musical theatre lyricist	G
Adam Ebbin	b. 1963	American	First openly gay Virginia delegate	G
Michael Ebeid	b. ?	Egyptian-Australia	Businessman	G
Michael Ebling	b. 1967	German	Politician	G
Diana L. Eck	b. 1945	American	Harvard Comparative Religion and Indian Studies professor	L
Ernestine Eckstein	1941–1992	American	LGBT and civil rights activist	L
FannyAnn Eddy	1974–2004	Sierra Leonean	LGBT rights activist, murder victim	L
Lee Edelman	b. 1953	American	Literary critic, academic	G
Nicholas Eden	1930–1985	English	2nd Earl of Avon, British Army officer, politician	G
Arjan Ederveen	b. 1956	Dutch	Actor, comedian, TV producer	G
Laurie Toby Edison	b. 1942	American	Photographer	B
Louis Edmonds	1923–2001	American	Actor	G
Guy Édoin	b. ?	Canadian	Film director, screenwriter	G
Chike Frankie Edozien	b. ?	Nigerian-American	Writer, journalist	G
Hilton Edwards	1903–1982	English-Irish	Actor, theater founder, producer	G
Kyra Edwards	b. 1997	English	Rower	L
Georges Eekhoud	1854–1927	Belgian	Writer	G
Effy	b. 1990	American	Professional wrestler	G
Jim Egan	1921–2000	Canadian	Activist, writer	G
Susan Eggman	b. 1961	American	Politician	L
Danielle Egnew	b. 1969	American	Musician, actor, clairvoyant	L
Paola Egonu	b. 1998	Italian	Volleyball player	L
Youri Egorov	1954–1988	Russian	Classical pianist	G
Michelle Ehlen	b. 1978	American	Actor	L
Jesse Ehrenfeld	b. 1978	American	Physician, President of the American Medical Association	G
Billy Eichner	b. 1978	American	Comedian, actor, writer	G
Jorge Eduardo Eielson	1924–2006	Peruvian	Artist, writer	G
Hannah Einbinder	b. 1995	American	Comedian, actor	B
Nicole Eisenman	b. 1965	American	Artist, professor	L
Sergei Eisenstein	1898–1948	Soviet	Film director	G
Sujitra Ekmongkolpaisarn	b. 1977	Thai	Badminton player	L
Uffe Elbæk	b. 1954	Danish	Politician, businessman, entrepreneur	G
Alber Elbaz	1961–2021	Moroccan-Israeli	Fashion designer	G
Claybourne Elder	b. 1982	American	Actor, singer, writer	G
Norman Elder	1939–2003	Canadian	Explorer, writer, artist, Olympic equestrian	G
Sean Eldridge	b. 1986	American	Investor, politician, activist	G
Andri Eleftheriou	b. 1984	Cypriot	Sports shooter	L
Beatrice Eli	b. 1987	Swedish	Musician	L
Rick Elice	b. 1956	American	Writer, stage actor	G
Martha May Eliot	1891–1978	American	Pediatrician, public health	L
Carlos Elizondo	b. ?	American	White House social secretary	G
Shlomi Elkabetz	b. 1972	Israeli	Actor, writer, director	G
Cássia Eller	1962–2001	Brazilian	Rock musician	L
Adam Elliot	b. 1972	Australian	Animator, filmmaker	G
Mark Elliot	b. 1953	Canadian	Radio host, addictions counsellor	G
Denholm Elliott	1922–1992	English	Actor	B
Drew Elliott	b. 1981	American	Global Creative Director of MAC Cosmetics	G
Peter Elliott	b. 1954	Canadian	Anglican priest	G
Stephan Elliott	b. 1964	Australian	Film director, screenwriter	G
Aunjanue Ellis	b. 1969	American	Actor, producer	B
Bret Easton Ellis	b. 1964	American	Writer	G
Dusty Ellis	1953–2012	American	Nuclear whistleblower, activist	L
Edith Ellis	1861–1916	English	Writer	B
Jason Ellis	b. 1971	Australian	Radio host, skateboarder, mixed martial arts fighter, truck racer, boxer	B
Jill Ellis	b. 1966	English-American	Soccer coach	L
Rashida Ellis	b. 1995	American	Boxer	L
Ruth Ellis	1899–2000	American	LGBT rights activist, only known African-American centenarian lesbian	L
Sarah Ellis	b. 1952	Canadian	Children's author	L
Sarah Kate Ellis	b. 1971	American	Media executive, journalist, author, CEO of GLAAD	L
Megan Ellison	b. 1986	American	Film producer	L
Angela Ellsworth	b. ?	American	Artist	L
Carmen Elmakiyes	b. 1979	Israeli	Political activist, filmmaker	L
Mable Elmore	b. ?	Canadian	Politician	L
J. McRee Elrod	1932–2016	American	Librarian, cataloger, minister	G
Robert Elsie	1950–2017	Canadian	Linguist	G
Julian Eltinge	1881–1941	American	Actor, drag performer	G
Eric Emerson	1945–1975	American	Musician	B
Max Emerson	b. 1988	American	Actor, model, author, filmmaker	G
Ralph Waldo Emerson	1803–1882	American	Writer, essayist, poet	B
Daniel Emilfork	1924–2006	Chilean-French	Actor	G
Roland Emmerich	b. 1955	German	Filmmaker	G
Magnus Enckell	1870–1925	Finnish	Painter	G
Esther Eng	1914–1970	American	Filmmaker	L
Cyrus Engerer	b. ?	Maltese	Politician	G
Selli Engler	1899–1982	German	Author, lesbian activist	L
Edward Enninful	b. 1972	Ghanaian-British	Fashion stylist, magazine editor (editor-in-chief of the British Vogue)	G
Nick Enright	1950–2003	Australian	Playwright	G
Frederick Gotthold Enslin	b. ?	American	Continental Army officer convicted of sodomy in 1778	G
Paul-Émile d'Entremont	b. ?	Canadian	Documentary filmmaker	G
Anton Enus	b. ?	South African-Australian	TV presenter	G
Epaminondas	418–362 BCE	Theban	General, statesman	G
Brian Epstein	1934–1967	English	Manager of The Beatles	G
Rob Epstein	b. 1955	American	Director, producer, writer, editor.	G
Steven Epstein	b. ?	American	Professor, sociologist	G
Lyudmila Erarskaya	1891–1964	Russian	Actor	L
Didier Eribon	b. 1953	French	Philosopher, intellectual	G
Magdalena Eriksson	b. 1993	Swedish	Footballer	L
Cynthia Erivo	b. 1987	British	Actress, singer, songwriter	B
Erté	1892–1990	Russian–French	Artist, designer	G
Guy Erwin	b. 1958	American	Lutheran bishop	G
Luis Escobar Kirkpatrick	1908–1991	Spanish	Nobleman, actor	G
Jeffrey Escoffier	1942–2022	American	Writer	G
Gloria Escomel	b. 1941	Uruguayan-Canadian	Writer	L
Jill Esmond	1908–1990	English	Actor	B
Eduardo España	b. 1971	Mexican	Actor, comedian	G
Raúl Esparza	b. 1970	American	Actor	B
Juan Pablo Espinosa	b. 1980	Colombian	Actor	G
Cameron Esposito	b. 1981	American	Comedian, actor	L
Esquerita	1935–1986	American	R&B singer-songwriter, pianist	G
Óscar Esquivias	b. 1972	Spanish	Writer	G
Jörg van Essen	b. 1947	German	Politician	G
Emily Estefan	b. 1994	American	Singer	L
Esteman	b. 1984	Colombian	Pop singer	G
Luis Estevez	c. 1930–2014	Cuban-American	Fashion designer and costume designer	B
Abelardo Estorino	1925–2013	Cuban	Dramatist, theater director, theater critic	G
Jade Esteban Estrada	b. 1975	American	Pop musician, comedian, choreographer	G
Izad Etemadi	b. ?	Canadian	Actor, playwright, comedian	Q
Melissa Etheridge	b. 1961	American	Rock musician	L
Terence Etherton	b. 1951	English	Judge	G
Asier Etxeandia	b. 1975	Spanish	Actor	G
Sijara Eubanks	b. 1985	American	Mixed martial artist	L
Wesley Eure	b. 1951	American	Actor	G
Barry Evans	1943–1997	English	Actor	B
Damon Evans	b. 1949	American	Actor	G
Daniel Evans	b. 1973	Welsh	Actor	G
Lisa Evans	b. 1992	Scottish	Footballer	L
Luke Evans	b. 1979	Welsh	Actor	G
Monique Evans	b. 1956	Brazilian	Model, actor, TV personality	L
Non Evans	b. 1974	Welsh	Rugby player, judoka, weightlifter, freestyle wrestler	L
Owain Wyn Evans	b. 1984	Welsh	Journalist, TV presenter	G
Scott Evans	b. 1983	American	Actor	G
Uzi Even	b. 1940	Israeli	Chemistry professor, politician, first openly gay member of Knesset	G
Kenny Everett	1944–1995	English	DJ, comedian	G
Ray Everett	b. 1969	American	Lawyer, businessman	G
Rupert Everett	b. 1959	English	Actor	G
Matt Evers	b. 1976	American	Figure skater	G
Edgar de Evia	1910–2003	Mexican-American	Photographer	G
Hanns Heinz Ewers	1871–1943	German	Writer	G
Mark Ewert	b. 1972	American	Writer, actor	G
Blake McIver Ewing	b. 1985	American	Actor	G
Reid Ewing	b. 1988	American	Actor, musician	G
Joe Exotic	b. 1963	American	Incarcerated criminal and former zoo operator	G
Tom Eyen	1940–1991	American	Playwright, lyricist, TV writer, theatre director	G
William Eythe	1918–1957	American	Actor	G
Alicya Eyo	b. 1975	English	Actor	L
Moses Jacob Ezekiel	1844–1917	American	Sculptor	G

== See also ==
- List of gay, lesbian or bisexual people
