= 2022 Governor General's Awards =

Canadian literary award

The shortlisted nominees for the 2022 Governor General's Awards for Literary Merit were announced on October 12, 2022, and the winners were announced on November 16.

== English ==
Category	Winner	Nominated
Fiction	Sheila Heti, Pure Colour	Shashi Bhat, The Most Precious Substance on Earth; Lisa Bird-Wilson, Probably Ruby; Brian Thomas Isaac, All the Quiet Places; Sheila Murray, Finding Edward
Non-fiction	Eli Baxter, Aki-wayn-zih: A Person as Worthy as the Earth	Rebecca Donner, All the Frequent Troubles of Our Days: The True Story of the American Woman at the Heart of the German Resistance to Hitler; Robyn Maynard and Leanne Betasamosake Simpson, Rehearsals for Living; Rowan McCandless, Persephoneʼs Children: A Life in Fragments; Britt Wray, Generation Dread: Finding Purpose in an Age of Climate Crisis
Poetry	Annick MacAskill, Shadow Blight	D. M. Bradford, Dream of No One But Myself; Anne Carson, H of H Playbook; Aaron Kreuter, Shifting Baseline Syndrome; Avery Lake, Horrible Dance
Drama	Dorothy Dittrich, The Piano Teacher: A Healing Key	Daniel Arnold, Darrell Dennis and Medina Hahn, Inheritance: a pick-the-path experience; Robert Chafe, Everybody Just C@lm the F#ck Down; Marjorie Chan, Lady Sunrise; Ho Ka Kei (Jeff Ho), Iphigenia and the Furies (On Taurian Land) & Antigone: 方
Children's literature	Jen Ferguson, The Summer of Bitter and Sweet	Deborah Ellis, Step; Joanne Levy, Sorry for Your Loss; Edeet Ravel, A Boy Is Not a Ghost; Kate Story, Urchin
Children's illustration	Naseem Hrab and Nahid Kazemi, The Sour Cherry Tree	Matthew Forsythe, Mina; Doris George, Don K. Philpot and Alyssa Koski, kā-āciwīkicik / The Move; Kyo Maclear and Gracey Zhang, The Big Bath House; Julie Morstad, Time Is a Flower
French to English translation	Judith Weisz Woodsworth, History of the Jews in Quebec (Pierre Anctil, Histoire des juifs du Québec)	Aleshia Jensen, Remnants (Céline Huyghebaert, Le drap blanc); Aleshia Jensen and Bronwyn Haslam, This Is How I Disappear (Mirion Malle, Cʼest comme ça que je disparais); Susan Ouriou, White Resin (Audrée Wilhelmy, Blanc Résine); Ben Vrignon, They Called Us Savages: A Hereditary Chiefʼs Quest for Truth and Harmony (Dominique Rankin and Marie-Josée Tardif, On nous appelait les Sauvages : souvenirs et espoirs dʼun chef héréditaire Algonquin)

== French ==
Category	Winner	Nominated
Fiction	Alain Farah, Mille secrets mille dangers	Maryse Andraos, Sans refuge; Charlotte Biron, Jardin radio; Dominique Fortier, Les ombres blanches; Larry Tremblay, Tableau final de l'amour
Non-fiction	Sylveline Bourion, La Voie romaine	Jean-François Beauchemin, La source et le roseau; Clément de Gaulejac, Tu vois ce que je veux dire? Illustrations, métaphores et autres images qui parlent; Marie-Pier Lafontaine, Armer la rage : Pour une littérature de combat; Marie-Hélène Voyer, Lʼhabitude des ruines : Le sacre de lʼoubli et de la laideur au Québec
Poetry	Maya Cousineau Mollen, Enfants du lichen	Anna Babi, Vivarium; Carole David, Le programme double de la femme tuée; Frédéric Dumont, Chambre minimum; Élise Turcotte, À mon retour
Drama	David Paquet, Le poids des fourmis	Caroline Bélisle, Les remugles, ou La danse nuptiale est une langue morte; Nadia Girard Eddahia, Disgrâce; Liliane Gougeon Moisan, L'Art de vivre; Marie-Claude Verdier, Seeker
Children's literature	Julie Champagne, Cancer ascendant Autruche	Daphné B., La Pluie des autres; Reynald Cantin, Les Bulles; Carolanne Foucher, Dessiner dans les marges et autres activités de fantôme; Marie-Hélène Jarry, Les carnets de novembre
Children's illustration	Nadine Robert and Qin Leng, Trèfle	Fanny Britt and Isabelle Arsenault, Truffe; Pierrette Dubé and Enzo, Un rhume de cheval; Orbie, La fin des poux?; Paul Tom and Mélanie Baillairgé, Seuls
English to French translation	Mélissa Verreault, Partie de chasse au petit gibier entre lâches au club de tir du coin (Megan Gail Coles, Small Game Hunting at the Local Coward Gun Club)	Sylvie Bérard and Suzanne Grenier, Le fruit de la puanteur (Larissa Lai, Salt Fish Girl); Éric Fontaine, Le malenchantement de sainte Lucy (Zsuzsi Gartner, The Beguiling); Benoit Laflamme, Dans la lugubre forêt nos corps seront suspendus (Ava Farmehri, Through the Sad Wood Our Corpses Will Hang); Catherine Leroux, Les coups de dés (Sean Michaels, The Wagers)
