= Aki-wayn-zih =

2021 memoir by Eli Baxter

Aki-wayn-zih: A Person as Worthy as the Earth
- Author: Eli Baxter
- Language: English
- Genre: Memoir
- Published: September 15, 2021
- Publisher: McGill-Queen's University Press
- Publication place: Canada
- Media type: Print: Hardcover; Digital: Kindle Edition
- Pages: 160
- Award: Governor General’s Literary Award
- ISBN: 9780228008071
- Website: mqup.ca

Aki-wayn-zih: A Person as Worthy as the Earth is a memoir written by Canadian writer Eli Baxter. Published by McGill-Queen's University Press, the book won the 2022 Governor General's Literary Award for English-language non-fiction.

== Synopsis ==
Told from an Anishinaabay point of view, Aki-wayn-zih is the story of growing up on Turtle Island, life before European contact, and early memories of trapping and fishing on traditional lands. In his book, Baxter also describes how the residential school system changed him as a person, and transformed his family, his reserve community, and others like it.

The book is divided into three parts: the first, "Anishinaabay Kih-kayn-daa-soh-win (Anishinaabay Knowledge)"; the second, "Ish-poh too-kin-nih-goh-yung (Before Contact)"; and the third, "Residential School."

== Awards ==
Aki-wayn-zih won the Governor General's Award for English-language non-fiction at the 2022 Governor General's Awards.

== Reception ==
Aki-wayn-zih was generally well received. In her review for Montreal Review of Books, Linda M. Morra writes, "These stories are elegant and simple, and therefore accessible, sometimes repeating elements that suggest both their roots in oral narration and their importance as a resource in the building and restoring of Anishinaabay Knowledges." At the 49th Shelf, David Paul Achneepineskum of the Matawa First Nations contributed, "Aki-wayn-zih will educate not only Canadians but the world as to what my people went through during this tragic part of history." The Governor General's Literary Award peer assessment committee members Will Aitken, Madhur Anand, and Jenna Butler stated, "At a time when [Baxter] worries that the fires of Indigenous languages are going out, his simple and beautiful book, written across languages, cultures, and generations, radiates a radical kind of hope.”
