= Annick MacAskill =

Canadian poet

Annick MacAskill is a Canadian poet from London, Ontario who won the Governor General's Award for English-language poetry at the 2022 Governor General's Awards for her collection Shadow Blight.

Born in London, Ontario, and a Ph.D. graduate of the University of Western Ontario, she is an assistant professor in the Department of Languages and Cultures at Saint Mary's University. She has published two prior poetry collections, No Meeting Without Body (2018) and Murmurations (2020).

Shadow Blight was shortlisted for the 2023 Pat Lowther Award.
