= Sheila Murray =

Canadian writer

Sheila Murray is a Canadian writer. Her debut novel Finding Edward was published in 2022, and was a shortlisted finalist for the Governor General's Award for English-language fiction at the 2022 Governor General's Awards.

Finding Edward centres on Cyril Rowntree, a young mixed-race man from Jamaica who moves to Toronto as an international student, and connects with Edward Davina, an isolated elderly man whose life followed a similar path. It was published in July 2022 by Cormorant Books.

The novel was also a finalist for the 2023 Toronto Book Awards.

== Personal life ==
Murray was born in St Albans, England, and emigrated to Canada with her family as a teenager. She is based in Hamilton, Ontario, where she coordinates a climate change activist project. She has also published short fiction in various Canadian literary magazines.
