= Charlotte Biron =

Canadian writer and teacher

Charlotte Biron (born 1990) is a Canadian writer from Montreal, Quebec, whose debut novel Jardin radio was a shortlisted finalist for the Governor General's Award for French-language fiction at the 2022 Governor General's Awards.

The novel is a semi-autobiographical work inspired by her experiences recuperating in the hospital from jaw surgery, centred in particular on the times when she was alone in her hospital room with only voices on the radio to keep her company.

She holds doctorate degrees from Université Laval and Paul Valéry University Montpellier 3.

In 2023, the novel was named the winner of the Prix du CALQ – Œuvre de la relève à Montréal from the Conseil des arts et des lettres du Québec.
