= Shadow Blight =

Book by Annick MacAskill

- Author: Annick MacAskill
- Language: English
- Genre: Poetry
- Publisher: Gaspereau Press
- Publication date: June 1, 2022
- Publication place: Canada
- Media type: Print (paperback)
- Pages: 64
- Award: Governor General's Literary Award
- ISBN: 9781554472383
- Preceded by: Murmurations
- Website: annickmacaskill.com

Shadow Blight is a book written by Canadian poet Annick MacAskill from Halifax, Nova Scotia. It is her third collection of poetry and was published in June 2022 by Gaspereau Press. The book is the winner of the 2022 Governor General's Literary Award for English-language poetry.

== Synopsis ==
Shadow Blight is an experience of loss and, through poetry, a means of conveying something that would otherwise be too difficult to express. This collection addresses the sensation of being overwhelmed by grief and silenced by the outside world by drawing on the stories of Niobe, whose immense suffering over the death of her children essentially turned her and others to stone.

== Awards ==
Shadow Blight won the Governor General's Literary Award for English-language poetry at the 2022 Governor General's Awards.

It was shortlisted for the 2023 Pat Lowther Award.

== Reception ==
The book was generally well received. Melanie Brannagan Frederiksen writes in the Winnipeg Free Press, "MacAskill’s resonant use of image and language in both accounts of grief, the mythical and the modern, establishes a plane on which the stories refract one another." In the Ampersand Review, Jacob Alvarado expresses, "Shadow Blight ultimately succeeds on its ability to show its readers its pain and to teach them how to find beauty within it". The Governor General's Literary Award peer assessment committee members Joe Denham and Stewart Donovan stated, “This rare achievement combines formal poetic mastery with honesty and vulnerability.”
