= Maryse Andraos =

Canadian writer

- Born: 1988 (age 37–38) Saint-Bruno-de-Montarville, Quebec, Canada
- Occupation: Writer
- Language: French
- Education: Université du Québec à Montréal
- Notable works: Sans refuge
- Notable awards: Shortlisted, Governor General's Award for French-language fiction (2022)

Maryse Andraos (born 1988) is a Canadian writer from Saint-Bruno-de-Montarville, Quebec, whose debut novel Sans refuge was shortlisted for the Governor General's Award for French-language fiction at the 2022 Governor General's Awards.

The daughter of an Egyptian father and a québécoise mother, she was educated at the Université du Québec à Montréal. The novel is an expansion of her earlier short story of the same name, which was the winner of Ici Radio-Canada's annual short story prize in 2018.
