= Megan Gail Coles =

Canadian writer

Megan Gail Coles is a Canadian writer in Newfoundland and Labrador.

She was born in Savage Cove and grew up there. Coles was educated at Memorial University of Newfoundland and at the National Theatre School of Canada. She was co-founder and artistic director of Poverty Cove Theatre Company. She is executive director for Riddle Fence and has been writer-in-residence at the Arts and Culture Centre in St. John's.

Her short story collection Eating Habits of the Chronically Lonesome received a ReLit Award, a Winterset Award and the Margaret and John Savage First Book Award. She has written several plays, including Our Eliza, The Battery, Bound, Falling Trees, Grace and Squawk. In 2013, she received the Rhonda Payne Theatre Award.

Her debut novel, Small Game Hunting at the Local Coward Gun Club, was published in 2019. It won the 2019 Winterset Award, and was shortlisted for the 2019 Giller Prize. The novel was subsequently selected for the 2020 edition of Canada Reads, in which it was defended by Alayna Fender. At the 2022 Governor General's Awards, Mélissa Verreault won the Governor General's Award for English to French translation for the novel's French-language edition, Partie de chasse au petit gibier entre lâches au club de tir du coin.
