= Mélissa Verreault =

Canadian writer

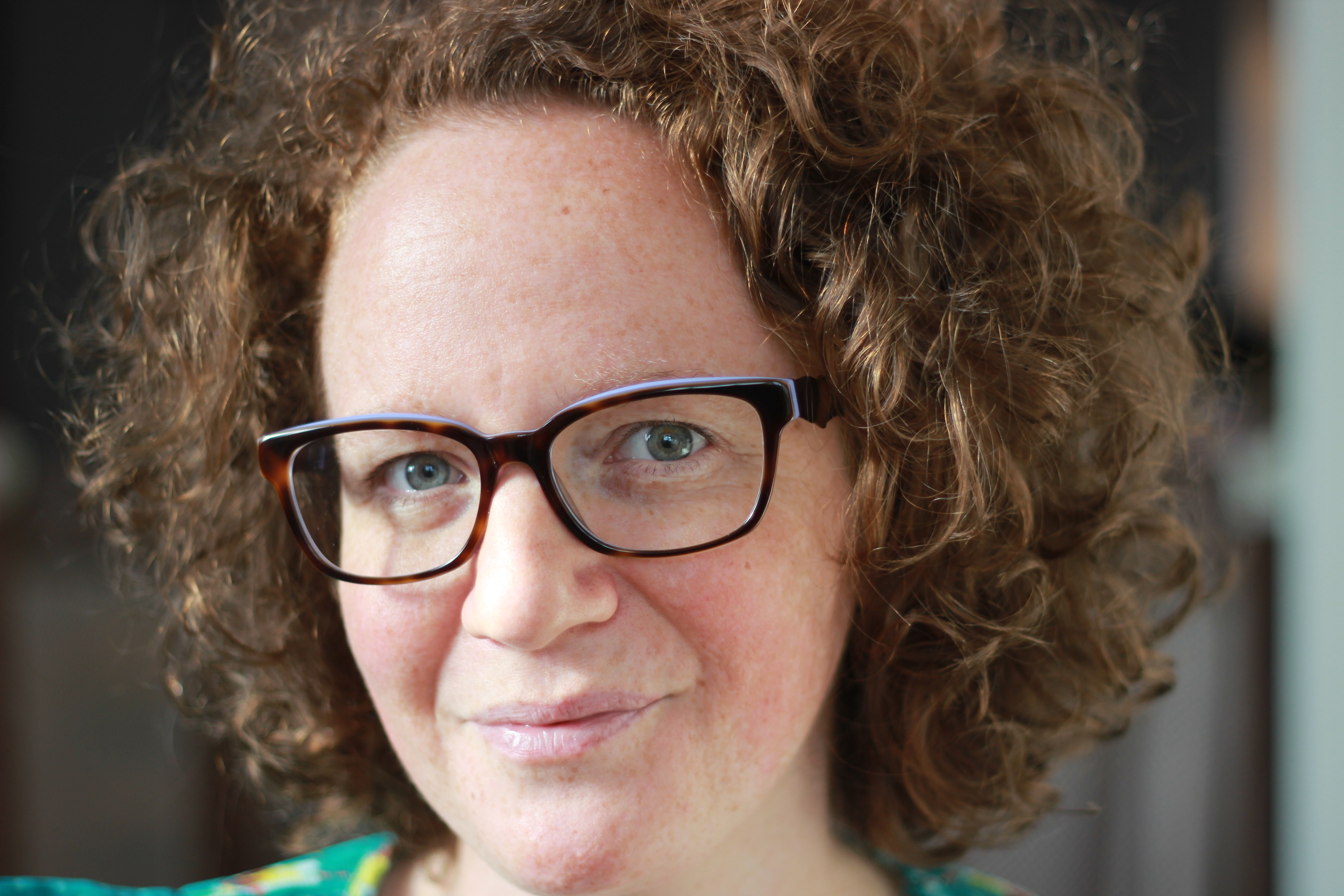
- Born: 1983 (age 42–43); Montreal, Quebec, Canada
- Occupations: novelist, translator
- Writing career
- Period: 2010s-present

Mélissa Verreault (born 1983) is a Canadian writer and translator from Montreal, Quebec. She is most noted as the winner of the Governor General's Award for English to French translation at the 2022 Governor General's Awards for Partie de chasse au petit gibier entre lâches au club de tir du coin, her translation of Megan Gail Coles's novel Small Game Hunting at the Local Coward Gun Club.

She was a finalist for the Prix des libraires du Québec in 2015 for her novel L'angoisse du Poisson rouge. It has been translated to English in 2017 under the title Behind the Eyes We Meet.

== Works ==
=== Novels ===
- Voyage léger, 2011 — ISBN 978-2-923530-28-4
- L'angoisse du poisson rouge, 2014 — ISBN 9782923530826, 9782923530895, 9782923530888
- Les couleurs primaires 2016 — ISBN 9782278080946
- Les voies de la disparition, 2016 — ISBN 9782924519288

=== Short story collections ===
- Point d'équilibre, 2012 — ISBN 9782923530482, 9782923530574, 9782923530567

=== Translations ===
- Ligne brisée (Katherena Vermette, The Break), 2017 — ISBN 9782764434161, 9782764434178, 9782764434185
- Liminal (Jordan Tannahill), 2019 — ISBN 9782924898369, 9782924898482, 9782924898437
- Partie de chasse au petit gibier entre lâches au club de tir du coin (Megan Gail Coles, Small Game Hunting at the Local Coward Gun Club), 2021 — ISBN 9782764444016, 276444401X
- Ta gueule t'es belle (Téa Mutonji, Shut Up You're Pretty), 2021 — ISBN 9782925035480, 2925035485
