= The Piano Teacher: A Healing Key =

Play by Dorothy Dittrich

- Cover of paperback book
- Original language: English
- Written by: Dorothy Dittrich
- Characters: Erin; Elaine; Tom
- Subject: Loss, love, friendship, power of music
- Genre: Drama
- Setting: Piano studio

Premiere
- Date: April 20, 2017
- Place: Arts Club Theatre
- Directed by: Yvette Nolan
- The Piano Teacher

The Piano Teacher: A Healing Key is a play written by Canadian playwright Dorothy Dittrich. It is the winner of the 2022 Governor General's Literary Award for English-language drama. The play is available in paperback and was published by Talonbooks on September 6, 2022.

== Plot ==
Erin, a celebrated classical pianist, has been unable to play since the tragic deaths of her husband and son. For two years, she has been unable to touch the piano or even sit on its bench. She meets Elaine, a piano teacher who gently reacquaints her with the piano and provides her with new hope for the challenges that life will offer. With the help of Tom, who is there to renovate, a relationship quickly ensues. Elaine, too, begins to question herself as to why she is now teaching instead of playing.

== Cast and production ==
The Piano Teacher was commissioned by the Arts Club Theatre Company as part of its Silver Commissions Project. It premiered on the Goldcorp Stage at the BMO Theatre Centre in Vancouver, British Columbia, on April 20, 2017, and played until May 14, 2017.

=== Characters and cast ===
- Erin: Caitriona Murphy
- Elaine: Megan Leitch
- Tom: Kamyar Pazandeh

=== Creative and production team ===
- Rachel Ditor – Dramaturg
- Allison Spearin – Stage Manager
- Yvette Nolan – Director
- Kyla Gardiner – Lighting Designer
- David Roberts – Set Designer
- Jenifer Darbellay – Costumer Designer
- Patrick Pennefather – Sound Designer
- Sandra Drag – Apprentice Stage Manager

== Awards ==
In 2017, The Piano Teacher won the Jessie Richardson Theatre Award for outstanding original script. In 2022, it received the Governor General's Award for English-language drama at the 2022 Governor General's Awards.

== Reception ==
The Piano Teacher has generally been well received. In The Georgia Straight, Kathleen Oliver called the play "a beautiful meditation on grief, loss, and the healing power of music." She further added, "Dittrich’s unadorned dialogue is refreshingly direct: the characters speak and listen intently to one another, usually without subtext." Theatre reviewer Jo Ledingham saw the play as "a beautiful, intelligent exploration of the power of music and friendship." She also declared, "I was moved by it and loved almost every minute."
