= Eli Baxter =

Canadian writer

Eli Baxter (born 1954) is a Canadian writer, who won the Governor General's Award for English-language non-fiction at the 2022 Governor General's Awards for his memoir Aki-wayn-zih: A Person as Worthy as the Earth.

Baxter, an Anishinaabe member of the Marten Falls First Nation and a survivor of the Canadian Indian residential school system, he has taught indigenous language and culture at both the elementary school and university levels, most notably at the University of Western Ontario.
