= Dorothy Dittrich =

Canadian playwright

- Citizenship: Canadian
- Occupations: Playwright and musical theatre director

Dorothy Dittrich is a Canadian playwright and musical theatre director and composer from Vancouver, British Columbia, who won the Governor General's Award for English-language drama at the 2022 Governor General's Awards for her play The Piano Teacher: A Healing Key.

Prior to its print publication in 2022, The Piano Teacher had its theatrical premiere at Vancouver's Arts Club Theatre in 2017, and won the Jessie Richardson Theatre Award for outstanding original script that year.

Her other plays have included When We Were Singing, The Dissociates and Lesser Demons. She has also released Short Stories, an album of original piano compositions which was produced by June Millington.

Dittrich is out as lesbian, and wrote The Dissociates during a writers' residency at Buddies in Bad Times.
