= Steve Devonas =

Swiss film and television actor

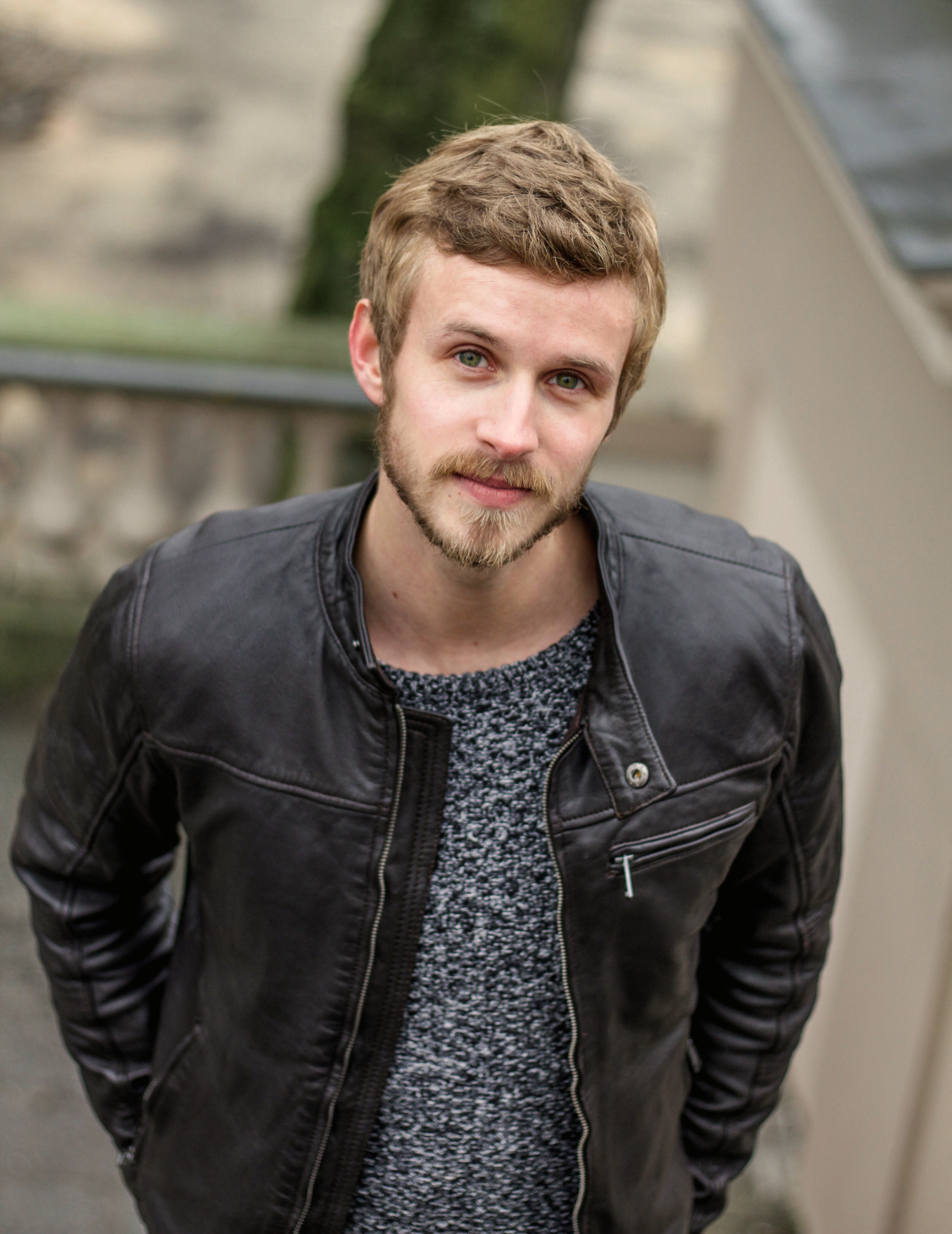
- Devonas in February 2016
- Born: Steve Reber; 12 June 1989 (age 36); Switzerland
- Occupation: Actor
- Years active: 2008–present

Steve Devonas (né Reber, born 12 June 1989) is a Swiss film and television actor.

== Biography ==
Born in Switzerland, he completed his education at the European Film Actor School in Zurich. Devonas changed his surname in 2011 from Reber to Devonas, which is the surname of his late grandmother, who was from Grisons.

Devonas breakthrough role came in August 2010, in a children's television series (Best Friends) of the Schweizer Fernsehen (Swiss Television), and made his film debut role in the 2015 Giacun Caduff Swiss production 20 Regeln für Sylvie.

Devonas moved to Berlin, Germany, soon afterward to pursue his acting career. In February 2021, he came out as gay.

Devonas' father died in April 2019, and he considers his older brother to be his life role model. He said that his parents were divided in supporting his acting career, with his mother being somehow reluctant, while his father openly supported him.

He has reported suffering from acrophobia and enjoys his time in sports and music.

== Selected filmography ==
Year	Title	Notes
2008	Sommerwette	Short film. First acting role
2010	Best Friends	Children's TV series. Breakthrough role
2015	20 Regeln für Sylvie	First acting role in a film
2019	Gute Zeiten, schlechte Zeiten	TV series
