= Caregiving by country =

Caregiving by country is the regional variation of caregiving practices as distinguished among countries.

== Caregivers internationally ==
=== Australia ===
According to the Australian Bureau of Statistics 2001 paper on the health and well-being of Carers, Carers save the Australian Federal Government over $30 billion a year, according to the same statistics there are over 300 000 Young Carers (Carers Australia states that a Young carer is any carer under the age of 25) with 1.5 million potential young carers, where potential is defined as a young person who lives in a household where there is at least one person who requires full-time care (Is disabled etc.). In 2015, carers provided around 1.9 billion hours of unpaid care. According to a new study by the University of Queensland, Australian carers are providing $13.2 billion worth of free mental health support to their friends and family members. This "hidden workforce" is an equivalent of 173,000 full-time mental health support workers.

In Australia they also have The Australian National Young Carers Action Team (ANYCAT) whose goal is to advocate on behalf of young carers (Being young carers themselves) each board member is the sole representative of their state or territory and represent as few as 75 000 Young Carers. In Most states and Territories they have an ANYCAT equivalent team or Board. In Queensland this is called Young Carers Action Board Queensland (YCABQ).

=== Canada ===
Caregiving in Canada involves providing essential care services, including personal support, companionship, and medical aid, to help individuals maintain their independence and quality of life. It is carried out by trained healthcare assistants and volunteers. Historically, caregiving was an accessible job for many, requiring minimal formal education and offering flexible entry points. However, it has transitioned from being an easily accessible occupation to one that now requires more certifications. Traditionally, no specific educational qualifications were necessary to enter this field. Organizations and private agencies provided brief training, often just a few weeks long, enabling high school graduates or nursing students to take up caregiving roles as a means of earning money and gaining experience.

The industry, however, experienced significant changes when provincial educational institutions commercialized caregiving programs, making their lengthy qualifications mandatory. This shift primarily targeted international students, as caregiving became a pathway for them to transition from temporary to permanent residency in Canada, which is comparatively easier than other immigration streams. In 2025, Canada plans to grant permanent residency to temporary residents already engaged in caregiving and to new arrivals under this category, reflecting the changing demand and the need for updated regulations in the caregiving sector as well as labor management strategies.

=== Chile ===
Over a million people in Chile are involved in caregiving work. In 2026, the law called "Chile Takes Care" (Spanish: Chile Cuida) went into effect, creating a National System of Support and Care meant to gurantee rights both to those dependent on carers and carers themselves.

A 2023–2025 study by the Millennium Institute for Care Research characterized the caregiver population in Chile as being 76.3% female in the care for the elderly and 93.3% female in the care for peopple with intellectual and/or developmental disabilities.

=== China ===
According to the National Bureau of Statistics of China 2011 report regarding China's total population and structural changes, people belong to the age group of 60 years and above accounted for 184.99 million, which occupied 13.7 percent of the total national population at the end of 2011. The number has risen 0.47 percentage point comparing to the year of 2010. Of these, people age 65 years and above figured up 122.88 million that occupied 9.1 percent of the total and has increased 0.25 percentage points.

As a steadily increasing older population with a growing demand for long-term care, an issue of lacking of elderly care facilities as well as inadequate training for skilled caregivers has generated a social concern pertaining to elder care. According to the official Chinese media Xinhua, professionally qualified caregivers are in great request with approximately 10 million people needed to provide care for the Chinese aging population. However, the report also stated that only 300,000 people currently working as caregivers with less than 1/3 of them are trained properly.

There is no organized caregiver association in China. As a result, family members still construct the major source of caregiving in China especially in rural area where the quality of health services is a problem. A recent study aims to examine the effect of depression on family members of whom sons and daughters-in-law carry out main responsibilities in caring for elderly parents have indicated several findings, including:

- The majority of caregivers choose to rely on medical resources (physicians and traditional healers) during the caregiving for older people.
- The depression score varied significantly between caregivers of healthy and non-healthy older adults.
- The severity of depressive expression associated with background of caregiving, like caregiver's income, age, and the time spent on caregiving.
- Social support plays an important role in impacting the status of depression among family caregivers.

More recently, another Caregiver Reaction Assessment was conducted in China with a purpose to analyze the reliability and validity among family caregivers of cancer patients. The study recruited 400 participants from the Second Affiliated Hospital of China Medical University in Shenyang with 312 family caregivers completed the survey. This study tried to measure caregiving experience from five aspects: disrupted schedule, financial problems, lack of family support, health problems, and self-esteem. The results indicated that the Chinese version of caregiving is profoundly influenced by the conception of Confucianism that emphasizes filial piety and guides the traditional caregiving ideology. Furthermore, the average age of adult children provide care is 46 years old of whom the majorities still work to support the family. As such, adult children sometimes bear significant physical and mental strain when their personal schedule and life activities are negatively impacted.

=== Germany ===
Caregivers in Germany assist individuals with disabilities or sick or elderly individuals with emotional support, health monitoring and daily living activities.

=== Israel ===
In Israel, one of the most significant challenges regarding caring is coping with the increasing number of dementia patients. The illness is Israel's second leading cause of disability among the elderly aged 70+ and is considered one of the most distressing and difficult conditions for the patients and their families. Due to its extensive implications, dementia is a challenge for the health and social service systems and its economic impact on society is considerable. In 2013, Israel adopted a National Strategic Plan to Address Alzheimer's and Other Types of Dementia, which emphasized the need to relate specifically to the needs of family caregivers of elderly dementia patients – in other words to treat them as a target population of the service system in their own right.

=== Italy ===
When compared to all other countries Italy has the highest percentage of residents who are age 65 and older. The life expectancy for males is 76.7 and 82.9 for females, and it is predicted that by 2050 these numbers will reach 81 and 86 years, for men and women respectively. In addition, the country is faced with a rapidly growing older population and a shortage of younger individuals. Furthermore, the Minister of Labor and Social Policies of Italy stated that the family plays the most important role in the quality of life of elders, and it is the primary care provider for the older populations; however, the government also provides assistance to the family care giver by the following services:

- "Qualified assistance at home"
- "Support services"
- "Service vouchers"
- "Daytime centres to provide support for families by offering old people rehabilitation and recreation"
- "Stays in holiday resorts for non self-sufficient old people - including those staying in hospitals or homes"

The family plays an important role in providing care to its older parents but many children still have to work so that they can survive financially and as a result many caregivers are immigrant workers. These immigrant workers come in search of work from many parts of the world such as Moldavia, the Philippines, and Peru; however, the largest population of immigrant workers come from Ukraine. Many of the caregivers work long hours and weeks, and also leave their own families behind and send them the money they make.

=== Japan ===
In Japan, a country with an aging population, caregivers assist sick or elderly individuals or individuals with disabilities with mobility, personal hygiene, daily living activities and health monitoring in private homes and nursing facility. In 2022, around 29% of the population of the country was aged 65 and older. Japan is a country with a low birth rate and longevity for its citizens. In Japan, employees may take family care leave for up to 93 days per family member, which can be divided into as many as three periods. From 1 April 2025, employers in Japan have been required to provide information about long-term-care leave and work–care support measures to employees before they face care responsibilities (such as when they reach 40), and to individually explain these systems and confirm employees’ intentions when a worker reports caregiving responsibilities. The Cabinet Office reported that about 106,000 people left employment between October 2021 and September 2022 citing family caregiving or nursing; about 80,000 (75.3%) were women. In the 2025 Comprehensive Survey of Living Conditions, 37.1% of co-resident pairs of a person certified as needing support or care and their principal caregiver were both aged 75 or older, up from 35.7% in 2022.

=== Taiwan ===
Taiwan Today reports that currently in Taiwan only 72,000 seniors, about one third of those receiving long-term care, live in nursing institutes. The rest are taken care of by family members. Chen indicates that there were 600,000 family caregivers in Taiwan and they spent an average of 13.55 hours a day caregiving. 80 percent of these 600,000 family caregivers encountered limitations on social activities. 70 percent of them needed to take care of patients even when they did not feel well. He also mentions that 80 percent of family caregivers are women, and 50 percent of them are over 50 years old. Women are more likely to be regarded as natural caregivers because of gender expectations. Taiwanese females take care of children and spouses with chronicle illnesses to meet social norms and maintain filial piety. Among the family caregivers in Taiwan, some of them experience guilt, depression, nervousness, and injuries, sleeplessness, and hopelessness. Thus, it is a very essential task to promote the capabilities of family caregivers and improve their life quality.

=== Ukraine ===
The average life expectancy in Ukraine is 61 for men and 72 for women, and as of 2005 Ukraine's population is about 48 million of whom 15% are 65 and older. Older adults who cannot take care of themselves rely on family members, humanitarian organizations, government programs, or a combination of the three sources. According to the United Nations the Ukrainian Institute of Gerontology completed a study in 1998 which included 8,574 adults of retirement age, and the results demonstrated that older adults rely on older spouses, relatives or others, and departments of community social centers for care. In addition, 10 percent of the participants had an agreement with their caregiver(s) to trade inheritance of their property for the care that they were receiving. The United Nations also describes the very underfunded and understaffed situation of the country, which has effected the quality of services available to elders. For example, they mention that some 38,000 social workers provide care to about 500,000 older adults in need, and a total of 631 community centers and 131 social welfare units are available to provide support for the older population throughout the country. In addition to limited government and local resources many of those who could be caregivers to family members or others in the community choose to migrate to Italy.

The declining standards of living, economy, and production in the country of Ukraine could be contributing to the migration of Ukrainians to Italy and other countries abroad. It is estimated that there are close to 700,000 undocumented and approximately 195,000 legal working Ukrainian immigrants in Italy and a majority of them work as caregivers. Fedyuk mentions that many of those who move to Italy do not speak the language, work unregulated hours, may be underpaid, and usually are not prepared for all the physical and psychological requirements of being a caregiver. For instance, Fedyuk describes the working requirements of a 51-year-old caregiver who only had a 2-hour break during a single day and one day off a week. Also, there is mention of a 49-year-old woman who arrived to her new job and was not told the "granny" she would be caring for had an amputated arm and leg, was blind and could not speak. Those who migrate to Italy usually leave behind families and parents who require care themselves, and this puts further stress and pressure on the individual. Further research should be done in order to examine the extent of the consequences that may result to the caregiver, receiver of care, and those who are left behind in the cases of migrant Ukrainian workers.

=== United Kingdom ===
According to Carers UK, and based on the 2001 census around six million people in the UK provide care on an unpaid basis for a relative, friend or neighbour in need of support due to old age, disability, frailty or illness. The population of carers is dynamic: at least a third of all people will fulfil a caring role at some point in their lives. In 2022 Carers UK estimated there were 10.58 million carers.

Research has shown that becoming a carer can have many impacts on a person's life. These include financial costs, exclusion and discrimination at work, social isolation and poor health through stress and physical injury. Caregivers may miss opportunities to establish families of their own so, later in life, having no carers of their own. The UK charity, Ageing Without Children, has been set up to advocate for this growing group of people.

At least half of all carers are in full or part-time employment and some care for more than one person. Carers save the UK economy an estimated £87bn a year, and economic considerations form a key element in government policy to support carers. The 2001 Census indicated that there are 175,000 young carers aged under 18 in the UK today. A poll commissioned by The Princess Royal Trust for Carers in 2004 indicates that the number of young carers could be much higher. According to Age UK carers over the age of 80, (30% of people aged 80 and over) provide 23 million hours of unpaid care a week.

The Care Act 2014 recognises the needs of informal carers and legislates for assessment, care and support for those in an unpaid caring role, even if the person they care for does not receive local authority services.

In 2026 Andy Burnham proposed that a National Care Service would be established in the next parliament. It would be introduced in phases, and will be guided by the report of Louise Casey.

==== Scotland ====
Policy and legislation in relation to caregivers living in Scotland is somewhat different from that in England, Wales and Ireland. Carers are defined by the Scottish Census as being "individuals who look after, or give any help or support to family members, friends, neighbours and others because of long-term physical or mental ill health or disability or problems related to old age" (Scotland's Census Results Online [SCROL]). Estimates from the 2001 census put the numbers of carers in Scotland at 481,579. Of these, 175,969 are reported to provide more than 20 hours of care a week, and 24% provide more than 50 hours of care.

Carers who provide care for 20 hours a week or more are regarded as being at the 'heavy end' of caring (Parker 1990). This assumes that they are the most involved carers, providing both personal and physical care, resulting in high levels of stress and most in need of support services. Many of these carers continue to provide care without support from social work or health services and because of this they remain hidden or invisible (Scottish Executive 2006, Cavaye 2006).

Carers are viewed by the government as an important resource and in recent years have been given increasing recognition in health and social care policy. Since devolution in 1999 legislation and policy for caregivers has been developed by the former Scottish Executive (now Scottish Government).

Carers in Scotland are regarded as 'partners' in the provision of care. As a result, support services provided to carers are regarded as part of the overall package of care to the person being looked after. This means that carers are not seen as service users and are therefore not responsible for the cost of any service provided. The exception to this is when a carer is looking after their partner; in that situation their income may be taken into account during a financial assessment.

This situation is different from that which exists in England where carers are viewed as services users in their own right and as such are liable for the cost of services provided. Yet, in many cases, it is not the carer who actually needs the service; it is the person being cared for who needs it because of their illness or disability.

=== United States ===
President Joe Biden speaking on a video call with Susie, a caregiver from Texas, in April 2021

According to a November, 2007 survey on family caregiving, most family caregivers feel more positive about their experiences than they did just before they took on the responsibility, with significant differences in expectation prior to becoming a caregiver and the actual experience.

The survey also found that caregivers are often burdened by high out-of-pocket costs in caring for a spouse or parent, but:

- Sixty percent of the caregivers called the experience "very or extremely rewarding," a 50% jump over the number of caregivers who thought in advance they would find the experience "very or extremely rewarding." Nearly 80% (78.8%) percent of the caregivers found the experience to be at least "rewarding," an increase of more than one-third from initial expectation.
- A majority of the caregivers-nearly 54%-formed a stronger bond with the patient during the time they were together.
- Almost 60% of the respondents reported an improvement in the quality of their relationship with the person for whom they cared. By contrast, fewer than 10% said that their relationship got worse during the time they were caregivers.
- Social activities of the caregiver tend to diminish. The diminished social activities are replaced with an increased quality of relationship with the care recipient.
- More than 2/3 of all caregivers (68.7%) said they enjoy the tasks associated with caregiving. Prior to assuming the role, fewer than half (45.5%) thought they would enjoy caregiving.
- The amount of satisfaction with caregiving is directly related to the type of disease of the care recipient. Caregivers of people with depression, cancer, or cardiac disease have more difficulty than those caring for patients who have diabetes, high blood pressure and arthritis.

According to the Caregiver statistics fact sheet (2012) 43.5 million of adult family caregivers care for someone 50+ years of age and 14.9 million care for someone who has Alzheimer's disease or other dementia [Alzheimer's Association, 2011 Alzheimer's Disease Facts and Figures, Alzheimer's & Dementia, Vol. 7, Issue 2]. The number of male caregivers may be increasing and will continue to do so due to a variety of social demographic factors [Kramer, B. J. & E. H. Thompson, (eds.), "Men as Caregivers," (New York:Prometheus Books, 2002]. Retrieved from.

Dellman-Jenkins, Blankemeyer and Pinkard found that young adults are increasingly becoming caregivers to their elderly relatives because of economic factors. A new population of caregivers to elderly are children and grandchildren, aged 40 years and younger, serving as the major source of support to an older relative(s). Retrieved from

Other information about US caregivers: By 2009, more than 61.6 million people provided unpaid care for a chronically ill, disabled or aged family member or friend at an estimated value of $450 billion.

1.4 million children ages 8 to 18 provide care for an adult relative; 72% are caring for a parent or grandparent, although most are not the sole caregiver.

30% of family caregivers caring for older individuals are themselves aged 65 or over; another 15% are between the ages of 45 and 54.

Licensing and certification for caregiving can vary by state. In some states, the only licensing needed is by the company that employs the caregivers (unless it is from the state). In other states, an online certification course is recommended. Some states require in-classroom certification, and others require personal care licensing, which can be applied for online. Along with that, in some states, further certifications are required such as CPR training and first aid training.

Some US states, such as California, have set out the responsibilities of the primary caregiver.

== Organizations ==
On February 27, 2004, the International Alliance of Carers Organizations (IACO) was launched by family caregiving organizations from Australia, the UK, Sweden, the Netherlands, and the U.S. The mission of the organization is threefold:

- to increase visibility of family caregiving across the lifespan as an international issue;
- to promote the sharing of best practices in caregiving programs between countries; and
- to encourage and provide assistance to countries interested in developing family carer organizations.

IACO is headquartered in London. Initial IACO projects included promotion of a United Nations Day for Carers and a presentation on the IACO as part of a half-day workshop at the International Federation on Aging conference in Singapore on August 4, 2004. National family carer organizations in all countries are encouraged to join the alliance.

=== Canada ===
Canadian Caregivers Association logo

Canadian Caregivers Association is a non-for-profit organization that was established to protect the rights of Canadian families and caregivers from all over Canada and warn them about malpractices in this business.

=== Europe ===
EUROFAMCARE aims to provide a European review of the situation of family carers of elderly people in relation to the existence, familiarity, availability, use and acceptability of supporting services. In 2003 six countries (Germany, Greece, Italy, Poland, Sweden, United Kingdom) formed a trans-European group, systematically representing the different types of welfare-states in Europe and started a comparative study. The Pan-European Group consists of 23 countries (including the six countries, which are represented by the members of the Consortium).

The last step is a feedback research action phase based both on the study results and on the pan-European expertise. A European Carers' Charter in progress will be further developed by the new European network organization EUROCARERS in order to stimulate further activities both on national and European policy levels.

EUROCARERS was formally launched in June 2007 to provide a united voice at European level and influence policy both nationally and within the European Union. Eurocarers currently comprises representatives of 18 organisations and research bodies from nine countries. Members have come together to influence policy within the European Institutions to ensure that the invaluable contribution of carers is recognised across Europe.

EUFAMI - the European Federation of Families of People with Mental Illness - has been operating since 1992.

=== Ireland ===
The Carers Association was founded in 1987 to represent family carers and advocate for carers rights. The national census of 2006 shows that there are 160,917 people who stated that they are carers and almost 41,000 of these carers are providing 43 or more hours of care each week. They estimate that carers provide 194 million hours of care a year to the value of about 2.5 billion Euros to the economy. Approximately 33,000 full-time carers qualify for the Carers Allowance from the government.

=== Taiwan ===
The Taiwan Association of Family Caregivers (TAFC) was built in 1996. It is the first non-profit organization to voice the rights for family caregivers in Taiwan. The association encourages each city to set up a chapter in order to provide family caregivers with services. The main association is in Taipei and there are ten chapters around Taiwan. The TAFC claims that (1) The government should share the burden of family carers; (2) The government should provide well-qualified respite services; (3) The government should provide family carers with training and support; (4) Labor policy should help employees fulfill their responsibilities as family caregivers.

The TAFC provides family caregivers with a consulting hotline, newsletters of the association, in-service courses for professional personnel, support groups, and counseling services for caregivers. The association has allied with the Welfare Organization of the Elderly, Taiwan Long-term Care Professional Association, and Taiwan Alzheimer's Disease Association to build a support network for family caregivers.

- Family Caregivers Day is on the fourth Sunday of November every year. It hopes to raise public awareness and concern for family caregivers and hopes to make policies to support and help them.

=== Ukraine ===
There is no known or formal caregiver association established in Ukraine; however, there is an Institute of Gerontology which was established in 1958, and it has four main centers or associations which include:

- State Educational and Methodical Geriatric Center
- Ukrainian Scientific Center of Osteoporosis
- Ukrainian Association of Osteoporosis
- Ukrainian Association of Menopause, Andropause, and Disease of Bone and Joint System

This Institute has contributed research and publications which can be helpful in assisting the older population of the country and the caregivers of this population.
