= International Childfree Day =

Celebration of voluntary childlessness

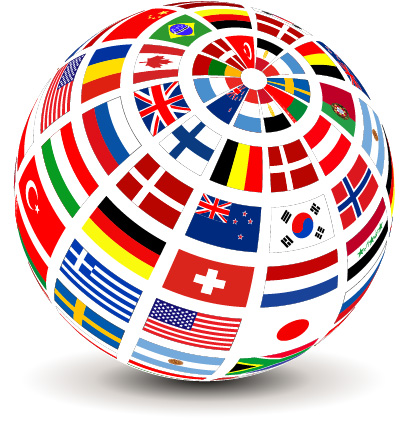
International Childfree Day

International Childfree Day is celebrated annually on 1 August. It was created in 1973 in the United States by the National Alliance for Optional Parenthood, at the time the National Organisation for Non-Parents (N.O.N.), under the name of Non-Parents' Day. The day is aimed at celebrating people who voluntarily choose not to have children and to foster acceptance of the childfree choice. It has also been described as "a day of celebration worldwide for those couples who have faced criticism, ridicule, and rejection because they chose to be Childless by Choice."

The initiative, resurrected in 2013 by author Laura Carroll, also bestows annual Non Parent of the Year Award, which initially consisted of a male and a female. As of 2018, the 'male' and 'female' categories were replaced by Childfree Person of the Year (a person of any gender identification) and Childfree Group of the Year (a couple, duo, trio, or a group, whether childfree romantic partners, social media groups, forum leaders, or website founders). Winners include Belgian writer Théophile de Giraud and American author Jennifer Thorpe-Moscon in 2013.

The 2020 winners were Elizabeth Hintz, an American doctoral candidate who "has dedicated her professional career to understanding and normalizing childfree experiences", and the Russian internet community "Childfree", which "has helped so many people to find a point of support in so pro-child, so patriarchal Russian society."
