= Jody Day =

Writer and founder of Gateway Network for childless women

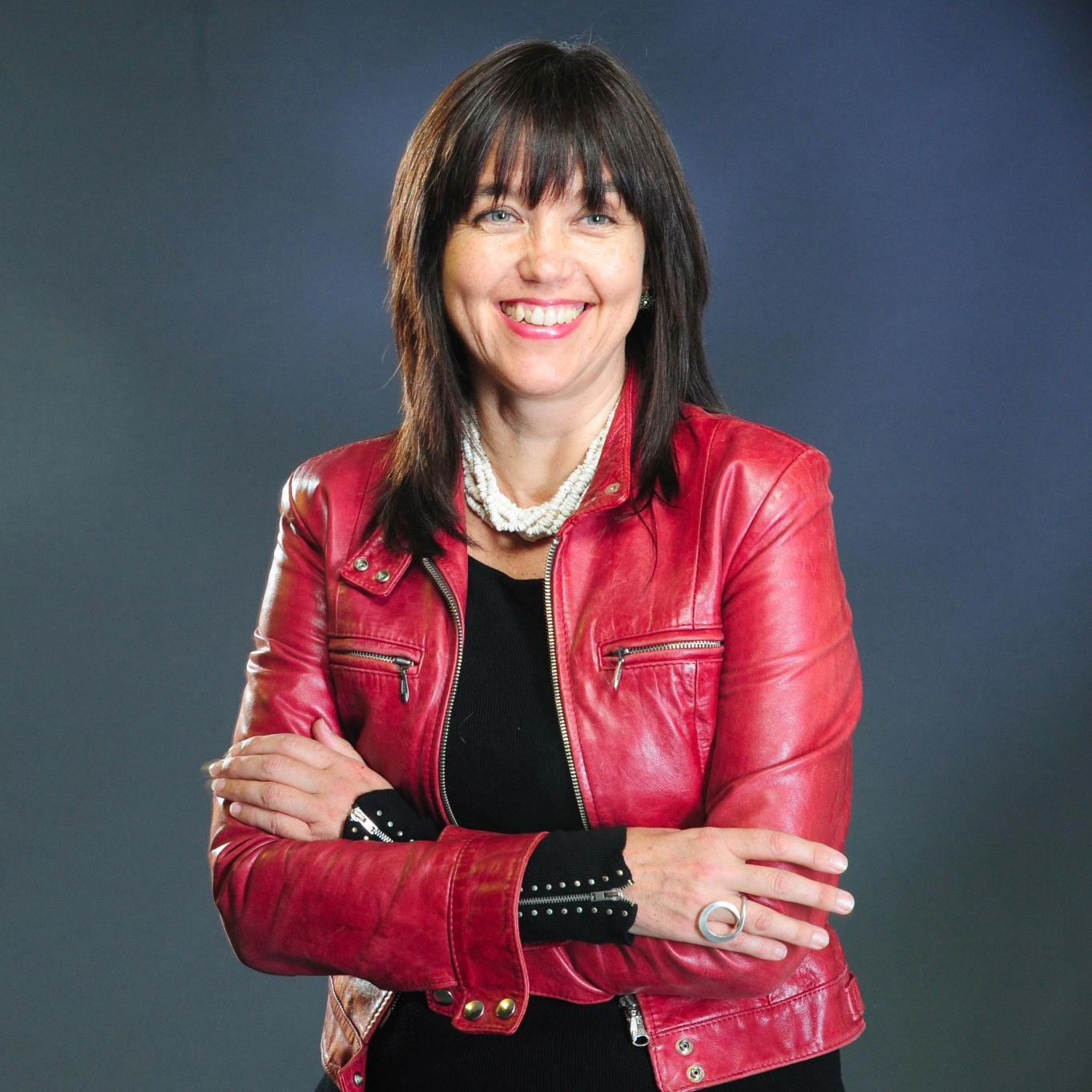
- Known for: founder of Gateway Women

Jody Day is an author. She is the founder of Gateway Women, a network for childless women. She was named one of BBC'S 100 Women for 2013.

Day is the director of an interior design company, with a degree in English literature. A former psychotherapist, in 2009, at the age of 44, she realized that she would never be a mother and set up a network of childless women aged 35 and over, named Gateway Women. She launched the Gateway Women blog in 2011.

Her book, Living the Life Unexpected and Rocking the Life Unexpected, helps people who cannot become parents to go through the stages of grief.
