= Now I Lay Me Down to Sleep (organization) =

U.S. based charitable organization

Now I Lay Me Down to Sleep (NILMDTS) is a U.S. based charitable organization operating worldwide, that offers free professionally taken photographs of stillborn babies and babies who die early in life.

== Organizational history ==
Founded in 2005 in Colorado by photographer Sandy Puc' and parents Cheryl and Mike Haggard whose baby died as an infant, the organization is active in all 50 states, plus 40 other countries, including Ireland and Canada. The group has 3000 volunteer photographers worldwide and has provided services to more than 30,000 families. The group is headquartered in Centennial, Colorado.

== Cultural context ==
In the late 19th century, post-mortem photography was popular and culturally accepted, though it fell out of style early the next century. This cultural shift was accompanied by a rejection of emotional bonding with stillborn babies, and infants who had died. Change in attitudes began in the 1970s and 1980s.

Now I Lay Me Down to Sleep is part of this increased concern for the emotional needs of grieving parents. Describing their photos, one mother wrote "They are not gruesome, they are not offensive, they are not graphic, nor are they violent". She went on to say "They are real life, in all its beauty and agony."

== See also ==
- Mourning
- Stillbirth and Neonatal Death Society
- Abigail's Footsteps
- Stillbirth Foundation Australia
- Still Aware
