= Kidding Aside =

Kidding Aside (The British Childfree Association) was founded in 2000 and exists in order to campaign for the rights of British childfree people. It is thought to be the first politically active childfree movement in the world and strives to introduce the childfree voice into relevant British political debate. It also works to promote the childfree lifestyle as a legitimate and equal alternative to parenthood, and campaigns for equality of opportunity for childfree people in employment and with regard to UK tax legislation. In addition to the voluntary childfree, the issues Kidding Aside speaks on also affect the lives of those who are involuntarily childfree.

== See also ==
- No Kidding!
