= AWOC =

AWOC may refer to:

- Ageing Without Children, British charity
- Agricultural Workers Organizing Committee, pre-1966 American workers' organisation
