= No Kidding =

No Kidding may refer to:

- No Kidding (film), a 1960 British comedy film
- No Kidding!, an international social organization
