= Pregnancy and Infant Loss Remembrance Day =

Annual observance on October 15

- Official name: Pregnancy and Infant Loss Remembrance Day
- Also called: Pregnancy and Infant Loss Awareness Day
- Observed by: Worldwide
- Type: International, secular and religious
- Significance: Remembers babies who have died during pregnancy, childbirth, or infancy; raises awareness of pregnancy and infant loss; and acknowledges the grief of bereaved families.
- Observances: International Wave of Light, illumination of landmarks and buildings worldwide, candle-lighting vigils, remembrance services and walks
- Date: October 15
- Frequency: Annual
- Related to: Pregnancy and Infant Loss Awareness Month (N. America), Baby Loss Awareness Week (UK), World Prematurity Day, Early Miscarriage Awareness Day

Pregnancy and Infant Loss Remembrance Day is observed annually on October 15 to raise public awareness of pregnancy and infant loss, remember babies who have died during pregnancy, at birth, or in infancy, and promote support for grieving families and those who support them. These include miscarriage, ectopic and molar pregnancy, stillbirth, termination for medical reasons, neonatal death, infant death, and sudden unexpected infant death, including sudden infant death syndrome (SIDS).

Pregnancy and infant loss are common experiences, yet social stigma and cultural taboos can limit acknowledgment, silence discussion, deepen isolation, and leave grieving families without adequate recognition or support. Open acknowledgment and compassionate support can help address this silence and the isolation experienced by grieving families. A growing number of public figures have supported open discussion of pregnancy and infant loss by sharing their own experiences, encouraging others to speak openly.

Pregnancy and Infant Loss Remembrance Day is observed in countries around the world, with recognition expanding since the early 2000s. Activities include remembrance services, walks, the reading of names, flag-raising ceremonies, and the International Wave of Light. Participation in the Wave of Light includes candle lighting, the illumination of homes, buildings, landmarks, monuments, and other public and private spaces, and virtual remembrance through online tributes, photographs, and videos shared on social media using the hashtag #WAVEofLiGHT.

== Overview ==
Pregnancy and Infant Loss Remembrance Day serves to promote greater awareness and support for the estimated 1 in 4 individuals and families whose lives are irrevocably altered by the death of their children during pregnancy, at birth, and in infancy. Experiences of loss vary for each individual and family unit; common effects include depression, anxiety, changes in relationships, development of unhealthy coping mechanisms, and Post Traumatic Stress Disorder (PTSD). These effects are often underestimated, misunderstood, or overlooked by health care professionals, friends, and family members, especially when concerning pregnancy loss related bereavement and subsequent grief.

Advocates believe that formalized day of observation increases public awareness and promotes greater research and understanding to aide in the creation and establishment of programs, resources and services to support and provide assistance to survivors of baby loss and their families, enabling them to overcome their trauma and integrate their bereavement into their life in a healthy manner.

A review published in The Lancet in 2021 estimated that 23 million miscarriages occur annually worldwide. An estimated 3.6 million infants died before reaching one year of age worldwide in 2024. The World Health Organization (WHO) estimated an annual occurrence of 2.6 million stillbirth.

A growing number of public figures have disclosed their personal experiences of pregnancy loss and infant death including Christina Perri, Beyoncé, Lily Allen, Nicole Kidman, Whitney Houston, Gwyneth Paltrow, Ali Wong, Michelle Obama, Chrissy Teigan, John Legend, Meghan Duchess of Sussex and Mark Zuckerberg. In 2021, Christina Perri released the album Songs for Rosie in memory of her stillborn daughter.

Bereaved families, advocacy groups and supporting organizations have campaigned for recognition of Pregnancy and Infant Loss Remembrance Day on October 15 through legislation, parliamentary resolutions and proclamations at national, state, provincial, territorial and municipal levels. The form and scope of recognition vary between jurisdictions. In the Philippines, Proclamation No. 700, issued in 2024, designated October 15 of every year as National Pregnancy and Infant Loss Remembrance Day. Canadian federal authorities also acknowledge the day, alongside provincial, territorial and municipal observances. In Ireland, Pregnancy and Infant Loss Remembrance Day and Baby Loss Awareness Week were acknowledged in the Seanad on October 15, 2026.

Pregnancy and Infant Loss Remembrance Day is marked on October 15 by remembrance and awareness activities in countries including Argentina, Australia, Belgium, Canada, France, Ireland, Italy, Mexico, New Zealand, South Africa, Spain, the United Kingdom and the United States. These activities include community gatherings, remembrance services, candle lighting and landmark illuminations. In the United Kingdom and New Zealand, October 15 concludes Baby Loss Awareness Week. Participation in these observances does not necessarily indicate a nationwide legal designation.

=== International Pregnancy and Infant Loss Remembrance Day ===
International Pregnancy and Infant Loss Remembrance Day is observed in several localities but is not universally recognized. Individuals, families, and organizations from around the world continue to promote greater public awareness of the prevalence of baby loss and the intense grief that often accompanies the experience. The number of locations that officially observe October 15 as Pregnancy and Infant Loss Remembrance Day has grown since the early 2000s.

The official awareness colors of the cause are pink and blue and are used for the campaign's awareness ribbon.

=== Wave of Light ===
Founded in 2003, the Wave of Light invites baby loss families, friends, loved ones and supporting organizations from around the world to join in honor and remembrance on October 15 at 7:00 pm in all time zones. Beginning in the first time zone, illuminations and candles remain lit for a period of at least one hour, with the next time zone lighting in its turn, moving westward as the Wave of Light circumnavigates the globe. Buildings, landmarks, monuments, and venues are illuminated while individuals, families, friends, and supporting organizations participate in lighting candles in remembrance.

== Efforts towards official recognition of day ==
=== United States ===
The United States Congress, by Senate Joint Resolution 314, designated the month of October 1988 as "Pregnancy and Infant Loss Awareness Month and authorized and requested the President to issue a proclamation in observance of this month which Ronald Reagan then formalized on October 25, 1988.

In 2001, Robyn Bear, Lisa Brown, and Tammy Novak initiated a campaign and petitioned the federal government and state governors of the United States to make October 15 an official holiday titled Pregnancy and Infant Loss Remembrance Day. Concurrent Resolution 222, which supported the goals and ideals of National Pregnancy and Infant Loss Remembrance Day, was passed in the U.S. House of Representatives on September 28, 2006.

=== United Kingdom ===
According to the registered charity the Stillbirth and Neonatal Death Society (Sands), the first Baby Loss Awareness Day was held in the United Kingdom on October 15, 2002 after a group of parents were inspired by the Pregnancy & Infant Loss Remembrance Day in the United States. Baby Loss Awareness Week has been in observance in the UK from October 9–15, since 2003, when the event was expanded into a week, the same year the first official Wave of Light was observed in the UK.

In 2016, Labor MP Vicky Foxcroft offered personal testimony in support of the week of remembrance.

=== Canada ===
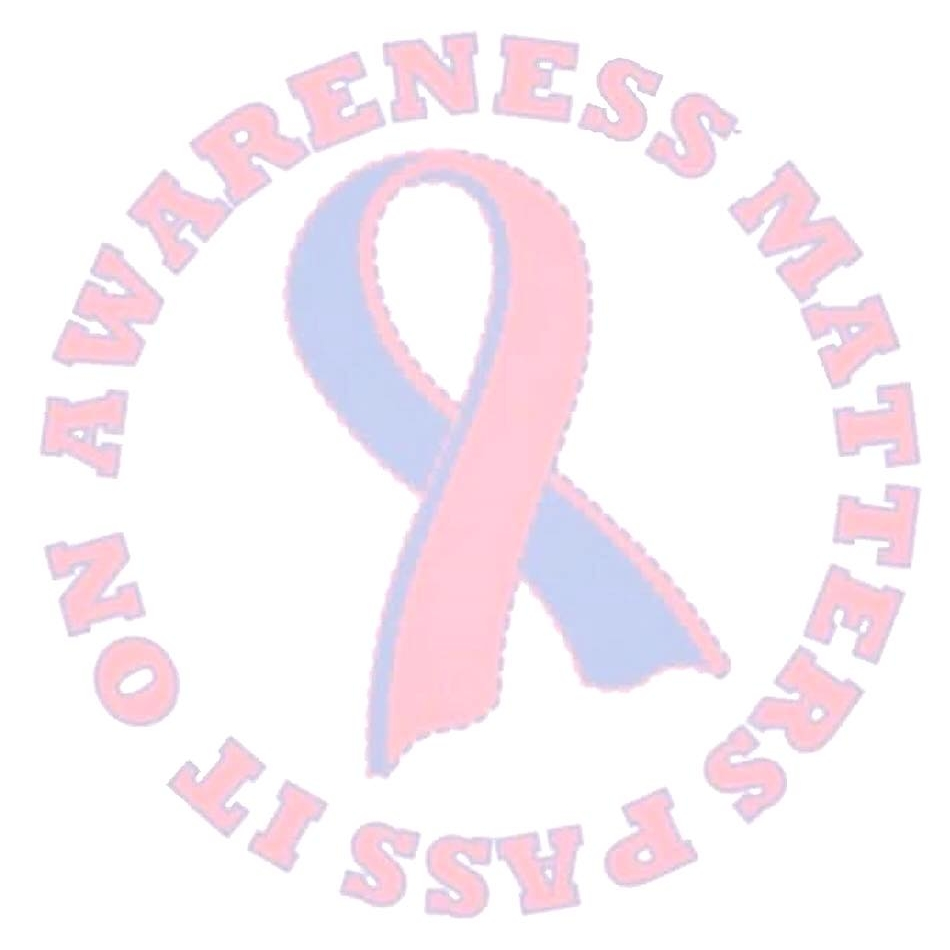
A campaign ribbon used to promote the recognition of Pregnancy and Infant Loss Remembrance Day

In 2005, New Brunswick was the first Canadian province to observe Pregnancy and Infant Loss Remembrance Day, an action granted by the New Brunswick Department of Health and Wellness on October 12, 2005. New Brunswick Minister of Health and Wellness Elvy Robichaud called on provincial residents to provide "support, education, and awareness for grieving parents who have lost children during pregnancy or shortly after birth" due to miscarriage and infant death being "a source of grief, often silent, for mothers, fathers, siblings, and grandparents."

In 2008, Manitoba recognized the holiday through Bill 226. In 2015, Ontario enacted Bill 141 which designated October 15 as Pregnancy and Infant Loss Awareness Day, with support for further research and program development. In 2017, Nova Scotia began to observe the holiday on October 15, as Pregnancy and Infant Loss Awareness Day, via Bill 38.

As of 2018, the holiday was nationally recognized in Canada.

=== Australia ===
In May 2008, Nicole Ballinger of New South Wales (NSW) contacted her Members of Parliament (MPs) to request help in creating an official Pregnancy and Infant Loss Remembrance Day. Ballinger worked with MPs Joanna Gash and Shelley Hancock from 2008 to 2011 to get an official remembrance day declared. On 15 October 2011, Pregnancy and Infant Loss Remembrance Day was officially declared in NSW.

John and Kate De'Laney campaigned for recognition of Pregnancy and Infant Loss Remembrance Day in Western Australia (WA). After Kate De'Laney wrote a letter to Premier Colin Barnett to bring Pregnancy and Infant Loss Remembrance Day to greater attention, the WA State Government passed a bipartisan agreement to officially recognize the holiday on October 15, 2014.

The De'Laney's worked with Senator Kristina Keneally to make October 15 nationally recognised by the Australian Parliament. Senators Keneally, Bilyk, McCarthy, and Polley, moved a motion in the upper house Australian Government to make Pregnancy and Infant Loss Remembrance Day an official Australian holiday and on February 17, 2021, the motion, put to the members of the lower house, passed unopposed.

=== South Africa ===
On 30 July 2025 a motion was moved in the Eastern Cape Provincial Parliament by JP Pretorius MPL to seek to have 15 October pronounced as Pregnancy and Infant Loss awareness day and October Month as Pregnancy and Infant Loss awareness month in the Province of the Eastern Cape in South Africa, as well as to propose changes to laws around burial rights of nonviable foetuses and improve support to miscarriage sufferers.

Member of the Executive Council responsible for Health Ntandokazi Capa supported this motion in a parliamentary debate on 30 October 2025 during the house sitting and committed that her department will put a plan in action to improve support of Pregnancy and Infant Loss sufferers and to canvass for this in South Africa at large, while also ensuring annual awareness programs are hosted by the Eastern Cape Department of Health to officially commemorate this cause.

An organisation called Voice of the Unborn Baby was instrumental in drawing attention and assisting towards this legislative proposal through a court case that gave necessary attention to laws around foetal burial rights and created more awareness to Pregnancy and Infant Loss. Its founder, Sonja Smith also hosts occasional workshops, social support sessions and events in addition to organising an annual event hosted in Pretoria called Walk of Remembrance to raise awareness for all forms of Pregnancy and Infant Loss.
