= Abigail's Footsteps =

Charity organisation

Abigail's Footsteps is a stillbirth charity organisation in the United Kingdom founded in 2010. They have donated material to several hospitals in England where stillbirths have occurred. By 2013 they had also raised over 15 thousand pounds for the Stillbirth and Neonatal Death Society.

== History ==
"Abigail's Footsteps was launched in 2010 by parents Jo and David Ward following the death of their daughter Abigail Ward who was stillborn at 41 weeks gestation".

== Personnel ==
- Cheryl Baker, Vice-President

== See also ==
- Now I Lay Me Down to Sleep (organization)
- Stillbirth Foundation Australia
- Still Aware
