= Childlessness =

State of not having children

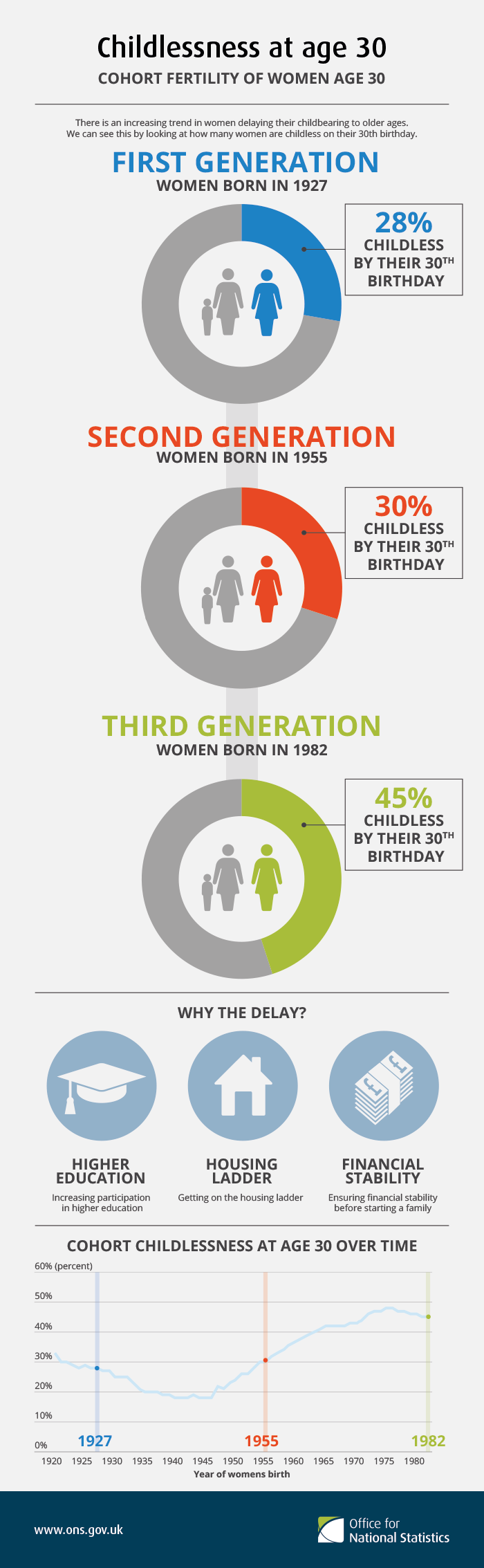
Childlessness among British women at age 30, data up to 2012

Childlessness is the state of not having children. Childlessness may have personal, social or political significance.

Childlessness, which may be by choice or circumstance, is distinguished from voluntary childlessness, also called being "childfree", which is voluntarily having no children, and from antinatalism, wherein childlessness is promoted.

== Types ==
=== Voluntary ===
Personal choice, having the physical, mental, and financial capability to have or adopt children but choosing not to (that is, voluntary childlessness), also called being "childfree".

=== Involuntary ===
Involuntary childlessness can be due infertility and inability to adopt. Infertility, the inability of a person or persons to conceive, due to complications related to either or both a woman or a man. This is regarded as the most prominent reason for involuntary childlessness. Biological causes of infertility vary because many organs of both sexes must function properly for conception to take place. Infertility also affects people who are unable to conceive a second or subsequent pregnancy. This is called secondary infertility.

Types of involuntary childlessness can be classified into several categories:

- natural sterility randomly affects individuals. One can think of it as the minimum level of permanent childlessness that we can observe in any given society, and it is of the order of 2 percent, in line with data from the Hutterites, a group established as the demographic standard in the 1950s.
- social sterility, which one can also call poverty-driven childlessness, or endogenous sterility, describes the situation of poor women whose fecundity has been affected by poor living conditions.
- people who are childless by circumstance. These people can be childless because they have not met a partner with whom they would like to have children, or because they tried unsuccessfully to conceive at an advanced maternal age, or because they suffer from certain medical issues, such as endometriosis or polycystic ovary syndrome (PCOS), that make it difficult for them to conceive.

Obstetric or gynaecological problems, including physical injury caused by a previous pregnancy.

Mental-health difficulties, such as impairment of executive functioning, that prevent a would-be parent from being able to raise a child properly.

Chronic illness/disability: Many serious chronic health conditions put the health of the mother and baby at undue risk if she were to become pregnant. These women are advised not to become pregnant. Some chronic health issues/disabilities obviate a parent from being able to care for a child.

Practical difficulties involving features of one's environment:

- Effects of social, cultural, or legal norms (sometimes referred to as "social infertility"):
- Combination of
  - Lack of a partner or a partner's being of the same biological sex as the person in question
  - Social or legal barriers to family formation through non-biological means (adoption or family "blending"), e.g., prohibitions against adoption by single persons, adoption by same-sex couples, marriage to a partner of the same sex who already has children, etc.
- Economic or social pressure to pursue a career before having children, increasing the odds of eventual infertility due to advanced maternal age
- Lack of resources sufficient to make bearing or raising a child a practically viable option:
- Insufficiency of financial resources vis-à-vis the level of family and other community support available
- Insufficiency of access to medical care (often overlaps with insufficiency of financial resources)
- Insufficiency of access to supportive care necessitated by employment commitments or mental-health impairments to daily functioning (see above)
- Unwillingness of one's partner, where existent, to conceive or raise children (includes partners who are unwilling to adopt children despite being biologically infertile, of the same biological sex, or physically absent).
- Involuntary celibacy

The death of all of a person's already-conceived children either before birth (as with miscarriage and stillbirth) or after birth (as with infant and child mortality) coupled with a person's not having yet had other children for reasons ranging from physical or emotional exhaustion to having passed childbearing age. Infant and child death can happen for any number of reasons, usually medical or environmental, such as biological malformations, maternal complications, accident or other injury, and disease. Both the existence of many of these causes and the severity of harm when present can be mitigated by ensuring that the infant's or child's environment features resources ranging from parenting and safety information to pre-, peri-, and postnatal medical care for mother and child.

== Statistics ==
Percentage of women remaining permanently childless for women born in 1975
Country	%
Japan	28.3
Spain	23.9
Italy	22.5
Austria	20.1
Germany	20.0
Poland	19.9
Finland	19.8
Canada	18.8
UK	18.0
Ireland	17.1
Hungary	17.0
Netherlands	16.9
France	14.8
Lithuania	14.0
Denmark	13.1
Estonia	13.1
South Korea	12.9
Sweden	12.9
Czechia	11.7
Iceland	11.7
Slovakia	11.5
Norway	11.4
United States	10.3

According to the statistic by Organisation for Economic Co-operation and Development (OECD), declining total fertility rates (TFRs) across OECD countries are associated with an increase in childlessness and smaller family sizes among women. The rise in permanent childlessness has varied significantly by country and generation. In Canada, childlessness increased mainly among women born between 1935 and 1955, while in most OECD countries the trend accelerated among cohorts born between 1955 and 1975. By 2024, approximately 28% of women born in 1975 in Italy, Spain, and Japan remained childless, more than double the rate observed in earlier generations. Austria, Germany, Italy, and Spain reported childlessness rates of 20–24% among women born in 1975, whereas most other OECD countries recorded rates between 10% and 20%.

The data do not distinguish between voluntary and involuntary childlessness, though research indicates a discrepancy between intended and actual fertility outcomes, particularly among highly educated women in Europe and the United States.

=== United States ===
The analysis of the three broad categories of childlessness (natural sterility, social sterility, voluntary childlessness) outlined above helps to understand how it has changed over the last century in the United States. At the end of the 19th century, income and education levels were low. This made levels of social sterility very high. In addition to the causes mentioned above, the Spanish Influenza epidemics meant that pregnant women who were infected were particularly vulnerable to miscarriages. The Great Depression also impoverished these generations, for whom voluntary childlessness was almost absent. On the whole, the rates of childlessness for married women born between 1871 and 1915 fluctuated between 15 and 20 percent. The rise in both education and overall income allowed subsequent generations to escape from situations where couples were “constrained” from having children, and rates of childlessness began to fall. Over time, the nature of childlessness changed, becoming more and more the chosen outcome of some educated women. A low level of childlessness of 7% was achieved by the generation of the baby boom. It started to rise again for the subsequent generations, with 12 percent of women born in 1964-68 remaining childless.

After a relatively stable birth rate for thirty years, the number of live births per 100 women aged 15 to 44 resumed a decline beginning in 2008, to record low rates.

The fertility rate in the U.S. has been in a downward trend, and is now below the replacement rate of 2.1 births.

From 2007 to 2011, the fertility rate in the U.S. declined 9%; the Pew Research Center reported in 2010 that the birth rate was the lowest in U.S. history and that childlessness rose across all racial and ethnic groups to about 1 in 5 versus 1 in 10 in the 1970s. The CDC released statistics in the first quarter of 2016 confirming that the U.S. fertility rate had fallen to its lowest point since record keeping started in 1909: 59.8 births per 1,000 women, half its high of 122.9 in 1957. Even taking the falling fertility rate into account, the U.S. Census Bureau still projected that the U.S. population would increase from 319 million (2014) to 400 million by 2051.

=== Europe ===
Percentage of women remaining permanently childless
Country	for women born in 1955	for women born in 1935
Austria	20.7
Finland	20.1
Netherlands	17.1	11.7
Canada	16.4	5.9
USA	16.3	6.1
Germany	16.0
UK	16.0	12.0
Denmark	14.3	12.9
Sweden	12.8
Ireland	12.4
France	12.0	12.7
Japan	11.9	11.2
Norway	11.8
Italy	11.1
Poland	10.4

In a paper presented at a 2013 United Nations Economic Commission for Europe work session on Demographic Projections, Swedish statisticians reported that since the 2000s, childlessness had decreased in Sweden and marriages had increased. It had also become more common for couples to have a third child, suggesting that the nuclear family was no longer in decline in Sweden.

The number of people over 50 in the UK without adult children in 2023 was reported to be 20 percent.

== Solutions for involuntary childlessness ==
Medical interventions may be available to some individuals or couples to treat involuntary childlessness. Some options include artificial insemination, intracytoplasmic sperm injection (ICSI) and in vitro fertilization. Artificial insemination is the process in which sperm is collected via masturbation and inserted into the uterus immediately after ovulation. Intracytoplasmic sperm injection is a more recent technique that involves injecting a single sperm directly into an egg; the egg is then placed in the uterus by in vitro fertilization. In vitro fertilization (IVF) is the process in which a mature ovum is surgically removed from a woman's ovary, placed in a medium with sperm until fertilization occurs, and then placed in the woman's uterus. About 50,000 babies in the United States are conceived this way and are sometimes referred to as "test-tube babies." Other forms of assisted reproductive technology include, gamete intrafallopian transfer (GIFT) and zygote intrafallopian transfer (ZIFT). Fertility drugs may also improve the chances of conception in women.

For those facing social infertility (such as single individuals or same-sex couples) as well as heterosexual couples with medical infertility, other options include surrogacy and adoption. Surrogacy, in this case a surrogate mother, is the process in which a woman becomes pregnant (usually by artificial insemination or surgical implantation of a fertilized egg) for the purpose of carrying the fetus to term for another individual or couple. Another option may be adoption; to adopt is to take voluntarily (a child of other parents) as one's own child.

== Contraception ==
All forms of contraception have played a role in voluntary childlessness over time, but the invention of reliable oral contraception contributed profoundly to changes in societal ideas and norms. Voluntary childlessness, resulting from contraception, has influenced women's health, laws and policies, interpersonal relationships, feminist issues, and sexual practices among adults and adolescents.

The availability of oral contraception during the late 1900s was directly related to the women's rights movement by establishing, for the first time, a mass distribution of a way to control fertility. The so-called "pill" gave women the opportunity to make different life choices they may not previously have been able to make, such as, for example, furthering their career. This led to monumental changes in the current gender and family roles.

Margaret Sanger, an activist in 1914, was an important figure during the reproductive rights movement. She coined the term "birth control" and opened the first birth control clinic in the U.S. Sanger collaborated with many others to make the first oral contraception possible, these persons include: Gregory Pincus, John Rock, Frank Colton, and Katherine McCormick. The pill was approved by the FDA (Food and Drug Administration) for contraceptive use in 1960. Although it was controversial, it remained the most popular form of birth control in the U.S. until 1967, when there was a rise in publicity about the possible health risks associated with the pill; consequently, sales dropped twenty-four percent. In the year 1988, the original high-dose pill was taken off the market and replaced with a low-dose pill that was considered to have fewer risks and some health benefits.

== Impacts ==
=== Personal ===
Before conception was well understood, childlessness was usually blamed on the woman, and this in itself added to the high level of negative emotional and social effects of childlessness. “Some wealthy families also adopted children, as a means of providing heirs in cases of childlessness or where no sons had been born.” The monetary incentives offered by Westerners' desire for children are so strong that a commercial market in child laundering exists.

=== Psychological ===
People trying to cope with involuntary childlessness may experience symptoms of distress that are similar to those experienced by bereaved people, such as health problems, anxiety, and depression.

=== Political ===
Specific instances of childlessness, especially in cases of royal succession, but more generally for people in positions of power or influence, have had enormous impacts on politics, culture, and society. In many cases, a lack of a male child was also considered a type of childlessness, since male children were needed as heirs to property and titles. Examples of historical impacts of actual or potential childlessness include:

- Henry VIII of England divorced his first wife Catherine of Aragon, to whom he had been married for more than 20 years, because she had not produced a male heir to the throne. The refusal of Pope Clement VII to recognise the divorce led to the formal rejection of papal authority by Henry and the English Reformation Parliament, beginning the English Reformation.
- Elizabeth I of England was childless, choosing not to marry in part to prevent political instability in the kingdom, which passed on her death from the House of Tudor to the House of Stuart, causing the Union of the Crowns.
- Queen Anne had seventeen pregnancies, but none of her children survived, so the throne passed from the House of Stuart to the House of Hanover.
- Napoléon’s first wife, Joséphine de Beauharnais, did not bear him any children, so he divorced her to marry Marie Louise of Austria in 1810.
- The lack of a male heir to the Chrysanthemum Throne in Japan brought the country to the brink of a constitutional crisis prior to the birth of Prince Hisahito of Akishino in 2006.

=== Social ===
Socially, childlessness has also resulted in financial stress and sometimes ruin in societies that depend on their offspring to contribute economically and to support other members of the family or tribe. "In agricultural societies, about 20 per cent of all couples would not have children because of problems for at least one of the partners. Worry about assuring the desired birth rate could become an important part of family life … even after a first child was born. … In agricultural societies, up to half of all children born would die within two years … (Excess surviving children could, among other things, be sent to childless families to provide labour there, reducing upkeep demands at home.) When a population disaster hits – like war or major disease – higher birth rates might briefly be feasible to fill out community ranks."

In the 20th and 21st centuries, when control over conception became reliable in some countries, childlessness has had an enormous impact on national and financial planning. In societies where child-bearing is a sign of a high libido, childlessness may be viewed as a sign of low libido. They may also be disparaged with terms like genetic dead end.

In some countries, even those with state health and social care services, children often support elderly family members either by becoming their full or part-time carers, or by, for example, accompanying them to medical appointments, helping with cleaning and shopping, taking care of intimate personal care tasks, or by looking after their finances. If national health and care services dwindle due to decreased funding or lack of staff, and if the number of people without children nearby increases, the statistics for those left without help and support as they age are set to soar. The UK charity, Ageing Without Children, set up in 2012, advocates for those without support from children or others in the future generation.

=== In religion ===
Several people mentioned in the Hebrew Bible and the New Testament were childless until late in life, and their childlessness was a factor affecting their faith and religious practice, for example Abram and Sarai (later Abraham and Sarah) in Genesis 15-16, Hannah in 1 Samuel 1:1-18, and Elizabeth and Zechariah in Luke's Gospel.

=== Stigma ===
In a society that encourages and promotes parenthood, with its current social norms and culture, childlessness can be stigmatizing. Pronatalism, the idea that couples should reproduce and want to reproduce, remains widespread in North America, contrary to most European cultures. Women in Australia, and both men and women in the UK have reported facing stigma and social exclusion because of their childlessness.

Childlessness may be considered deviant behavior in marriage, and this may lead to adverse effects on the relationship between a couple, as well as their individual identities, when the lack of children is involuntary. For persons who consider that becoming parents was a critical process of their adult family life, a "transition" as Rossi deems it, must take place. This transition is from the anticipated parenthood to an unwanted status of non-parenthood. Such a transition may require the individual to readjust their perspective of self or relationship role with their significant other.

=== Other ===
- Finances: As a result of their higher educational achievements, higher-paying jobs, and dual income, childless couples tend to have greater financial stability as compared to those with children. On average, a childless couple spends 60 percent more on entertainment, 79 percent more on food, and 101 percent more on dining out. Childless couples are also more likely to have pets, and those that do tend to spend a good deal more money on them.
- Quality of life: childless persons typically eat more healthily than those with children, consuming more fruits and vegetables, and also more meat. Happiness may also play a distinctive role in the comparison between people with children and those without. Different studies have indicated that marital happiness decreases dramatically after a child is born and does not recover until after the last child has left the house. A study at the University of Wisconsin-Madison found that working outside the home and receiving less support from extended family, as well as other factors, have increased the level of stress associated with raising children and decreased overall marital satisfaction as a result. Childless couples were more likely to take vacations, exercise, and overall live a healthier lifestyle than those who have children.
- Pensions: Childlessness can impact pay-as-you-go pension sustainability and funding.

== See also ==
- Antinatalism
- Child tax credit
- Cost of raising a child
- Decree 770
- Dual Income, No Kids (DINK)
- LGBT parenting
- List of international adoption scandals
- Only child
- Pregnancy and Infant Loss Remembrance Day
- Tax on childlessness

== Bibliography ==
- Britt, Elizabeth C (2014). Conceiving Normalcy: Rhetoric, Law, and the Double Binds of Infertility. University of Alabama Press. ISBN 9780817357900.
- Guthrie, Gillian (2012). Childless: reflections on life's longing for itself, Leichhardt, N.S.W.: A&A Book Publishing ISBN 978-0-9870899-7-7
