= National Alliance for Optional Parenthood =

Support group

- Operates in the US
- Formation: 1972

The National Organization for Non-Parents (N.O.N.) was started in Palo Alto, California, by Ellen Peck and Shirley Radl in 1972. N.O.N was formed to advance the notion that people could choose not to have children—to be childfree. Changing its name to the National Alliance for Optional Parenthood, it continued into the early 1980s both as a support group for those making the decision to be childfree and an advocacy group fighting pronatalism (attitudes/advertising/etc. promoting or glorifying parenthood). According to its bylaws, the purpose of the National Alliance for Optional Parenthood was to educate the public on non-parenthood as a valid lifestyle option, support those who choose not to have children, promote awareness of the overpopulation problem, and assist other groups that advanced the goals of the organization.

N.O.N.'s offices were located in Reisterstown, Maryland; then Baltimore, Maryland; and, ultimately, in Washington, D.C.

The organization's most widely distributed publication was "Am I Parent Material?"

NON designated August 1 as Non-Parents' Day, and forty years later, in 2013, Laura Carroll, a childfree author and writer on the childfree choice, spearheaded bringing back this "Day" on August 1 of each year as International Childfree Day, an "annual recognition of amazing childfree people and their lives, and as a wonderful way to foster the acceptance of the childfree choice in today’s society".

Some of the early works on non-parenthood/being childfree include:

- "The Baby Trap" 1971 by Ellen Peck and William Granzig
- "Mother's Day is Over" 1973 by Shirley Radl
- "Pronatalism: The Myth of Mom and Apple Pie" 1974 by Ellen Peck and Judith Senderowitz
- "A Baby Maybe" 1975 by Elizabeth Whelan
- "Childless by Choice" 1975 by Jean Veevers
- "The Parent Test: How to Measure and Develop Your Talent for Parenthood" (ISBN 0399120300)(1978) with by Ellen Peck and William Granzig

More recent works include:

- The Baby Matrix: Why Freeing Our Minds From Outmoded Thinking About Parenthood & Reproduction Will Create a Better World 2012 by Laura Carroll (LiveTrue Books, ISBN 978-0615642994)

== See also ==
- Childfree
- Family planning
- Pronatalism

== Sources ==
- TIME on N.O.N
