= Born in Bradford =

Born in Bradford is a large birth cohort study based at Bradford Royal Infirmary, a hospital in the city of Bradford, West Yorkshire in the United Kingdom. 12,500 pregnant women were recruited to the study between March 2007 and December 2010. The lives of their 13,500 children are being tracked through research studies and the use of routinely collected medical and educational data.

== Background ==
Bradford has some of the highest rates of childhood illness in the UK. Born in Bradford is helping to unravel the reasons for this ill health and bring new scientific discovery to the world. It is also providing a catalyst for communities to work with the NHS and local authority to improve child health and wellbeing in the city. Examples of the success of Born in Bradford in changing practice include: the establishment of a Yorkshire wide congenital anomalies register, the first trust in the UK to provide gestational diabetes screening for all pregnant women in the district, improvement in vitamin D supplementation in high risk mothers, rapid implementation of NICE guidelines in midwifery practice, improved detection of childhood obesity by health visitors, and development of a simple mobile phone app to help parents and health professionals monitor children's weight.

Born in Bradford will continue to follow children until they are adults, and help doctors to understand more about the big health challenges of the 21st century such as heart disease, mental health and cancer. This is a study that has the potential to promote real change at a local level and also to make major contributions to global knowledge. The results have been tested and validated alongside the Pregnancy Outcome Prediction study.

The project does an annual programme on BBC Radio 4 hosted by Winifred Robinson.
