= Still Aware =

Still Aware is a charity organisation which attempts to raise awareness of stillbirth as a national issue in Australia, since stillbirth rates in the country are high for a developed nation. It is Australia's first stillbirth awareness organization and the first not-for-profit charity solely dedicated to ending preventable stillbirths.

== Mission ==
The organization is committed to raising awareness and breaking the taboo surrounding stillbirth, encouraging parents to speak of their experiences. It also works towards preventing stillbirth through education for mothers, families and health clinics. They actively lobby for stillbirth to be listed and remain on the policy agenda at a national level in Australia. It works to gather and report data of care provisions already offered internationally, but which are not offered to Australian patients yet.

== Personnel ==
- Claire Foord, CEO

== See also ==
- Stillbirth Foundation Australia
- Stillbirth and Neonatal Death Society
- Now I Lay Me Down to Sleep (organization)
- Abigail's Footsteps
