= Childfree Russia =

Russian opposition non-government movement

Childfree Russia is a Russian opposition non-governmental movement founded by activist Edward Lisovskii (Эдвард Лисовский). It was established in 2012 as the first childfree movement in Russia.

== History ==
Edward Lisovskii, a founder of the movement, is a marketer by profession. He headed the company "Advertising Group of the Russian Federation", which worked with advertising in the Moscow Metro, online with Victoria Bonya, Vadim Galygin and Justin Bieber, as well as Odnoklassniki, MTS and TV shows.

In 2012, Lisovskii compiled the principles of the childfree ideology in Russia and opened several communities on social networks.

In 2013, VKontakte, at the request of the prosecutor's office, blocked Lisovskii's personal accounts and his community on VKontakte, and he urgently left St. Petersburg.

According to a 2020 study by the NAFI Analytical Center, 46% of Russians aged 18 to 45 do not want to have children. State television associates this fact with the development of his ideology.

In 2021, Russian far-right MP Vitaly Milonov publicly stated that he would like to ban Childfree Russia and imprison Lisovskii for spreading "childfree propaganda".

In 2022, Senator Margarita Pavlova came up with a bill to ban content related to childfree topics, and equate Edward Lisovskii with an extremist because of his childfree views. Lisovskii was forced to flee Russia in February 2022 by the Russian law enforcement forces, moving into exile in Indonesia. He constantly emphasizes that there is no childfree propaganda in Russia.

In November 2024, the State Duma voted unanimously to ban "childfree propaganda".
