= Stillbirth Foundation Australia =

Social support organization

Stillbirth Foundation Australia is an organization which aims to improve care and conditions for people who have experienced the stillbirth of a child as well as preventing stillbirth. Their main work is funding research on why stillbirth happens. They have also encouraged Australian companies to allow parents of stillborn children to have parental leave. It is the only charity in Australia dedicated to stillbirth research.

== Personnel ==
- Victoria Bowring, general manager

== See also ==
- Still Aware
- Stillbirth and Neonatal Death Society
- Now I Lay Me Down to Sleep (organization)
- Abigail's Footsteps
