= Canadian Caregivers Association =

Canadian non-profit organization

- Website: www.cca-acaf.ca

The Canadian Caregivers Association (CCA - ACAF) is a non-profit organization that was established to protect the rights of live-in caregivers and families from all over Canada and warn them about malpractice in this business. Working with industry partners to create new standards of practice, the Canadian Caregivers Association advocates many important changes that need to be made to guarantee live-in caregiver rights and meet the needs of Canadian families.

The staff and volunteers of the CCA offer information about the Live-in Caregiver Program, access to caregiver resources, and linkage services to caregivers who approach the organization with their problems. Both caregivers and employers can get in touch with the staff and volunteers by phone, e-mail, or mail to get the information and support they need, and to be connected to service and support organizations that can help further. The organization offers free legal advice in the area of immigration law. Since 2008 CCA initiated a cooperation with Bogdan Enica, RCIC, in order to offer free immigration support for caregivers in need.

Also in 2009, the organization produced a DVD titled "Live-in in Canada", about the live-in caregiver program.

== Toronto Star Investigations ==
The Toronto Star Series, which started on March 14, 2009, on stories of caregiver abuse pulled the CCA into the public forum to discuss means of resolving problems facing the program. The later development of the story of Member of Parliament, Ruby Dhalla, created additional awareness. Ruby Dhalla named the CCA as an organization that she intends to work with in the future to help resolve the program's inherent problems.
