= No Kidding! =

International non-profit social club

No Kidding! International is an international non-profit social club created for singles and couples who have never had children regardless of the reason. Such people are generally described as "childless" by society at large, but some of their members who are childless by choice prefer the term "childfree" in order to highlight the voluntary nature of their circumstance. The first chapter of this organization was begun by Jerry Steinberg (the "Founding Non-Father" of No Kidding!) in Vancouver, British Columbia, in 1984. There are numerous chapters in Canada, the United States and several other countries.

The stated purpose of No Kidding! is to give childless and childfree adults a place to share common interests not involving children, as well as to provide the opportunity to make new like-minded friends. Anyone who has never been a parent, regardless of the reason, is permitted to join. The club organizes a wide range of activities, including biking, hiking, wine and cheese parties, dinners, Sunday brunches, community theater, and concerts.

The organization has annual conventions where people from all over the U.S. and Canada gather. Conventions were held annually between 2002 and 2006. So far, conventions have been held in Las Vegas, New Orleans, Seattle, Philadelphia and Toronto. In 2010, the convention was in Houston.

The group's founder, as well as representatives of various No Kidding! chapters, have made numerous appearances in international media, as well as in local newspapers, radio shows and TV programs.

== See also ==
- Kidding Aside, a British childfree movement
