= Termination for medical reasons =

Medical procedure

A termination for medical reasons (TFMR) is an induced abortion motivated by medical indications involving the fetus or mother. In most countries, health risks are the only basis for obtaining a legal abortion. Prenatal screening can allow early diagnosis, and abortion if desired or necessary. Some medical organizations advocate the offer of diagnostic testing by chorionic villi sampling, and amniocentesis to all pregnant women, as a matter of course.

Screening and diagnostic tests can provide the information needed to make a decision on whether or not to abort. Responses may involve feelings of guilt, and may even lead to developing post-traumatic stress disorder. TFMR is one of the least talked about types of pregnancy loss, but is more common than generally realised. It is stressful, and the involved people need support during the pregnancy and after its termination.

A number of factors may influence a person's decision to terminate the pregnancy, including the severity of a condition, and its impact on life expectancy and quality of life.

== Medical reasons ==
Medical reasons for inducing or performing an abortion are usually due to concerns about fetal viability or disability. These reasons include chromosomal and genetic abnormalities, structural abnormalities, and fetal reduction.

More rarely, the medical reasons may be primarily about the ability of the mother to survive the pregnancy without serious or permanent injury.

== Prenatal testing ==
During prenatal care if a pregnancy is considered to be at high risk for a genetic disorder, prenatal testing can be undertaken to determine the health of the embryo or fetus. Two such diagnostic tests are chorionic villus sampling (CVS) and amniocentesis.

== Legal considerations ==
Individual states and countries vary on their restrictions for termination of pregnancy.

In the UK, abortions after 24 weeks' gestational age are only legal to protect the mother's physical or mental health, or if the fetus is "seriously handicapped" due to "physical or mental abnormalities". As of 2020, in the UK, about 1.5% of abortions were due to serious physical or mental disability in the fetus; about half of these were due to congenital malformation, and a quarter to chromosomal abnormalities. About one in one thousand abortions in the UK involved late termination of pregnancy (performed after 24 weeks) due to fetal disability; most abortions involving fetal anomaly are performed earlier in pregnancy. Relatively few abortions – 128 out of more than 200,000 abortions in the UK each year – are intended to save the life of the mother or to prevent grave permanent injury to the mother's physical or mental health.

TFMR has been legal since 1927 in Germany. In 1975, West German abortion law changed to permit abortions at any time if there was a serious danger to the mother's health and in case of fetal abnormalities through 22 weeks, in addition to permitting some abortions for non-medical reasons before 12 weeks. The law changed again during German reunification. In 2013, 4% of legal abortions in Germany were due to either medical reasons or because the pregnancy was the result of a crime, and 96% were for personal or social reasons.

== Psychosocial considerations ==
Pregnancy termination is a stressful experience. In some respects, the aftermath of TFMR is similar to any other type of unwanted pregnancy loss, including the need to grieve the lost child. Parents commonly experience distress, depression, and guilt for several months afterwards, or even longer. In TFMR, the concept of abortion as a "choice" does not accurately capture the true complexities of deciding to end a wanted pregnancy. Approximately 72% of parents undergoing TFMR felt that their experience was not the same as other types of baby loss, and that they do not always feel they "fit in" with other types of baby loss support groups because of their specific experience.

A number of factors may influence the decision to terminate. Some common reasons are medical, such as the severity of the condition, the life expectancy and quality of life for the affected person, and available treatment options for the condition. Other common reasons are non-medical, such as personal values and beliefs, financial and employment considerations, the general family situation, including other children, and the availability of social support.

Religious beliefs can influence whether parents accept TFMR if recommended. Under Jewish laws, abortion to protect the mother's life or health is acceptable, and, to save the mother's life, abortion may be considered a requirement. Some Jewish authorities support abortion to protect the mother's mental health.

== Support ==
When involved in psychotherapy for TFMR, the process may often include cognitive and behavioral approaches aimed at improving thoughts, feelings, and behaviors, to include positive coping strategies. According to Zareba et al. (2018), coping strategies most frequently mentioned in literature are: conversation (with the partner, family, friends, psychologist, physician), internalization of one's feelings, participation in support groups, psychotherapy, seeking information (in the literature, on the Internet, on television), denial and repression, concentrating on one's children, trying to conceive again quickly, seeking spiritual support, waiting, memorializing rituals, going on vacation or holiday with the partner or family.

== Disability rights concerns ==
TFMR due to expected fetal disability (as opposed to life-threatening medical conditions that could kill the mother or fetus) has been criticized by some in the disability rights movement.

In the United Kingdom, a challenge based on Article 8 of the European Convention on Human Rights to the provisions in the Abortion Act 1967 that allowed the late-term abortion of fetuses with Down syndrome, failed in 2021. Attempts have been made to remove the ability to perform late-term abortions for disability reasons through legislation.

== See also ==
- Miscarriage
