= Sands (charity) =

UK charity supporting families after baby loss

Sands (formally Stillbirth and Neonatal Death charity) is a national charity in the United Kingdom that provides support to anyone affected by the death of a baby.

Their registered address is 10-18 Union Street, London SE1 1SZ and is a registered charity.

== Activities ==
Its activities include:

- offering support via meetings, telephone and email for bereaved parents and women who are pregnant again or thinking of having another baby
- training for hospitals and other healthcare providers to ensure bereaved parents receive adequate and appropriate care and support
- conveying information about stillbirth and neonatal death through publications and its website
- promoting research to reduce the loss of babies' lives.

The charity has supported the Pregnancy Outcome Prediction study (POPS) by providing funding for research and sharing results on their website. It is hoped that the research will help gain a better understanding of why some pregnancies are at a higher risk of complications than others.

The charity is also a member of Confidential Enquiry into Maternal Deaths in the UK which collects and shares data around all late foetal losses in the UK.

Sands Freephone Helpline

In March 2017 the Sands Helpline number changed to 0808 164 3332. The number is free to call from landlines and mobiles.

== Sands Garden ==
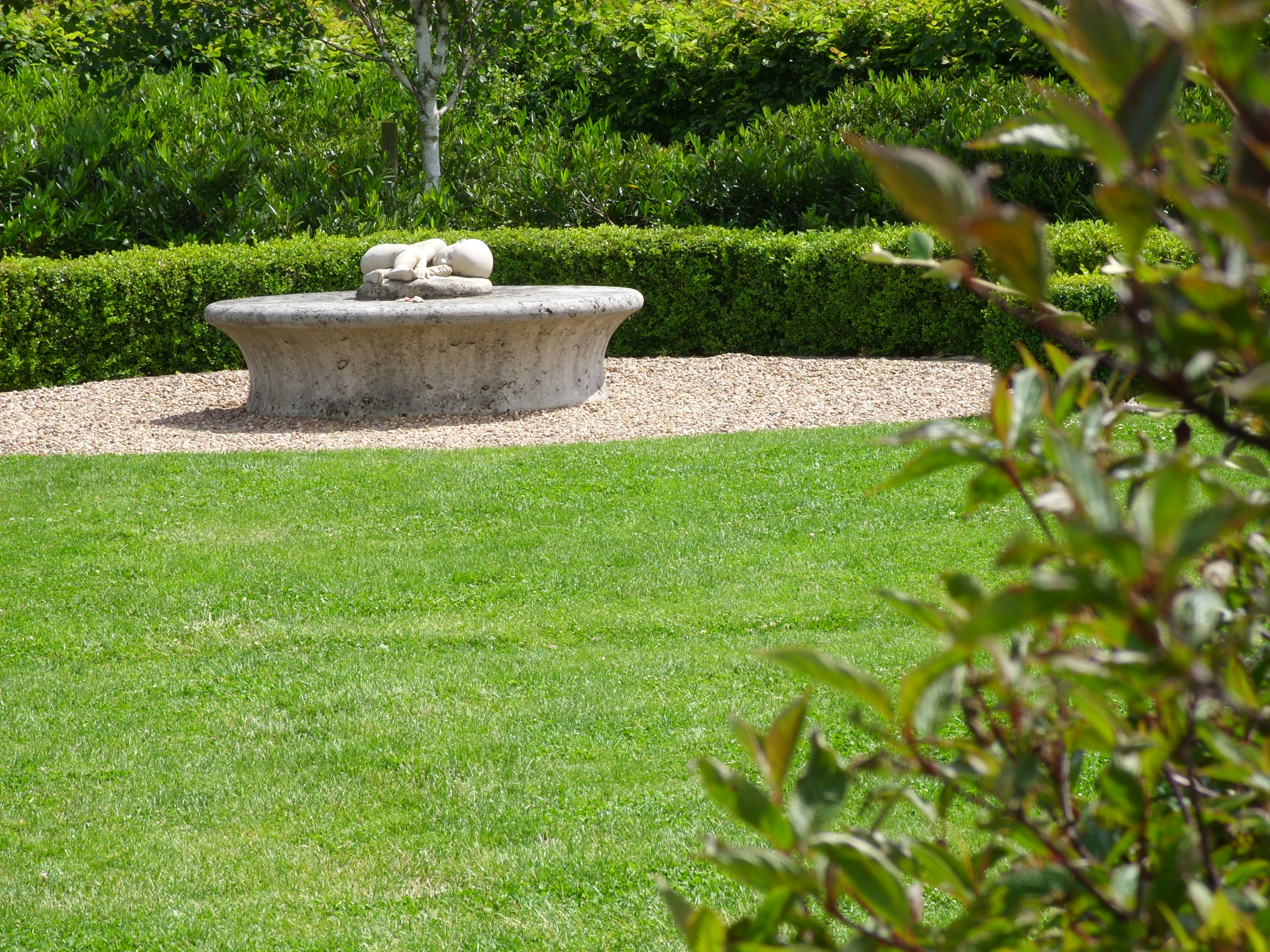
Stillbirth and Neonatal Death Charity Garden

The Stillbirth and Neonatal Death Charity Garden is a feature within the National Memorial Arboretum, the UK national site of remembrance at Alrewas, near Lichfield in Staffordshire.

== Rebrand ==
In 2025 the charity formally rebranded itself, changing its name from the Stillbirth and Neonatal Death Society, to the acronym Sands. The name change was made after there were concerns that some people worried they were not qualified for support from the charity due to the circumstances around their baby's loss. The charity had been using the name Sands publicly for several years, but changed it to coincide with a new logo and graphic design guidelines. It spent almost £40,000 on the rebrand, hoping it would help with the aim of doubling the charity’s income from £7.5m to £15m over a period of five years.

== See also ==
- Perinatal mortality
- Stillbirth Foundation Australia
- Still Aware
- Abigail's Footsteps
- Baby Loss Awareness Week
