= Ageing Without Children =

UK charity founded in 2021

Ageing Without Children, founded in 2021, is a UK charity. With a network of local groups, it advocates for and supports those who are ageing and who do not have children or other members of the future generation to support them with practical tasks, social connections, or navigation through medical, legal or other civic spheres. The organisation produces webinars and reports, and collates relevant resources on later life planning. It also works with researchers to improve the knowledge base with which to influence local and national policy towards a hitherto marginalised but growing group of people.

== History ==
In 2015 after an article written by Kirsty Woodard and published in The Guardian newspaper, Ageing Well Without Children (AWWOC) was set up as a community interest company.

In 2014 AWWOC held a conference in London to highlight the issues affecting people ageing without children. It was attended by over 100 participants. In 2016 AWWOC published a report highlighting the experiences of people ageing without children. The same year, a second conference was held, this time in Birmingham, focussing on planning for later life.

In 2018 a grant of £15,000 helped AWWOC to develop its work in the South West of England. In 2019 AWWOC, lacking funds, passed its assets to The PRAMA Foundation who kept the issue and the website live. In 2020 AWWOC conducted two surveys that showed how, in the context of the COVID pandemic and subsequent lockdowns, those ageing without family support could feel socially isolated and fearful. In 2021 Ageing Without Children (AWOC) was registered as a charity. Since 2021, the organisation has set up and run local groups, delivered webinars and face to face presentations, written articles and campaigned locally and nationally to improve care for those who are AWOC.

== Background ==
Women and men can be ageing without the support of children for many reasons. They may have chosen not to have children and are thus voluntarily childless or child free. They may have wanted children but been unable to have them for reasons of infertility, health/disability issues or because of social circumstances or financial pressures, thus being involuntarily childless. Some people may have children who predecease them or who have serious health issues themselves. Others may be estranged from their families or have children who live very far away and are thus unable to help. It is predicted that by 2030, in the UK, the number of people over 65 without children will be two million. An Office for National Statistics (ONS) report predicts that by 2045 there will be a threefold increase in the number of women who reach the age of 80 without children.

In the UK over 90% of unpaid care is provided by family, primarily people's partners and their children, rather than by the state or by private agencies. Thus, those without family support may well have problems with practical tasks such as shopping, visits to the doctors, dealing with technology and phone calls, as well as with advocacy within the health and legal systems. Since the UK population is ageing, the birth rate going down, funds for social care in England being limited and the number of people without family support increasing rapidly, AWOC considers it important that the government and other bodies recognise, and plan ahead to respond to, this growing group of people without future generation support.

== Objectives ==
AWOC would like to see a society where the growing numbers of people ageing without children or close family support can nevertheless age well and have a positive future life. AWOC thus campaigns to raise awareness of the assumptions made about ageing and childlessness. AWOC sets up local groups where people ageing without children can meet in-person and online to share experiences, support each other and access information and advice on relevant issues. AWOC also works in partnership with other relevant organisations and with academic researchers to develop a stronger knowledge base. This is used to influence local and national policy which is normally based on the assumption that older people have children able and willing to provide assistance.
