= Voluntary childlessness =

Lifestyle choice

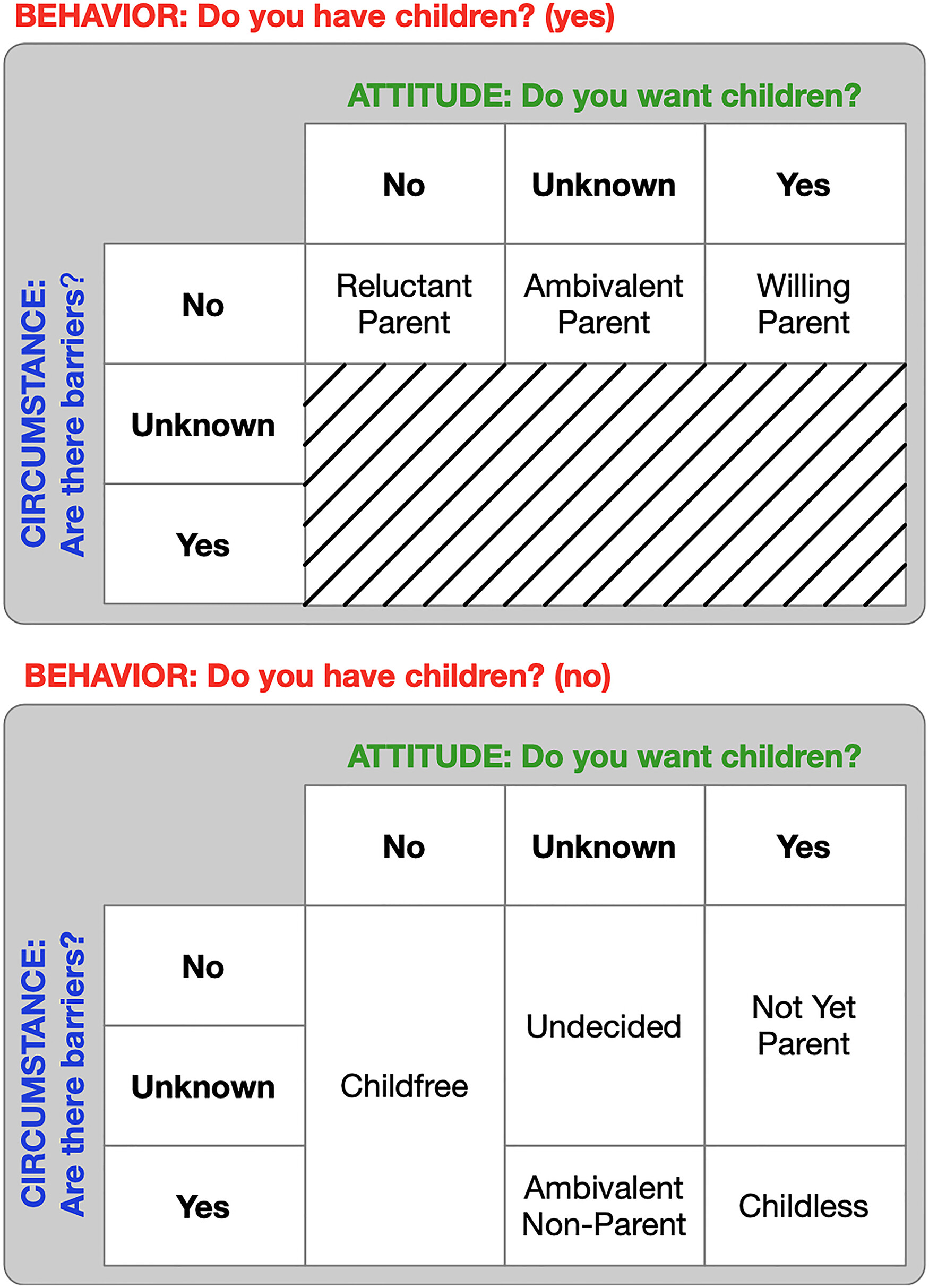
Classification of parents and non-parents on their attitudes and circumstances pertaining to having children

Voluntary childlessness or childfreeness is the choice to neither conceive nor adopt children. The use of the word childfree was first recorded in 1901 and entered common usage among second-wave feminists in the 1970s. The suffix -free refers to freedom and personal choice to choose not to have children.

The availability of reliable birth control, the desire for greater financial security, increased life expectancy, and the ability to rely on one's own savings have made voluntary childlessness more common. Attitudes toward voluntary childlessness varies significantly across cultures and regions, with differing levels of social acceptance and pronatalist expectations.

== Reasons and challenges ==
The reasons for being childfree depend on the individual, and it varies from personal, social, philosophical, moral, economic, or a combination thereof.

=== Fear or lack of interest ===
Some people simply dislike children's behavior, language, or biological processes. Others may experience fear or revulsion towards the physical condition of pregnancy (tokophobia) or the childbirth experience.

=== Adverse childhood experiences ===
People who have suffered child abuse by their own parents have a decreased interest in being a parent or proliferating their family's genes. They also fear the continuation of the cycle of abuse or other defects in parenting styles.

=== Other caretaking responsibilities ===
Some childfree people wish to spend time with the children in their family or to provide childcare and babysitting services. Some also take care of elderly parents.

Taking care of a pet can also be chosen in place of having children. In South Korea, young couples in the 2010s were more likely to have pets than children. The phrase "fur baby" was first introduced in the 1990s and steadily became more common afterwards as millennials came of age.

=== Medical concerns ===
Some childfree people carry genetic disorders, have a mental illness, or are considered uneligble for parenthood. Including healthy couples, new parents are often sleep-deprived.

Pregnancy and childbirth can come with complications and have a lasting effect on personal health. Effects include, but are not limited to, weight gain, hemorrhoids, urinary incontinence, accelerated cellular aging, and death. Substantial neurological changes in both parents during and post-pregnancy could lead to feelings of insecurity, inadequacy, or postpartum depression.

=== Economic factors ===
==== Cost ====
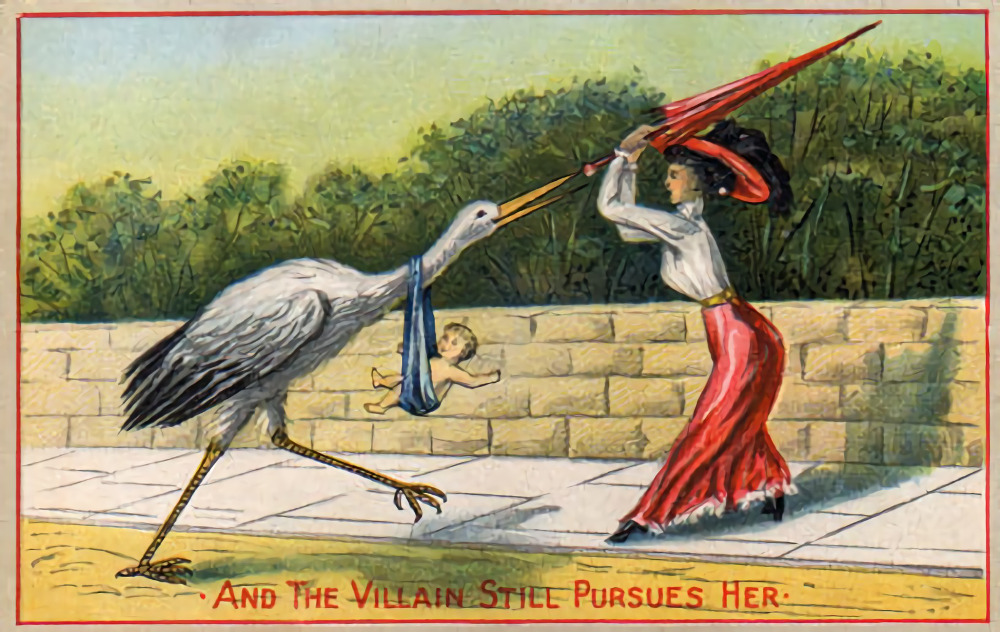
An early twentieth-century postcard of a woman fighting a stork bringing her a child.

The cost of raising a child may impact a person's decision to have a child. A lack of adequate support for working mothers is a major concern for women.

Childfree people might prioritize their career, retiring early, making charitable donations, having more leisure, or being more active in their community. For many people, children would be considered a distraction, an unwanted expenditure, or an undesirable commitment. Some find themselves too exhausted with work to be parents.

==== Pensions ====
Many countries have a pay-as-you-go pension system which depends on the total fertility rate to be sustainable. For these pension systems, low fertility rates are due to voluntary childlessness which can result in lower pensions, higher pension contributions, higher retirement ages, or a pension crisis. Higher pension contributions by voluntary childless individuals increases the sustainability of pay-as-you-go pension systems, such as in the German long-term care insurance. A German 2014 opinion poll found higher pension contributions by childless people was voted in favor of by 76.7%.

==== Taxes ====
Tax laws in some countries differentiate by number of children; for example, a tax on childlessness. Some have also questioned the fairness of tax credits for parents (such as the Earned Income Tax Credit in the United States), paid parental leave, and public education.

=== Ideology ===
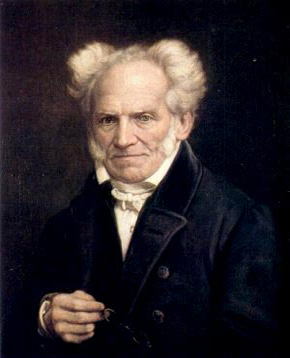
Antinatalists such as philosopher Arthur Schopenhauer argued that having children is inherently wrong.

Members of the countercultural or feminist movements in the 1960s and 1970s typically had no children. Some feminists consider the traditional family as "a decadent, energy-absorbing, destructive, wasteful institution." Similarly, in China, women have become much less interested in marriage and children, viewing these as burdens.

Another school of thought known as antinatalism asserts that it is inherently immoral to bring people into the world. In their view, refraining from reproduction is an act of compassion for the unborn. Since parents can never secure the consent of their unborn child, the decision to procreate would be an imposition of life, a source of suffering, and a form of narcissism.

=== Environmental concerns ===
The reduction of one's carbon footprint for various actions

Having fewer children or no children at all drastically reduces one's carbon emissions compared to other methods such as owning a fuel-efficient car or avoiding air travel. A subset of environmentalists opposes anthropocentrism and supports deep ecology. Some even call for voluntary human extinction, viewing it as an act of empathy. In their opinion, human existence inflicts harm not just upon humans themselves but also other species via predatory practices.

Some have argued that the conscientiousness of childfree environmentalists is self-eliminating since they only aid in the deterioration of concern for the environment and future generations, though this argument assumes that attitudes are heritable.

=== High expectations of parents ===
Modern societies often have high expectations of parents, which some people consider distasteful. In English, the (pejorative) term "soccer mom" is used to described women obsessed with being mothers. In general, as a society becomes better developed, it is generally true that parental investment per child goes up, causing fertility rates to go down. In countries where having children out of wedlock is either highly unusual or socially ostracized, such as China, having trouble getting married is a reason why most choose to not have children.

=== Traditions ===
It is traditionally held that womanhood must include motherhood and caregiving. Even during the 21st century, these responsibilities fall largely on women. Historically, it has been a social taboo to discuss the negative aspects of pregnancy and childbirth, or to express regret for having had children, making it more challenging for the childfree to defend their decision. A number of religions—including Judaism, Christianity, and Islam—place a high value on children and their central place in marriage. There are some debates within religious groups about whether a childfree lifestyle is acceptable. Another view, for example, is that the biblical verse "Be fruitful and multiply" in Genesis 1:28, is not a command but an expression of blessing.

Alternatively, some Christians believe that Genesis 1:28 is a moral command but nonetheless believe that voluntary childlessness is ethical if a higher ethical principle intervenes to make child bearing imprudent in comparison. Health concerns, a calling to serve orphans, serving as missionaries in a dangerous location, etc., are all examples that would make childbearing imprudent for a Christian.

=== Social pressure ===
People who express the fact that they have voluntarily chosen to remain childfree are frequently subjected to discrimination or pressure to change their minds. The decision not to have children has been derided as "unnatural" or attributed to insanity, and frequently childfree people are subjected to unsolicited questioning by friends, family, colleagues, acquaintances and even strangers who attempt to force them to justify and/or change their decision, for example, during holiday family gatherings.

Some women interviewed by the BBC have argued that revealing their decision to not have children was akin to coming out as gay in the mid-20th century, while others avoided such conversations to avoid social pressure to change their decision. Childfree women might be told to first have a child before deciding whether or not they do not want one, to "hurry up" and lower their standards for suitable men, that they would make good mothers, that they have not yet met the "right" man, or are assumed to be infertile rather than having made a conscious decision not to make use of their fertility. Many parents pressure their children into producing grandchildren and threaten to or actually disown them if they do not.

Some childfree people are accused of hating all children instead of just not wanting any themselves even though they might still be willing to help others rear their children. When seeking approval to be sterilized, some childfree individuals, especially women, might face intrusive questions from skeptical doctors or be dismissed completely in case they regret the decision. Some doctors ask their unmarried female patients the hypothetical question of them meeting men who want children or tell married women to first seek permission from their husbands.

While parents are generally warmer towards other parents, childfree individuals are neutral towards each other. With being uninterested in having children as the only thing in common, childfree people generally find it more challenging to organize for a social or political cause, with the possible exception of when they, as voters, are collectively threatened with discriminatory policies or the loss of family-planning resources.

While the idea of a childfree flight has become popular in the 2020s, with individuals even willing to pay extra, it is unlikely to be instituted by a major airline for reasons of public relations, regulations, and profit. On the other hand, this is not an issue for certain other venues, such as restaurants.

Most societies place a high value on parenthood in adult life, so that people who remain childfree are sometimes stereotyped as selfish, self-absorbed, or unwilling to take on responsibility. As Rebecca Solnit explains in her book The Mother of All Questions (2017), "The problem may be a literary one: we are given a single story line about what makes a good life, even though not a few who follow that story line have bad lives. We speak as though there is one good plot with one happy outcome, while the myriad forms a life can take flower—and wither—all around us."

Some are deemed too career-focused, although this is not necessarily true. In line with policies of family-friendliness, governments and employers typically offer support for parents, even though people without children might have to care for invalid, disabled, or elderly dependents, commitments that entail significant financial and emotional costs. The "life" aspect of the work-life balance is often taken to mean parenting. Non-parents, including the childfree, are thus assumed to be career-focused and willing to work extra time, which is not necessarily the case. What they do with their free time is not considered as important.

As such, childless individuals often work longer hours than parents. In fact, both parents and non-parents tend to think that parents are generally treated better at work. Some parents argue that they deserve special treatment for raising future workers and taxpayers. During the summer, requests for vacation leave from parents are typically approved quickly while the childfree are generally expected to stay behind to cover the workload. To alleviate friction and to maintain goodwill, some employers have offered everyone paid leave at the same time. More broadly, some human-resources departments and managers have introduced paid time off (PTO) to replace the traditional paid family leave, paid sick leave, or paid vacation leave.

In November 2024, Russia's legislative body, the Duma, voted unanimously to ban "childfree propaganda" to boost birthrates in the country. Russia is the first nation in the world to pass such a law.

== Politics ==
Childfree individuals do not necessarily share a unified political or economic philosophy, and most prominent childfree organizations tend to be social in nature. Childfree social groups first emerged in the 1970s and 1980s, most notable among them the National Alliance for Optional Parenthood and No Kidding! in North America where numerous books have been written about childfree people and where a range of social positions related to childfree interests have developed along with political and social activism in support of these interests. The term "childfree" was used in a July 3, 1972 Time article on the creation of the National Organization for Non-Parents. It was revived in the 1990s when Leslie Lafayette formed a later childfree group, the Childfree Network.

The Voluntary Human Extinction Movement (VHEMT, pronounced 'vehement') is an environmental movement that calls for all people to abstain from reproduction to cause the gradual voluntary extinction of humankind. Despite its name, the movement also includes those who do not necessarily desire human extinction but do want to curb or reverse human population growth in the name of environmentalism. VHEMT was founded in 1991 by Les U. Knight, an American activist who became involved in the American environmental movement in the 1970s and thereafter concluded that human extinction was the best solution to the problems facing the Earth's biosphere and humanity.

VHEMT supports human extinction primarily because, in the movement's view, it would prevent environmental degradation. The movement states that a decrease in the human population would prevent a significant amount of human-caused suffering. The extinctions of non-human species and the scarcity of resources required by humans are frequently cited by the movement as evidence of the harm caused by human overpopulation.

In Russia, the movement Childfree Russia has been equated with extremism. Individuals like its founder, Edward Lisovskii, have also been persecuted by the government.

Some governments have enacted policies to incentivize couples to have children, which critics have deemed unsuccessful due to a lack of increased birth rates.

== In popular culture ==
Television shows such as Friends (1994–2004), Seinfeld (1989–1998), and Sex and the City (1998–2004) have been cited as influential in normalizing childfreeness. The character Rust Cohle from the television series True Detective (2014–19), upholds the antinatalist philosophy.

The novel Olive (2020) by Emma Gannon includes several voluntarily childless characters.

== By region ==
=== World ===
The childfree lifestyle was recognized as a trend starting in 2014. In industrialized nations, 15% to 20% of women will never have children due to medical reasons, because they do not meet a suitable coparent, or by choice. Worldwide, higher educated women are statistically more likely to be childfree. As a result of the COVID-19 pandemic, people have become more willing to openly discuss the difficulties of parenting and to challenge the cultural assumptions about being childfree. In general, the prevalence of childfree individuals in a given country increases with its level of gender equality, political freedom, and human development. However, research on childlessness and parenthood has long focused on women's experiences, and men's perspectives are often overlooked.

Social scientists Jennifer Watling Neal and Zachary Neal classified non-parents into six mutually exclusive categories: not yet parents (those who want children and face no known obstacles), ambivalent (those who are unsure and face some barriers), undecided (unsure and facing no known problems), socially childless (those who want to be parents but face non-biological obstacles such as financial difficulties), biologically childless (people with fertility issues), and childfree (those who do not want to have children regardless of ability to do so).

In his analysis of search-engine data, data scientist Seth Stephens-Davidowitz discovered that parents are several times more likely to regret having children than adults without children to regret not having them. According to psychologist Paul Dolan, single childfree women are one of happiest population subgroup. (However, Dolan's conclusions about the relative happiness of mothers versus non-mothers have been disputed.)

Childfree people are significantly more likely to start or donate to charities, compared to parents or grandparents. Many also financially support the universities they attended.

=== Africa ===
Research on voluntary childlessness in African contexts remains limited compared with Europe and North America. Recent demographic research has identified measurable childfree populations across developing countries, including Africa, suggesting that voluntary childlessness is not limited to Western societies. Existing studies suggest that decisions to remain childfree are often shaped by interactions between personal preferences and strong pronatalist social expectations. In many African societies, parenthood continues to be closely associated with adulthood, family continuity, and social status. Studies comparing Africa and Europe have similarly identified stronger pronatalist expectations and lower acceptance of childlessness in the former. Cultural expectations surrounding marriage and reproduction continue to influence perceptions of childlessness across a number of African settings.

==== South Africa ====
Research on women living in South Africa has identified multiple reasons for choosing a childfree lifestyle, including career and educational aspirations, financial considerations, and the absence of suitable parenting partners. Participants in qualitative studies also reported navigating social expectations that linked womanhood to motherhood and described various strategies for responding to pressure from family and community members. Research involving voluntarily childfree lesbian women in South Africa found that participants frequently described their decision not to have children as a deliberate reproductive choice rather than a default consequence of sexual orientation. The study also reported that participants continued to encounter expectations surrounding motherhood despite legal and social changes that expanded reproductive options for the same-sex couples.

==== Nigeria ====
Studies conducted in Nigeria have found that voluntary childlessness remains relatively uncommon and is often viewed negatively within strongly pronatalist social environments. Participants associated parenthood with social status, lineage continuation, and religious responsibilities. Individuals who chose not to have children were frequently perceived as socially deviant, while involuntary childlessness was generally treated more sympathetically. Broader research on childlessness in Nigerian communities has reported both voluntary and involuntary childlessness may carry social consequences, including stigma reduced social recognition, and pressure from family members.

=== Asia ===
==== China ====
In China, the difficulty of reaching a work–life balance is a contributing factor to the nation's low fertility rate. Since the reforms to higher education in the 1990s, significantly more young people, a slight majority of whom women, have received a university degree. Consequently, many young women are now gainfully employed and financially secure. But traditional views on gender roles persist, and women are expected to be responsible for housework and childcare, regardless of their employment status. Workplace discrimination against women (with families) is commonplace; for example, an employer might be more skeptical towards a married woman with one child, fearing she might have another (as the one-child policy was rescinded in 2016) and take more maternity leave. Consequently, there is no strong incentive for young women to marry and have children. But men also face the trade-off between work and family.

The cost of living, especially of housing in the cities, is a serious obstacle to marriage. While the standard of living has improved overall, such improvement has been uneven. Although income has been rising, housing remains unaffordable for many young people. Because the traditional Chinese concept of marriage dictates housing is a prerequisite for marriage, especially for men, the housing shortage has led to a drop in marriage and birth rates.

In the early twenty-first century, the traditional concept of marriage has lost its value for the young. For example, while a traditional Chinese marriage secures inheritance and fulfills sexual needs under the constraints of traditional morality, today, premarital sex is no longer considered shameful or taboo. In addition, Chinese Millennials are skeptical of the institution of marriage. Because this is a country where having children out of wedlock is quite rare, this means that many young people are foregoing children. The "lying flat" movement, popular among Chinese youths, also extends to the domain of marriage and child-rearing. Over half of Chinese youths aged 18 to 26 said they were uninterested in having children because of the high cost of child-rearing, according to a 2021 poll by the Communist Youth League. On the Internet, statements such as "no marriage, no children will make life happier" make obvious their negative views of marriage and reproduction. Government attempts to boost birth rates, such as a tax on condoms or tracking women's menstrual cycles, have been met with indifference and derision.

Demographer Yi Fuxian estimated that China's fertility rate in 2025 was 0.98. China's population is rapidly aging. It is forecasted by that by the mid-twenty-first century, more than one-third of the population will be over 60 years of age. Of whom, more than 100 million will be over the age of 80. This means that there will be fewer than two working adults per senior citizen.

==== Japan ====
In Japan, while mothers are legally allowed to keep their careers, in practice, they are often forced to quit working, partly due a lack of support from their employers in the form of flexible working hours. For these reasons, many Japanese women are childfree.

==== Taiwan ====
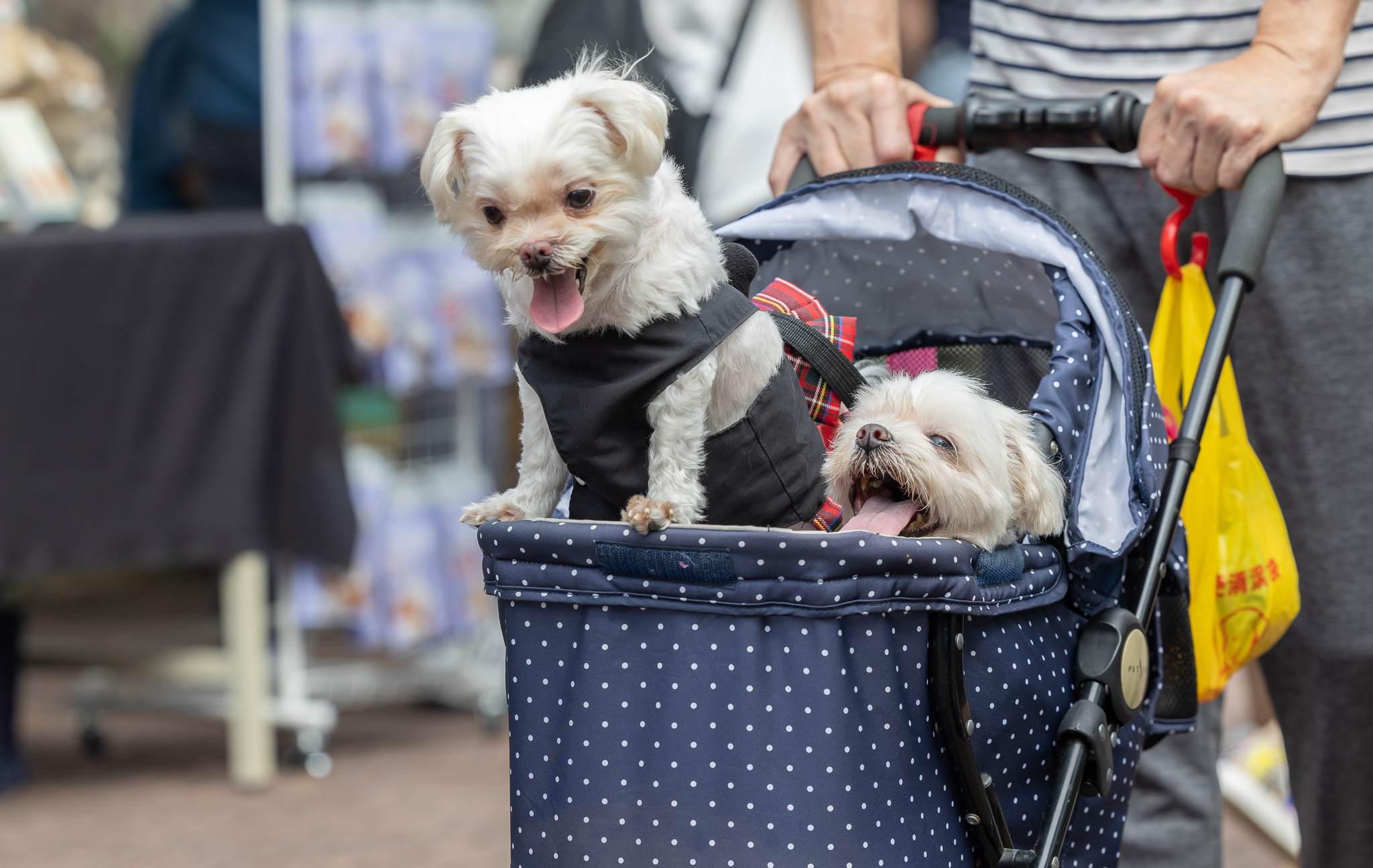
Two dogs in a stroller in Kaohsiung, Taiwan (2023). Some young Taiwanese prefer pets to children.

In Taiwan, it has become much more affordable for young couples to own pets instead of having children. In addition, those who want children face obstacles such as short maternity leaves and low wages. By 2020, Taiwan has become home to more pets than children.

==== South Korea ====
South Korea's low birth rate, as of the 2020s, is primarily due to avoidance of marriage and childbearing, a trend influenced by economic factors as well as cultural change. Among economic factors are the high cost of housing, the difficulty of finding a job, and job insecurity. In South Korea, the housing market is dominated by public or social housing, which has led a serious shortage. South Korea's comparatively high youth unemployment rate has injured the mental health of young people, and turning them away from marriage and children.

Contemporary South Korean youths no longer deem marriage to be necessary, while young women are increasingly unwilling to sacrifice their own needs and aspirations in order to help their husbands advanced their careers. Although a large share of South Korean women have received higher education, their workforce participation is not correspondingly high due to the motherhood penalty. Due to how they are treated at work and at home, young Korean women's desire to have children continues to decline. In addition, the heavy demands of Confucian family values have also led to a tense relationship between the rigid obligations of marital life and the socioeconomic reality of young people, making it challenging to reach a work–life balance. For this reason, married Korean women prefer to continue working and avoid pregnancy, while those who choose to be mothers typically prefer to have very few children.

==== Vietnam ====
As Vietnam continues to industrialize and urbanize, many couples have chosen to have fewer children, or none at all, especially in better developed and more densely populated places, such as Ho Chi Minh City, where the fertility rate fell to 1.45 in 2015, well below replacement. Rising cost of living and tiredness from work are among the reasons why. By 2023, polls show that significant numbers of married Vietnamese are choosing to not have children in order to focus on their lives and careers, or because they are wary of the demands of parenthood.

=== Europe ===
In Europe, childlessness among women aged 40–44 is most common in Austria, Spain and the United Kingdom (in 2010–2011). Among surveyed countries, childlessness was least common across Eastern European countries, especially Turkey, due to social pressure. However, even in these socially conservative nations, parents typically have only one child per couple.

==== Belgium ====
By March 2020, some 11% of Belgian women and 16% of Belgian men between the ages of 25 and 35 did not want children.

==== Germany ====
In the former West Germany, while childlessness was broadly tolerated, working mothers were dubbed "Rabenmutter" (raven mother). As a consequence, many gainfully employed women chose to have no children at all.

==== Netherlands ====
Children infringe on freedom	54%
Raising children takes too much time and energy	35%
Partner did not want children	28%
Hard to combine work and children	26%
No compelling need/unfit	23%
Health does not allow for children	18%
Children cost too much	7%
Hard to get child care	5%
Reasons why Dutch women chose not to have children, 2004

By 2004, 6 in 10 childless women are voluntarily childless. It showed a correlation between higher levels of education of women and the choice to be childfree, and the fact that women had been receiving better education in the preceding decades was a factor why an increasing number of women chose to be childfree. The two most important reasons for choosing not to have children were that it would infringe on their freedom and that raising children takes too much time and energy; many women who gave the second reason also gave the first.

By March 2017, reports showed that 22% of higher educated 45-year-old men were childless and 33% of lower educated 45-year-old men were childless. Childlessness amongst the latter was increasing, even though most of them were involuntarily childless. The number of voluntarily childless people amongst higher educated men had been increasing since the 1960s, whilst voluntary childlessness amongst lower educated men (who tended to have been raised more traditionally) did not become a rising trend until the 2010s.

By March 2020, 10% of 30-year-old Dutch women questioned had not had children out of her own choice, and did not expect to have any children anymore either; furthermore, 8.5% of 45-year-old women questioned and 5.5% of 60-year-old women questioned stated that they had consciously remained childless.

Raising a child cost an average of €120,000 from birth to age 18, or about 17% of one's disposable income as of 2019.

==== Russia ====
By October 2020, some 7% of population between the ages of 18 and 45 did not want children, and this figure reached 20% within Moscow population. Most often, educated, wealthy and ambitious people refuse to have children. They are unwilling to sacrifice their comfort and career for the sake of their children. As a consequence of the ongoing Russo-Ukrainian War, a combination of battlefield losses and emigration has led the Russian government to be more concerned about the nation's birth rate. In 2024 Russian president Vladimir Putin signed a law prohibiting "childfree propaganda" as an attempt to curb the declining birth rate. Abortion has also been restricted.

==== Sweden ====
According to a 2019 study amongst 191 Swedish men aged 20 to 50, 39 were not fathers and did not want to have children in the future either (20.4%). Desire to have (more) children was not related to level of education, country of birth, sexual orientation or relationship status.

Some Swedish men 'passively' choose not to have children as they feel their life is already good as it is, adding children is not necessary, and they do not have to counter the same amount of social pressure to have children as childfree women do.

==== United Kingdom ====
Women under the age of 30 with no children have been seeking to be sterilized (by tubal ligation) in growing numbers; some even do so as soon as they reach the age of majority. Only about one in ten regret doing so in their middle age. A poll released in January 2020 revealed that among Britons who were not already parents, 37% told pollsters they did not want any children ever. 19% said they did not want children but might change their minds in the future and 26% were interested in having children. Those who did not want to be parents included 13% of people aged 18 to 24, 20% of those aged 25 to 34, and 51% aged 35 to 44. Besides age (23%), the most popular reasons for not having children were the potential impact on lifestyles (10%), high costs of living and raising children (10%), human overpopulation (9%), dislike of children (8%), and lack of parental instincts (6%).

Whereas in the past, it was taboo to declare that one does not want children, this decision is now increasingly common and accepted in British society. Research by different social scientists have concluded that the growing number of childfree Britons is due not necessarily to economic constraints but rather changing cultural attitudes and expectations. One result of being child free is that individuals may lack practical support as they age. A UK charity, Ageing Without Children, set up in 2021, explores this situation.

=== North America ===
==== Canada ====
In 2010, around half of Canadian women without children in their 40s had decided not to have any from an early age. During the early 2020s, close to a fifth of Canadian women aged 50 and over had no biological children, and neither did the majority of those under 40. A 2023 report by Statistics Canada states that over a third of Canadians aged 18 to 49 do not want to have children. Many are also delaying having children or want to have fewer children than their predecessors.

Pursuit of higher education, unaffordable housing, economic precariousness, and the rising cost of living are among the reasons why. These trends have accelerated in the aftermath of the COVID-19 pandemic. Like the case in other countries, there is a generational gap in attitudes towards reproduction. Baby boomers are more likely to consider raising (grand) children to be a source of fulfillment or the glue that holds a marriage together. Fewer young Canadians share this view. Moreover, while Canadians today are more tolerant towards the idea of not having children, many seniors still struggle with this decision coming from their own family members.

In Canada, childfree venues are growing in popularity, including among parents who, despite loving their children, would like to spend some time away from them on occasions.

==== United States ====
Being a childfree American adult was considered unusual in the 1950s. The proportion of voluntarily childfree adults in the population has increased significantly since then. In 2010, about one of five American women exited their fertile years without having had a child, compared to one in ten in the 1970s. A 2025 study from Michigan State University (MSU) revealed that the number of non-parents who do not want to have children roughly doubled between 2002 and 2023, from 13.8% to 29.4%. Another MSU study found that California, Michigan, and New Hampshire had the highest percentage of childfree residents, whereas North Dakota, South Dakota, and Louisiana the lowest. However, individual traits were found to be better predictors of being childfree than residency. The strongest predictors included being male, single, and older. A different study discovered that older women with no children tended to be wealthier, more experienced in the workplace, and less religious compared to other women.

Despite persisting discrimination against especially women who chose to have no children, acceptance of this choice has been gradually increasing. Overall, the importance of having children has declined across all age groups in the United States, especially the young. According to 2023 Pew poll, the share of American 12th graders who would like to have children one day had fallen by 9 percentage points compared to 1993. The Pew Research Center also found that in 2023, a clear majority of Americans thought that it was completely or somewhat acceptable for a married couple to choose to not have children (81 percent), making it the second most approved family type, behind a married couple raising children together (93 percent). A 2024 study by the Centers for Disease Control and Prevention (CDC), found that only about 3% of American adults are involuntarily childless.

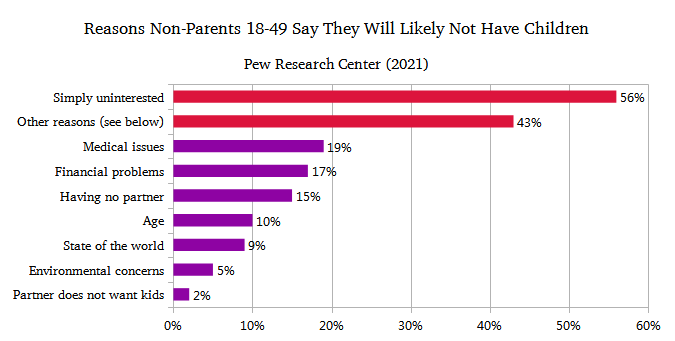
A growing share of American adults does not want to have children.

About a third of childfree Americans identify as gay, lesbian, or bisexual. However, voluntary childlessness in the United States has been more common among higher educated women, but not higher educated men. A 2021 survey by the Pew Research Center found that the number of non-parents aged 18 to 49 who said they were not too likely or not at all likely to have children was 44%, up seven points compared to 2018. Among these people, 56% said they simply did not want to have children.

Student debts, a serious problem among millennials and Generation Z in the United States, discourage many from having children. Close to a quarter of these cohorts do not want to have children. Some estimates also suggest that approximately one out of every four Americans are childfree, or three times the number of those who are childless. Although concerns over climate change and financial security are commonly cited as reasons, the most popular reasons, according to various surveys, are personal independence, more leisure time, and a preference to focus on one's education and career.

More women are choosing to have no children at all, regardless of marital status. In the early 1970s, single women in their thirties who had never been unemployed since graduation even earned slightly more money than men in the same category. By 2019, among single people, women without children made more money than men without children or men and women who were parents. Many Millennials and members of Generation Z have chosen to have pets in lieu of children, and they frequently refer to these animals as members of their families or their own children ("fur babies").

In the U.S., although being voluntarily childless or childfree is not without its disadvantages, such as higher taxes, fewer affordable housing options, and concern of old age, parenthood continues to lose its appeal. After the 2022 Supreme Court decision Dobbs v. Jackson Women's Health Organization, which returned the right to regulate aspects of abortion not covered by federal law to the individual states, the number of young and childfree adults seeking sterilization went up. Previously, it was usually middle-aged fathers who obtained vasectomies. Now, many young adults (aged 18 to 30) are seeking to be sterilized (vasectomies for men and tubal ligation for women). This uptick in sterilization was most pronounced in socially conservative states, where people are concerned that abortion, and even contraception and sterilization, could be restricted or banned.

=== Oceania ===
==== New Zealand ====
It is estimated that the share of childfree women grew from under 10% in 1996 to around 15% in 2013. Professional women were the most likely to be without children, at 16%, compared with 12% for manual workers. At least 5% of women were childfree by choice.

== See also ==
- Abortion-rights movements
- Antinatalism
- Criticism of marriage
- DINK
- Fertility and intelligence
- Infertility and childlessness stigmas
- John B. Calhoun#Mouse experiments
- Old-age dependency ratio
- Population ageing
- Sexual abstinence
- Singleton (lifestyle)

International:

- N-po generation, Korea
  - 4B movement, Korea
- Satori generation, Japan

=== Antonyms ===
- Natalism
- Parent
- Quiverfull
