= List of gay, lesbian or bisexual people: N–O =

This is a partial list of notable people who were or are gay men, lesbian or bisexual.

The historical concept and definition of sexual orientation varies and has changed greatly over time; for example the general term "gay" wasn't used to describe sexual orientation until the mid 20th century. A number of different classification schemes have been used to describe sexual orientation since the mid-19th century, and scholars have often defined the term "sexual orientation" in divergent ways. Indeed, several studies have found that much of the research about sexual orientation has failed to define the term at all, making it difficult to reconcile the results of different studies. However, most definitions include a psychological component (such as the direction of an individual's erotic desire) and/or a behavioural component (which focuses on the sex of the individual's sexual partner/s). Some prefer to simply follow an individual's self-definition or identity.

The high prevalence of people from the West on this list may be due to societal attitudes towards homosexuality. The Pew Research Center's 2013 Global Attitudes Survey found that there is “greater acceptance in more secular and affluent countries,” with "publics in 39 countries [having] broad acceptance of homosexuality in North America, the European Union, and much of Latin America, but equally widespread rejection in predominantly Muslim nations and in Africa, as well as in parts of Asia and in Russia. Opinion about the acceptability of homosexuality is divided in Israel, Poland and Bolivia.” As of 2013, Americans are divided – a majority (60 percent) believes homosexuality should be accepted, while 33 percent disagree.

== N ==
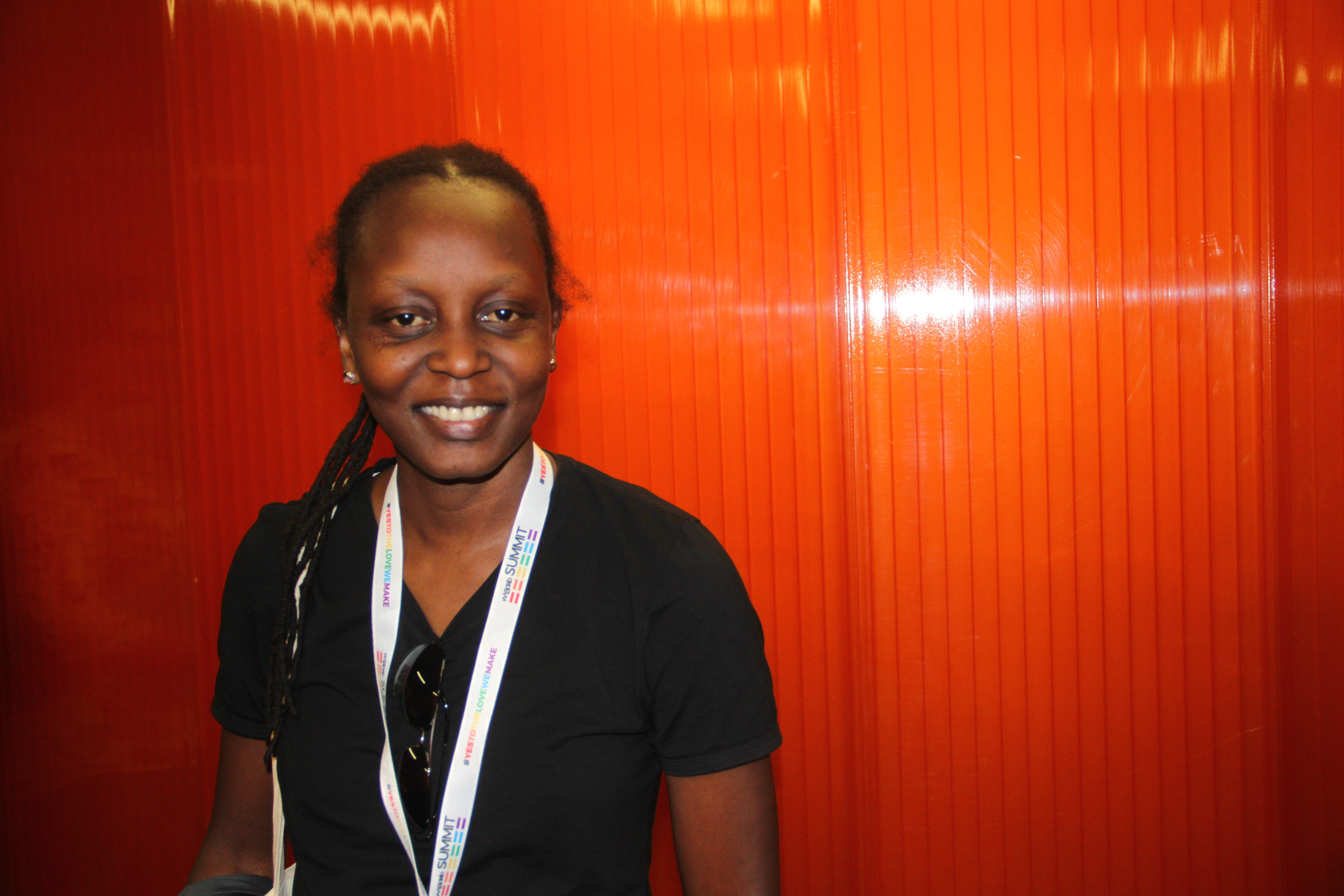
Activist Kasha Nabagesera

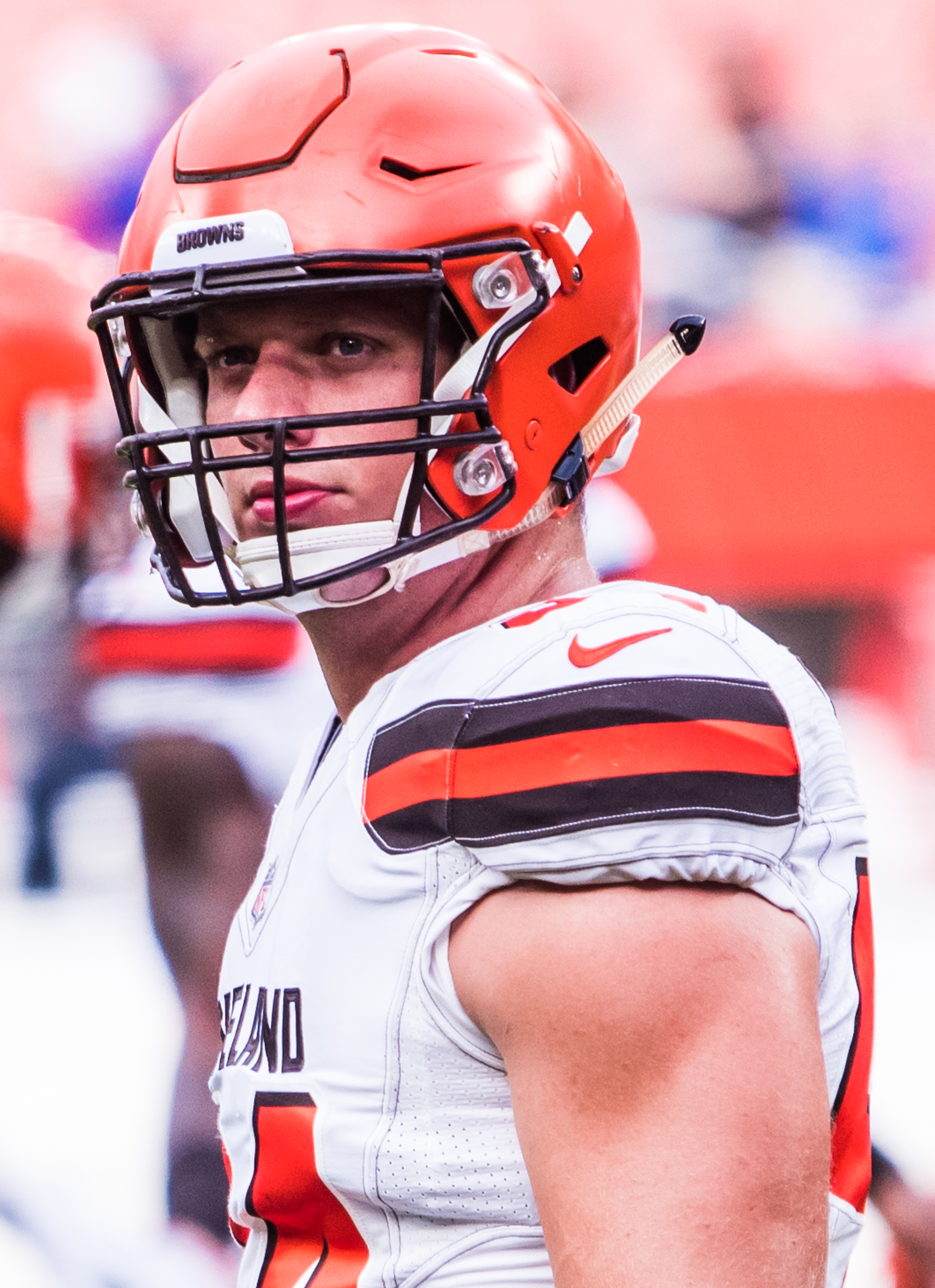
Football player Carl Nassib

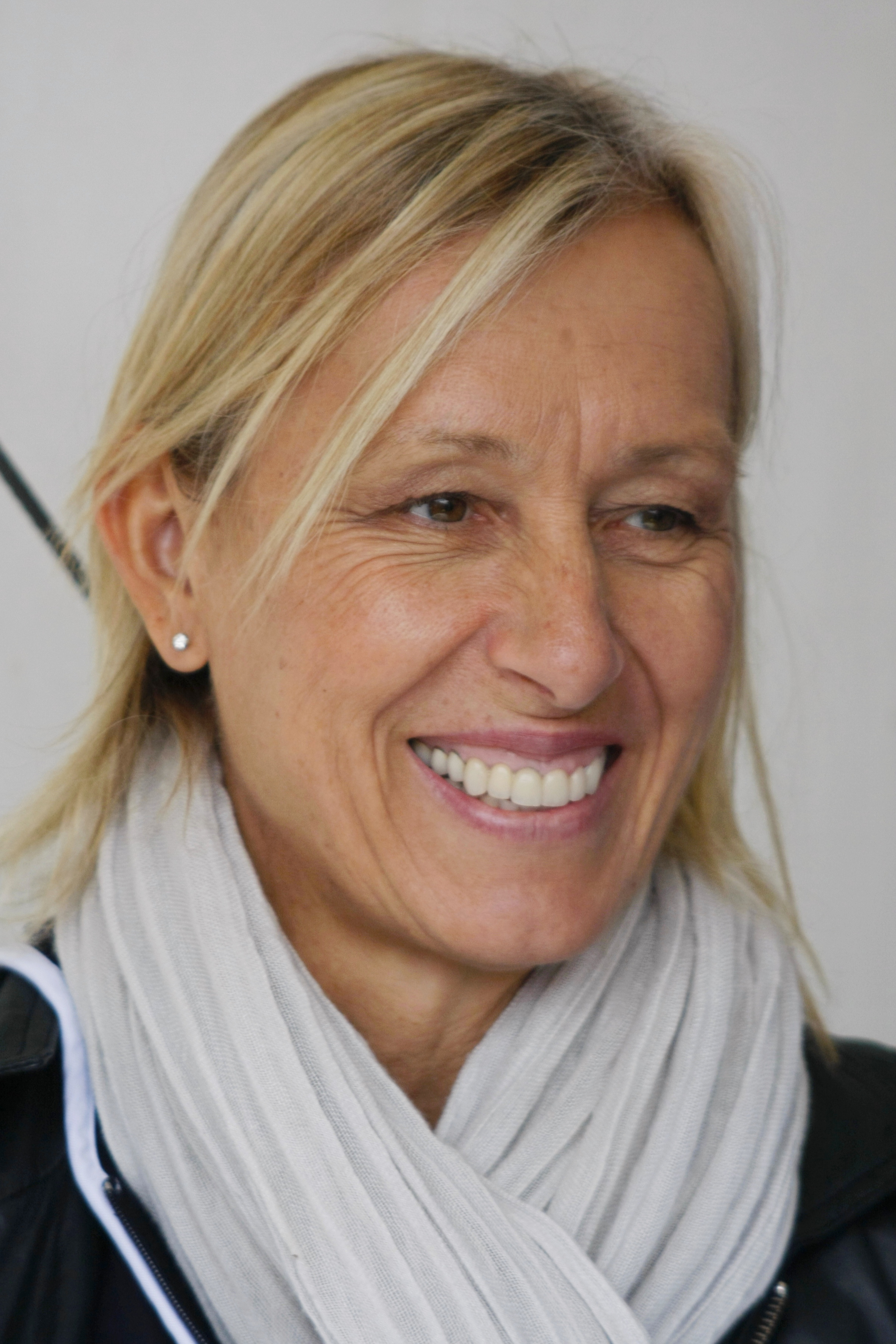
Tennis player Martina Navratilova

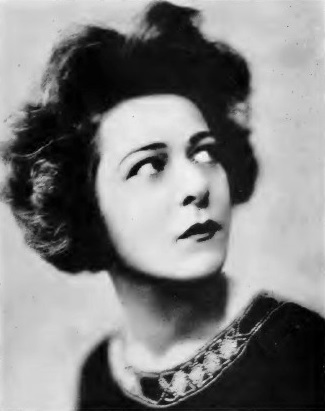
Actress Alla Nazimova

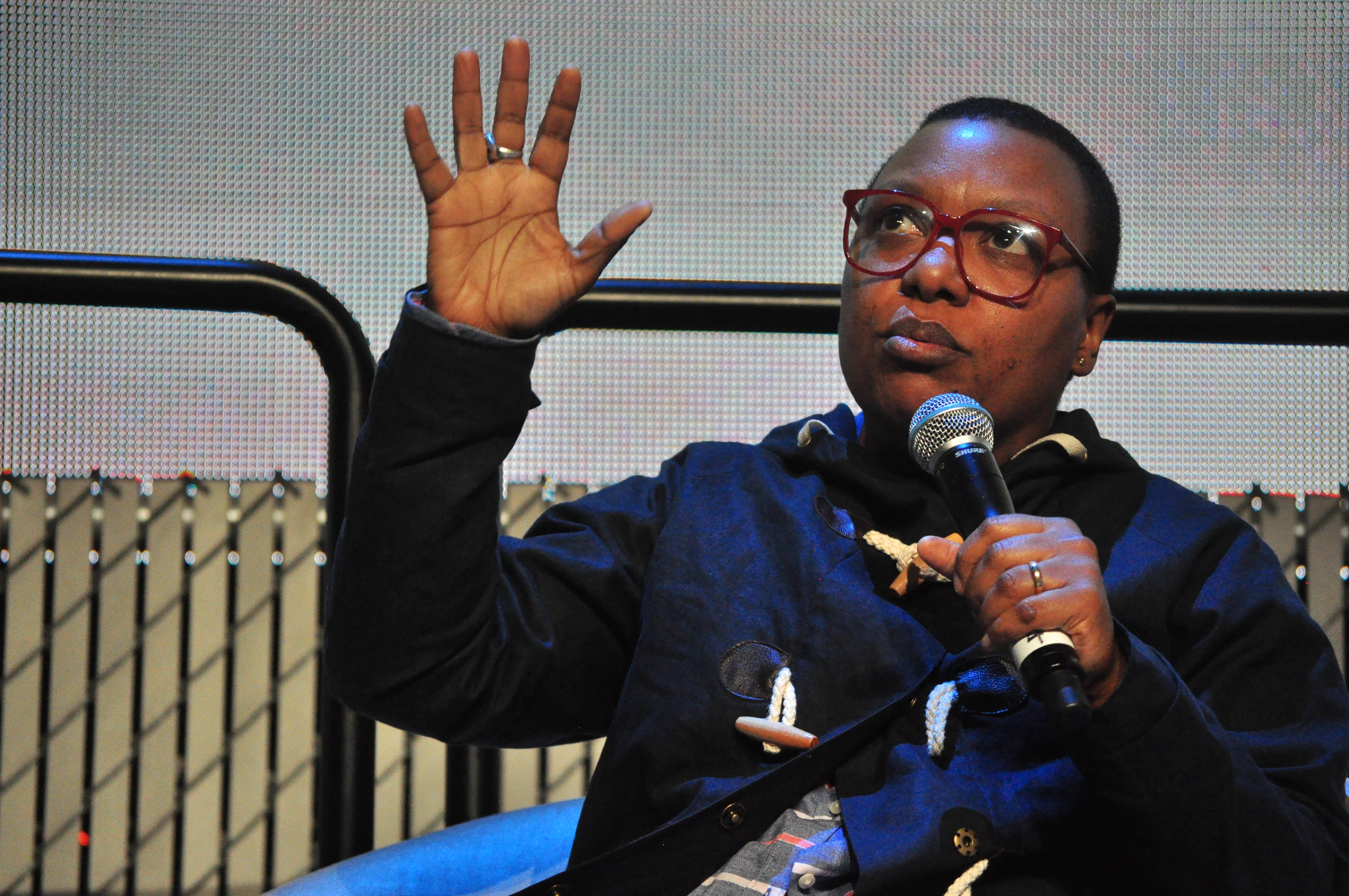
Singer-songwriter and bassist Meshell Ndegeocello

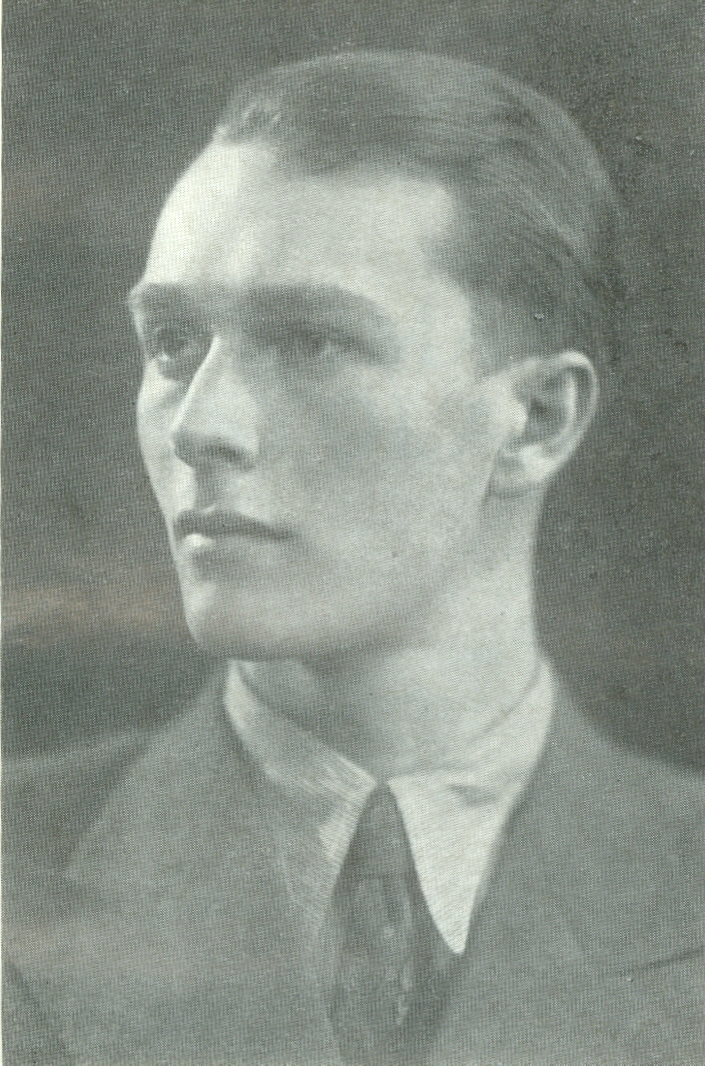
Literary historian, critic, poet, novelist and memoirist Ion Negoițescu

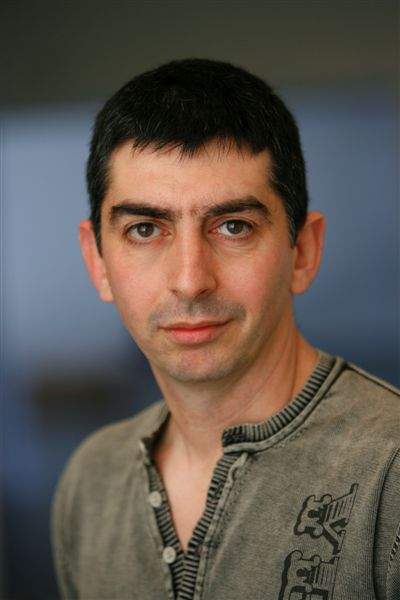
Photographer Adi Nes

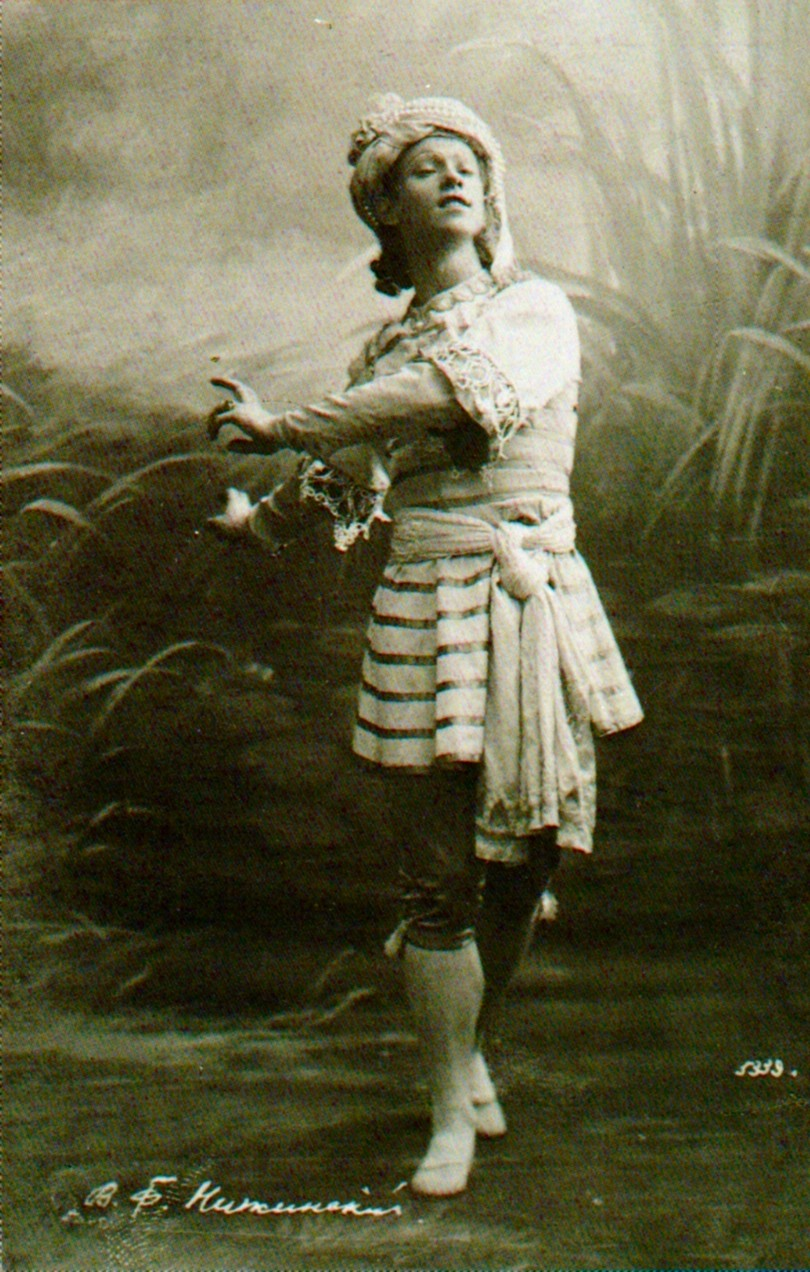
Ballet dancer and choreographer Vaslav Nijinsky

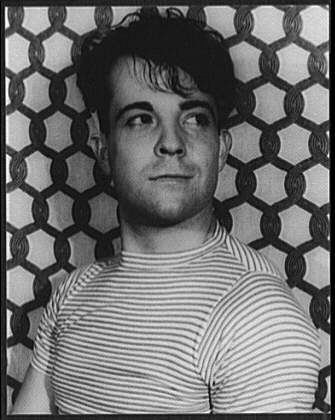
Actor Ramon Novarro

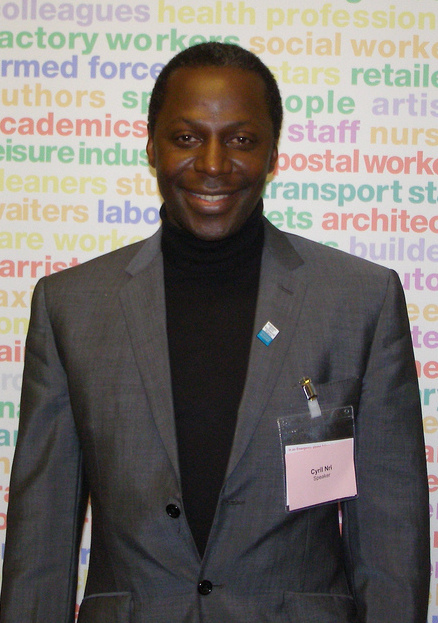
Actor Cyril Nri

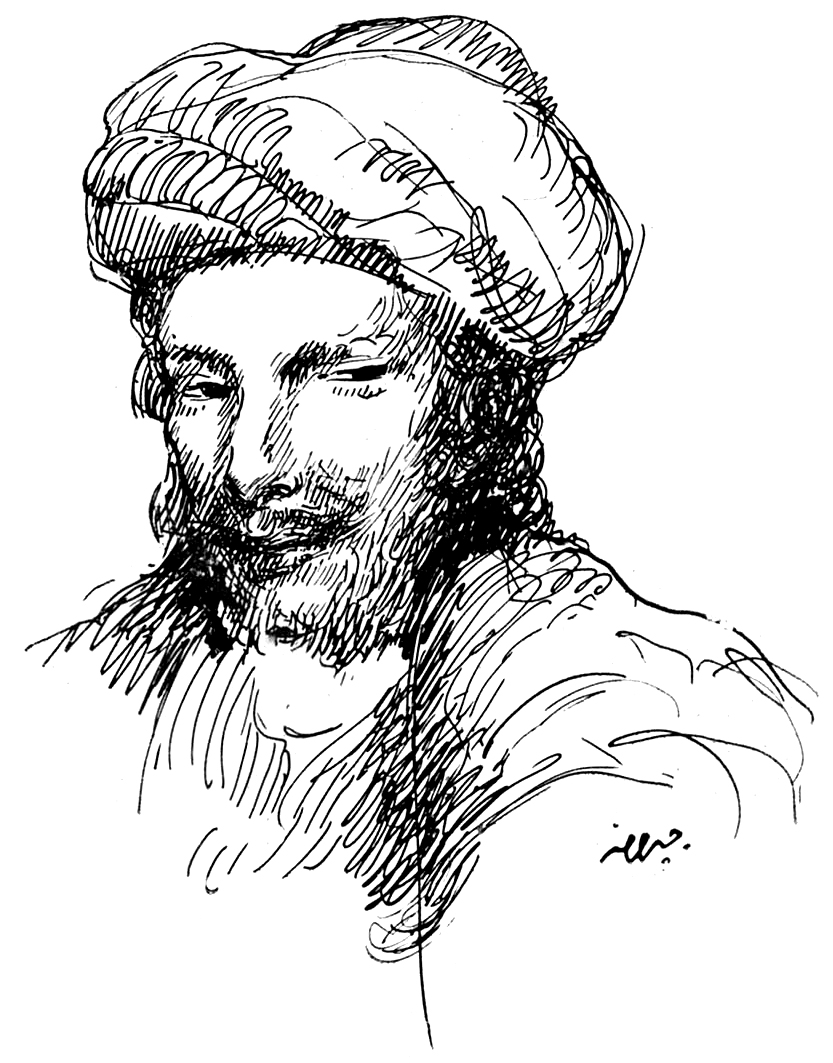
Classical poet Abu Nuwas

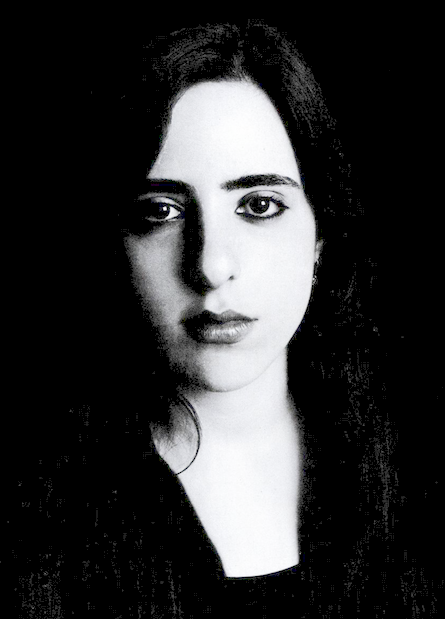
Singer Laura Nyro

Name	Lifetime	Nationality	Notable as	Notes
Kasha Nabagesera	b. 1980	Ugandan	Activist	L
Albert Nabonibo	b. 1983/1984	Rwandan	Gospel singer	G
Jim Nabors	1930–2017	American	Actor, singer	G
Ádám Nádasdy	b. 1947	Hungarian	Linguist, poet, professor	G
George Nader	1921–2002	American	Actor	G
Jüri Nael	b. 1975	Estonian	Choreographer, theatre pedagogue	G
Timothy Naftali	b. 1962	Canadian-American	Historian, professor	G
Kabi Nagata	b. ?	Japanese	Manga writer, artist	L
Reut Naggar	b. 1983	Israeli	Social activist, entrepreneur, politician	L
Adam Nagourney	b. 1954	American	Journalist	G
Leigh-Ann Naidoo	b. 1976	South African	Beach volleyball player	L
Steven Naifeh	b. 1952	American	Writer	G
Kristian Nairn	b. 1975	Northern Irish	Actor, DJ	G
Rune Naito	1932–2007	Japanese	Artist, illustrator, writer, designer	G
Kathy Najimy	b. 1957	American	Actor	B
Lynn Nakamoto	b. 1960	American	Judge	G
Mia Nakano	b. ?	American	Photographer, filmmaker, educator, activist	L
Niki Nakayama	b. 1975	American	Chef, restaurateur	L
Bif Naked	b. 1971	Canadian	Musician, actor	B
Leonardo Nam	b. 1979	Korean-Australian	Actor	G
Billy Name	b. 1940	American	Photographer	G
Hasan Namir	b. 1987	Iraqi-Canadian	Writer	G
Suniti Namjoshi	b. 1941	Indian	Poet, author, activist	L
Joël Gustave Nana Ngongang	1982–2015	Cameroonian	LGBT and HIV rights activist	G
Elías Nandino	1900–1993	Mexican	Poet	G
Marco Nanini	b. 1948	Brazilian	Actor	G
Gianna Nannini	b. 1954	Italian	Singer	B
Simon Napier-Bell	b. 1939	English	Record producer, music manager (The Yardbirds, Wham!), author, journalist	G
Maique Nascimento	b. 1997	Brazilian	Volleyball player	G
Niecy Nash	b. 1970	American	Actor	B
Ifti Nasim	1946–2011	Pakistani	Poet, journalist, LGBT activist	G
Carl Nassib	b. 1993	American	American football player	G
John Nathan-Turner	1947–2002	English	TV producer	G
Michael Nava	b. 1954	American	Writer	G
Samantha Navarro	b. 1971	Uruguayan	Singer-songwriter, guitarist	L
Yves Navarre	1940–1994	French	Writer	G
Tony Navarrete	b. ?	American	Politician	G
Martina Navratilova	b. 1956	Czech	Tennis player	L
Ezra Nawi	1951–2021	Israeli	Human rights activist	G
Guillermina Naya	b. 1996	Argentine	Tennis player	L
Lisa Naylor	b. ?	Canadian	Politician	L
Abdi Nazemian	b. ?	Iranian-American	Author, screenwriter, film producer	G
Alla Nazimova	1879–1945	Russian-American	Actor	B
Meshell Ndegeocello	b. 1968	American	Singer-songwriter, bassist	B
Scott Neal	b. 1978	English	Actor	G
Fabrice Neaud	b. 1968	French	Comics artist	G
Ted Nebbeling	1943/44–2009	Canadian	Politician	G
Dejan Nebrigić	1970–1999	Serbian	LGBT rights and peace activist, writer, theatre critic	G
Gisela Necker	1932–2011	German	Lesbian activist	L.
Sharon Needles (stage name)	b. 1981	American	Drag performer	G
Louis Negin	b. ?	Canadian	Actor, playwright	G
Ion Negoițescu	1921–1993	Romanian	Literary historian, critic, poet, novelist, memoirist	G
Luis Negrón	b. 1970	Puerto Rican	Writer	G
Taylor Negron	1957–2015	American	Actor, comedian, painter, playwright	G
Frances Negrón-Muntaner	b. 1966	Puerto Rican	Filmmaker	L
Kenneth Nelson	1930–1993	American	Actor	G
Travis Nelson	b. 1990	Canadian	Actor	G
Ondrej Nepela	1951–1989	Slovak	Figure skater	G
Steffi Nerius	b. 1972	German	Javelin thrower	L
Adi Nes	b. 1966	Israeli	Photographer	G
Patrick Ness	b. 1971	British-American	Author, journalist, lecturer, screenwriter	G
Dana Nessel	b. 1969	American	Attorney General of Michigan, first openly LGBT person elected to statewide office in Michigan.	L
Donna Nesselbush	b. 1962	American	Politician, lawyer, judge	L
Joan Nestle	b. 1940	American	Activist, writer	L
Rivka Neumann	b. 1956	Israeli	Actor	L
John Neumeier	b. 1939	American	Ballet dancer, choreographer	G
Chris New	b. 1981	English	Actor	G
Daniel Newman	b. 1981	American	Actor, model, musician	B
Lesléa Newman	b. 1955	American	Writer	L
Robert Newton	b. 1981	English	Athlete	G
Billy Newton-Davis	b. 1951	Canadian	Musician	G
Benny Neyman	1951–2008	Dutch	Pop singer	G
Win Ng	1936–1991	American	Artist, entrepreneur, decorative designer	G
Cindy Ngamba	b. 1998	British-Cameroonian	Boxer	L
Roy Ngerng	b. 1981	Singaporean	Activist, politician, blogger	G
Bao Nguyen	b. 1980	American	Politician	G
Derek Nguyen	b. 1973	Vietnamese-American	Filmmaker, playwright	G
Hieu Minh Nguyen	b. ?	Vietnamese-American	Poet	G
Thai Nguyen	b. 1980	Vietnamese-American	Fashion designer, TV personality	G
Fred Nicácio	b. 1987	Brazilian	Doctor, TV presenter, physical therapist, digital influencer	G
Sheila Nicholls	b. 1970	English	Musician	L
Beverley Nichols	1898–1983	English	Playwright, actor, novelist, composer	G
Charlotte Nichols	b. 1991	English	Politician	B
Jack Nichols	1938–2005	American	Writer, LGBT rights activist	G
Anne-Marie Nicholson	b. 1991	English	Singer-songwritier	B
Bruce William Nickerson	b. 1941	American	Lawyer	G
Jasika Nicole	b. 1980	American	Actor	L
Daniel Nicoletta	b. 1954	American	Photographer, LGBT rights activist	G
Harold Nicolson	1886–1968	English	Diplomat, author	B
John Nicolson	b. 1961	Scottish	Journalist, broadcaster, politician	G
Anthony Niedwiecki	b. 1967	American	Law professor, LGBT activist, politician	G
Marlene van Niekerk	b. 1964	South African	Author, educator	L
Szymon Niemiec	b. 1977	Polish	Photographer, activist, journalist, politician	G
Pepón Nieto	b. 1967	Spanish	Actor	G
Deke Nihilson	b. 1968	American	Musician, anarchist	G
Vaslav Nijinsky	1889–1950	Russian-Polish	Ballet dancer, choreographer	B
Alwin Nikolais	1910–1993	American	Dancer, choreographer, composer	G
Aleksandr Nikolayev	1897–1957	Russian	Painter	G
Dennis Nilsen	b. 1945	Scottish	Serial killer	G
Ingrid Nilsen	b. 1989	American	YouTube personality	L
Anaïs Nin	1903–1977	American	Diarist	B
Alberto Nin Frías	1878–1937	Uruguayan	Writer, lecturer, diplomat	G
Willi Ninja	1961–2006	American	Dancer, choreographer	G
Maria Nirod	1879–1965	Russian	Countess, nurse	L
Grizel Niven	1906–2007	English	Sculptor	L
Piper Niven	b. ?	Scottish	WWE professional wrestler	B
Cynthia Nixon	b. 1966	American	Actor	B
Simon Nkoli	1957–1998	South African	AIDS and LGBT rights activist	G
MK Nobilette	b. 1993	American	Singer, reality TV personality	L
Elaine Noble	b. 1944	American	Politician, activist	L
Camila Nobre	b. 1988	Brazilian	Footballer and futsal player	L
Claude Nobs	1936–2013	Swiss	Businessman	G
Barbara Noda	b. 1953	American	Poet, author	L
John Noguez	b. 1964	American	Politician	G
Noxolo Nogwaza	1987–2011	South African	LGBT rights activist, hate crime murder victim	L
Anna Nolan	b. 1970	Irish	TV presenter	L
Faith Nolan	b. 1957	Canadian	Singer, songwriter	L
Richard T. Nolan	b. 1937	American	Philosopher, Episcopal Canon, Author	L
Lou B. ("Bink") Noll	1927–1986	American	Poet	L
Jacques Nolot	b. 1943	French	Actor, filmmaker	G
Klaus Nomi	1944–1983	German	Singer	G
Franz Nopcsa von Felső-Szilvás	1877–1933	Hungarian	Aristocrat, adventurer, scholar, paleontologist	G
Bente Nordby	b. 1974	Norwegian	Footballer	L
Siiri Nordin	b. 1980	Finnish	Musician	L
Roger Nordin	b. 1977	Swedish	Radio and TV presenter, journalist	G
Pat Norman	b. 1939	American	Activist, community organizer, founder of Lesbian Mothers Union	L
Peg Norman	b. 1964	Canadian	Filmmaker, politician	L
Sarah White Norman	1623–1654	American	Prosecuted for "lewd behavior with [Mary Vincent Hammon] upon a bed"	L
John Normington	1937–2007	English	Actor	G
Bobby Cole Norris	b. 1986	English	Television personality	G
Colin Norris	b. 1976	English	Serial killer	G
David Norris	b. 1944	Irish	Civil rights campaigner	G
Harold Norse	1916–2009	American	Writer	G
Kevin and Don Norte	b. 1962	American	Politicians	G
William North	1755–1836	American	Soldier and politician	B
Graham Norton	b. 1963	Irish	Talk show host, comedian, actor	G
Keith Norton	b. 1941	Canadian	Politician	G
Scott Norton	b. 1982	American	Professional bowler, attorney	G
Nailea Norvind	b. 1970	Mexican	Actor	B
Dries van Noten	b. 1958	Belgian	Fashion designer	G
Bruce Notley-Smith	b. ca 1964	Australian	Politician	G
Ramón Novarro	1899–1968	Mexican	Actor	G
Ivor Novello	1893–1951	Welsh	Actor, composer, musician	G
Salvador Novo	1904–1974	Mexican	Poet, playwright	G
Jana Novotná	1968–2017	Czech	Tennis player	L
Peter Nowalk	b. ?	American	TV writer, producer	G
Tegan Nox	b. 1994	Welsh	Professional wrestler	B
Cyril Nri	b. 1961	Nigerian-British	Actor	G
Richard Bruce Nugent	1906–1987	American	Author	G
Yared Nuguse	b. 1999	American	Middle-distance runner	G
Amanda Nunes	b. 1988	Brazilian-American	Mixed martial artist	L
Rudolf Nureyev	1938–1993	Russian	Ballet dancer, choreographer	G
Abu Nuwas	756–814	Arab-Persian	Classical Arabic poet	G
Katja Nyberg	b. 1979	Norwegian	Handball player	L
Diana Nyad	b. 1949	American	Swimmer	L
Laura Nyro	1947–1997	American	Singer, songwriter	B
Ron Nyswaner	b. 1956	American	Screenwriter, film director	G
Denis Nzioka		Kenyan	Journalist, LGBT activist	G

A · Ba–Bh · Bi–Bz · C · D · E · F · G · H · I · J · K · L · M · N · O
P · Q · R · Sa–Sc · Sd–Si · Sj–Sz · T · U · V · W · X · Y · Z

== O ==
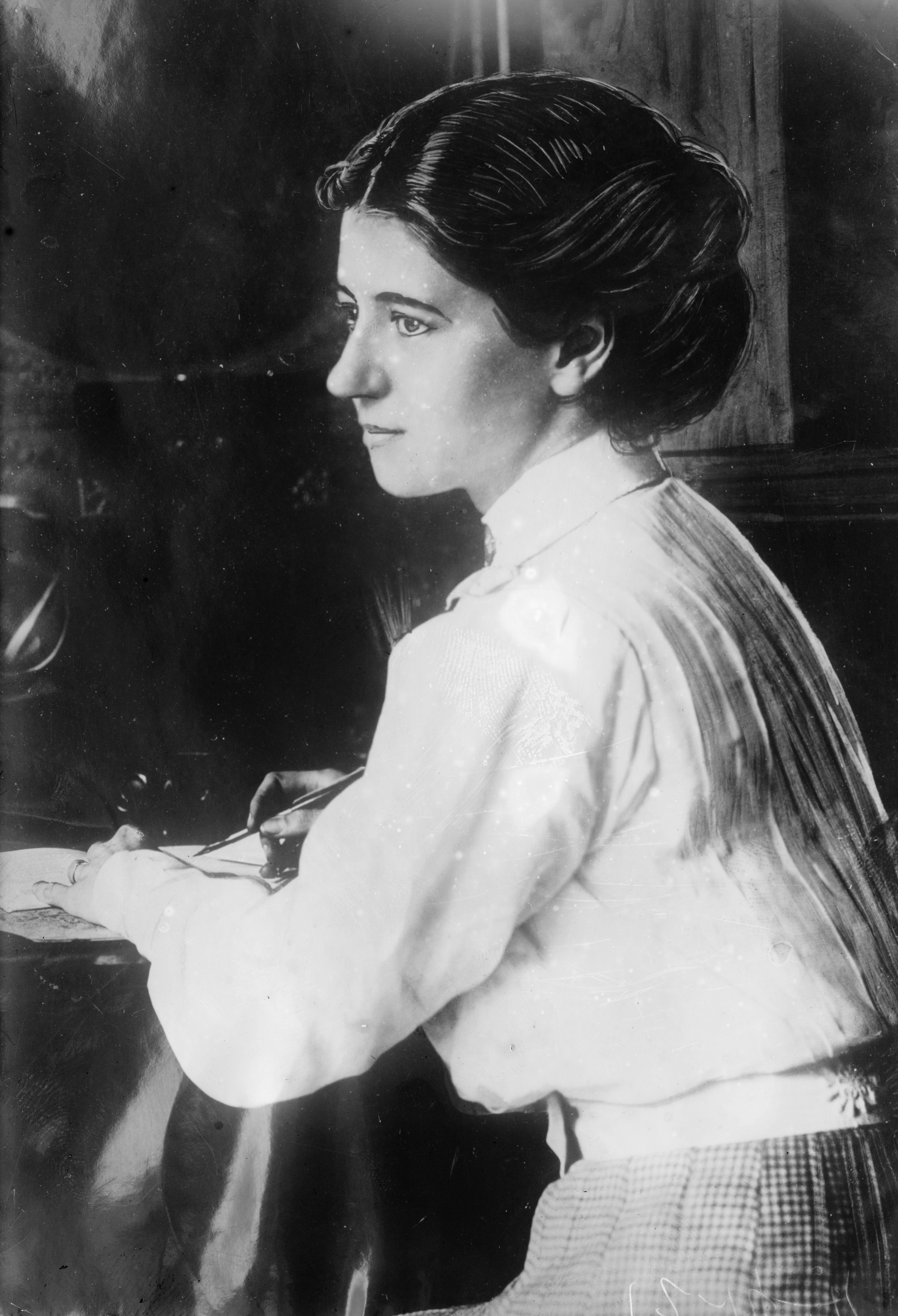
Artist Violet Oakley

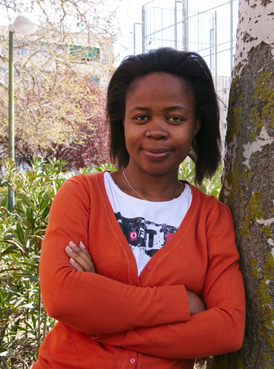
Novelist, political scientist, academic and LGBTQI rights activist Trifonia Melibea Obono

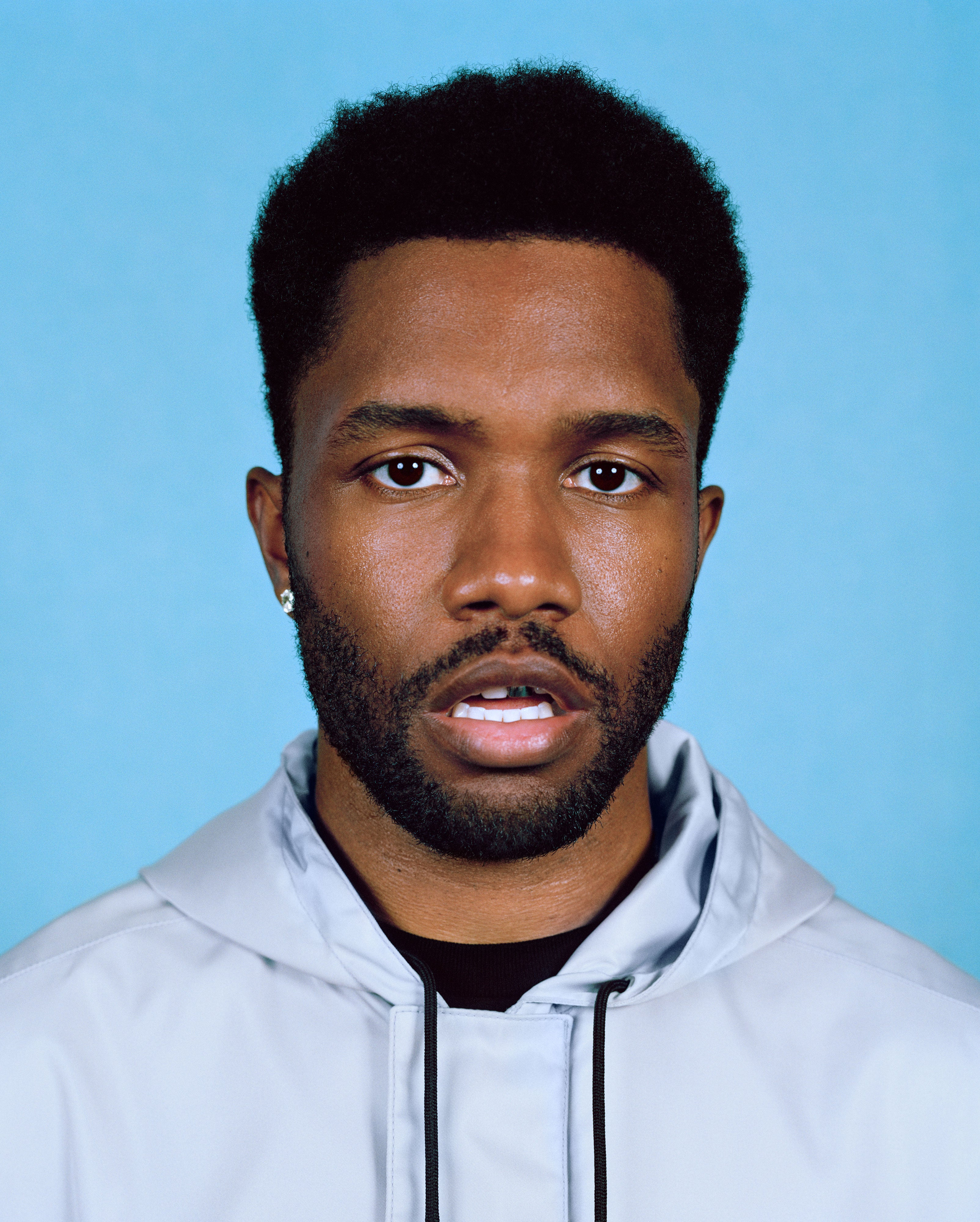
Rapper and singer Frank Ocean

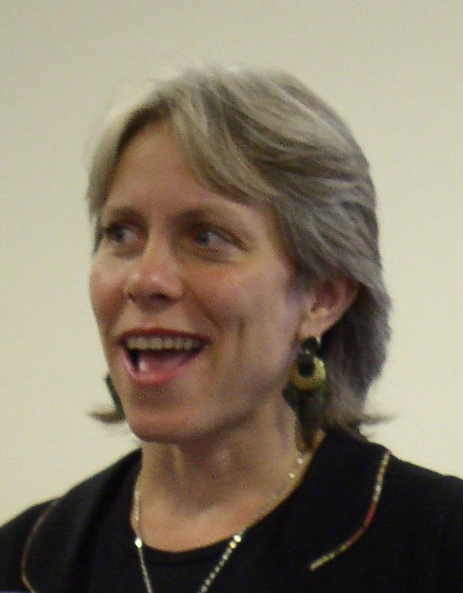
Bisexual rights activist Robyn Ochs

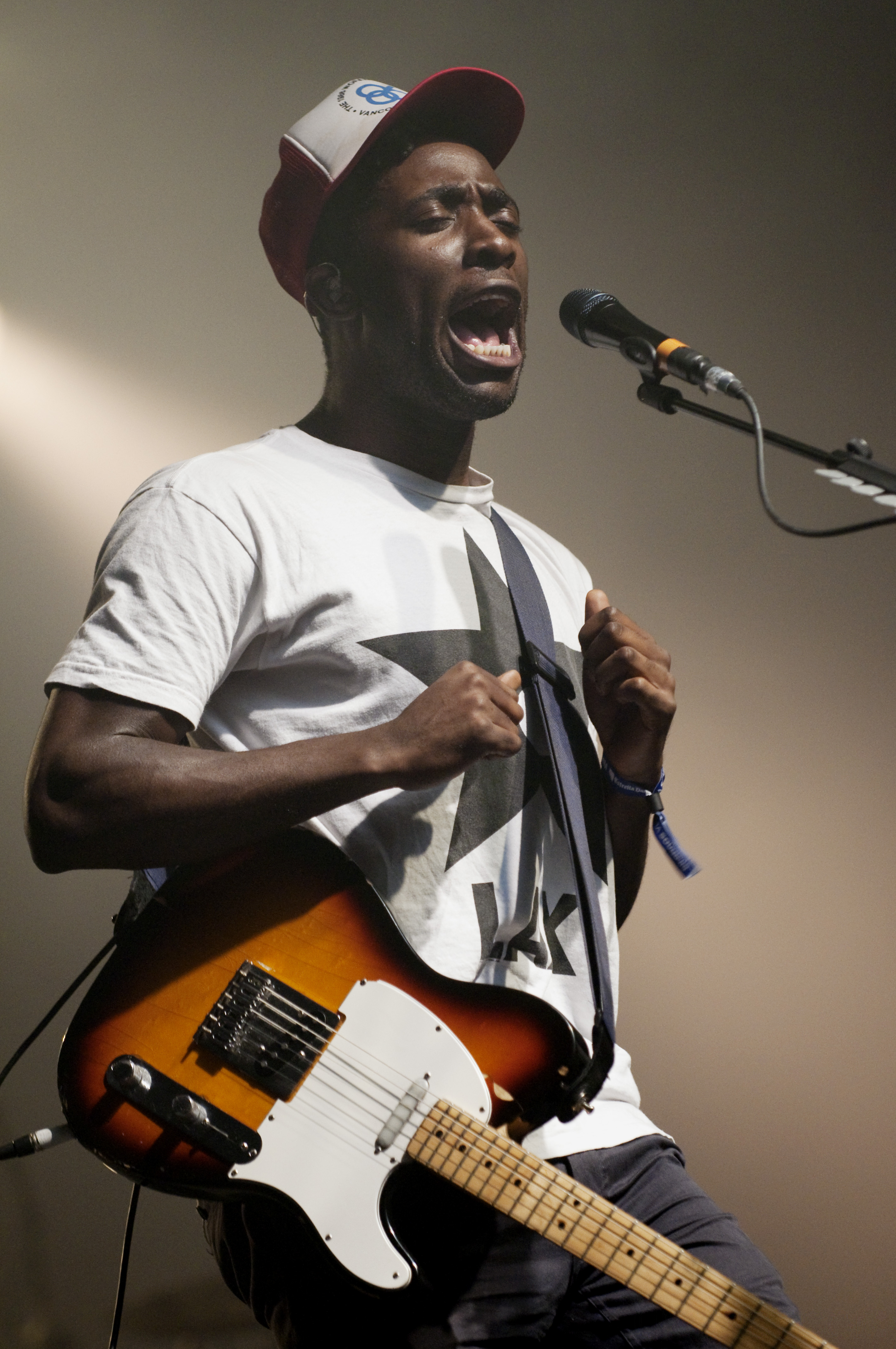
Musician Kele Okereke

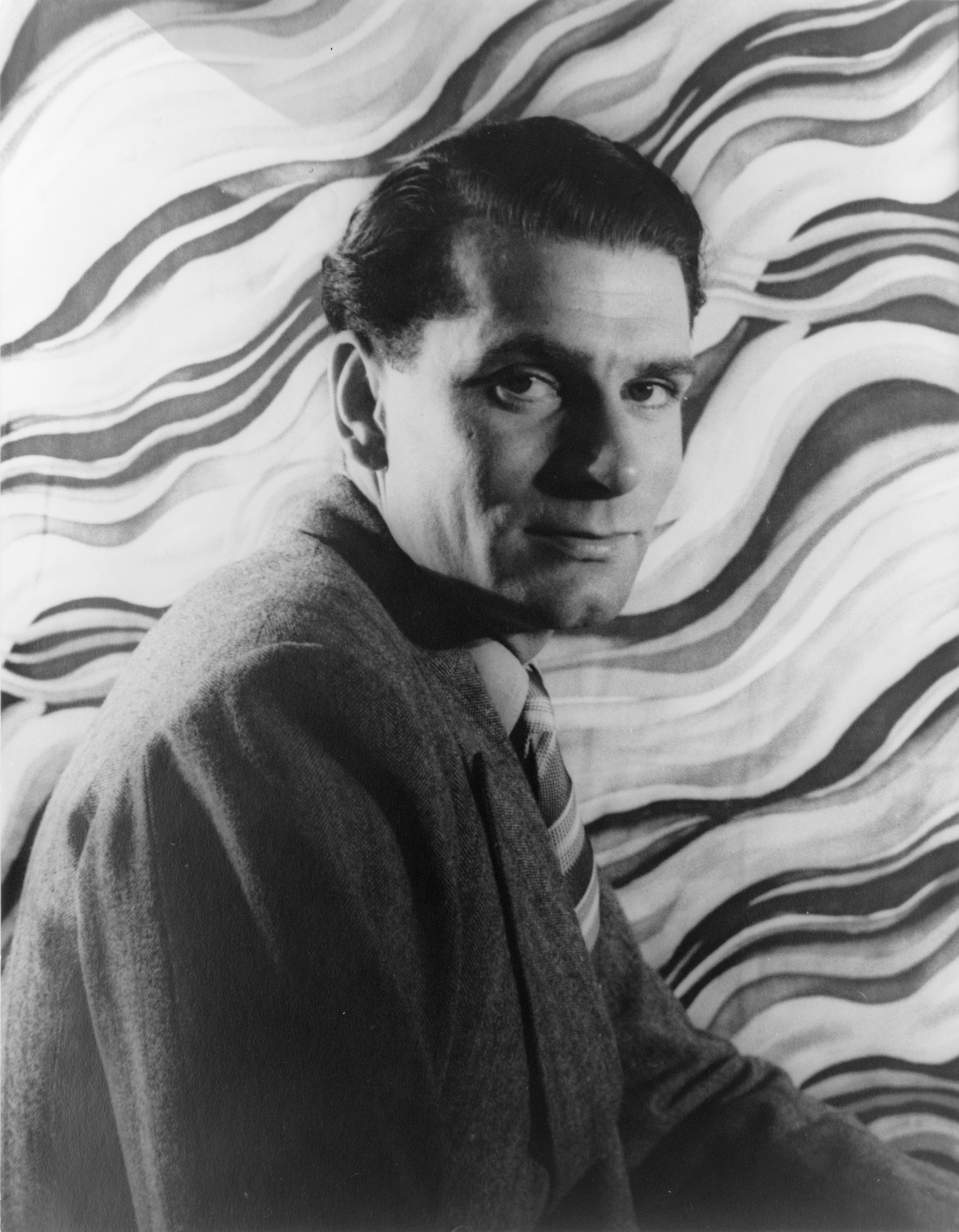
Actor Laurence Olivier

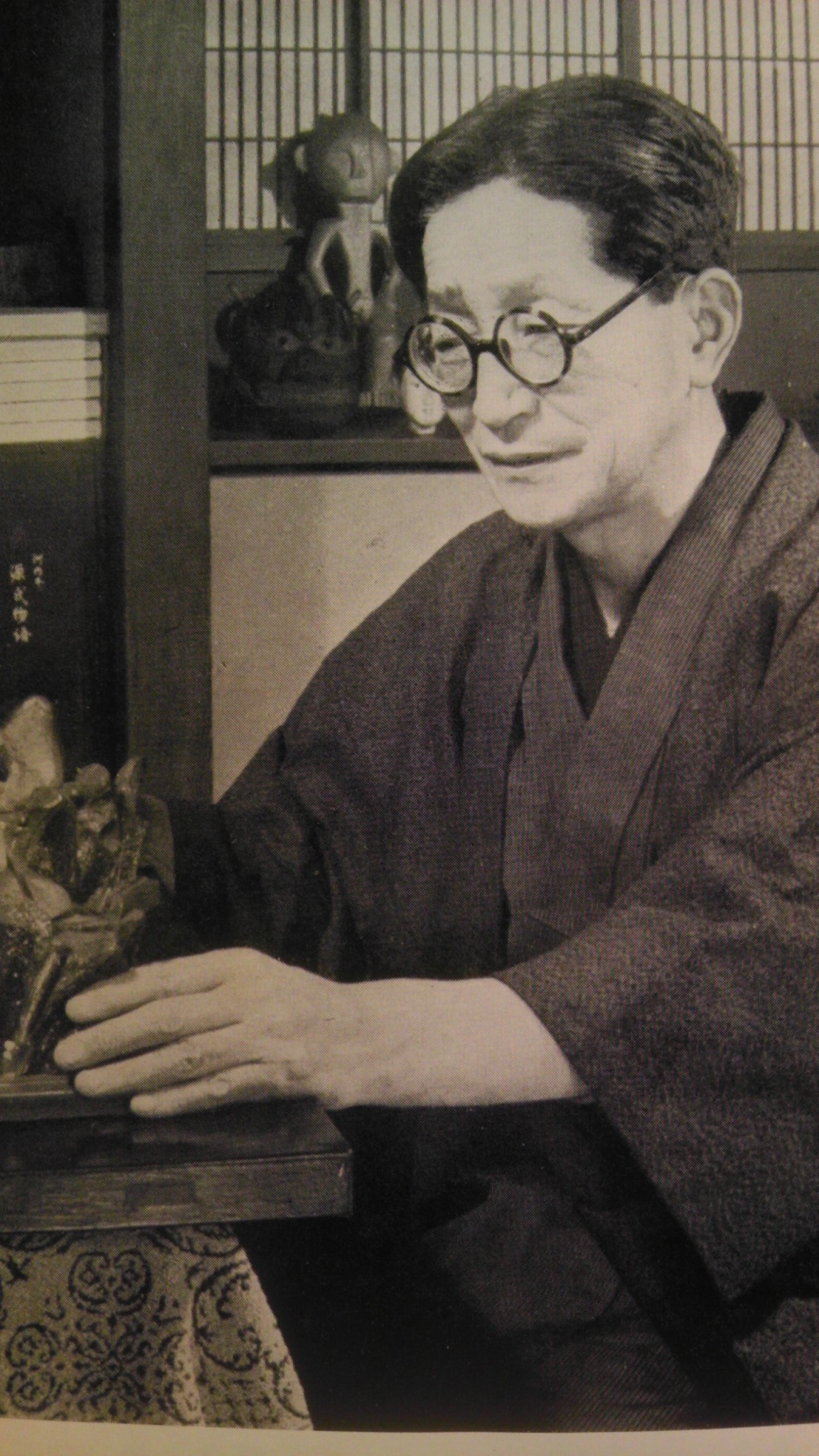
Ethnologist, linguist, folklorist, novelist and poet Shinobu Orikuchi

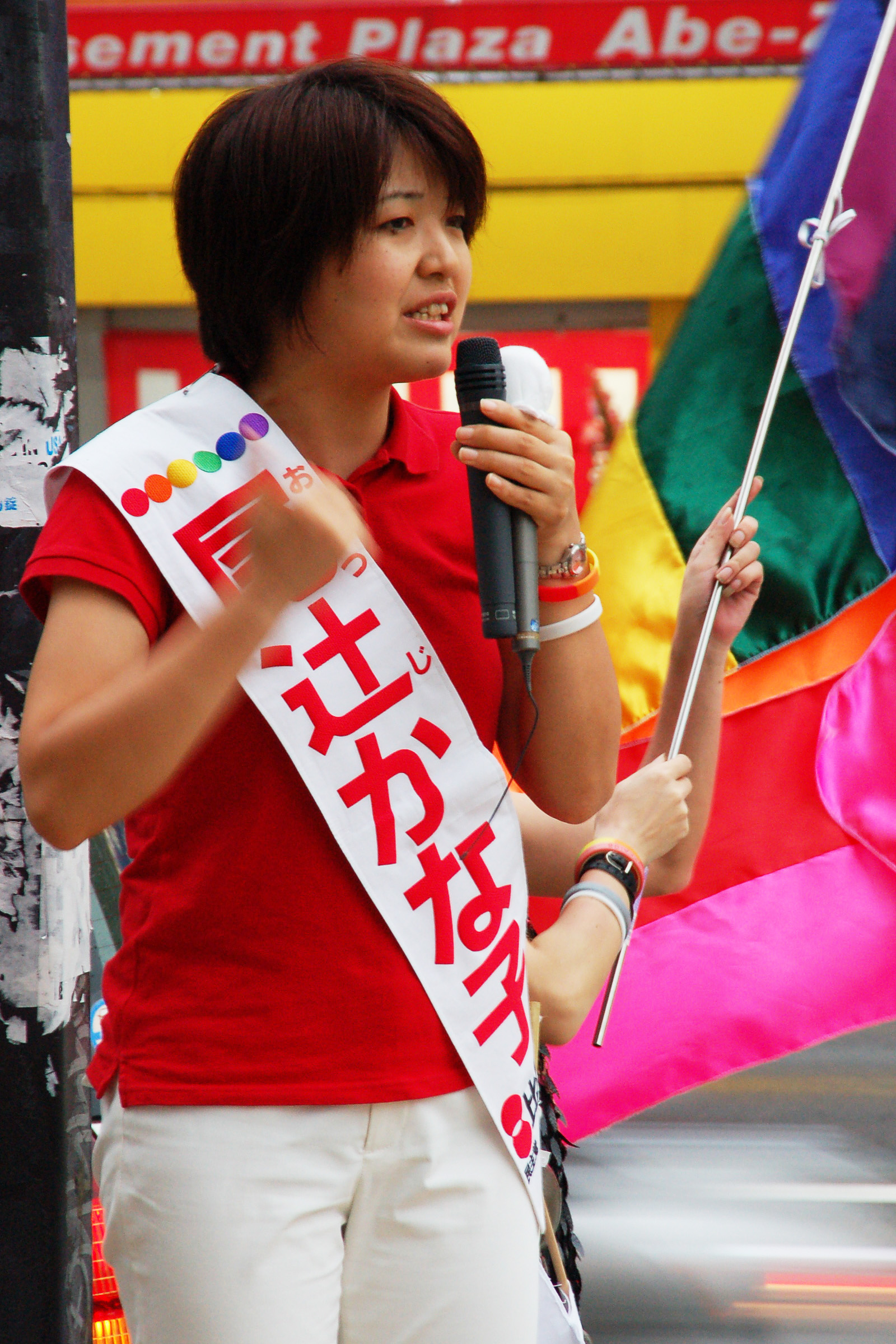
Politician and LGBT rights activist Kanako Otsuji

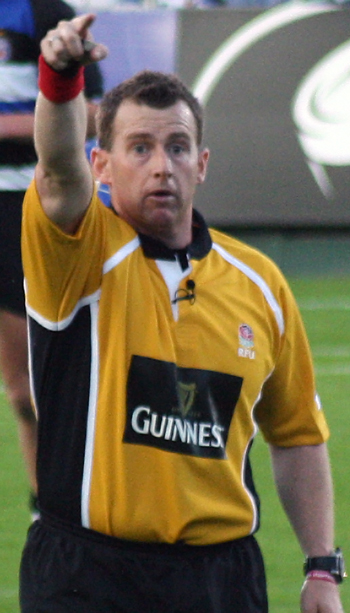
Rugby referee Nigel Owens

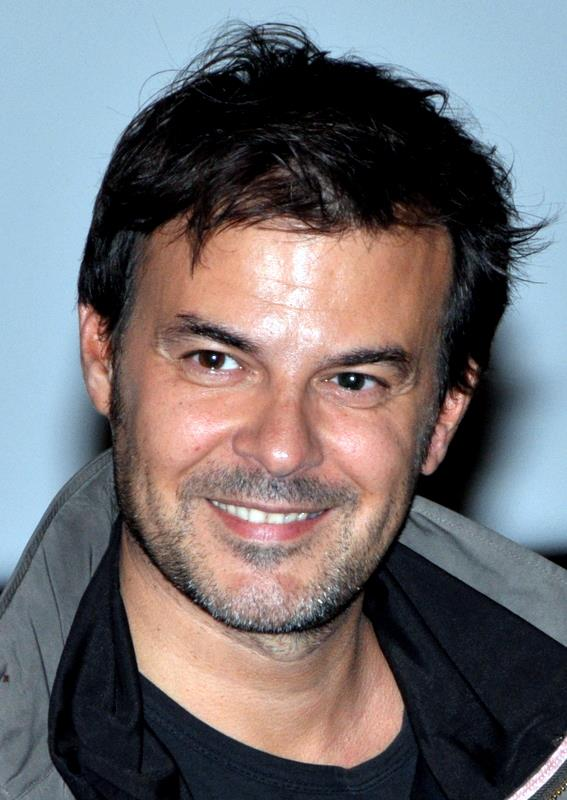
Film director François Ozon

Name	Lifetime	Nationality	Notable as	Notes
Rachid O.	b. 1970	Moroccan	Writer	G
Tyler Oakley	b. 1989	American	YouTube personality	G
Violet Oakley	1874–1961	American	Artist	L
Achy Obejas	b. 1956	Cuban-American	Writer	G
Diane Obomsawin	b. 1959	Canadian	Author, illustrator, animated filmmaker	L
Melibea Obono	b. 1982	Equatoguinean	Novelist, political scientist, academic, LGBTQI rights activist	B
Graeme Obree	b. 1965	Scottish	Cyclist	G
Katy O'Brian	b. 1989	American	Actor	L
Charles J. O'Byrne	b. 1964	American	Politician, ex-priest	G
Tzipora Obziler	b. 1973	Israeli	Tennis player	L
Cian O'Callaghan	b. 1979	Irish	Politician	G
Ryan O'Callaghan	b. 1983	American	Football player	G
Andrea Occhipinti	b. 1957	Italian	Actor, producer	G
Frank Ocean	b. 1987	American	Rapper, singer	B
Robyn Ochs	b. 1958	American	Activist, writer	B
Ryan O'Connell	b. ?	American	Writer, actor, director, comedian	G
Sinéad O'Connor	1966–2023	Irish	Singer	B
Gene October	b. ?	British	Singer (Chelsea)	G
Robert Odeman	1904–1985	German	Pianist, composer	G
Rob Oden	b. 1950	American	Politician; 1st black mayor of Palm Springs, California	G
Daniel O'Donnell	b. 1960	American	Politician	G
Rosie O'Donnell	b. 1962	American	Comedian, talk show host, actor	L
Dede Oetomo	b. 1953	Indonesian	LGBT rights activist	G
Nuala O'Faolain	1940–2008	Irish	Writer, journalist	B
Elizabeth O'Farrell	1883–1957	Irish	Republican, nurse	L
Philip Bourchier O'Ferrall	b. ?	British	Media executive	G
Erin O'Flaherty	b. ?	American	1st openly lesbian contestant to compete in Miss America	L
Jolanta Ogar	b. 1982	Polish	Sport sailor	L
Colm O'Gorman	b. 1966	Irish	Executive Director of Amnesty International in Ireland	G
Roderic O'Gorman	b. 1982	Irish	Politician	G
Paul O'Grady	1955–2023	English	Comedian, TV host	G
Paul O'Grady	1960–2015	Australian	Politician	G
Arike Ogunbowale	b. 1997	American	Basketball player	L
Geoffrey Ogwaro	b. 1973	Ugandan	LGBT rights activist	G
Amir Ohana	b. 1976	Israeli	Politician, lawyer	G
Armen Ohanian	1887–1976	Armenian	Dancer, actor, writer, translator	B
Grace O'Hanlon	b. 1992	New Zealand	Field hockey player	L
Enkyo Pat O'Hara	b. ?	American	Soto priest	L
Frank O'Hara	1926–1966	American	Poet	G
Mal O'Hara	b. ?	Irish	Politician (1st openly gay leader of a major party in Northern Ireland in 2022)	G
Robert O'Hara	b. 1970	American	Playwright, director	G
Denis O'Hare	b. 1962	American	Actor	G
Elisabeth Ohlson	b. 1961	Swedish	Photographer	L
Kjell Erik Øie	b. 1960	Norwegian	Politician, LGBT rights activist	G
Hélio Oiticica	1937–1980	Brazilian	Visual artist	G
Ruth Ojadi	b. 1986	British	Singer-songwriter	B
Tatsuji Okawa	1904–1994	Japanese	Artist	G
Stuart O'Keeffe	b. 1981	Irish	Celebrity chef, food writer, television personality	G
Kele Okereke	b. 1981	British	Rock singer (Bloc Party)	G
Dwight Okita	b. 1958	American	Novelist, poet, playwright	G
Okkar Min Maung	b. 1985	Burmese	Actor, model, singer	G
Joe Okonkwo	b. ?	American	Writer	G
Bolu Okupe	b. 1994	Nigerian	LGBTQ rights activist, model	G
Joy Oladokun	b. 1992	American	Singer-songwriter, folk musician	L
Erwin Olaf	1959–2023	Dutch	Photographer	G
Christina Olague	b. 1961	American	Politician	B
Ibolya Oláh	b. 1978	Hungarian	Pop singer	L
Valborg Olander	1861–1943	Swedish	Educator, politician, suffragette	L
Duke Peter Alexandrovich of Oldenburg	1868–1924	Russian	Noble	G
Maurice Oldfield	1915–1981	English	Intelligence officer	G
Jean O'Leary	1948–2005	American	Lesbian rights activist	L
Karen O'Leary	b. ?	New Zealand	Early childhood educator, comedian, actor	L
Meghan O'Leary	b. 1984	American	Rower	L
Ellen Oléria	b. 1982	Brazilian	Singer	L
Henrik Olesen	b. 1967	Danish	Artist	G
Andrew Olexander	b. 1965	Australian	Politician	G
Ademir Oliveira Rosário	b. 1971	Brazilian	Serial killer	G
André Oliver	1932–1993	French	Fashion designer	G
David Oliver	1962–1991	American	Actor	G
Mary Oliver	1935-2019	American	Poet	L
Montserrat Oliver	b. 1966	Mexican	Model, actor, TV host	L
Pauline Oliveros	1932–2016	American	Accordionist, composer	L
Laurence Olivier	1907–1989	English	Actor	B
Ian Ollis	b. 1970	South African	Politician	G
Dana Olmert	b. 1972	Israeli	Literary theorist, editor, professor	L
Stefan Olsdal	b. 1974	Swedish	Rock musician (Placebo)	G
Angel Olsen	b. 1987	American	Singer-songwriter	L
Mark V. Olsen	b. 1962	American	Screenwriter, TV producer	G
Poppy Starr Olsen	b. ?	Australian	Skateboarder	L
Bree Olson	b. 1986	American	Former porn star	L
Jenni Olson	b. 1962	American	Film curator, filmmaker, author, LGBT film historian	L
Henrik Olsson	b. 1970	Swedish	TV presenter	G
Ty Olsson	b. ?	Canadian	Actor	G
Willem Oltmans	1925–2004	Dutch	Investigative journalist, author	G
Rory O'Malley	b. 1980	American	Actor	G
Ryan O'Meara	b. 1984	American	Ice dancer, figure skating coach	G
Ondine	1937–1989	American	Actor	G
Jamie O'Neill	b. 1962	Irish	Writer	G
Han Ong	b. 1968	Filipino-American	Novelist, playwright	G
Ongina	b. 1982	Filipino-American	Drag performer, HIV activist	G
Onir	b. 1969	Indian	Filmmaker	G
Midi Onodera	b. ?	Japanese-Canadian	Filmmaker	L
Edward Onslow	1758–1829	English	Aristocrat	G
Aras Onur	b. 1982	Turkish	Author, poet	G
Catherine Opie	b. 1961	American	Artist	L
Phyll Opoku-Gyimah	b. 1974	British	Co-founder, trustee and executive (formerly managing) director of UK Black Pride	L
George Oppenheimer	1900–1977	American	Screenwriter	G
George Oprescu	1881–1969	Romanian	Historian, art critic, art collector	G
Rita Ora	b. 1990	Albanian-British	Singer, actor	B
Trinity Ordona	b. ?	American	College teacher, activist, community organizer, minister	L
Seamus O'Regan	b. 1971	Canadian	Broadcast journalist	G
Jessica Origliasso	b. 1984	Australian	Pop singer (The Veronicas), animal rights spokeswoman	B
Shinobu Orikuchi	1887–1953	Japanese	Ethnologist, linguist, folklorist, novelist, poet	G
Romeo Oriogun	b. ?	Nigerian–American	Poet	B
Steve Orlando	b. 1985	American	Comic book writer	B
Curdin Orlik	b. 1993	Swiss	Wrestler	G
Peter Orlovsky	1933–2010	American	Poet, actor	G
Suze Orman	b. 1951	American	Personal finance guru, talk show host, author	L
Alfredo Ormando	1958–1998	Italian	Writer, committed suicide by self-immolation outside of St. Peter's Basilica to protest the Roman Catholic Church's teachings on homosexuality	G
Eric Orner	b. ?	American	Cartoonist	G
Maite Oronoz Rodríguez	b. 1976	Puerto Rican	1st openly gay chief justice in the history of Puerto Rico and the U.S.	L
Caleb Orozco	b. ?	Belizean	LGBT activist	G
Matthieu Orphelin	b. 1972	French	Politician	G
Orry-Kelly	1897–1964	American	Costume designer	G
Brian Orser	b. 1961	Canadian	Figure skater	G
Kenny Ortega	b. 1950	American	Producer, director, choreographer	G
Taylor Ortega	b. 1989	American	Actress	L
Beto Ortiz	b. 1968	Peruvian	Writer	G
Joe Orton	1933–1967	English	Playwright	G
Robert Osborne	1932–2017	American	Film historian, actor	G
T.J. Osborne	b. ?	American	country music singer (Brothers Osborne)	G
Sharon Osbourne	b. 1952	English	TV personality, music manager, businesswoman, promoter	B
Cathal Ó Searcaigh	b. 1956	Irish	Poet	G
Tam O'Shaughnessy	b. 1952	American	Children's science writer, tennis player	L
Blake Oshiro	b. 1970	American	Politician	G
Diriye Osman	b. 1983	Somali-British	Short-story writer, essayist, critic and visual artist	G
Alfonso A. Ossorio	1916–1990	Filipino-American	Abstract expressionist artist	G
Lee Knox Ostertag	b. 1991	American	Cartoonist, writer	L
Ido Ostrowsky	b. 1979	American	Film producer	G
Kanako Otsuji	b. 1974	Japanese	Japan's first openly lesbian politician	L
Ulrike Ottinger	b. 1942	German	Filmmaker, photographer	L
Yotam Ottolenghi	b. 1968	Israeli-British	Chef, restaurant owner, food writer	G
Pádraig Ó Tuama	b. ?	Irish	Poet, theologian	G
Cindy Ouellet	b. 1988	Canadian	Wheelchair basketball player	L
Jodie Ounsley	b. 2001	English	International union rugby player	L
Sarah Outen	b. 1985	English	Athlete, adventurer, motivational speaker	L
Alan Oversby	1933–1996	English	Body modification pioneer	G
Rayvon Owen	b. 1991	American	Singer	G
Sean Ethan Owen	1981–2004	American	Murder victim	G
Wilfred Owen	1893–1918	English	Poet and soldier	G
Nigel Owens	b. 1971	Welsh	International rugby union referee, TV personality	G
Rick Owens	b. 1962	American	Fashion designer	G
Jeanette Mott Oxford	b. 1954	American	Missouri's first openly lesbian state legislator	L
Jon Reidar Øyan	b. 1981	Norwegian	Politician, LGBT rights activist	G
Jayne Ozanne	b. ?	Guernsey-British	Anglican LGBT activist	L
François Ozon	b. 1967	French	Film director, screenwriter	G
Ferzan Özpetek	b. 1959	Turkish-Italian	Filmmaker	G

== See also ==
- List of gay, lesbian or bisexual people
