= Beautiful Thing (film) =

1996 film by Hettie MacDonald

- Theatrical release poster
- Directed by: Hettie MacDonald
- Screenplay by: Jonathan Harvey
- Based on: Beautiful Thing by Jonathan Harvey
- Produced by: Tony Garnett; Bill Shapter
- Starring: Linda Henry; Glen Berry; Scott Neal; Tameka Empson; Ben Daniels
- Cinematography: Chris Seager
- Edited by: Don Fairservice
- Music by: John Altman
- Production company: Channel Four Films
- Distributed by: FilmFour Distributors
- Release date: 14 June 1996
- Running time: 89 minutes
- Country: United Kingdom
- Language: English
- Box office: $3 million

Beautiful Thing is a 1996 British coming-of-age romantic comedy-drama film directed by Hettie MacDonald from a screenplay by Jonathan Harvey, based on Harvey's 1993 play. The film stars Linda Henry, Glen Berry, Scott Neal, Tameka Empson and Ben Daniels. The film marked the cinema debuts of Harvey, MacDonald, and actors Berry, Neal and Empson.

The film was originally intended for television broadcast only, but it was so well-received that it was subsequently released in UK cinemas on 14 June 1996 by Channel 4 Films. The atmosphere of the film is heavily influenced by a soundtrack consisting almost entirely of the music of the Mamas & the Papas and Cass Elliot.

Beautiful Thing received generally positive reviews, and is often ranked as one of the best LGBTQ films. In 2016, British playwright Fin Kennedy said that twenty years later, the story told is still held in "near-universal affection among audiences".

== Plot ==
Jamie Gangel is a teenager who is bullied by his classmates due to his introverted nature and dislike of football. He lives on a council estate in Thamesmead, a working-class area of south-east London, with his single mother, Sandra, who is preoccupied with ambitious plans to run her own pub and has an ever-changing string of lovers; the latest of these is Tony, a neo-hippie. Sandra often clashes with Leah, a sassy and rude neighbour who has been expelled from school, takes a variety of drugs, and constantly listens and sings along to her mother's Cass Elliot records.

Jamie is secretly infatuated with his classmate and next-door neighbour Ste Pearce, who is frequently beaten up by his drug-dealing older brother and alcoholic father. One night, after Ste is beaten by his brother, Sandra takes pity and lets him sleep over at her flat. In the absence of a third bed, Ste has to make do with sleeping "head-to-toe" with Jamie. On their second night sharing a bed, Jamie rubs peppermint lotion on Ste's bruised back. After Ste reveals that he has never been kissed, Jamie kisses him for the first time.

The next morning, Ste leaves the flat before Jamie awakens, and avoids him for the next few days. One day, Jamie works up the nerve to steal an issue of Gay Times from a newsagent. Jamie finally spots Ste at a nearby house party and confronts him about his feelings; they prepare to leave together. The party ends badly, with Sandra attacking Leah for gossiping about her miscarriage. After Sandra leaves, Leah threatens to expose Jamie and Ste's relationship and confesses to having covered up for Ste in front of his father and brother. Ste reacts by angrily rejecting Jamie and running away.

Slowly, Ste accepts Jamie's love. Their relationship develops as they visit a gay pub together, after which they kiss in a park. After a telephone conversation with Jamie's teacher, Sandra finds his Gay Times magazine under his bed and his schoolbooks vandalised with homophobic insults. She follows the boys to the gay pub and discovers their secret. That night, Sandra confronts Jamie about his sexuality, but comes to accept his relationship with Ste. Later, Tony saves Leah from falling off a balcony while she is having a bad trip. Sandra then informs Jamie that she has been offered her own pub in Rotherhithe with a new flat above it.

The next day, Sandra breaks up with Tony. After Ste invites Leah to accompany him and Jamie to the gay pub that night, the two boys share a slow dance in the courtyard of their council estate to the Cass Elliot song "Dream a Little Dream of Me". A protective Sandra dances defiantly at the boys' side with Leah as the local residents look on. Some onlookers are shocked, some strongly disapprove and some enjoy the moment.

== Cast ==
- Linda Henry as Sandra Gangel
- Glen Berry as Jamie Gangel
- Scott Neal as Ste Pearce
- Ben Daniels as Tony
- Tameka Empson as Leah Russell
- Meera Syal as Miss Chauhan
- Martin Walsh as Mr Bennett
- Steven Martin as Ryan McBride
- Andrew Fraser as Jayson
- John Savage as Lenny
- Julie Smith as Gina
- Jeillo Edwards as Rose Russell
- Anna Karen as Marlene
- Garry Cooper as Ronnie Pearce
- Daniel Bowers as Trevor Pearce
- Terry Duggan as Kevin
- Sophie Stanton as Louise
- Ozdemir Mamodeally as Slasher
- John Benfield as Rodney Barr
- Davyd Harries as brewery official
- Beth Goddard as brewery official
- Marlene Sidaway as Betty
- Liane Ware as Claire
- Catherine Sanderson as Kelly
- Dave Lynn as drag performer
- Jonathan Harvey as wheelchair queen (uncredited)

== Background and production ==
Jonathan Harvey, who wrote the script, said a substantial portion of the story was based on his own memories of growing up gay, and his goal with the film was "to have a hopeful, happy-ending story about being gay, being working class, and coming out." His writing was also motivated by the knowledge that at the time, a heterosexual teenager could watch the "gorgeous guy taking the gorgeous girl to the prom" on television, but there was really no role models for gay teenagers in film or on television. Harvey said he had to face an issue of the boys ages in the film, because initially the two boys were supposed to be 15 and 16, but those ages were below the age of consent in Britain, so they auditioned 17-year-olds for the roles. He said the lawyers had to scrutinise the project, due to the scene where Jamie and Ste were having a "snog on screen." Harvey said they eventually decided to take out any references to specific ages, but not for any legal reasons, instead, it was because Gay Times objected to using their magazine in the film if there was going to be any mention of the boys being under age.

Producer Tony Garnett thought the play was better suited for the screen, so after Channel 4 greenlit the film production, David Aukin, Channel 4's head of drama, hired the play's stage director, Hettie MacDonald, to helm the film, because the subject matter was "foreign" to Garnett. He also recalled the letters that poured in after the film was released from young men, "who thanked us for saving them: they now knew they were not alone, they were not freaks." First assistant director Susie Liggat recalls that electricians refused to work on the scenes that were shot after Jamie and Ste leave The Gloucester, and are seen kissing in the woods, so there was a compromise that the electricians would set up the lights, and then they left before the scenes were shot. Liggat and Harvey both had uncredited roles in the film, with Liggat portraying a woman at the newsstand when Jamie steals the copy of Gay Times, and Harvey was "Wheelchair Queen" in the Gloucester scene. Dave Lynn, who portrayed the drag performer at the Gloucester that flirts with Jamie and Ste, said he was already an existing act at the Gloucester, and was asked on site if he wanted to appear in the film. He donated the dress he was wearing in the film to be placed on display at a bar in Brighton, along with a copy of the script.

The film was Hettie MacDonald's directorial debut, and she recalls her first day on the set, as being "really scary". MacDonald said she had never even seen a film set, much less been in charge of one before and "suddenly there were 100 faces peering at me waiting for me to yell: Action!" She went on to say that although she was "totally unprepared for what I had to do", the film crew she was working with were so experienced, like a well-oiled machine, you really couldn't do anything "drastically wrong", and they just "get on with it." Besides being MacDonald's debut at directing, it was also Harvey's film debut for writing a screenplay, along with actors Berry, Neal and Empson making their first appearance on the big screen.

=== Filming ===
Harvey said he decided the filming location would be in Thamesmead, a working-class area in south-east London, that is dominated by post-war council estates, because he had taught school there for three years. Principal photography took five weeks to complete. In the opening, the film shows a gang of teenage boys playing football in a grassy area in Thamesmead; the blocks of flats seen in the background are located on the Yarnton Way in Thamesmead. The estates that are frequently seen in Thamesmead, are notable for also being featured in Stanley Kubrick's A Clockwork Orange, and Anthony Simmons' The Optimists of Nine Elms.

Production designer Mark Stevenson said he found three adjacent Thamesmead spaces for shooting locations, with one that was being renovated, another one was a burned-out shell, and the final space had previously been a radio station. He recalls that he spent most of his budget restoring them to look like the flats that Jamie, Ste and Leah lived in. The pub where Sandra was employed, was the former Lakeside Bar on Southmere Lake.

A key scene was shot on location in Greenwich; when Jamie and Ste begin to accept who they are, they go to a gay pub called The Gloucester in Greenwich, which the pair of teens saw advertised in an issue of Gay Times. In 2023, a rainbow plaque was installed at the location, denoting it as a significant place in LGBTQ history, due to the film. Another filming location in Greenwich is the tavern that Sandra is aspiring to run called The Anchor, which is actually the Cutty Sark.

Filming locations in Greenwich and rainbow plaque
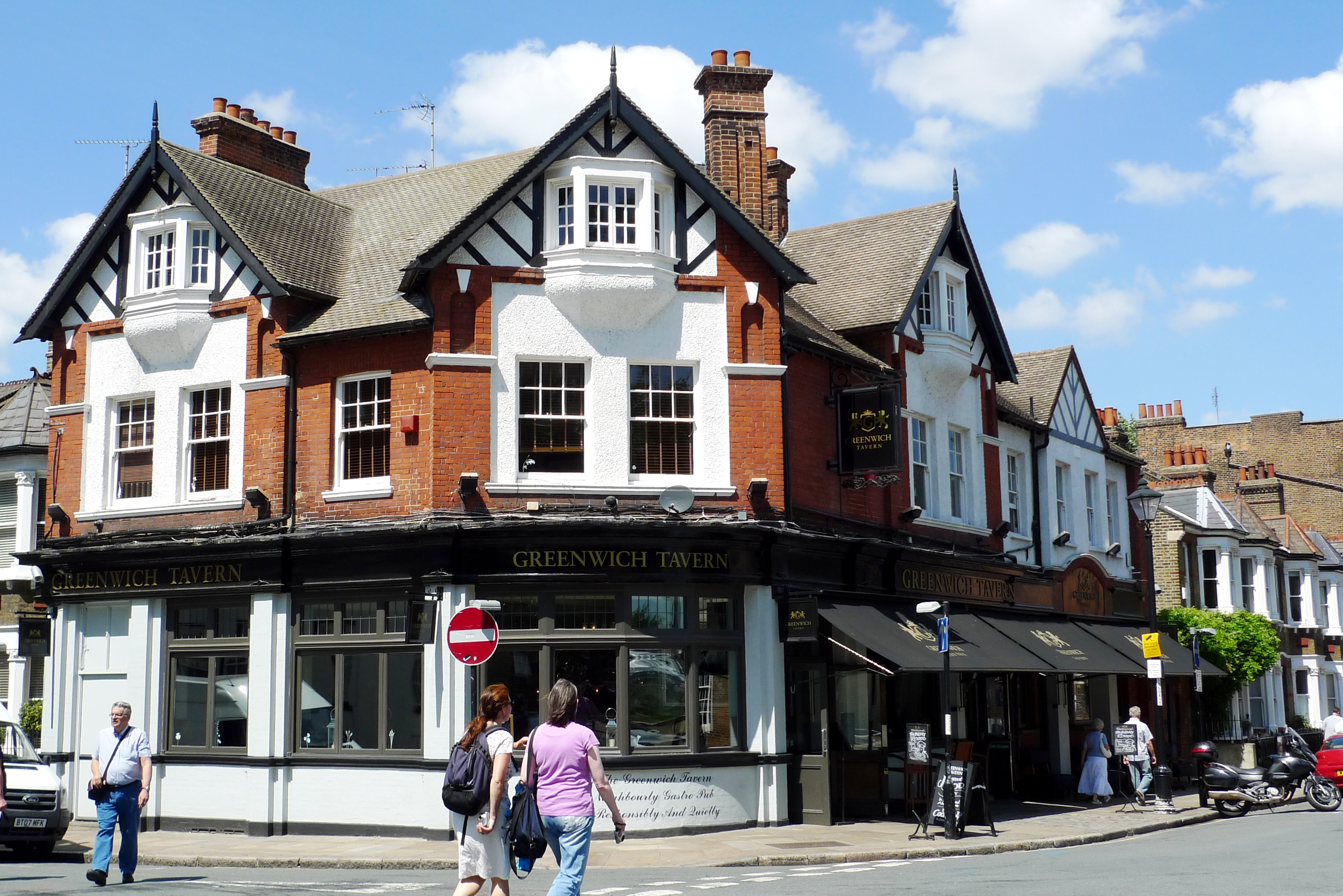
The Gloucester, the pub Jamie and Ste visit. As of 2024, The Gloucester is now the Greenwich Tavern.

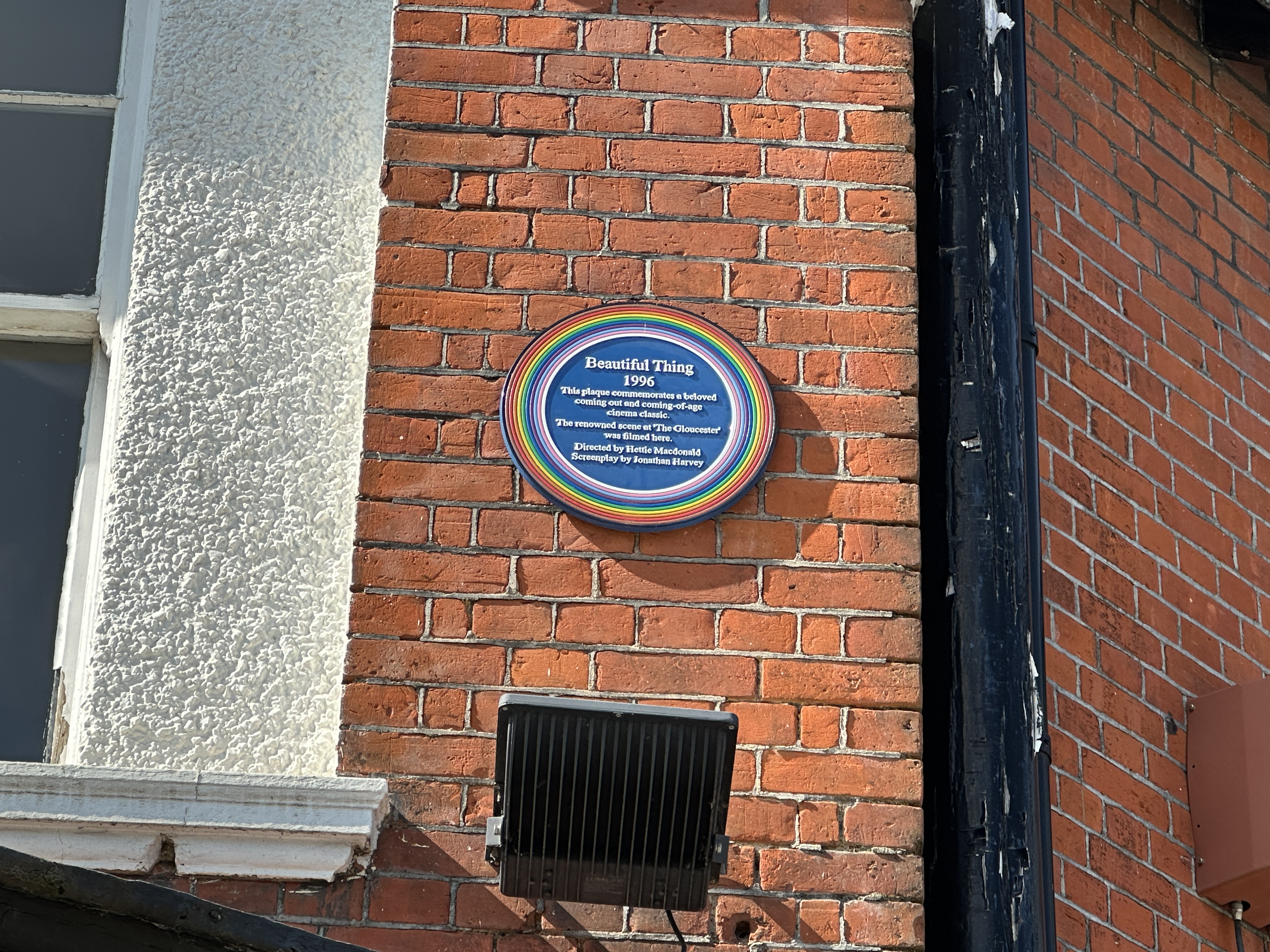
Beautiful Thing rainbow plaque on the Greenwich Tavern, seen in March 2025

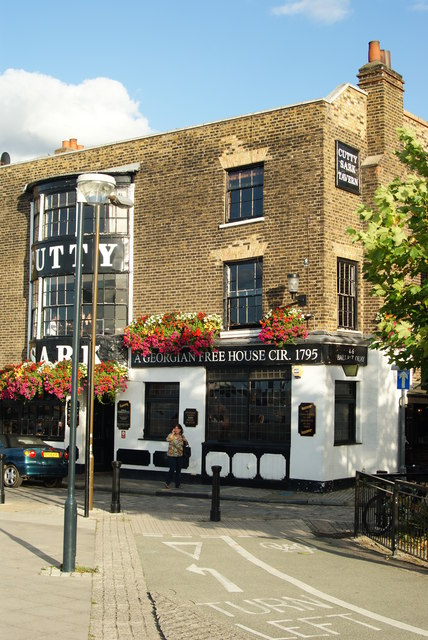
The Cutty Sark Tavern (The Anchor), the tavern where Sandra had aspirations to run

== Themes ==
Beautiful Thing telegraphed to its mid-1990s audiences something they hadn’t heard before:

Gay people are just people.

The narrative of the film includes themes of gender, human sexuality, race, homophobia and child abuse. There is also the themes of societal pressure and prejudice, that Jamie and Ste face surrounding their same–sex relationship, and the stigma that gay teenagers have to confront when they are coming out. Additionally, there are elements of the adult characters in the film feeling like they are trapped on the fringes of a two-tiered Britain, because of their position in a working-class life.

== Soundtrack ==
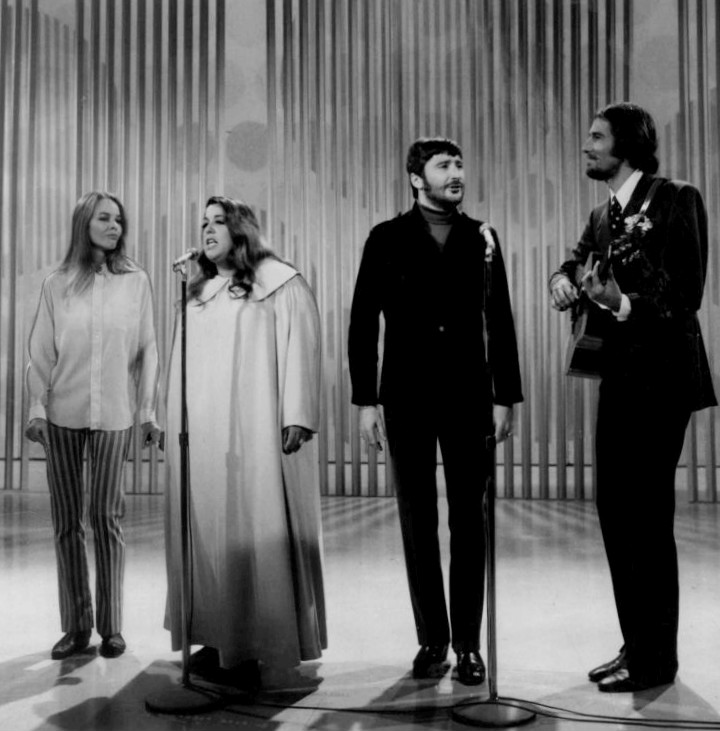
The Mamas & the Papas (Cass Elliot second from left) in 1967

The soundtrack to the film was released by MCA Records on 15 October 1996. It consists primarily of the music from the Mamas & the Papas and Cass Elliot. Producer Tony Garnett recalls that Channel 4 was insistent they obtain the rights for the music, which he said was cost prohibitive. Garnett went on to say that "the film depended on this" (obtaining the rights). He said the negotiations for the rights extended beyond the deadline for cancelling the film, but "at the last minute we made a deal."

Brandon Tensley from The Atlantic, opined that the music "conjures up a sort of escapist synergy with counterculture, and optimism, from other eras," while film critic Stephen Holden says the soundtrack "plays a crucial role in setting the tone of a likable little film whose mixture of working-class realism and feel-good fantasy resurrects the spirit of 1960s movies set in swinging England."

Beautiful Thing (Music from the Motion Picture) track listing
No.	Title	Writer(s)	Artist	Length
1.	"It's Getting Better"	Barry Mann; Cynthia Weil	Mama Cass	3:00
2.	"One Way Ticket"	Stephen Lawrence; Bruce Hart	Mama Cass	2:46
3.	"California Earthquake"	John Hartford	Mama Cass	3:24
4.	"Welcome to the World"	Martin Siegal; Scott English	Mama Cass	2:18
5.	"Make Your Own Kind of Music"	Barry Mann; Cynthia Weil	Mama Cass	2:23
6.	"Creeque Alley"	John Phillips; Michelle Phillips	The Mamas & the Papas	3:16
7.	"Dream a Little Dream of Me"	Gus Kahn; Wilbur Schwandt; Fabian Andre	The Mamas & the Papas	3:12
8.	"Move in a Little Closer, Baby"	Robert O'Connor; Arnold Capitanelli	Mama Cass	2:38
9.	"California Dreamin'"	J. Phillips; M. Phillips	The Mamas & the Papas	2:40
10.	"Monday, Monday"	J. Phillips	The Mamas & the Papas	3:24
11.	"I Saw Her Again Last Night"	J. Phillips; Denny Doherty	The Mamas & the Papas	3:14
12.	"Words of Love"	J. Phillips	The Mamas & the Papas	2:15
13.	"Dedicated to the One I Love"	Lowman Pauling; Ralph Bass	The Mamas & the Papas	2:50
14.	"Look Through My Window"	J. Phillips	The Mamas & the Papas	3:34
15.	"Go Where You Wanna Go"	J. Phillips	The Mamas & the Papas	2:27
16.	"Beautiful Thing Medley" ("Peppermint Foot Lotion" / "Beautiful Thing" / "The Gloucester" / 'Don't Cry")	John Altman		8:00

== Release ==
Beautiful Thing premiered at the London Lesbian and Gay Film Festival in March 1996, after initially being rejected by the Berlin Film Festival. After a successful run at the London Festival, where it was awarded Best Film, it was then screened at the It's Queer Up North Festival in Manchester in April 1996. In May 1996, it was shown at the Warwick Arts Centre, and later that month it was also screened at the Cannes Film Festival, where it was one of only two British films to be shown in the festival's Director's Fortnight. It had a general release in UK cinemas on 14 June 1996, and by 16 June 1996, it was ranked at number 5 in the "top films around the country" list compiled by The Observer; a position it held steadfast for a month. In the United States, the film had its general release in October 1996. The film grossed $3,072,738 at the box office. In material sent out advertising the film, it was promoted as "an urban fairytale."

=== Home media ===
Beautiful Thing was released on VHS in 1997. The film had its television premiere on the Sundance Channel in June 1998, and was released to DVD in May 2003. In March 2024, the British Film Institute released a special Blu-ray version of the film, which includes: commentary with Jonathan Harvey, Hettie Macdonald and Susie Liggat, a short film called Living at Thamesmead and a short titled Crashing Waves. There is also footage of the film's rainbow plaque unveiling at the Greenwich Tavern, and a booklet is included with the set.

== Reception ==
=== Critical response ===
Beautiful Thing has been mostly commended by contemporary critics. On the review aggregator website Rotten Tomatoes, the film holds an approval rating of 92% based on 25 reviews, with an average rating of 6.9/10. The website's critics consensus reads: "An engaging slice of life drama that happens to double as a gay coming-of-age story, Beautiful Thing captures its place and time with deceptive depth and skill."

British film critic Derek Malcolm said "the film is held together by the performances of Berry and Neal." He further observed that the film "sometimes lacks a bite of more depressing realities; its comedy is neither unthinking nor uncaring, but it just ends up a little glib." Overall, he opines the film "is intent on giving its audience a good time while quietly persuading them that it takes all sorts to make a world." Geoff Brown wrote in The Times that the "settings and characters put the film squarely in the British realist camp: this is a tale of working-class life." He also complimented the two main characters, Jamie and Ste, for "discovering their tender feelings for each other without wails of anguish."

American film critic Roger Ebert wrote "the most interesting scenes involve the characters around them, who all but steal the film. The boys' lives contain few surprises, but from the other characters there is one astonishment after another." Liese Spencer from Sight and Sound wrote actors Glen Berry and Scott Neal are "convincingly gauche, combining cheeky laddishness and youthful vulnerability, and Linda Henry exudes a muscular independence as this tough survivor whose conversation has a waspish edge." Overall, she stated "the film is rich in an understated realism, and MacDonald and Harvey have, in fact, produced an 'issue' film with a remarkably light touch."

Doug Brantley wrote in Out Magazine that "this tender tale of two young blokes coming of age in working-class London hits all the right chords (teen angst, suicide, first love, coming out) with star-turn performances and a killer Mama Cass soundtrack." Barbara Creed of The Age opined that "first-time director Hettie MacDonald imbues the story with humor and joy, and it is a charming, endearing film that never degenerates into sentimentality or melodrama." She stated the film "makes the most of an intelligent, witty script and an excellent cast, with the best performance coming from Linda Henry, whose wicked sense of humor softens her tough, abrasive manner."

American film critic Stephen Holden praised the acting, observing that "Berry and Neal capture every blush and awkward gesture of two shy adolescents stumbling together in terror out onto some very thin ice, and Ms. Henry is wonderful as a woman whose fighting spirit masks a streak of hard-bitten tenderness." Holden credits the funniest line in the film to Sandra, when she "assures her son, where gay people can go and live without fear of harassment: 'It's an island in the Mediterranean called Lesbian'."

=== Accolades ===
Year	Award	Category	Result	Ref.
1996	London Lesbian and Gay Film Festival	Best Film	Won	
1996	Cannes Film Festival	Directors' Fortnight	Selected	
1996	São Paulo International Film Festival	International Jury Award	Honorable Mention	
1996	European Film Awards	Best Young Film	Nominated	
1996	Fort Lauderdale International Film Festival	Best Screenplay	Won	
1996	Toronto Film Festival	People's Choice Award	2nd place	
1997	GLAAD Media Award	Outstanding Film – Limited Release	Won	
1997	Chlotrudis Awards	Best Movie	Nominated	
1997	Chlotrudis Awards	Best Actress – Linda Henry	Nominated	

== Legacy ==
It was a snapshot of life about a group of characters who all lived next door to each other, and I don't really believe that 20 years on, those four or five people would necessarily be in the same universe together. I suppose what's interesting is that there's not been a British gay film like it since.

— Jonathan Harvey

Philip Kemp of Sight and Sound argues the film is permeated with socio-political significance, in that it was instrumental in making more people accepting of homosexuality, in a post Margaret Thatcher Britain. Kemp further states that the mid-1990s was a crucial time for LGBTQ films, and due to its subject matter, the film successfully showcased multiple cultural viewpoints. He also notes that the film arose out of the new queer cinema movement, which aimed to get rid of the negative connotations surrounding the term "queer", and instead, show there could be "positive meanings in politics and filmmaking."

Twenty years after the film's release, William Connolly, the editor of Gay Times, published a retrospective, stating that the film was "resonant with the movement towards realism in British cinema", for the way it portrayed the LGBTQ identity. Connolly observed that the story told in the film showed a different side to gay relationships, in that they were no longer viewed as "two guys hooking up on a Friday night and spending their weekend fucking, snorting cocaine and slurring their speech." Connolly contends that the film was not only a "driving force" for LGBTQ visibility in the mainstream media, it also played a significant role in advancing the cause of equality in filmmaking. Additionally, Connolly argues that the film helped to emphasise that "homosexuality ran through all facets of society." He also highlighted a scene in the film where Jamie steals a copy of Gay Times from a newsstand, and shops at the time reported that multiple teenagers were also stealing copies of the magazine as a "rite of passage."

Throughout the years, Beautiful Thing has consistently been ranked by various publications as one of the best LGBTQ films of all time. (Note: Attributed to multiple sources:) The film has also been frequently highlighted as being a notable teen coming-of-age story. (Note: Attributed to multiple sources:) It has sometimes been referred to a cult classic as well. (Note: Attributed to multiple sources:) British playwright Fin Kennedy, noted that even though twenty years has passed since the release of the film, the coming-of-age story told in the film is still held in "near-universal affection among audiences".

== See also ==
- List of LGBTQ-related films
- List of coming-of-age stories
- LGBTQ rights in the United Kingdom
- Timeline of LGBTQ history in the British Isles
