= Greenwich Tavern =

Coordinates: 51°28′47″N 0°00′26″W

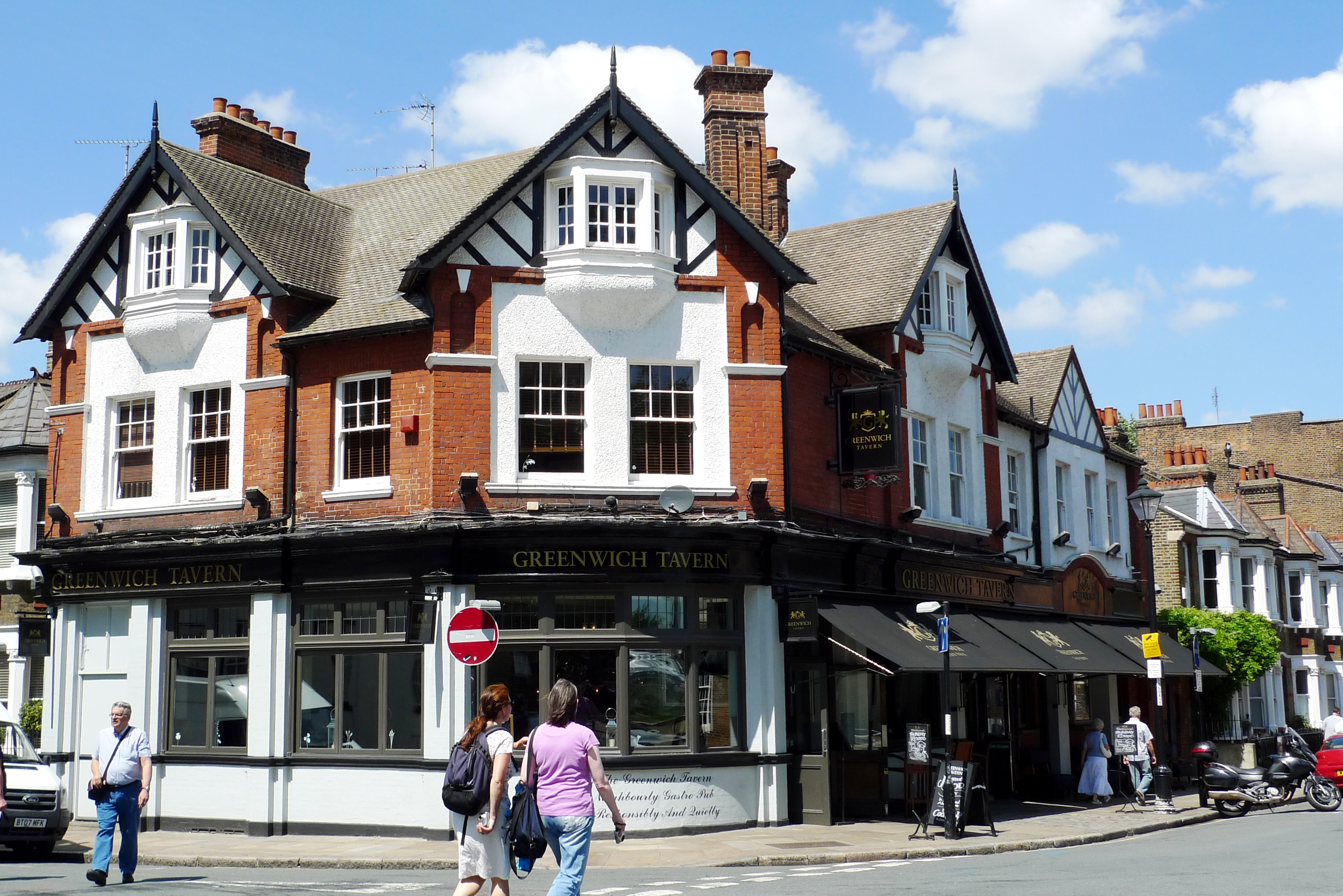
- Interactive map of the Greenwich Tavern area

General information
- Location: 1 King William Walk, London SE10 9JH, England

Website
- www.greenwichtavern.co.uk

The Greenwich Tavern (formerly the Gloucester Hotel and Gloucester Arms, among other names) is a pub located at 1 King William Walk in Greenwich, London, opposite the northern entrance to Greenwich Park. In 2023 it became the third London location with a rainbow plaque denoting a significant place in LGBTQI+ history, being the location of a key scene in the 1996 film Beautiful Thing.

== History ==
In 1902, the Gloucester Hotel was recorded as being on the site of a former prison used (c 1555) during the reign of Mary I to confine Protestant prisoners. (Later sources record a debtors' prison in Greenwich in 1812, close to a Court of Requests - this term may denote a law court associated with the nearby Greenwich royal Palace of Placentia, or a latter-day 'small claims court' instituted in the 18th and early 19th centuries).

The current building dates back to around the mid 19th century; The Examiner weekly newspaper recorded a fire at The Gloucester Hotel on the corner of Nevada Street (formerly Silver Street) and what was then named King William Street (formerly King Street) in December 1851. The rebuilt Gloucester Hotel was subsequently renamed The Gloucester, The Gloucester Arms, The Greenwich Park Bar & Grill and The Greenwich Tavern.

In June 2023, the Greenwich Tavern was announced as the third London location to be marked by a rainbow plaque - used to denote significant people, places and moments in LGBTQI+ history. As the Gloucester Arms, then a well-known gay bar, it was the location of a key scene in the 1996 film Beautiful Thing which was set and filmed in Thamesmead and Greenwich. The plaque was unveiled at the Greenwich Tavern on 23 July 2023.
