= Rainbow plaque =

UK gay commemorative plaque programme

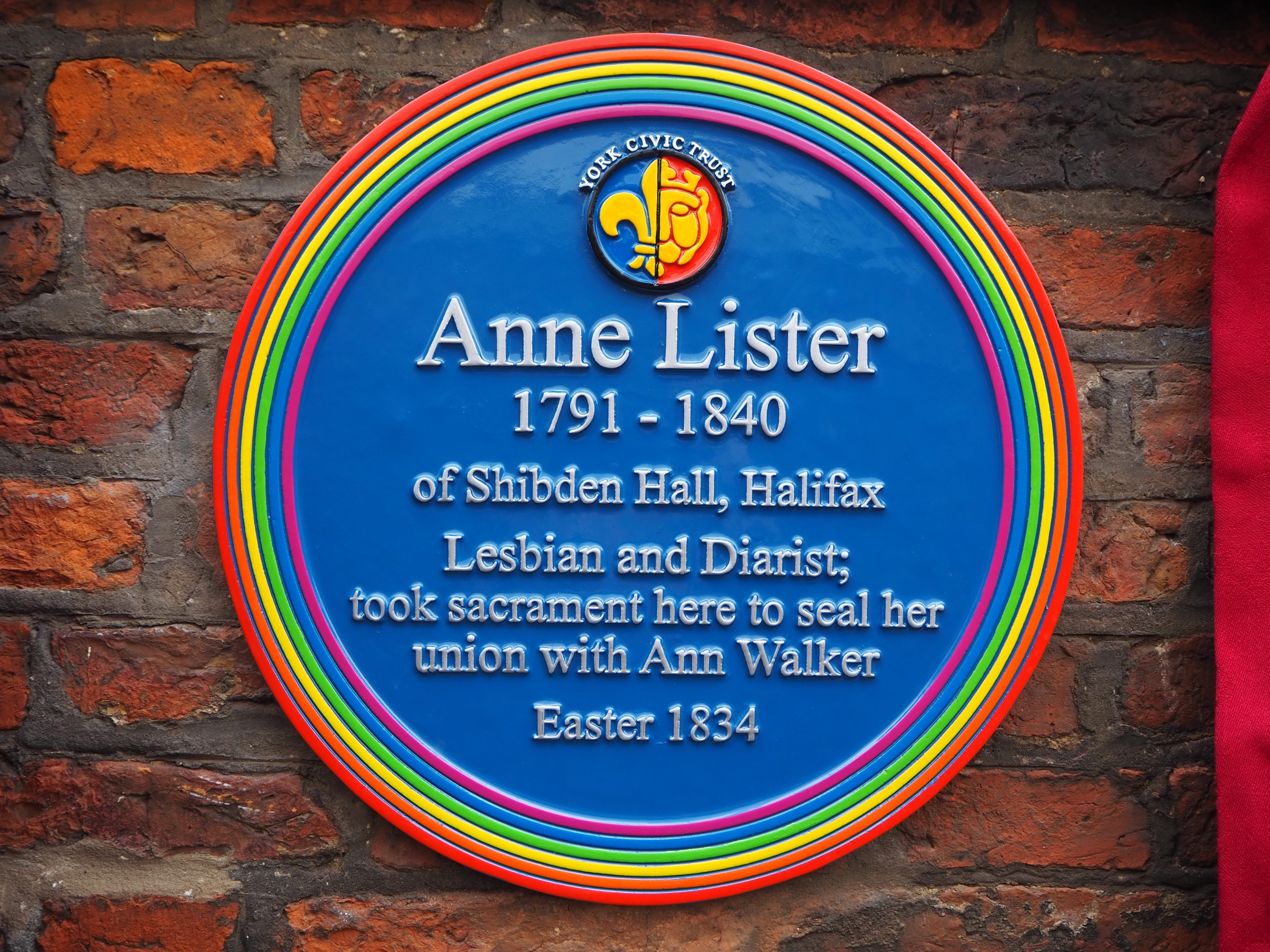
Rainbow plaque outside Holy Trinity Church, Goodramgate, York, dedicated to Anne Lister and Ann Walker, in 2019

The rainbow plaque programme is a UK scheme to create commemorative plaques to highlight significant people, places and moments in LGBTQIA+ history. Emulating established UK blue plaque programmes run by English Heritage, local authorities and other bodies, the first permanent rainbow plaque (a blue circular plaque with six rainbow colours around the circumference) was unveiled in York in July 2018. Some UK LGBT locations are denoted by pink plaques, an idea that predated rainbow plaques.

== History ==
The rainbow plaque programme was initiated in 2018 by York Civic Trust and the York LGBT Forum to honour lesbian diarist Anne Lister (1791–1840) and her partner Ann Walker, with the first version of a plaque unveiled on 24 July 2018, replaced with amended wording including the word 'lesbian' in February 2019. Temporary cardboard plaques were also placed on key sites during LGBT pride campaigns in York in 2018 and Leeds in 2019. (Note: In March 2024, a blue plaque was unveiled at Leeds University Union, commemorating the 50th anniversary of the first trans conference organised by the University (the location was among those earlier given a temporary plaque by Leeds Civic Trust).)

The permanent plaque initiative then extended nationally through the Wandsworth LGBTQ+ Forum and Studio Voltaire, unveiling permanent plaques for Oscar Wilde at Clapham Junction railway station on 24 July 2019, and for the 1985 film My Beautiful Laundrette on Wilcox Road in South Lambeth on 10 September 2021. A rainbow plaque was also unveiled in Burnley on 30 July 2021 marking the 50th anniversary of a meeting of the Campaign for Homosexual Equality held at Burnley Library. In Manchester's Sackville Park, a rainbow plaque was added to a memorial to Alan Turing.

In 2023, five further rainbow plaques were announced for London, supported by the Mayor of London's Untold Stories Fund and Wandsworth Oasis.

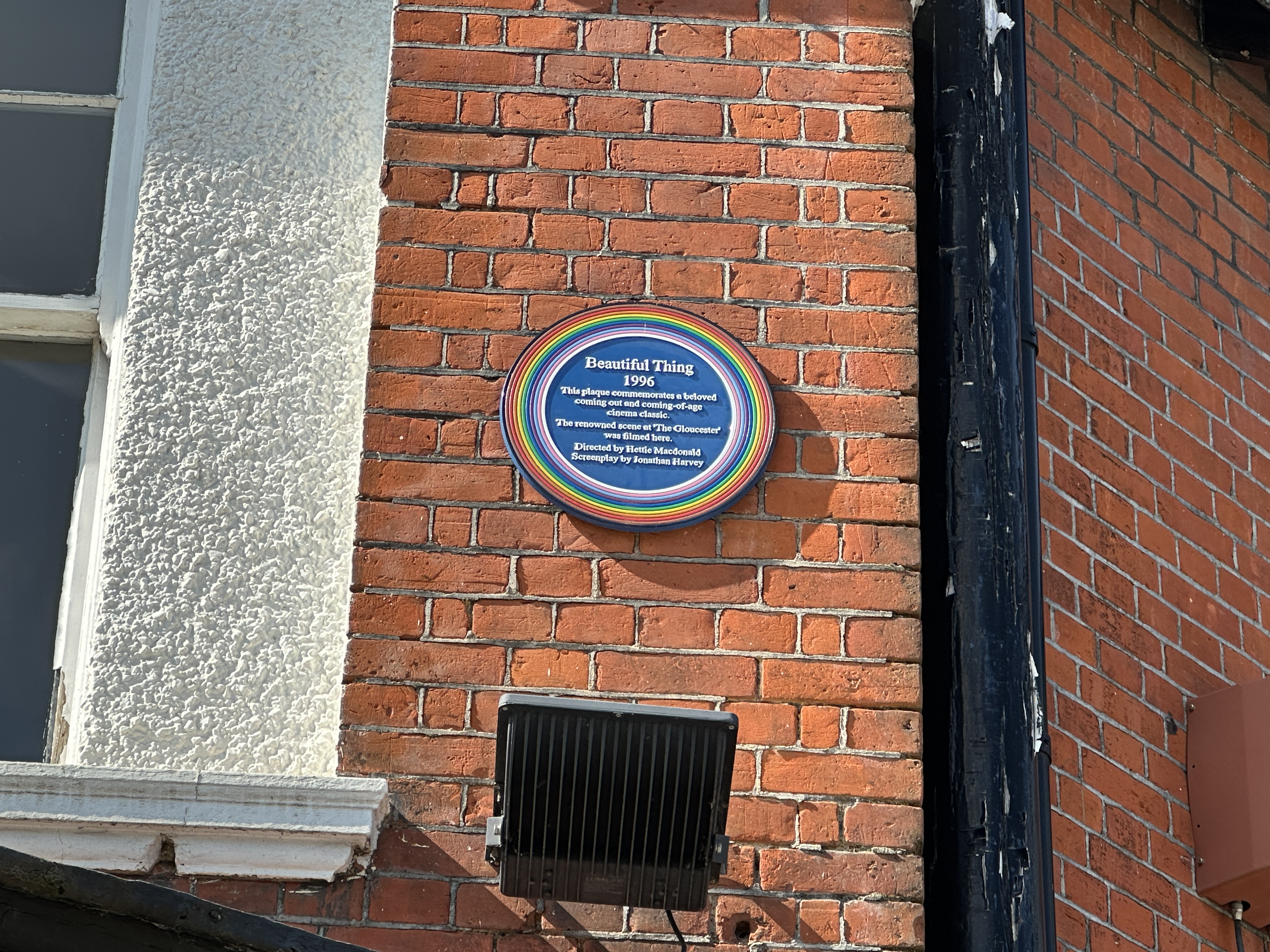
Beautiful Thing plaque at Greenwich Tavern, in 2025

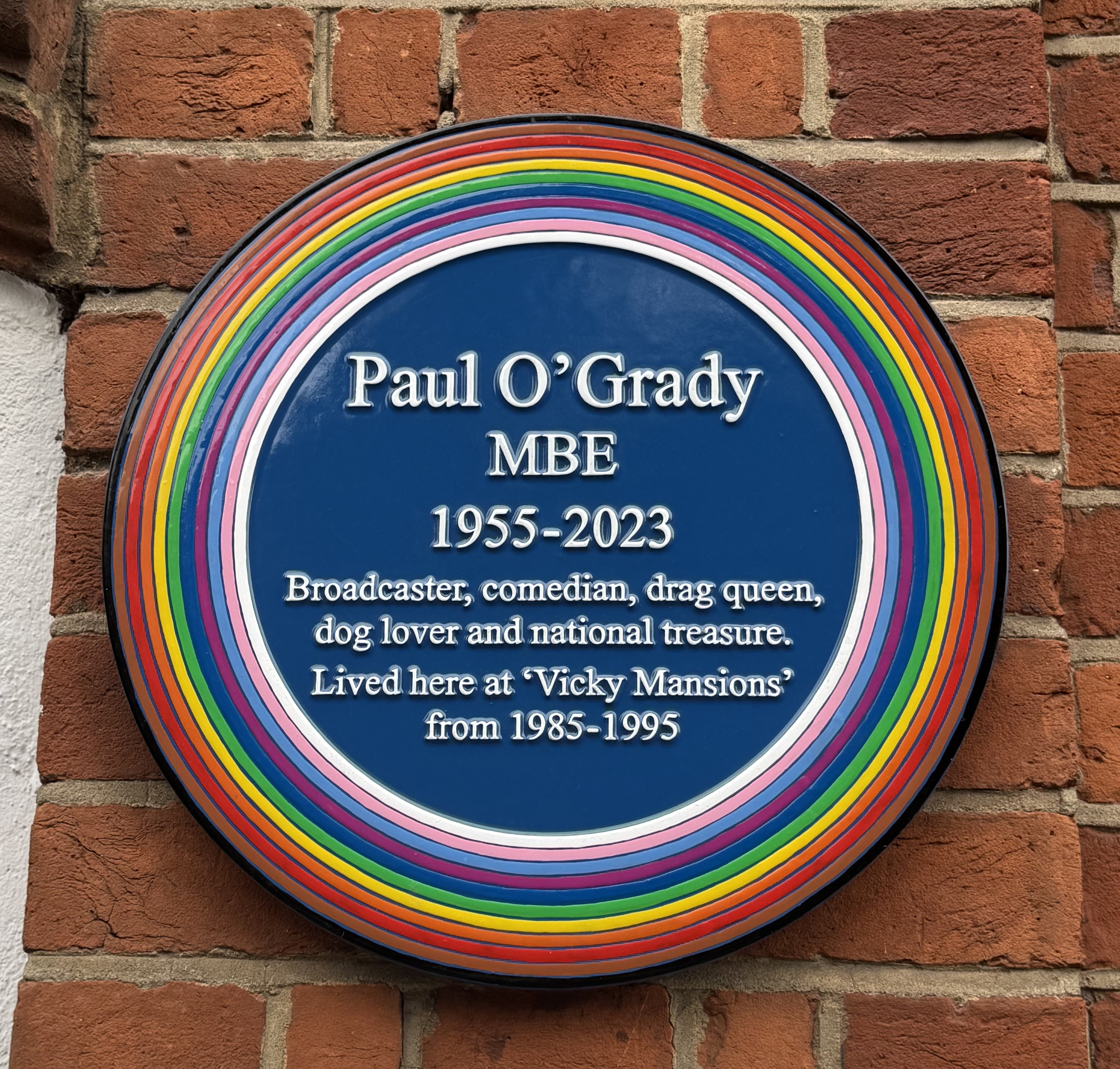
Rainbow Plaque commemorating Paul O'Grady at Victoria Mansions, South Lambeth Road, Vauxhall, London, in 2026

- Greenwich Tavern - Then a well-known gay bar, the Gloucester Arms (today the Greenwich Tavern) in Greenwich was the location of a key scene in the 1996 film Beautiful Thing which was set and filmed in Thamesmead and Greenwich in southeast London. The plaque was unveiled at the Greenwich Tavern on 23 July 2023.
- Black Lesbian and Gay Centre - Originally established in Haringey in 1985, the Black Lesbian and Gay Centre moved to a converted railway arch in Peckham in 1992. The plaque was unveiled on 18 February 2024.
- Jackie Forster - Jackie Forster (1926–1998) was a journalist, writer and lesbian rights activist who joined the Minorities Research Group and wrote for the UK's first lesbian publication Arena Three. She later set up the magazine and social group, Sappho. On 26 February 2025, the plaque was unveiled at her former home in Warwick Avenue.
- London Lighthouse - Founded in 1986 and based in Ladbroke Grove, the London Lighthouse was a centre and hospice for people with HIV/AIDS. The plaque was unveiled on 17 November 2023.
- Haringey Council - Haringey was a pioneer in the LGBTQIA+ rights movement in the 1980s, establishing a Lesbian and Gay Unit in 1986, while the local Positive Images group - formed to increase lesbian and gay visibility - was established in the same year.

In April 2024, Southwark Liberal Democrat councillor Victor Chamberlain proposed a rainbow plaque be unveiled on Blackfriars Road to commemorate James Pratt and John Smith, who in 1835 were the last men executed for sodomy in England.

In July 2024, a property developer proposed that a rainbow plaque be added to the 81 Endell Street site of The Caravan Club, a gay and lesbian-friendly club in the 1930s, today offices known as The Sail Loft.

On 26 June 2026, a rainbow plaque was unveiled at Victoria Mansions, Vauxhall - a block of flats where entertainer and TV presenter Paul O'Grady lived between 1985 and 1995. It was the seventh plaque erected in London by the London LGBT Forums Network.

== Pink plaques ==
Predating rainbow plaques, pink triangle plaque memorials have memorialised gay people killed in the Holocaust and victims of anti-gay violence. In the UK, the idea of pink plaques to more generally commemorate and celebrate LGBT heritage was promoted in a 1986 book, The Pink Plaque Guide to London, written by Michael Elliman and Frederick Roll and published by Gay Men's Press. Pink plaques were also discussed in Brighton in 2006, and a mobile phone app was later (2020) created to guide users to Brighton pink plaque locations.

Pink plaques have been unveiled in some UK locations to celebrate LGBT heritage. For example, the first pink plaque in Nottingham was unveiled at the New Foresters, a popular gay bar on St Ann's Street, on 17 September 2021. On 19 September 2021, a pink plaque commemorating Mary Wollstonecraft was due to be unveiled in Islington, London, near to a girls’ school she established in 1784, with plaques at other Islington locations to follow.

== See also ==
- List of Leeds Civic Trust plaques
