= Glen Berry =

British actor

Glen James Berry
- Born: 21 April 1978 (age 48); Romford, Greater London, England, UK
- Occupation: Actor
- Years active: 1993–2003
- Spouse: Terri Michelle Davies

Glen Berry (born 21 April 1978) is a retired British actor.

== Early life ==
Berry started attending the Anna Scher Theatre School in London in 1993, and his first steps in show business included a part as a skinhead in an ad for voluntary service.

== Career ==
Starting in 1995, Berry had a recurring role on the soap opera London Bridge.

He got his big break playing Jamie in the 1996 gay coming-of-age film Beautiful Thing, alongside another Anna Scher Theatre School pupil, Scott Neal.

Further acting credits include several BBC TV films, such as Blood and Fire and Between the Lines.

Other roles have included a cameo in ITV's The Bill TV series (again with Scott Neal) and a role as an office junior in the BBC legal drama Trust in 2003.

Berry retired from acting in 2003. As of 2026, he is Franchise Director for Group 1 Automotive.

== Selected filmography ==
Year	Title	Role	Notes
2003	The Bill	Terry Fraser	1 episode
2003	Trust	Paralegal	1 episode
2001	From Hell	Young Labourer	feature film
2001	Midsomer Murders	Ben	1 episode
2001	My Brother Tom	Policeman	feature film
1996	London Bridge	Jarvis Jones	4 episodes
1996	London's Burning	Steve	1 episode
1996	Beautiful Thing	Jamie Gangel	feature film
1995	Casualty	Russell	1 episode
1995	Grange Hill	Harry	2 episodes
1994	Between the Lines	Max	1 episode
