= Black Lesbian and Gay Centre =

Community centre in London, England

The Black Lesbian and Gay Centre (BLGC) was a community centre in London that ran from 1985 to 2000. The centre was founded by members of the Gay Black Group in response to "the overwhelming whiteness of the 'mainstream' LGBTQ+ scene, racism from within and outside of the scene, and the difficulties of coming out to families, who generally perceived homosexuality as a 'white' issue." It was first set up in Haringey with funding from the Greater London Council, and later moved to Peckham. A rainbow plaque in Peckham commemorates the BLGC.

== Location ==
The Gay Black Group were a collective of Black lesbians and gay men, who organised under the banner of political Blackness. In 1982 they approached the Greater London Council to set up the drop-in centre, with plans to provide advice, information, and a helpline. The GLC awarded funding to the project three years later in 1985. At the time it was founded, it did not have a permanent premises. This changed in 1992 when the centre moved to Peckham and took up residence in a former railway arch.

The centre was designed in 1992 by architect Shaheen Haq of Shaheen Haq Associates under a very challenging budget of £30,000 which included fees, materials and building costs.

The centre closed its permanent space in 1995. However, the last published bulletin is dated winter 2000 and stated their address as Westminster Bridge Road.

== Activities ==
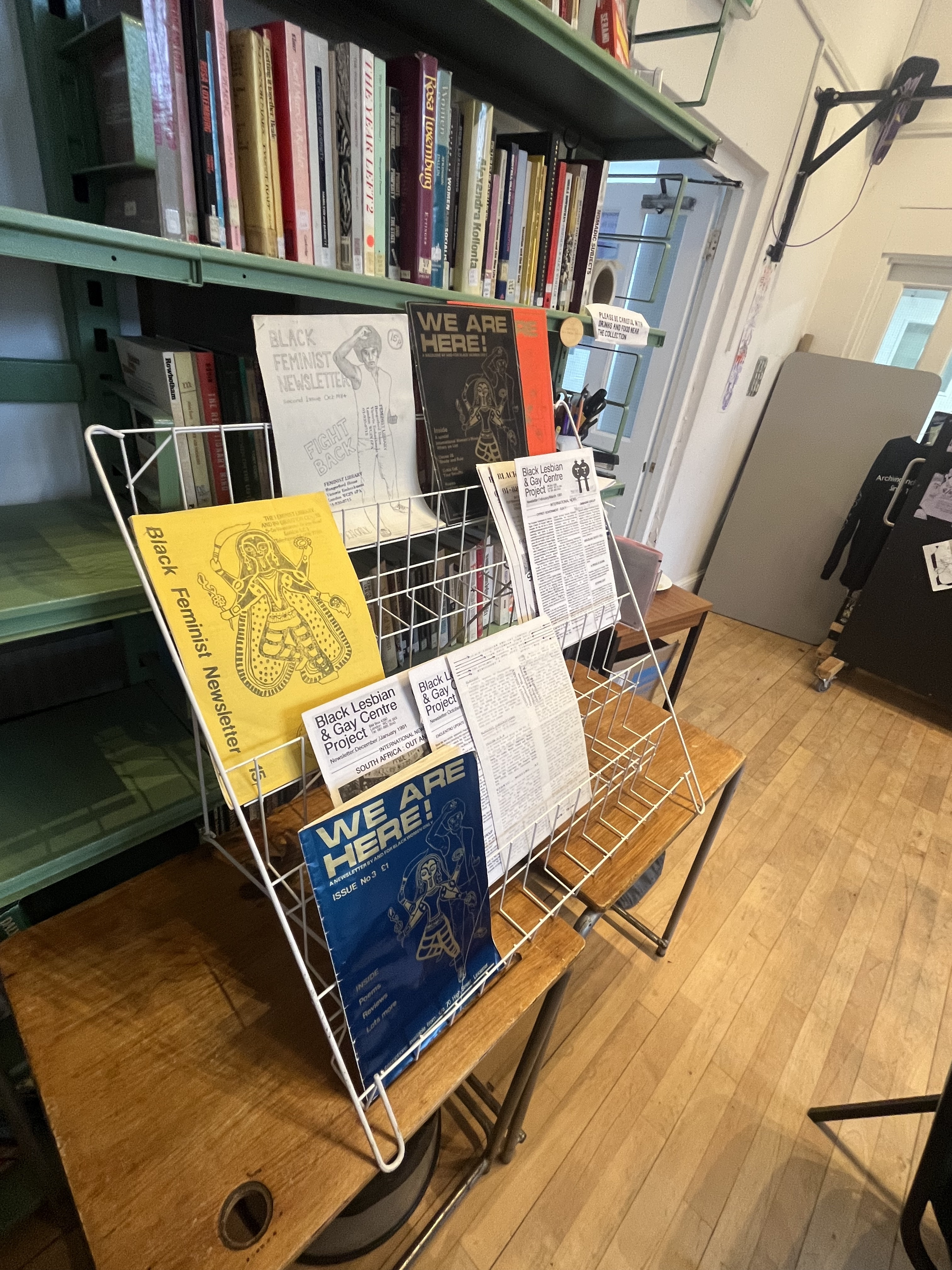
A collection of historical magazines on display in October 2024 in the Feminist Library hall, at the Sojourner Truth centre in Peckham, South London. Issues of the 'Black Lesbian & Gay Centre Project' newsletter are visible.

The group worked to provide a range of services and supported a number of actions, including: advice, counselling, and a telephone helpline; a library of relevant and specific material and a social space, even when they did not have a permanent venue.

The BLGC organised the Fifth International Lesbian and Gay People Conference, the first time it was held outside of North America.

The magazine Blackout was published from 1986 for Black lesbians and gay men to share events and resources. A newsletter for the "Black Lesbian & Gay Centre Project" was also printed.

The centre supported a boycott against the Black magazine The Voice about their treatment of out gay footballer Justin Fashanu.

== Legacy ==
In 2014 filmmaker Veronica McKenzie made a documentary about the Black Lesbian and Gay Centre titled Under Your Nose. The film was low budget and, reportedly, a labour of love, with McKenzie describing using her 'small savings' and having voluntary crew working for expenses. The film covered the history of the centre and surrounding political history, interviewing original members such as Dorothea Smartt, Dennis Carney, and Femi Otitoju.

McKenzie went on to found the Haringey Vanguard Archive in 2018. Held at the Bruce Castle museum in Tottenham, it prominently features the documents of the BLGC. The archive features oral history accounts from BLGC members Dennis Carney, Amber Djemal, and Savi Hensman.

On 18 February 2024, a rainbow plaque commemorating the centre was unveiled opposite 83 Bellenden Road in Peckham. The unveiling was held with a special screening of Under Your Nose at Peckhamplex Cinema with a Q&A with former members. The project was supported by Studio Voltaire, and the London LGBT Forums network.

Collections related to the BLGC are held by the Bishopsgate Institute, London. Material is also held at the Feminist Library, London.
