= Scott Neal =

British actor

- Born: 10 June 1978 (age 47); Islington, London, England
- Occupation: Actor
- Years active: 1991–present
- Notable work: Beautiful Thing (1996); The Bill (1991, 1995–99; 2002–03); EastEnders (2015)
- Partner: Philip O'Ferrall

Scott Neal (born 10 June 1978) is a British actor. He is best known for his roles in The Bill, first in guest roles as Ryan Keating and Carl Simms and later as a regular cast member as PC Luke Ashton, and for his breakout role in landmark LGBT film Beautiful Thing. He is also known for his role in EastEnders as Jason Adams.

== Career ==
He entered the Anna Scher Theatre School in 1989. He debuted in The Listening on Channel Four. He has participated in other TV shows such as EastEnders, Emmerdale, Bramwell, Prime Suspect, and London's Burning. He later became a regular appearance on the British television police drama The Bill, playing PC Luke Ashton, a character coming to terms with his sexuality. PC Ashton and Sgt. Craig Gilmore, played by Hywel Simons, shared the first romantic gay kiss between uniformed police officers on ITV (Episode No. 48 on 22 August 2002), prompting 160 complaints. Neal later admitted the storyline helped him confront his own sexual identity

He is widely recognised for having appeared in the 1996 gay drama film Beautiful Thing, where he played an abused teenager who falls for the unpopular boy next door played by Glen Berry, also a student at Anna Scher Theatre School.

Scott Neal is featured in Isolation and portrays Charlie, the lead male character in The Wonderland Experience, a feature film directed by Ben Hardyment and shot on location in southern India. In addition, he has participated in the plays Yours Fondly, Zekk Baxter and Morning Glory (2001) as well as in the musical Last Song of the Nightingale (2001).

In 2010 Neal was cast in Hollyoaks by former executive producer of The Bill Paul Marquess.

== Personal life ==
Scott Neal is in a relationship with British media executive and businessman Philip O'Ferrall.

== Filmography ==
Year	Title	Role	Notes
2015	EastEnders	Jason Adams	4 episodes
2012	Crime Stories	Andrew Frank	1 episode
2012	Emmerdale	Solicitor for Aaron Livesy	3 episodes
2011	We Need to Talk About Kieran	Alistair	film
2010–2012	Hollyoaks	Trevor (a.k.a. Alphonse)	6 episodes
2010	Emmerdale	Solicitor	9 episodes
2008	Emmerdale	Bob Hope's Solicitor	4 episodes
2006	Tug of War	Max	short
2003	The Saturday Show, BBC One	On-screen participant	1 episode
2003	SM:TV, ITV 1	Guest star	1 episode
2002–2003	The Bill	Luke Ashton	68 episodes
2002	The Wonderland Experience	Charlie	film
2001	London's Burning	Luke Jones	6 episodes
1999	Lily Savage's Blankety Blank, BBC One	On-screen participant	1 episode
1998	The VIBE, Channel 4	On-screen participant	1 episode
1998	Light Lunch, Channel 4	On-screen participant	1 episode
1997–1999	The Bill	Luke Ashton	56 episodes
1997	The Knock	Gang Member	1 episode
1996	Beautiful Thing	Ste Pearce	film
1996	The Bill	Ryan Keating	1 episode
1995	London's Burning	Neil	6 episodes
1995	The Bill	Carl Simms	1 episode
1995	The Smiths	Wayne Smith	TV movie
1995	Bramwell	Wilf	4 episodes
1995	Prime Suspect	Geoff	1 episode
1991	The Bill	Boy at School (uncredited)	1 episode
1991	The Listening		
