= Gisela Necker =

- Born: 10 November 1932
- Died: 24 June 2011 (aged 78); Berlin, Germany
- Occupations: Teacher and librarian
- Known for: Early lesbian activism

Gisela Necker (1932 - 2011) was an early lesbian activist active in Berlin from the 1970s until her death. She was a leading member of Homosexual Action West Berlin (HAW), co-founding its first lesbian group in the early 1970s. She later helped to found the Berlin women's centre and the Lesbian Action Centre. She died in Berlin at the age of 78.

== Early life ==
Gisela was born in eastern Germany growing up in the area that later became the German Democratic Republic. She was orphaned and trained to be a teacher at a young age, gaining her first teaching post at the age of 18. She moved to the West Germany in 1959 when she realised that the East and West Germany border would close.

== Activism ==
Living in Berlin and socialising in its homosexual and lesbian sector lead her to form the first lesbian section of HAW. In 1974 the group chose to archive the documents relevant to their activities, for example, posters and flyers and formed the archive Spinnboden. Gisela was also a founder of the Berlin women's centre and the Lesbian Action Centre.
