= Philip Bourchier O'Ferrall =

British media executive

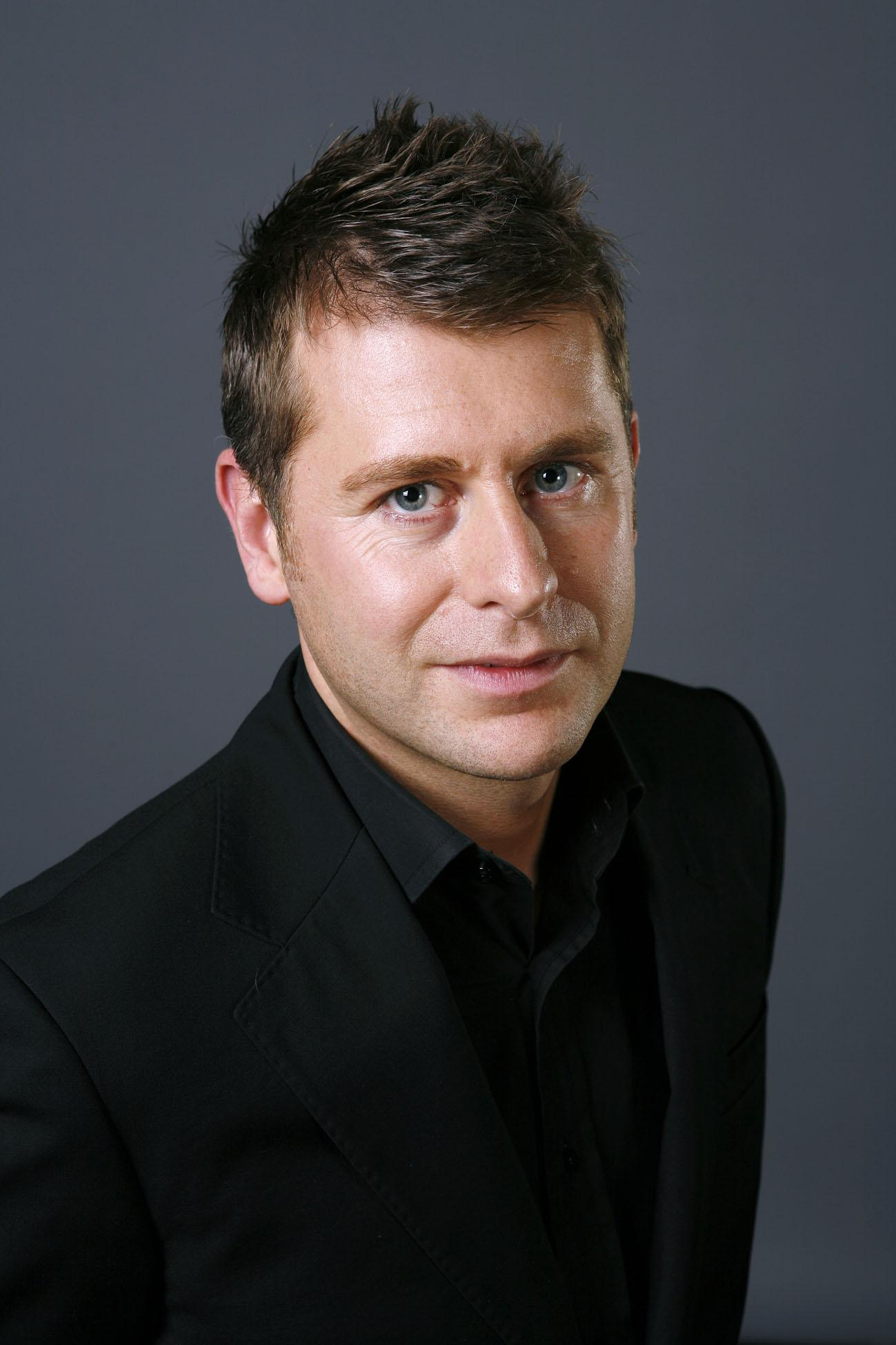

Philip Bourchier O’Ferrall is a British media executive. He is currently the Chief Executive of Outernet, an immersive entertainment district, named as London's most visited tourist attraction by The Times newspaper in 2023. Prior to this he spent over a decade at Viacom where he worked across brands including MTV, Nickelodeon, Paramount, Comedy Central & Channel 5.

O’Ferrall sits on the organising board of the Edinburgh International Television Festival. He is an active member of the Royal Television Society, The International Emmy Awards and BAFTA.

A frequent commentator on the changes in broadcasting and associated digital disruption, O'Ferrall is also non-executive director of Grammy award-winning music artist YungBlud who has located his YungBlud HQ and BRAT HQ at Outernet on Denmark Street. O'Ferrall is also co-founder and non-executive director of production company Travesty Media alongside comedian and writer Alan Carr.

In 2017 O’Ferrall was listed as one of the top LGBTi executives in business. The Evening Standard has identified him as one of London's most influential people. He is a member of the advisory board of the British LGBT Awards. He has a relationship with British actor Scott Neal.

O'Ferrall is a Leadership Fellow of The Society of Leadership Fellows Windsor Castle and a Descendant Member of The Society of the Friends of St George's and Descendants of the Knights of the Garter.

On 27 June 2022, The Sunday Times revealed that O’Ferrall was leading a consortium bid for the UK's Channel 4 Television Network.

In March 2023 O'Ferrall was appointed to the International Music Industry Advisory Board for In Place of War, a charity designed to enable grassroots change-makers in music, theatre and the arts to transform a culture of violence and suffering into hope, opportunity and freedom. Musicians Brian Eno and Peter Gabriel are fellow board members.

In December 2024 O'Ferrall was appointed co-chair of London's bid to host the World Pride event in 2032, supported by the Mayor of London Sir Sadiq Khan. He shares the role with Rebecca Paises, Interim chief executive of Pride in London.
