= Geoffrey Ogwaro =

Geoffrey Feni Ogwaro
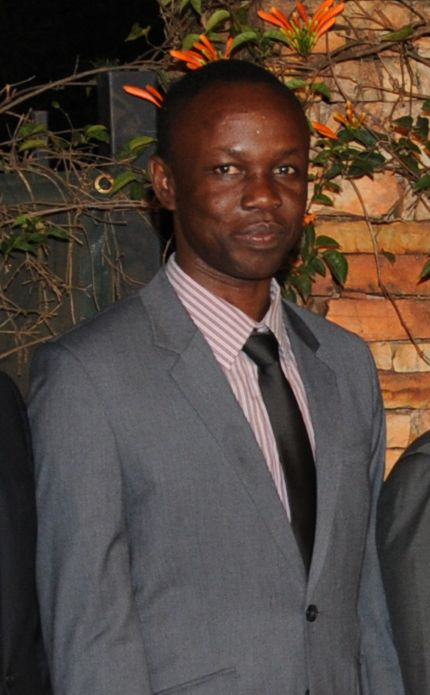
- Born: Arua District, Uganda
- Education: Makerere University; University of Pretoria
- Years active: 2010–present
- Awards: 2011 Human Rights Defender Award; Human Rights and Democracy through Photography

Geoffrey Feni Ogwaro, sometimes called Jeff Ogwaro, is a Ugandan human rights advocate. He has worked as a co-coordinator of the Civil Society Coalition on Human Rights and Constitutional Law and teaching assistant at Makerere University.

== Activism ==
Ogwaro, as a young man started fighting for LGBT rights when he got a chance to work for a human rights organisation. His name appeared on the front page of the Mar. 1 issue of Red Pepper as a queer man, a few days after the Ugandan president Yoweri Museveni signed the anti-gay law. Ogwaro has worked on several LGBT activism projects with Sexual Minorities Uganda, Refugee Law Project and at the Center for Human Rights.

== Education ==
Ogwaro attended Makerere University Institute of Adult and Continuing Education where he taught as a teaching assistant soon after his graduation. He earned his masters in Human Rights and Democracy from the University of Pretoria in 2015.

== Recognition and awards ==
In 2012, Ogwaro, along with other Ugandan LGBT and Human Rights activists, were recognized by the then-US Secretary of State Hillary Clinton for their work in opposing the draft law that called a death penalty for LGBT people. Ogwaro was runner up for the Human Rights and Democracy through Photography Competition at the Center for Human Rights, University of Pretoria.

== See also ==
- Stella Nyanzi
- Frank Mugisha
- Pepe Julian Onziema
