= Cutty Sark, Greenwich =

Pub in Greenwich, London

Cutty Sark
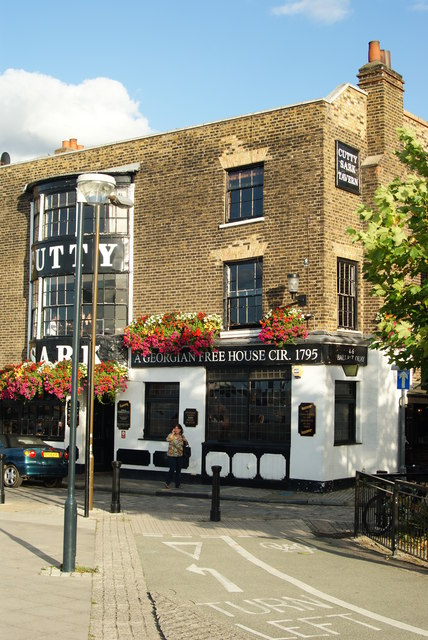
- The Cutty Sark

- Location within Royal Borough of Greenwich Location within Greater London

General information
- Location: 6–7 Ballast Quay, Greenwich, London, England
- Coordinates: 51°29′11″N 0°00′02″W

Design and construction
- Designations

Listed Building – Grade II
- Official name: Cutty Sark Public House
- Designated: 8 June 1973
- Reference no.: 1358923

Website
- www.cuttysarkse10.co.uk

The Cutty Sark is a Grade II listed public house at 6-7 Ballast Quay, Greenwich, London.

It was built in the early 19th century, replacing an earlier pub, The Green Man. It was initially called The Union Tavern, but was renamed The Cutty Sark Tavern when the tea clipper came to Greenwich in 1951.

The building comprises three storeys with widely spaced, Georgian bow windows.

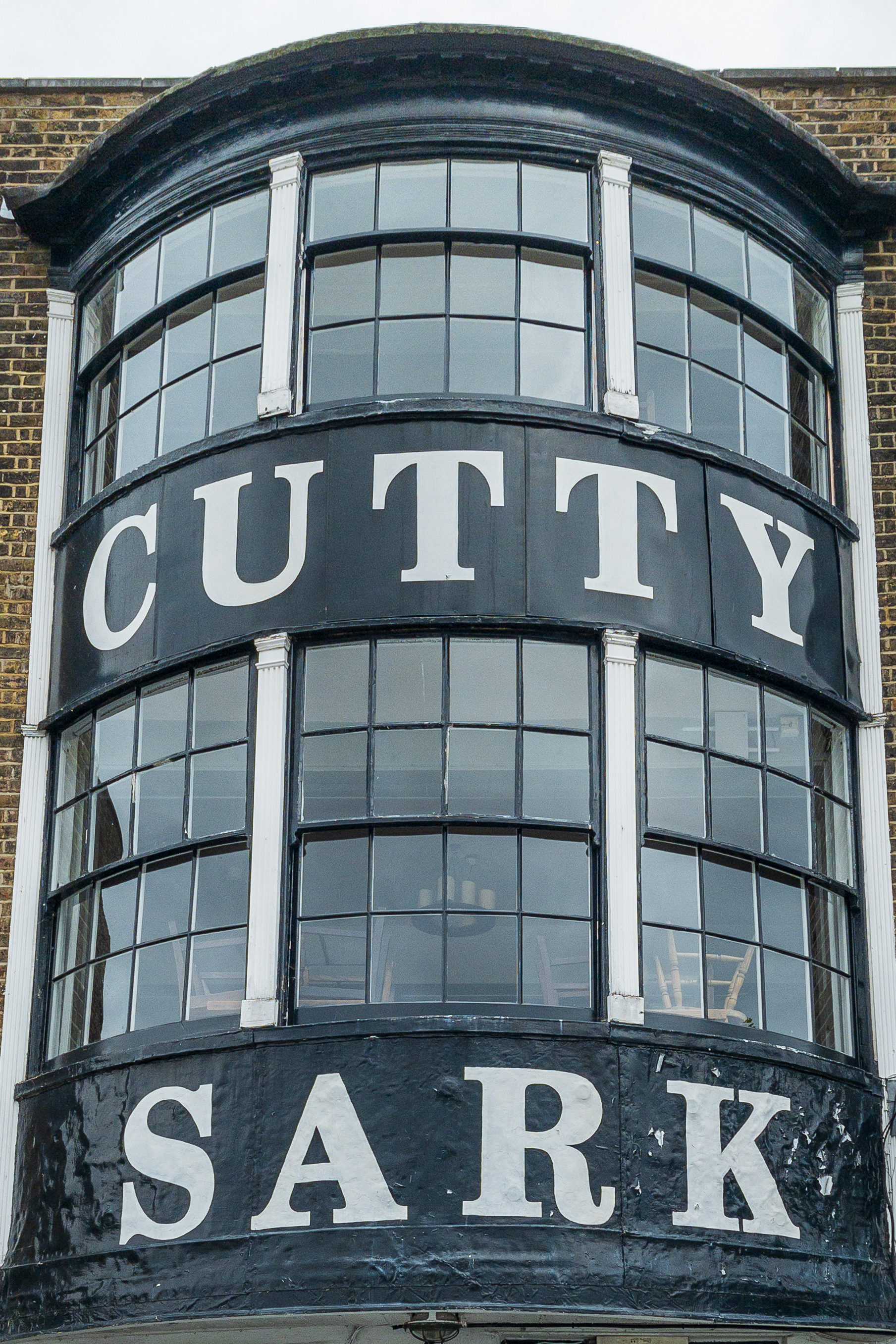
Bow windows of the Cutty Sark
