= List of gay, lesbian or bisexual people: T–V =

This is a partial list of notable people who were or are gay men, lesbian or bisexual.

The historical concept and definition of sexual orientation varies and has changed greatly over time; for example the general term "gay" was not used to describe sexual orientation until the mid-20th century. A number of different classification schemes have been used to describe sexual orientation since the mid-19th century, and scholars have often defined the term "sexual orientation" in divergent ways. Indeed, several studies have found that much of the research about sexual orientation has failed to define the term at all, making it difficult to reconcile the results of different studies. However, most definitions include a psychological component (such as the direction of an individual's erotic desire) and/or a behavioural component (which focuses on the sex of the individual's sexual partner/s). Some prefer to simply follow an individual's self-definition or identity.

The high prevalence of people from the West on this list may be due to societal attitudes towards homosexuality. The Pew Research Center's 2013 Global Attitudes Survey found that there is "greater acceptance in more secular and affluent countries," with "publics in 39 countries [having] broad acceptance of homosexuality in North America, the European Union, and much of Latin America, but equally widespread rejection in predominantly Muslim nations and in Africa, as well as in parts of Asia and in Russia. Opinion about the acceptability of homosexuality is divided in Israel, Poland and Bolivia.” As of 2013, Americans are divided – a majority (60 percent) believes homosexuality should be accepted, while 33 percent disagree.

== T ==
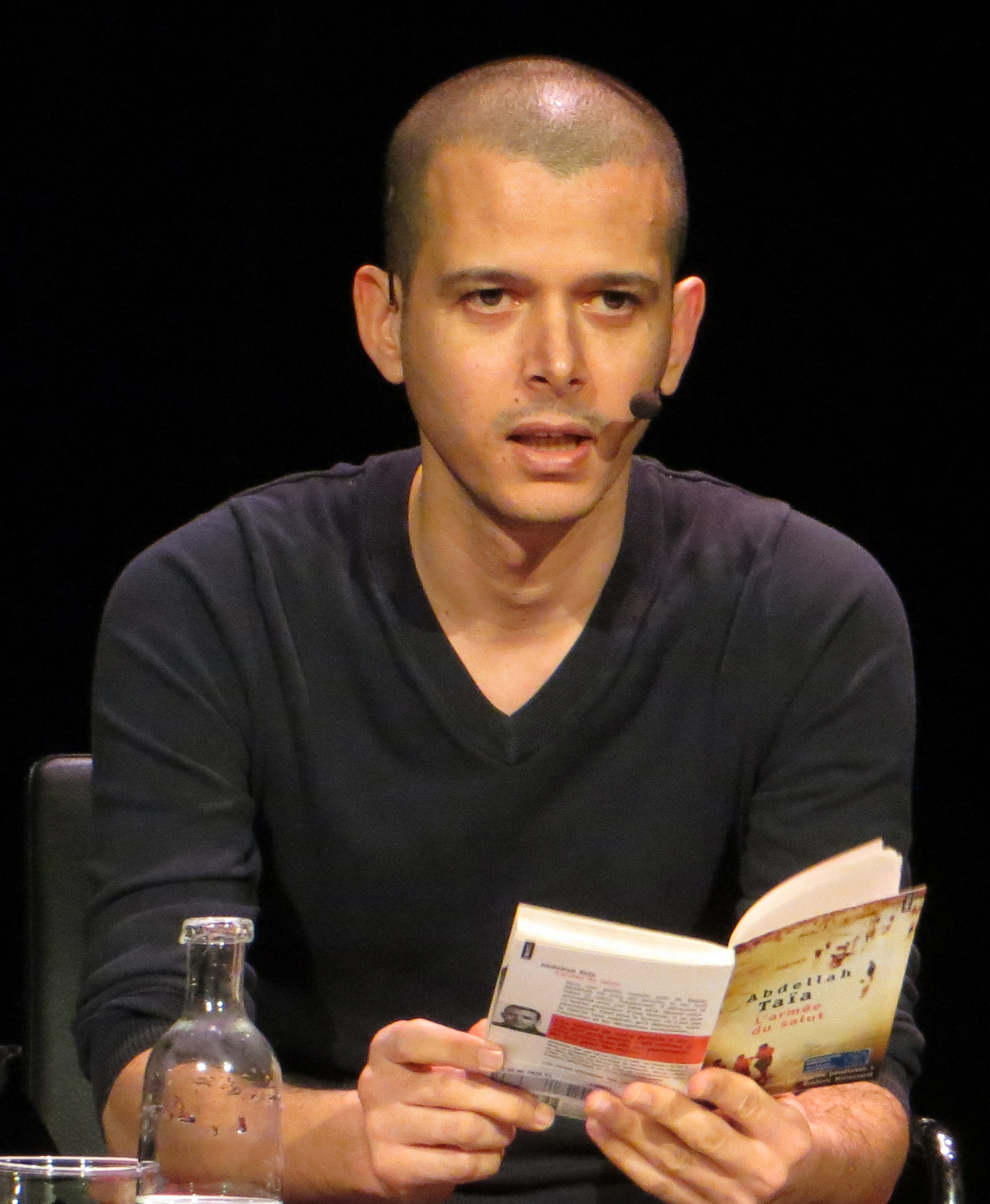
Author and filmmaker Abdellah Taïa

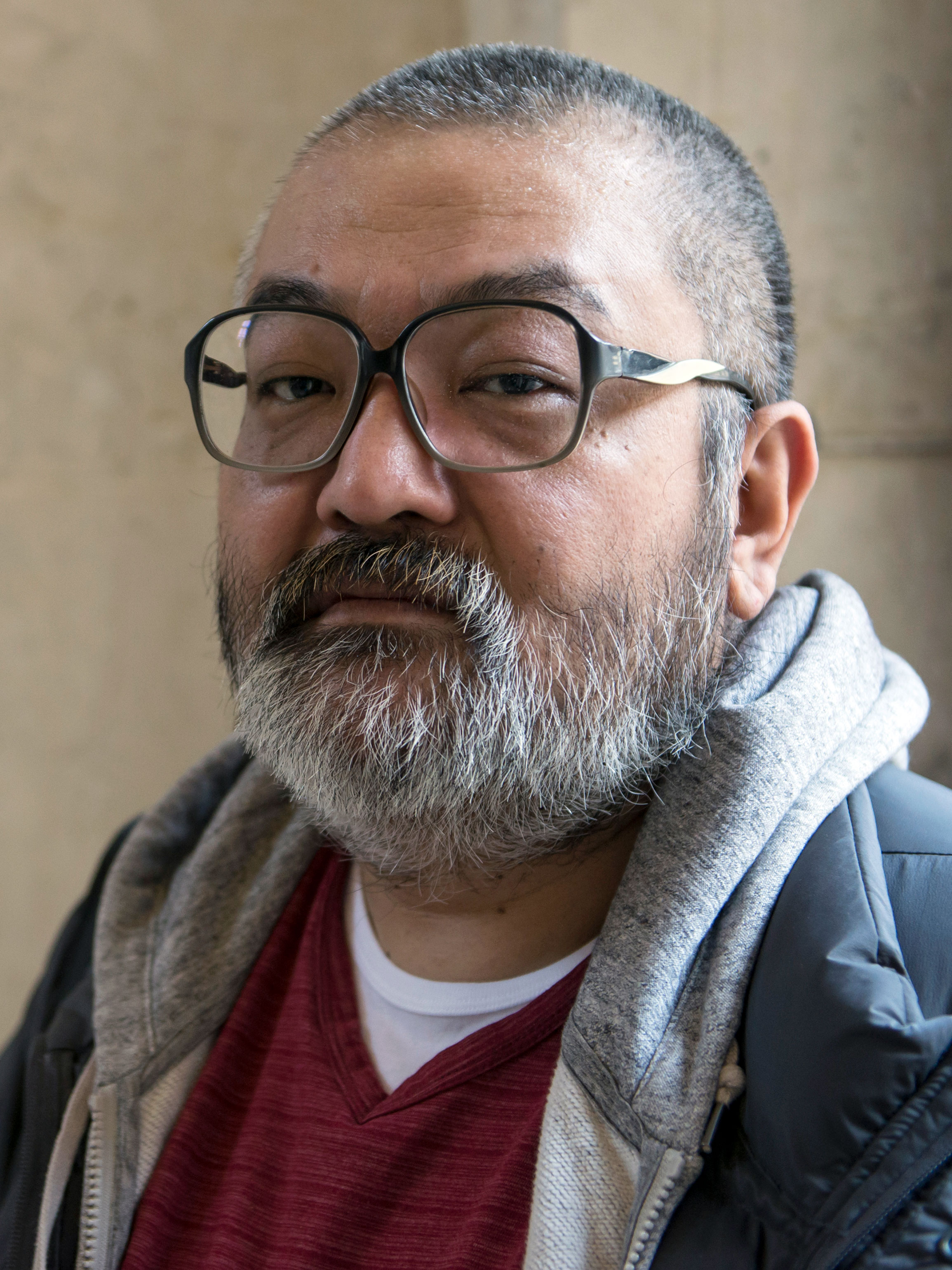
Manga artist Gengoroh Tagame

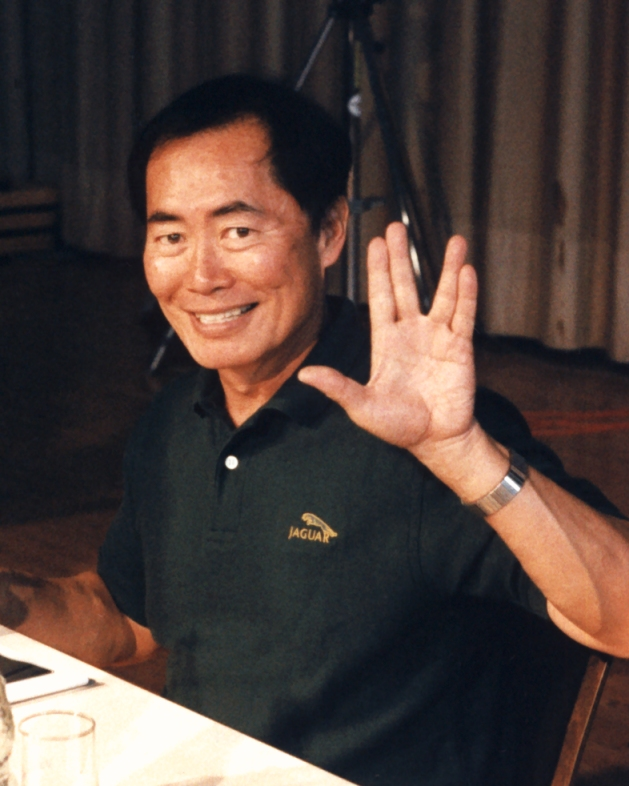
Actor George Takei

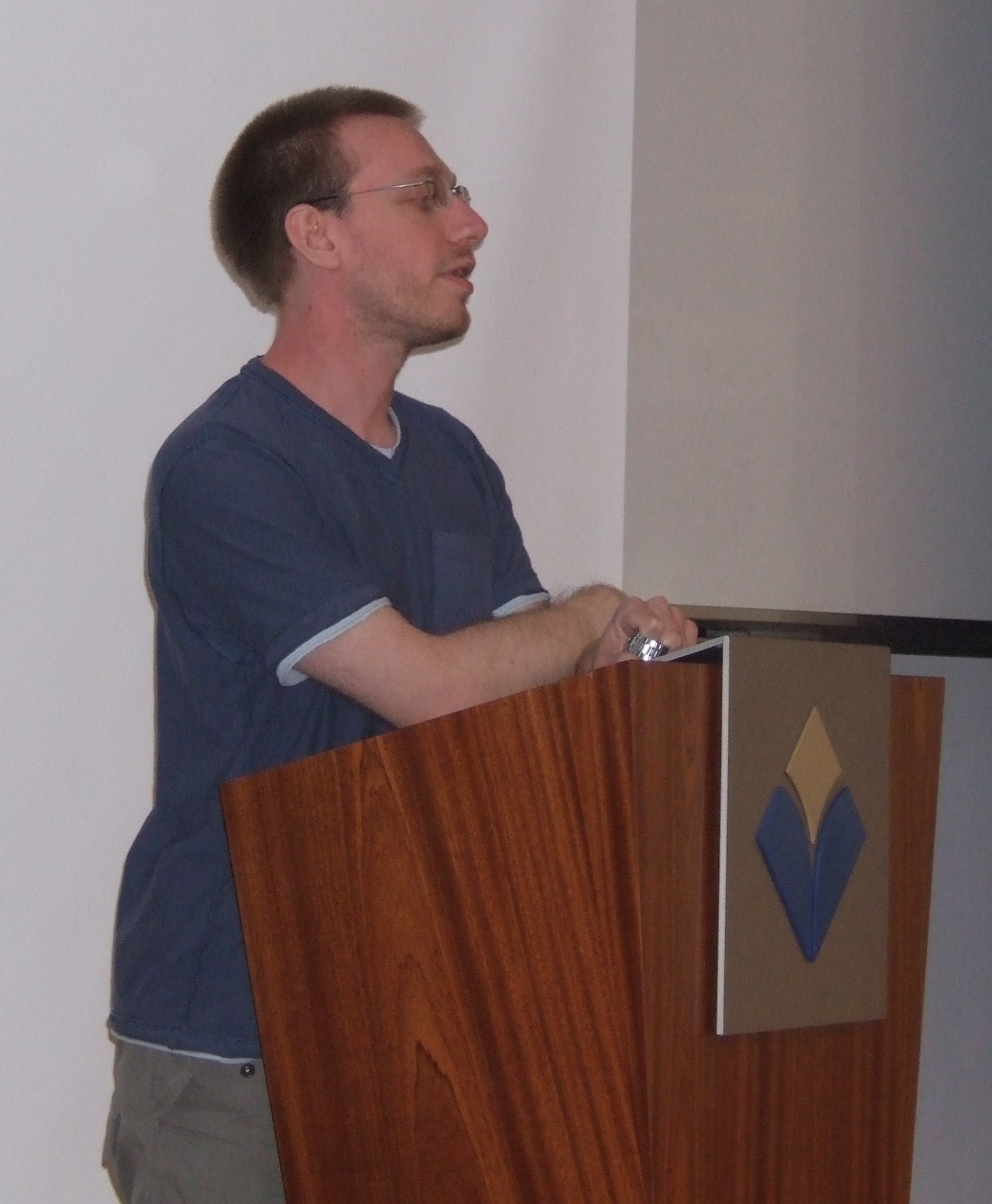
Memoirist Daniel Tammet

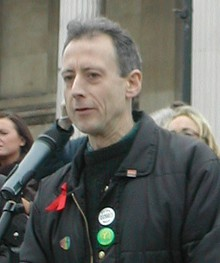
Activist Peter Tatchell

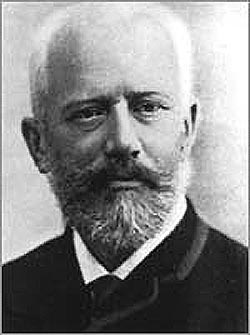
Classical composer Pyotr Ilyich Tchaikovsky

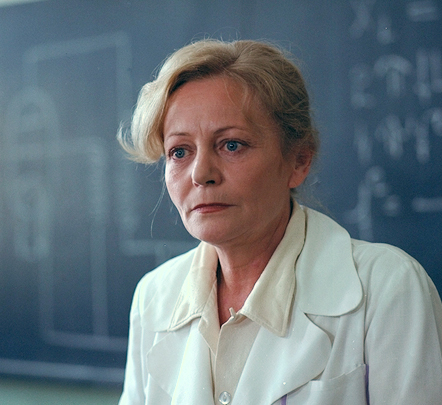
Actress Hédi Temessy

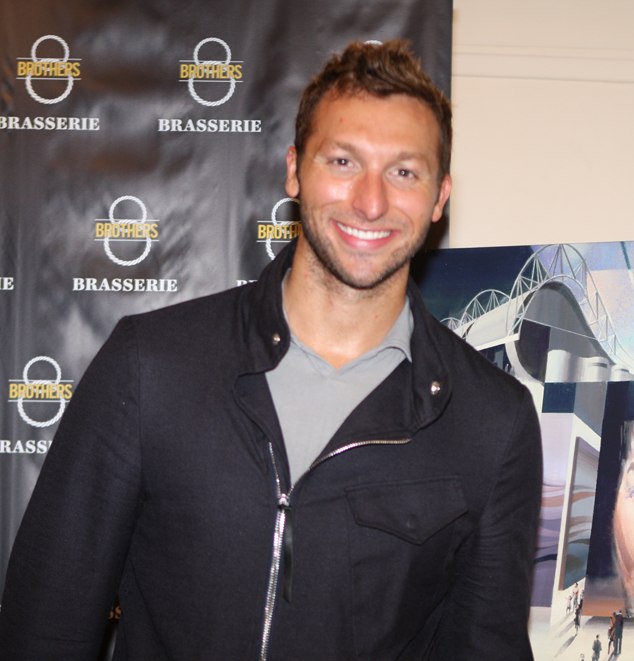
Swimmer Ian Thorpe

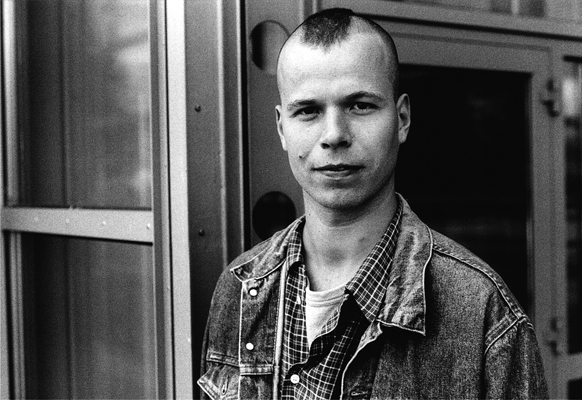
Photographer Wolfgang Tillmans

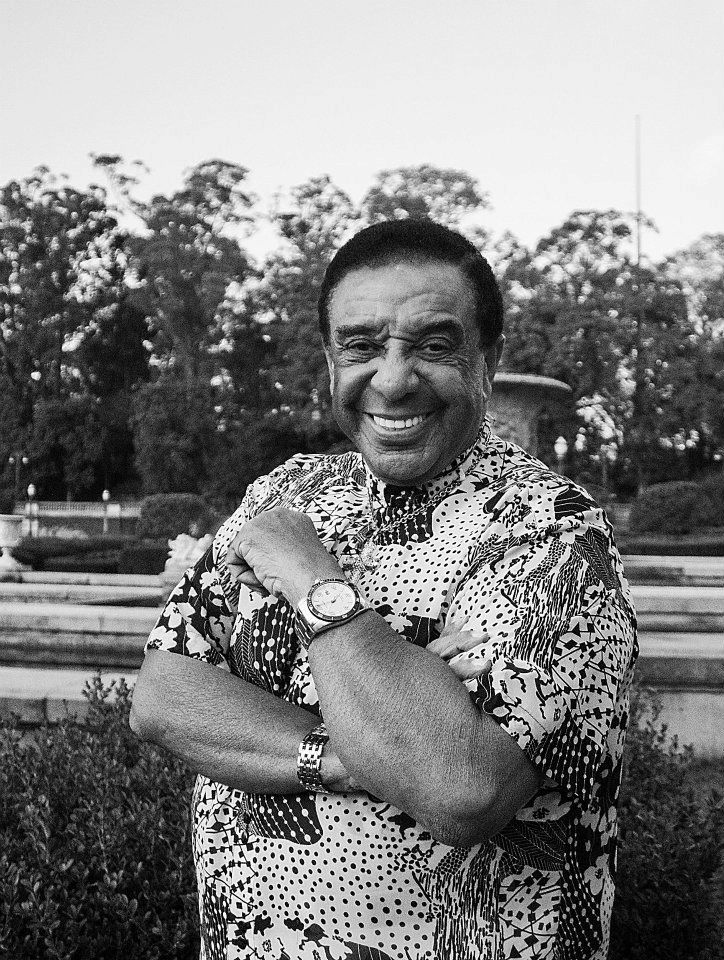
Singer and politician Agnaldo Timóteo

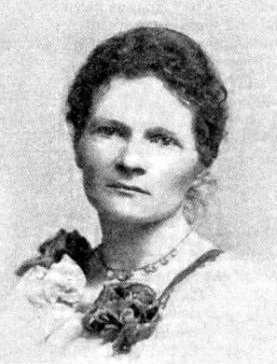
Physician Margaret Todd

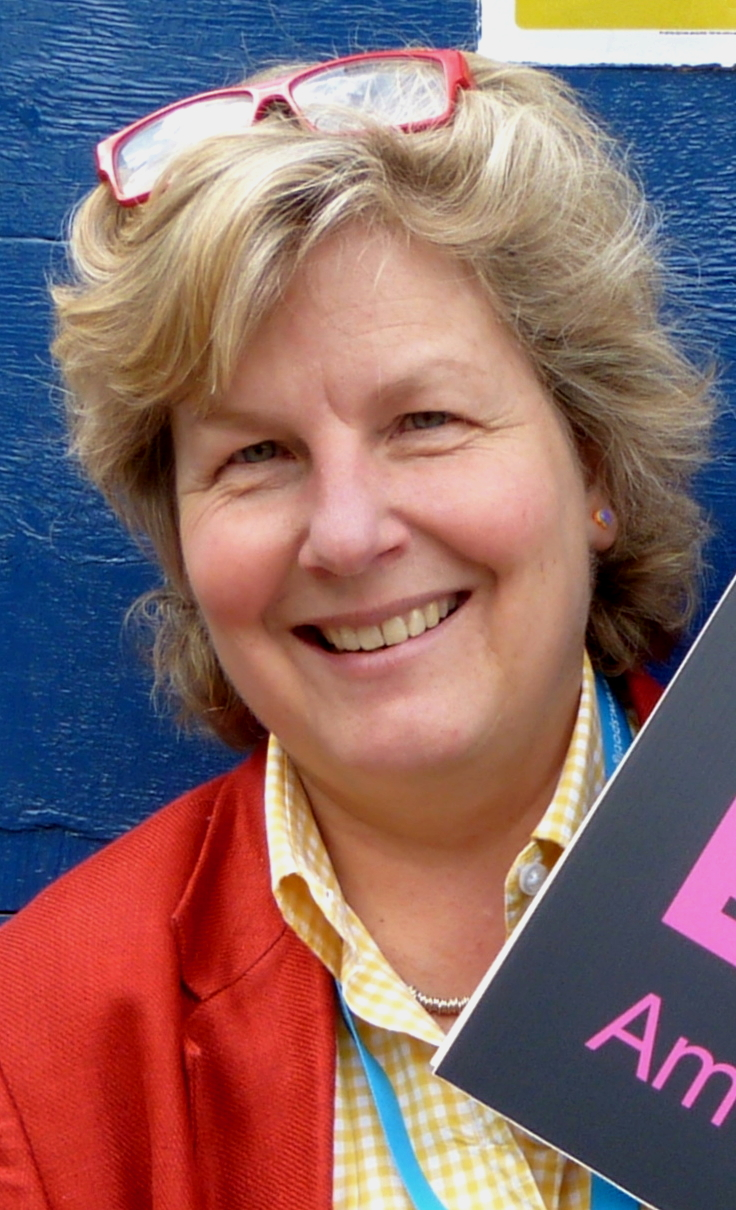
Writer, comedian, broadcaster and actress Sandi Toksvig

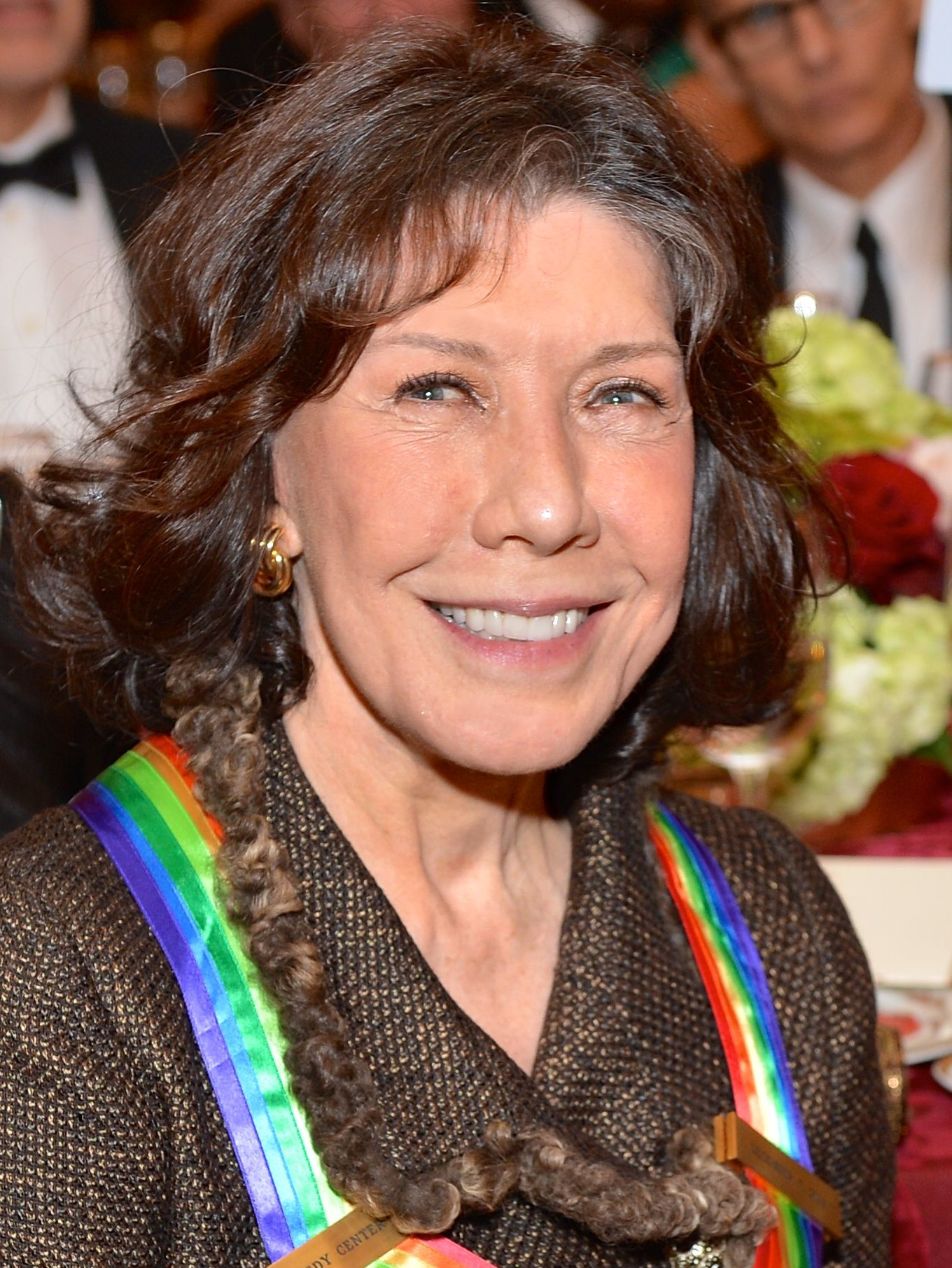
Actress and comedian Lily Tomlin

Attorney, lecturer and LGBT rights activist Maurice Tomlinson

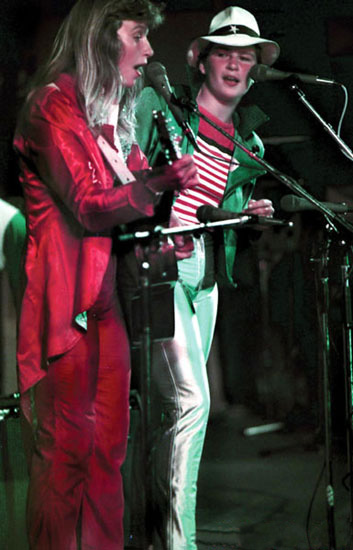
Folk singers Topp Twins

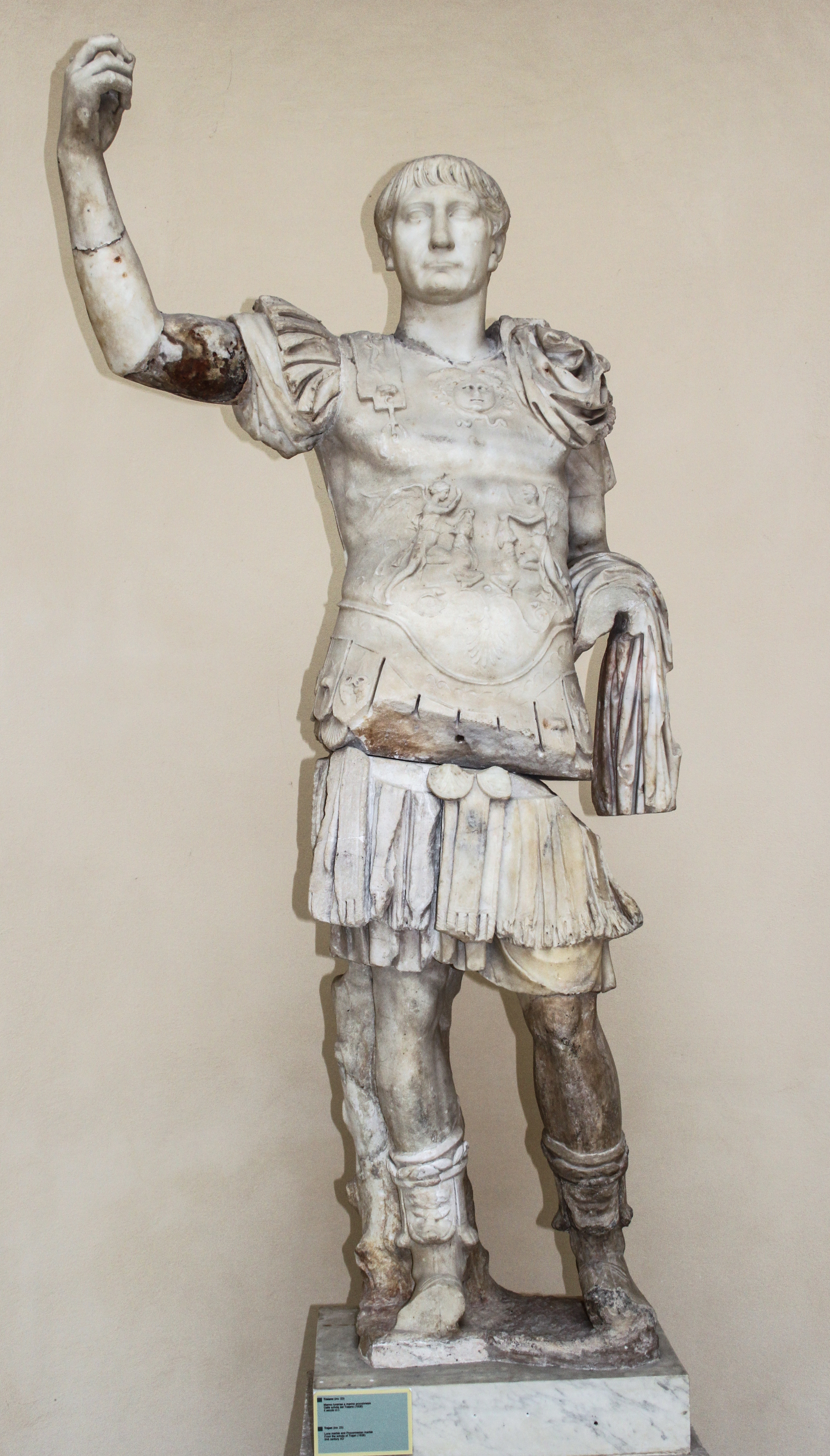
Roman emperor Trajan

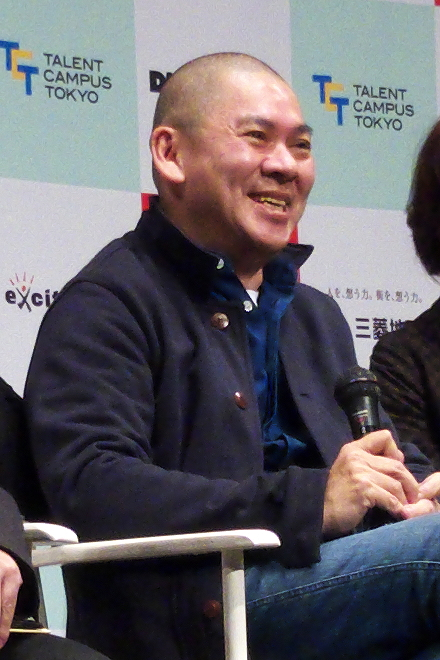
Filmmaker Tsai Ming-liang

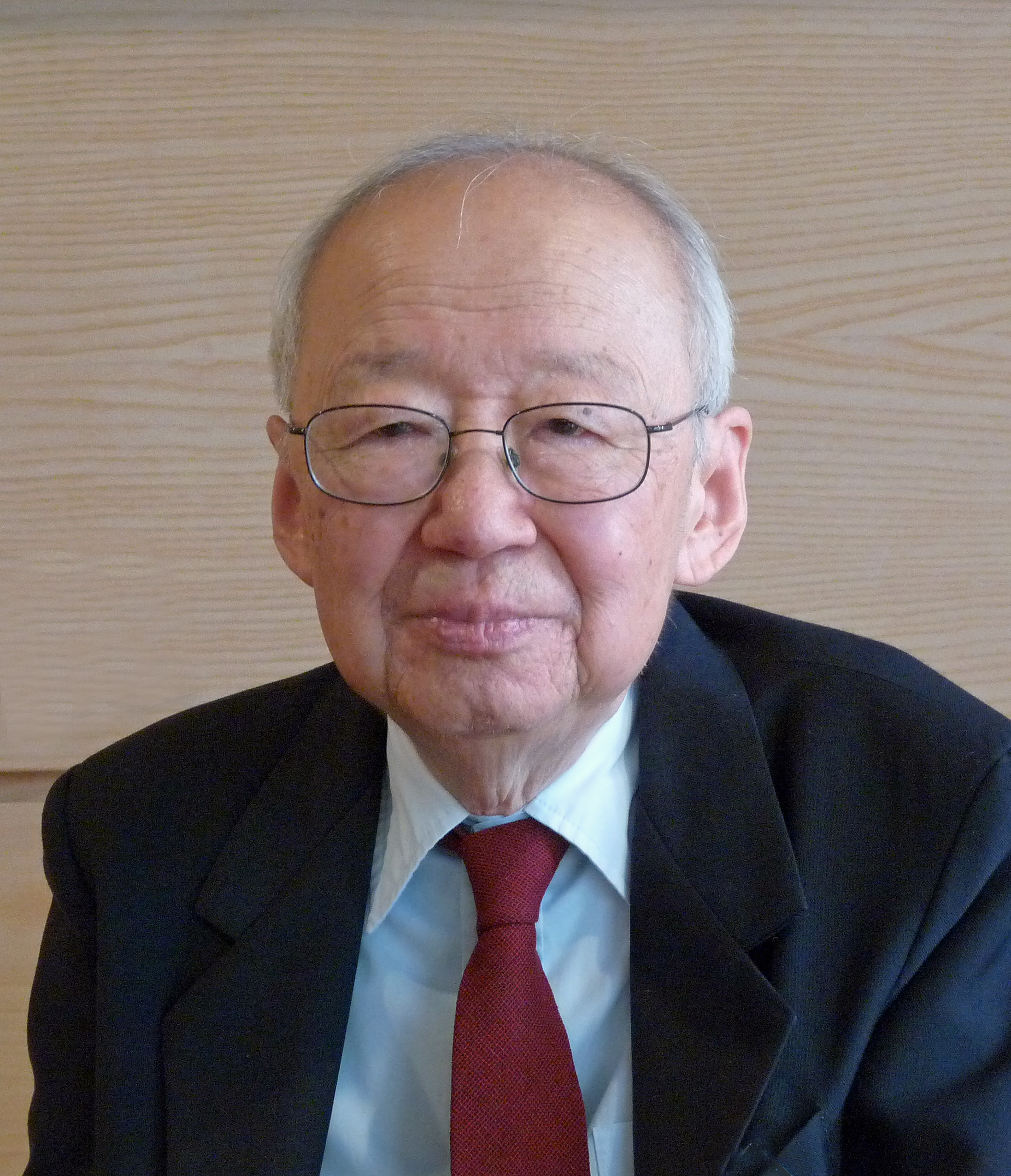
Geographer Yi-Fu Tuan

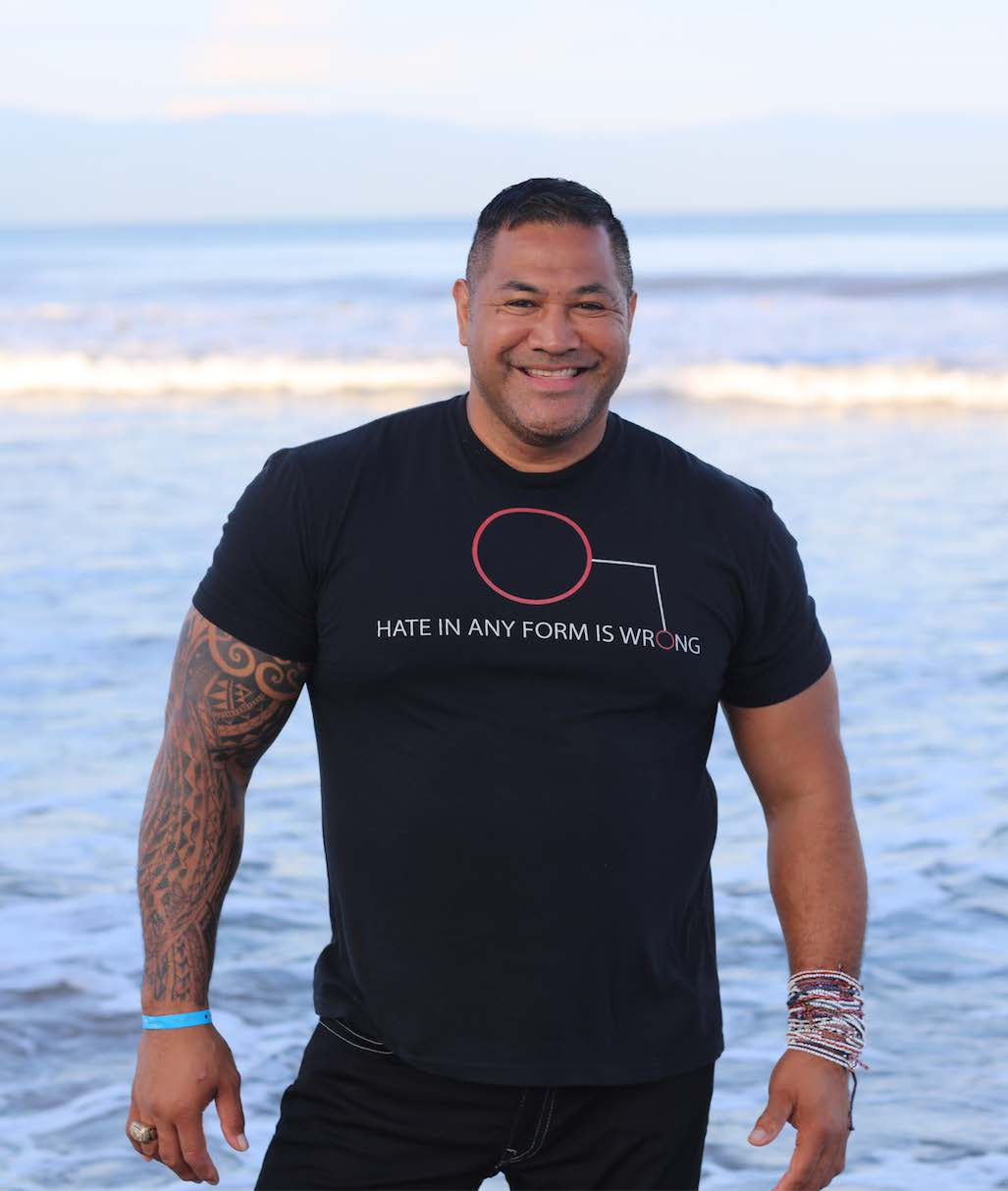
Football player Esera Tuaolo

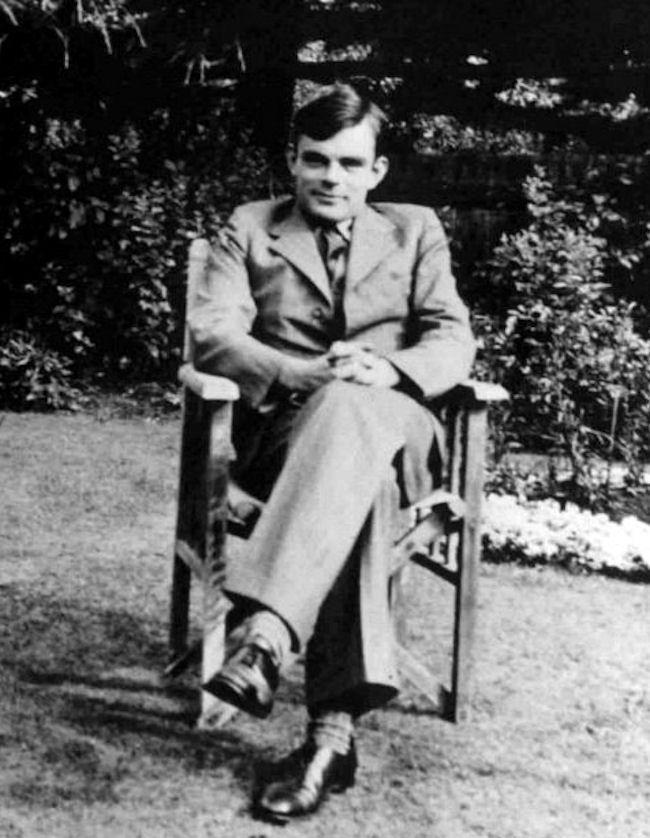
Mathematician, computer scientist, logician and cryptanalyst Alan Turing

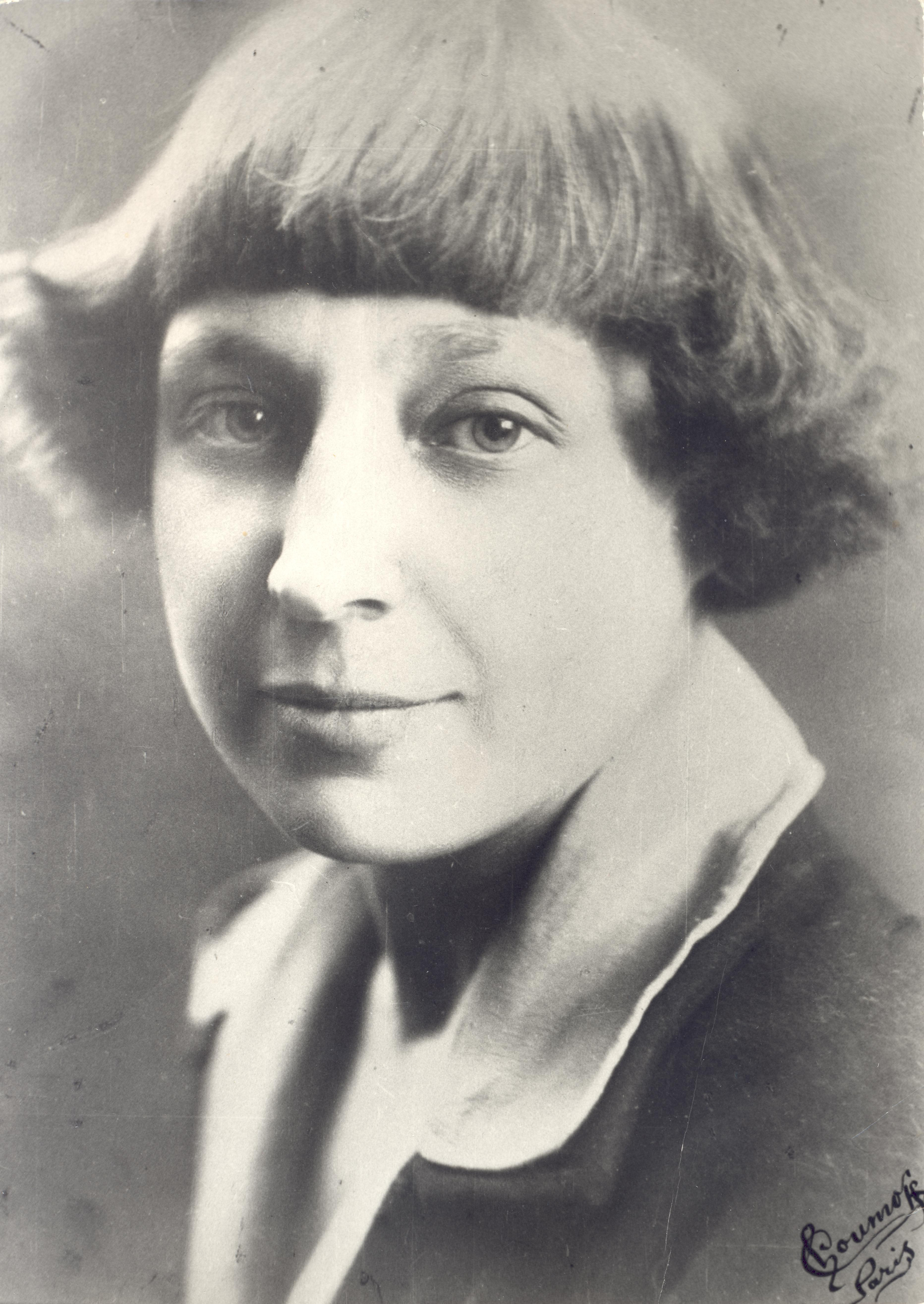
Poet Marina Tsvetaeva

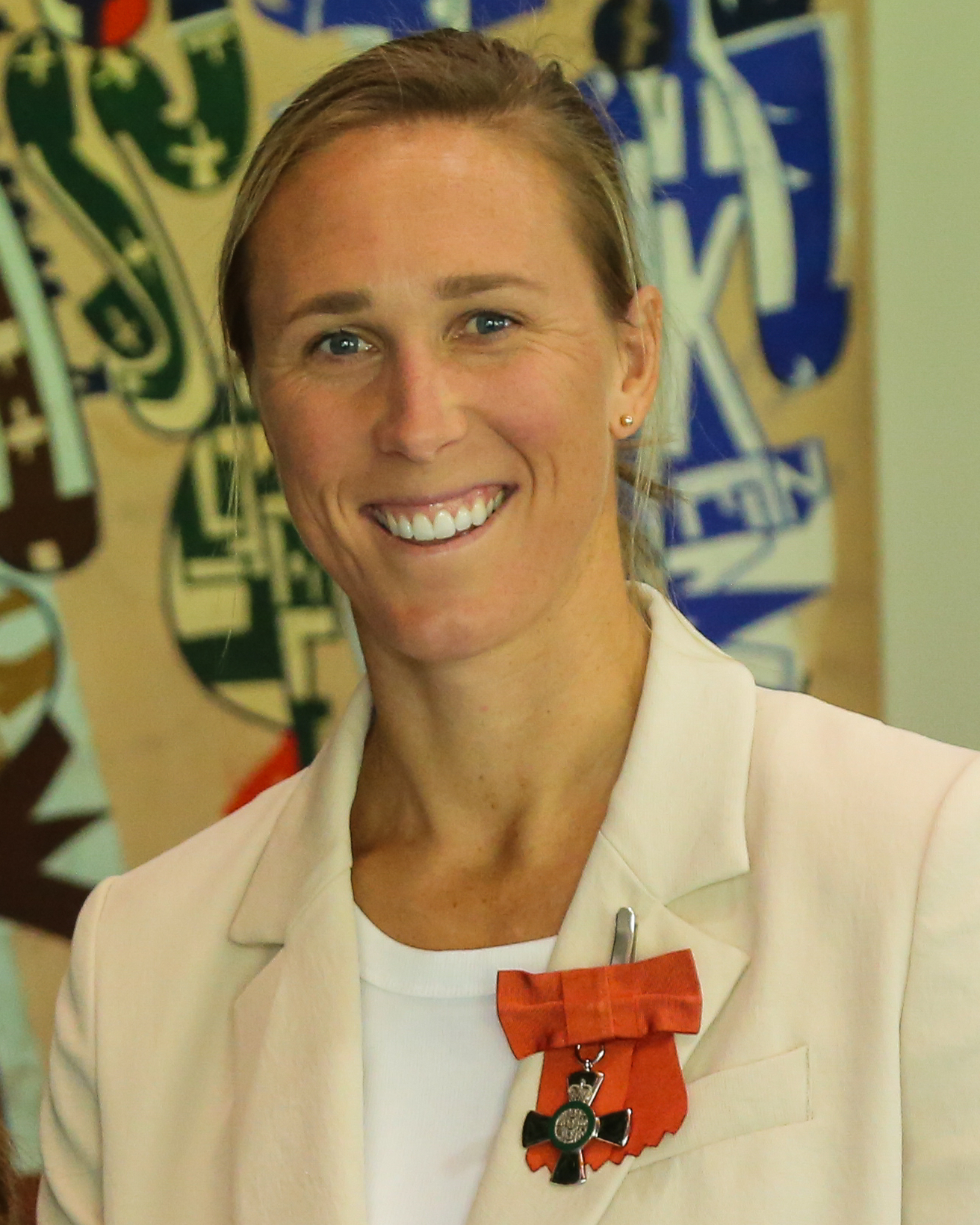
Rower Emma Twigg

Name	Lifetime	Nationality	Notable as	Notes
Shaun T	b. 1978	American	Fitness trainer	G
Monica Tabengwa	b. ?	Botswanan	Lawyer, researcher for Pan-Africa ILGA and Human Rights Watch	L
Mullah Taha	b. ?	Iranian	Shia cleric	G
Lea Tahuhu	b. 1990	New Zealand	Cricketer	L
Abdellah Taïa	b. 1973	Moroccan	Author, filmmaker	G
Blyth Tait	b. 1961	New Zealand	Equestrian	G
Gengoroh Tagame	b. 1964	Japanese	Manga artist	G
Kenzō Takada	1939–2020	Japanese-French	Fashion designer (Kenzo)	G
Mutsuo Takahashi	b. 1937	Japanese	Author, poet	G
Mark Takano	b. 1960	American	Politician	G
George Takei	b. 1937	American	Actor	G
Nanae Takizawa	b. 1987	Japanese	Volleyball player	L
Costas Taktsis	1927–1988	Greek	Writer	G
Olga Talamante	b. 1950	Mexican American	Political activist	L
Michael Talbot	1953–1992	American	Author	G
André Leon Talley	1949–2022	American	Editor	G
Tallulah	1948–2008	German	DJ	G
Billye Talmadge	1929–2018	American	Activist, educator	L
Adrian Tam	b. ?	American	Politician	G
Mariko Tamaki	b. 1975	Canadian	Writer, artist	L
Alfhild Tamm	1876–1959	Swedish	Psychiatrist, psychoanalyst	L
Daniel Tammet	b. 1979	English	Memoirist, autistic savant	G
Theo Tams	b. 1975	Canadian	Pop singer	G
Yen Tan	b. 1975	Malaysian-American	Filmmaker	G
Norma Tanega	1939–2019	American	Folk/pop singer	L
Jordan Tannahill	b. 1988	Canadian	Playwright, film, theatre director	G
Shingo Tano	b. 1979	Japanese	Comedian	G
Tristan Taormino	b. 1971	American	Author, columnist, film director	B
Edward Tarletski	b. 1974	Belarusian	Drag comedy musician, human rights activists	G
John Tartaglia	b. 1978	American	Puppeteer, actor	G
Drew Tarver	b. 1985	American	Actor, comedian	B
Juan de Tassis, 2nd Count of Villamediana	1582–1682	Spanish	Writer	B
Peter Tatchell	b. 1952	Australian-British	LGBT rights activist, politician	G
Diana Taurasi	b. 1982	American	Basketball player	L
Tayce	b. 1994	Welsh	Drag performer	G
Carolyn Taylor	b. ?	Canadian	Actor, comedian	L
Cecil Taylor	1929–2018	American	Jazz musician	G
Holland Taylor	b. 1943	American	Actor	L
Laurette Taylor	1884–1946	American	Actor	L
Paul Taylor	1930–2018	American	Dancer, choreographer	G
Penny Taylor	b. 1981	Australian	Basketball player	L
Rashad Taylor	b. 1981	American	Politician	G
Rip Taylor	1935–2019	American	Comedian, actor	G
Robert V. Taylor	b. 1959	South African	Clergy	G
Robin Lord Taylor	b. 1978	American	Actor	G
Valerie Taylor	1913–1997	American	Writer, poet, activist	L
Wesley Taylor	b. 1986	American	Stage actor, writer	G
Bex Taylor-Klaus	b. 1994	American	Actor	L
Modest Ilyich Tchaikovsky	1850–1916	Russian	Dramatist, librettist, translator	G
Pyotr Ilyich Tchaikovsky	1840–1893	Russian	Classical music composer	G
Pavel Tchelitchew	1898–1957	Russian	Artist	G
Michelle Tea	b. 1971	American	Writer, poet	L
Clare Teal	b. 1973	English	Jazz musician	L
Arjen Teeuwissen	b. 1971	Dutch	Equestrian	G
Judite Teixeira	1880–1959	Portuguese	Writer	L
Fernando Tejero	b. 1967	Spanish	Actor	G
Arlando Teller	b. ?	American	Politician	G
Hédi Temessy	1925–2001	Hungarian	Actor	L
Alice Temple	b. ?	English	Pop musician, BMX racer	L
Ösel Tendzin	1943–1990	American	Buddhist Lama	B
Neil Tennant	b. 1954	English	Pop musician (Pet Shop Boys)	G
Stephen Tennant	1906–1987	English	Aristocrat	G
Matthew Tennyson	b. 1989	English	Actor	G
Grigory Teplov	1717–1779	Russian	Academic administrator	G
J.T. Tepnapa	b. 1977	American	Writer, producer, actor, director	G
Matt Terry	b. 1993	English	Singer, songwriter	G
Hermann von Teschenberg	1866–1911	Austrian	Barrister, translator, LGBT rights activist	G
Mario Testino	b. 1954	Peruvian	Photographer	G
David Testo	b. 1981	American	Soccer player	G
Giovanni Testori	1923–1993	Italian	Writer, playwright, art historian, literary critic	G
Ina-Yoko Teutenberg	b. 1974	German	Racing cyclist	L
Mark Tewksbury	b. 1968	Canadian	Swimmer	G
Nik Thakkar	b. 1988	English	Multi-disciplinary artist	G
Sister Rosetta Tharpe	1915–1973	American	Gospel musician	B
Carole Thate	b. 1971	Dutch	Field hockey player	L
Maria Thattil	b. ?	Australian	Model, make-up artist, podcaster, activist, beauty pageant winner	B
Joe Thein	b. 1991	Luxembourgish	Politician	G
William Ware Theiss	1931–1992	American	Costume designer	G
William Thetford	1923–1988	American	Psychologist	G
Jean-Yves Thibaudet	b. 1961	French	Classical musician	G
Peter Thiel	b. 1967	American	Entrepreneur, venture capitalist	G
Olivia Thirlby	b. 1986	American	Actor	B
Jessica Thoennes	b. 1995	American	Rower	L
Alyssa Thomas	b. 1992	American	Basketball player	L
Gareth Thomas	b. 1974	Welsh	Rugby player	G
Josh Thomas	b. 1987	Australian	Comedian	G
Kristen Thomas	b. 1993	American	Rugby player	L
Mickalene Thomas	b. 1971	American	Painter	L
Owen Thomas	b. 1972	American	Blogger, website executive	G
R. Eric Thomas	b. 1982?	American	Writer	G
Russell Thomas	b. ?	American	Opera singer	G
Dunstan Thompson	1918–1975	American	Poet	G
Geraldine Morgan Thompson	1872–1967	American	Social reform pioneer	L
Scott Thompson	b. 1959	Canadian	Comedian	G
Tessa Thompson	b. 1983	American	Actor	B
Gordon Thomson	b. 1945	Canadian	Actor	G
Ross Thomson	b. 1987	Scottish	Politician	G
Virgil Thomson	1896–1989	American	Classical music composer	G
Tomas Thordarson	b. 1974	Danish-Icelandic	Pop singer	G
Markus Thormeyer	b. 1997	Canadian	Swimmer	G
Bella Thorne	b. 1997	American	Actor, singer	B
Tracy Thorne-Begland	b. 1966	American	Judge; 1st openly gay jurist elected by the Virginia General Assembly	G
Ian Thorpe	b. 1982	Australian	Swimmer	G
David Thorstad	1941–2021	American	Activist, historian	B
Brad Thorson	b. 1987	American	Football player, rugby player	G
Ingrid Thunem	b. 1989	Norwegian	Paralympic swimmer	L
Wallace Thurman	1902–1934	American	Writer	G
Tianqi Emperor	1605–1627	Chinese	Emperor of China	B
Elliot Tiber	b. 1935	American	Writer	G
Tiberius	42 BC–37 AD	Roman	Emperor	B
Jacob Tierney	b. 1979	Canadian	Actor, director	G
Tatiana de la Tierra	1961–2012	Colombian-American	Writer	L
John Tiffany	b. 1971	English	Theatre director	G
Kari S. Tikka	1944–2006	Finnish	Legal scholar	G
Bill Tilden	1893–1953	American	Athlete	G
Linda Tillery	b. 1948	American	Singer, percussionist	L
Tramell Tillman	b. 1985	American	Actor	G
Wolfgang Tillmans	b. 1968	German	Artist	G
Michael Tilson Thomas	b. 1944	American	Classical conductor, composer and musician	G
Agnaldo Timóteo	1936–2021	Brazilian	Singer, politician	G
Tinashe	b. 1993	American	Singer-songwriter	B
Wayne Ting	b. ?	American	Entrepreneur, investor, business executive	G
Ted Tinling	1910–1990	English	Athlete, fashion designer	G
James Tinney	1942–1988	American	Christian minister, historian, professor of journalism	G
Gary Tinterow	b. 1953	American	Art historian, curator	G
Vladimir Tintor	b. 1978	Serbian	Actor	G
Michael Tippett	1905–1998	English	Composer	G
Richard Tisei	b. 1962	American	Politician	G
Matthew Titone	b. 1961	American	Politician, lawyer	G
Herman Tjeenk Willink	b. 1942	Dutch	Politician	G
Tomas Tobé	b. 1978	Swedish	Politician	G
Ronnie Tober	b. 1945	Dutch	Pop musician	G
Mark Tobey	1890–1976	American	Abstract expressionist painter	G
Andrew Tobias	b. 1947	American	Journalist, writer	G
Herbert Tobias	1924–1982	German	Photographer	G
Evan Todd	b. 1989	American	Actor, producer	G
Margaret Todd	1859–1918	Scottish	Physician	L
Patricia Todd	b. 1955	American	Politician	L
Tô Hoài	1920–2014	Vietnamese	Writer	G
Colm Tóibín	b. 1955	Irish	Writer	G
Jani Toivola	b. 1977	Finnish	Actor, dancer, politician	G
Sandi Toksvig	b. 1958	Danish-British	TV and radio personality	L
Will Toledo	b. 1992	American	Singer-songwriter (Car Seat Headrest)	G
Clyde Tolson	1900–1975	American	Associate Director of the FBI	G
Henryk Tomaszewski	1919–2001	Polish	Mime	G
Alejandro Tommasi	b. 1957	Mexican	Actor	G
Ellen Tomek	b. 1984	American	Rower	L
Jesús Tomillero	b. 1994	Spanish	Football referee	G
Lily Tomlin	b. 1939	American	Actor, comedian	L
Maurice Tomlinson	b. 1971	Jamaican	Attorney, law lecturer, LGBT and HIV activist	G
Mel Tomlinson	1954–2019	American	Ballet dancer	G
Taylor Tomlinson	b. 1993	American	Comedian	B
Pier Vittorio Tondelli	1955–1991	Italian	Writer	G
Karen Tongson	b. 1973	American	Cultural critic, writer, queer studies scholar	L
Bruno Tonioli	b. 1955	Italian-English	Dancer, choreographer	G
Philip Toone	b. 1965	Canadian	Politician	G
Soxie Topacio	1952–2017	Filipino	Actor, director, comedian	G
Jools & Lynda Topp	b. 1958	New Zealand	Pop musicians	L
Luisita Lopez Torregrosa	b. 1943	Puerto Rican	Journalist, memoirist	L
Art Torres	b. 1946	American	Politician	G
Julio Torres	b. 1987	Salvadoran	Writer, comedian	G
Justin Torres	b. 1980	American	Novelist	G
Ritchie Torres	b. 1988	American	Politician; 1st openly gay candidate to be elected to legislative office in The Bronx	G
Carmen Tórtola Valencia	1882–1955	Spanish	Dancer	L
Nico Tortorella	b. 1988	American	Actor, model	B
Peterson Toscano	b. 1965	American	Playwright, actor, LGBT rights activist	G
Vaughn Toulouse	1959–1991	Jersey-English	Singer (Department S)	G
Noel Tovey	b. 1934	Australian	Dancer, choreographer, actor	G
Russell Tovey	b. 1981	English	Actor	G
Andy Towle	b. 1967	American	Journalist, blogger	G
Prescott Townsend	1894–1973	American	Activist	G
Susannah Townsend	b. 1989	English	Field hockey player	L
Sylvia Townsend Warner	1893–1978	English	Writer	B
Pete Townshend	b. 1945	English	Musician, singer-songwriter (The Who)	B
Jim Toy	1930–2022	American	LGBT rights activist	G
Robert Tracy	1955–2007	American	Dancer, writer, educator, activist	G
Trajan	53–117 AD	Roman	Soldier, emperor	G
Jeffrey Trail	1969–1997	American	Military	G
Jeff Trandahl	b. 1964	American	Politician	G
Justin Tranter	b. 1980	American	Musician, songwriter, activist	G
Stephen Trask	b. 1967	American	Rock musician, film composer	G
P.L. Travers	1899–1996	Australian-British	Novelist, actor, journalist	B
Philip Treacy	b. 1967	Irish	Milliner	G
Ronald Tree	1897–1976	English	Politician	G
Violet Trefusis	1894–1972	English	Writer	L
Lucie Blue Tremblay	b. 1958	Canadian	Folk-rock musician	L
Michel Tremblay	b. 1942	Canadian	Writer, playwright	G
Roland Michel Tremblay	b. 1972	Canadian	Writer	G
Bobby Trendy	b. 1981	American	Interior decorator, TV personality	G
Charles Trenet	1913–2001	French	Singer	G
Taylor Trensch	b. 1989	American	Actor	G
Djuan Trent	b. 1986	American	YouTube personality, former beauty pageant titleholder	L
Arthur Tress	b. 1940	American	Photographer	G
Anette Trettebergstuen	b. 1981	Norwegian	Politician	L
Monika Treut	b. 1954	German	Filmmaker	L
João Silvério Trevisan	b. 1944	Brazilian	Writer	G
Patrick Trevor-Roper	1916–2004	English	Doctor, LGBT rights activist	G
Mark Trevorrow	b. 1959	Australian	Comedian	G
Tony Tripoli	b. 1969	American	Actor	G
Rose Troche	b. 1964	American	Filmmaker	L
Walter Tróchez	1982–2009	Honduran	LGBT rights advocate	G
Zdeněk Troška	b. 1953	Czech	Film director	G
Rembert S. Truluck	1934–2008	American	Clergy	G
Mary L. Trump	b. 1965	American	Psychologist, businessperson, author, niece of Donald Trump	L
Tom Tryon	1926–1991	American	Actor, writer	G
Kevin Tsai	b. 1962	Taiwanese	TV host, writer	G
Tsai Ming-liang	b. 1957	Malaysian-Taiwanese	Film director	G
Daniel C. Tsang	b. ?	American	Activist, scholar	G
Yannis Tsarouchis	1910–1989	Greek	Artist	G
Tseng Kwong Chi (a.k.a. Joseph Tseng)	1950–1990	American	Photographer	G
Christos Tsiolkas	b. 1965	Australian	Writer	G
Olga Tsuberbiller	1885–1975	Russian	Mathematician	L
Kitty Tsui	b. 1952	American	Author, poet, actor, bodybuilder	L
Sam Tsui	b. 1989	American	Singer, YouTube personality	G
Marina Tsvetaeva	1892–1941	Russian	Poet, writer	B
Irene Tu	b. 1992	American	Comedian, actor, writer	L
Torvald Tu	1893–1955	Norwegian	Poet, playwright, novelist	G
Esera Tuaolo	b. 1968	American	Football player	G
Yi-Fu Tuan	1930–2022	Chinese-American	Geographer	G
Corin Tucker	b. 1972	American	Rock musician (Heavens to Betsy, Sleater-Kinney)	B
Antony Tudor	1908–1987	English	Dancer, choreographer	G
Ruby Tui	b. 1991	New Zealand	Rugby sevens player	L
Henry Scott Tuke	1858–1929	English	Painter, photographer	G
Mikhail Tumasov	b. ?	Russian	LGBT rights activist	G
Francis Tumblety	1833–1903	Irish–American	Medical charlatan	G
Tommy Tune	b. 1939	American	Actor, dancer, choreographer, theater director	G
Thomas M. Tunney	b. 1955	American	Entrepreneur, politician	G
Katie Tupper	b. ?	Canadian	Singer-songwriter	B
Alan Turing	1912–1954	English	Mathematician, cryptographer	G
Colin Turnbull	1924–1994	American	Anthropologist	G
Guinevere Turner	b. 1968	American	Actor, writer	L
Hans Heinrich von Twardowski	1898–1958	German	Actor	G
Emma Twigg	b. 1987	New Zealand	Rower	L
Stephen Twigg	b. 1966	English	Politician	G
Cy Twombly	1928–2011	American	Painter	B
Robin Tyler	b. 1942	Canadian-American	Comedian	L
James Tynion IV	b. 1987	American	Comic book writer	B
Oras Tynkkynen	b. 1977	Finnish	Politician	G
Sebastian Tynkkynen	b. 1989	Finnish	Politician	G

A · Ba–Bh · Bi–Bz · C · D · E · F · G · H · I · J · K · L · M · N · O
P · Q · R · Sa–Sc · Sd–Si · Sj–Sz · T · U · V · W · X · Y · Z

== U ==
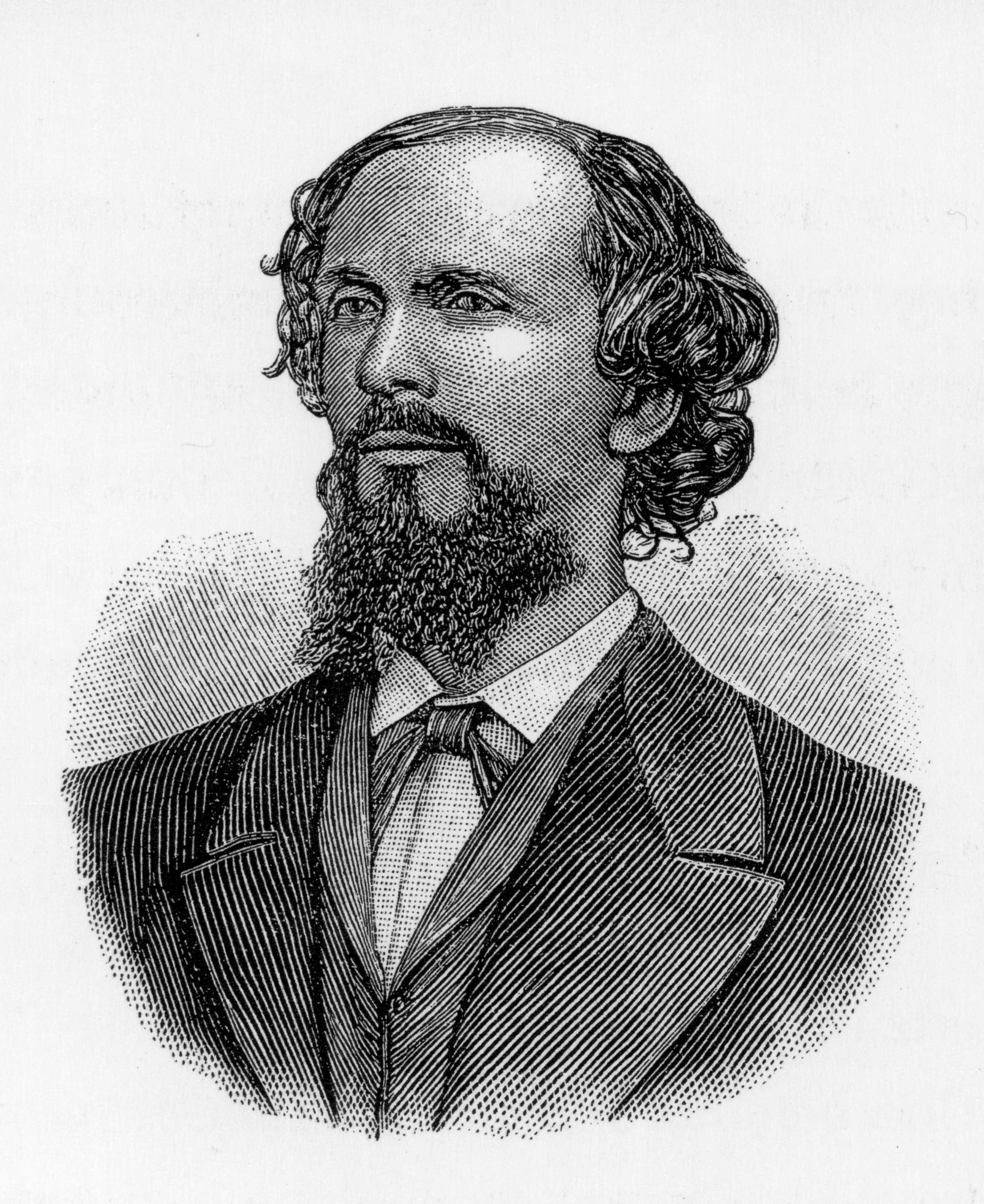
Writer and social activist Karl Heinrich Ulrichs

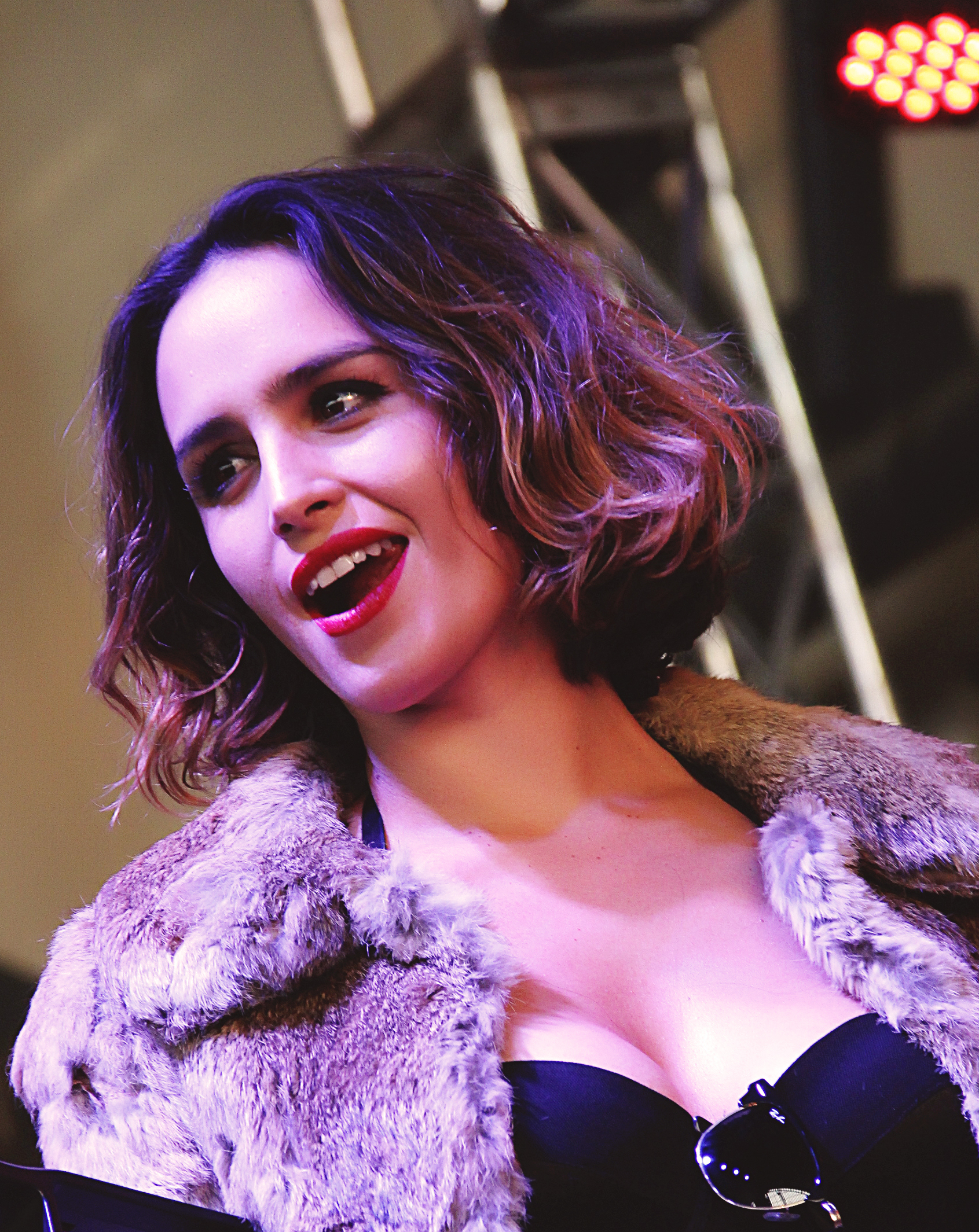
Actress Fernanda Urrejola

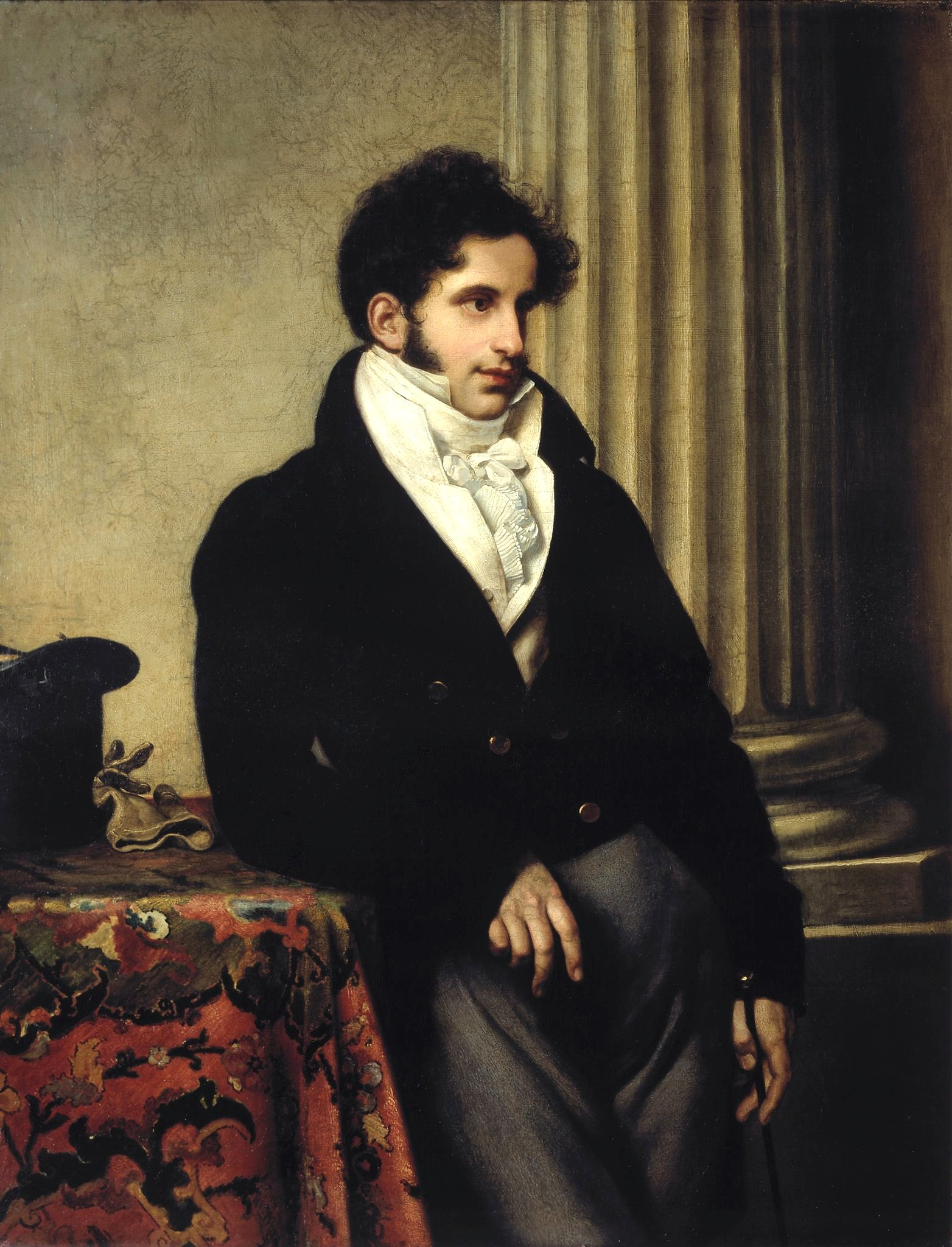
Statesman and scholar Sergey Uvarov

Name	Lifetime	Nationality	Notable as	Notes
Kali Uchis	b. 1994	American	Singer	B
Gal Uchovsky	b. 1958	Israeli	Screenwriter, producer, journalist, activist, TV personality	G
Nicholas Udall	1504–1556	English	Playwright, schoolmaster	G
Georg Uecker	b. 1962	German	Actor	G
Wilhelm Uhde	1874–1947	German	Art historian	G
Neda Ulaby	b. circa. 1970	American	Reporter	L
Jessie Ulibarri	b. ?	American	Politician	G
Karl Heinrich Ulrichs	1825–1895	German	Lawyer, jurist, journalist, writer, pioneer of sexology and the modern gay rights movement	G
Ahmed Umar	b. 1988	Sudanese-Norwegian	Artist	G
Luz María Umpierre	b. 1947	Puerto Rican	Poet, scholar, human rights activist	L
Colton Underwood	b. 1992	American	TV personality, football player	G
Katie Underwood	b. 1975	Australian	Pop singer (Bardot)	B
Klára Ungár	b. 1958	Hungarian	Politician	L
Tyrone Unsworth	2003–2016	Australian	Youth who committed suicide due to anti-gay bullying	G
Jorma Uotinen	b. 1950	Finnish	Dancer, singer, choreographer	B
Dave Upthegrove	b. 1971	American	Politician	G
Enoé Uranga	b. 1963	Mexican	Politician; 1st openly lesbian member of the state legislature	L
Brandon Uranowitz	b. 1986	American	Actor	G
Marcus Urban	b. 1971	German	Footballer; Diversity adviser and campaigner	G
Alejandro Urdapilleta	1954–2013	Uruguayan	Actor	G
Torbjørn Urfjell	b. 1977	Norwegian	Politician	G
Carlos Uriarte	b. 1979	American	Lawyer, United States Assistant Attorney General	G
Brendon Urie	b. 1987	American	Singer, songwriter, musician (Panic! at the Disco)	B
Michael Urie	b. 1980	American	Actor	G
Fred Urquhart	1912–1995	Scottish	Writer	G
Fernanda Urrejola	b. 1981	Chilean	Actor	B
Anissa Urtez	b. 1995	American	Softball player, coach	L
Justin Utley	b. ?	American	Singer-songwriter	G
Sergey Uvarov	1786–1855	Russian	Statesman, scholar, Minister of National Education	G
David Uzochukwu	b. 1998	Austrian-Nigerian	Photographer	G

A · Ba–Bh · Bi–Bz · C · D · E · F · G · H · I · J · K · L · M · N · O
P · Q · R · Sa–Sc · Sd–Si · Sj–Sz · T · U · V · W · X · Y · Z

== V ==
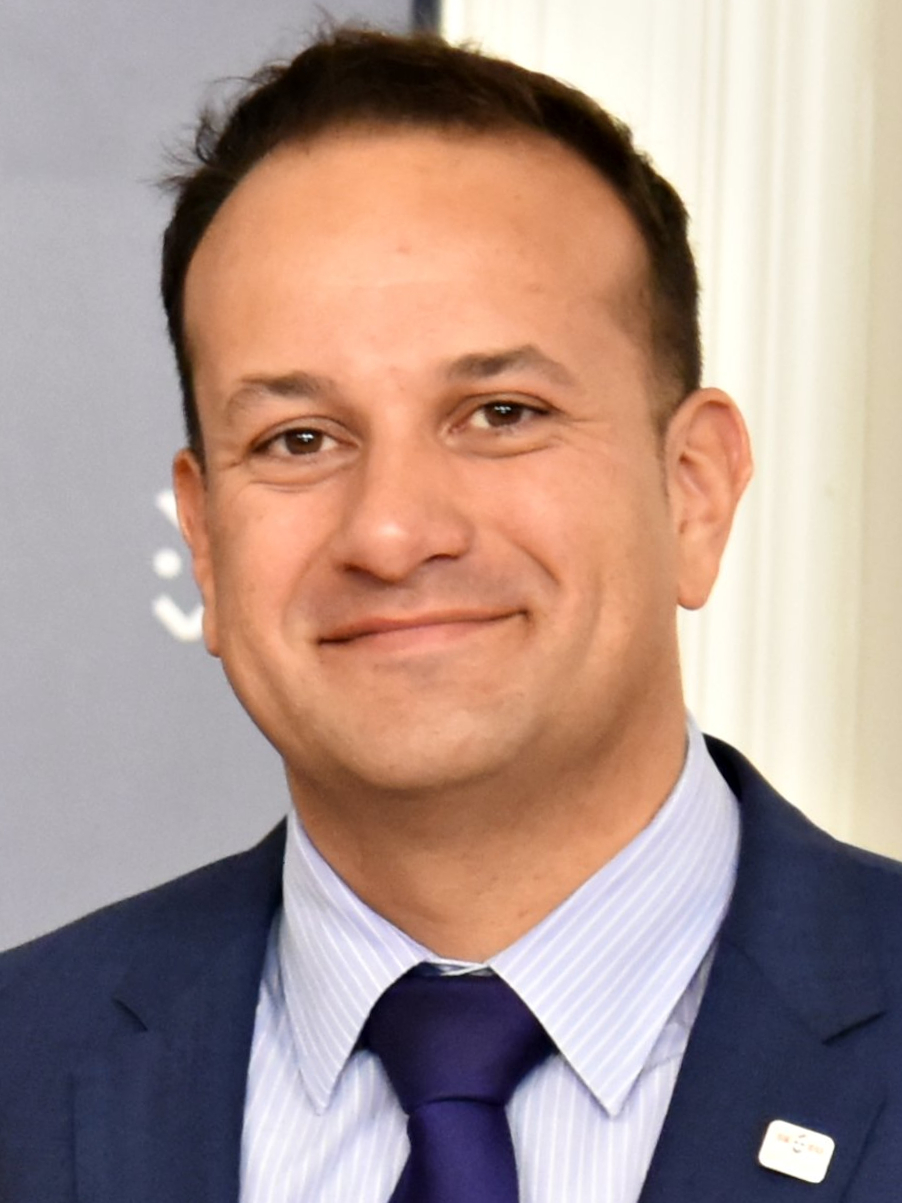
Taoiseach of Ireland Leo Varadkar

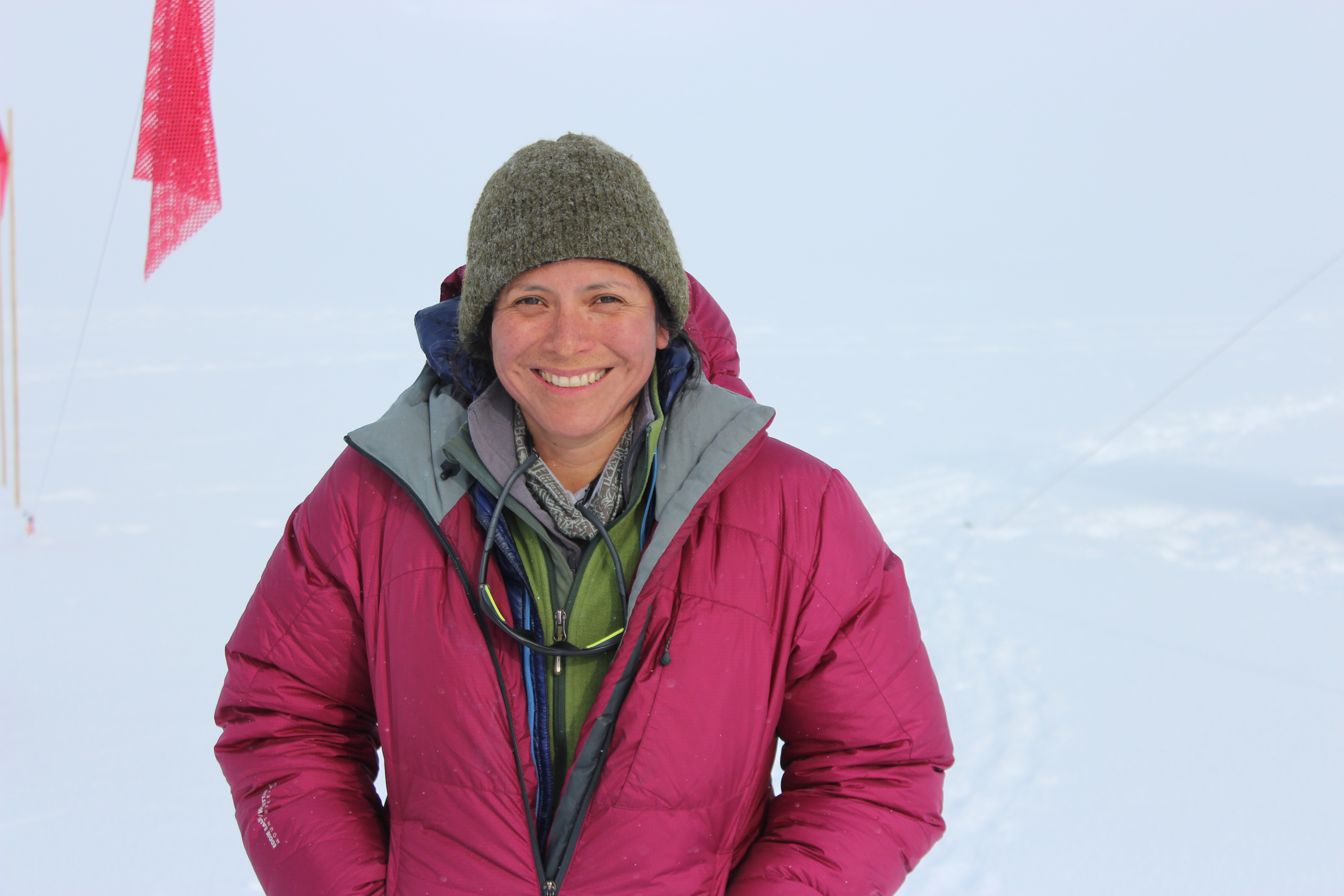
Mountaineer Silvia Vasquez-Lavado

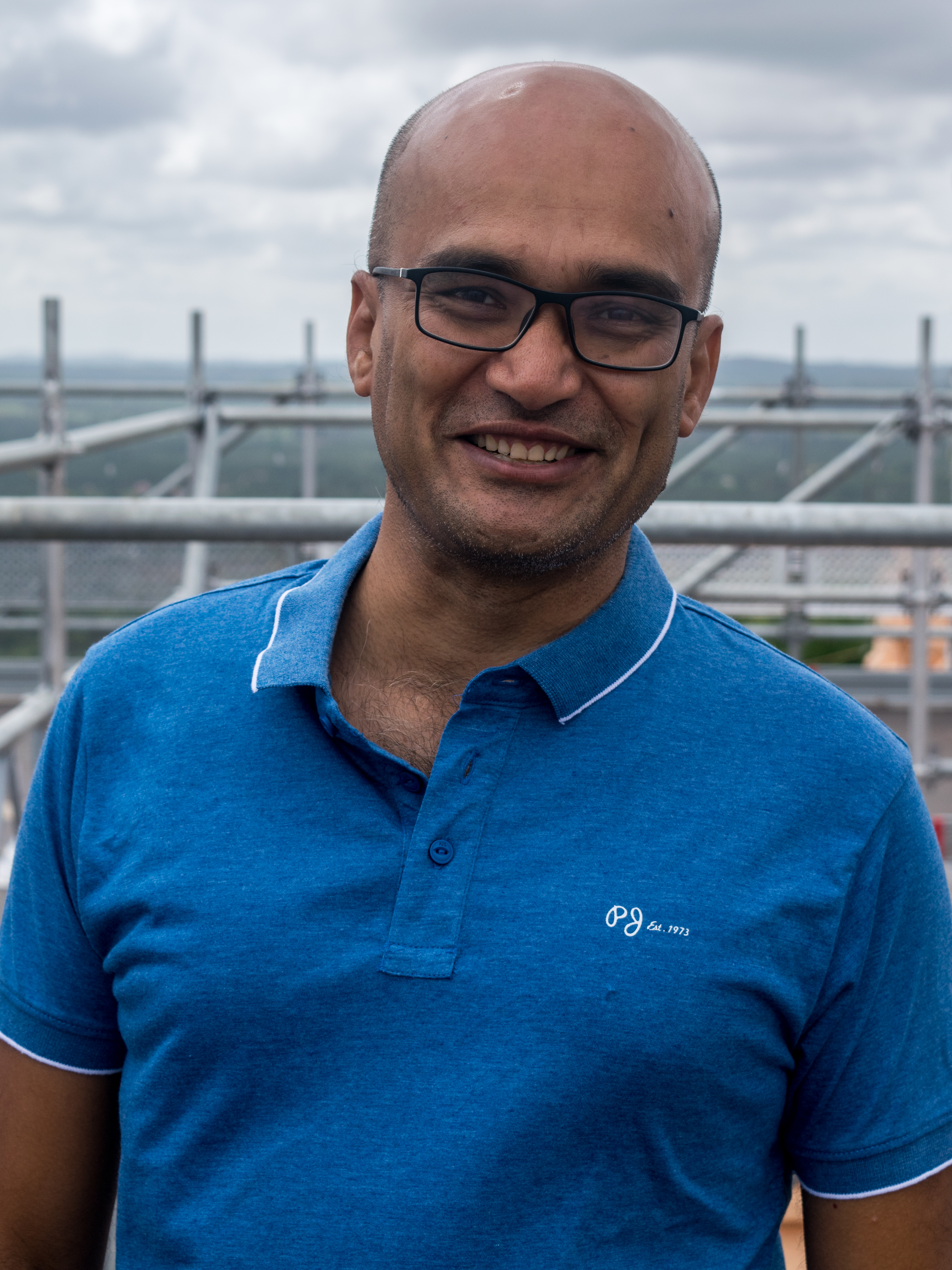
Writer Vasudhendra

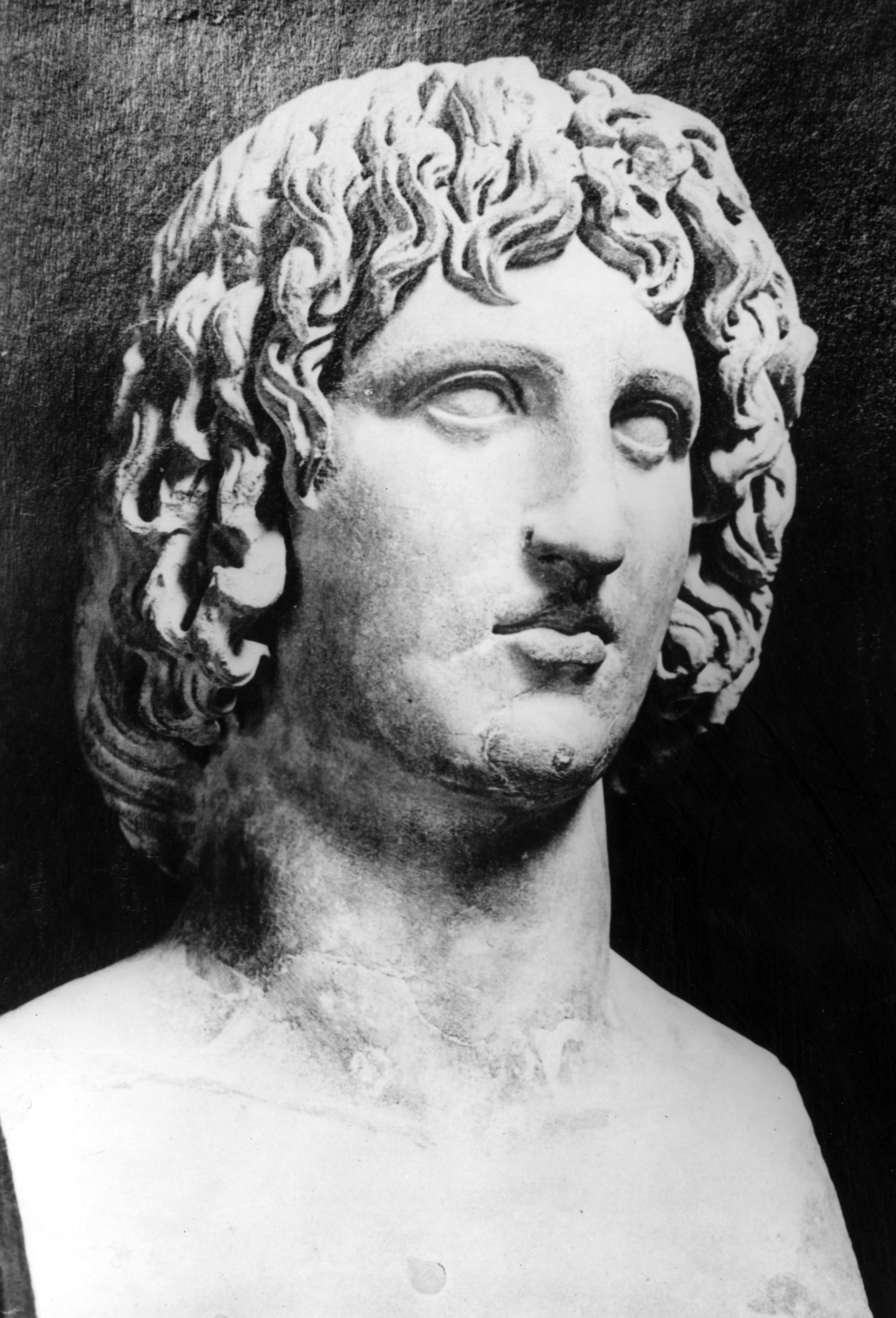
Poet Vergil

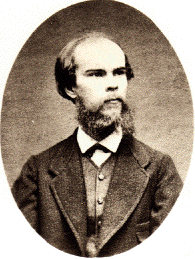
Poet Paul Verlaine

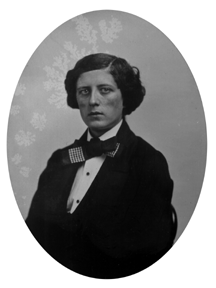
Opera singer and actress Felicita Vestvali

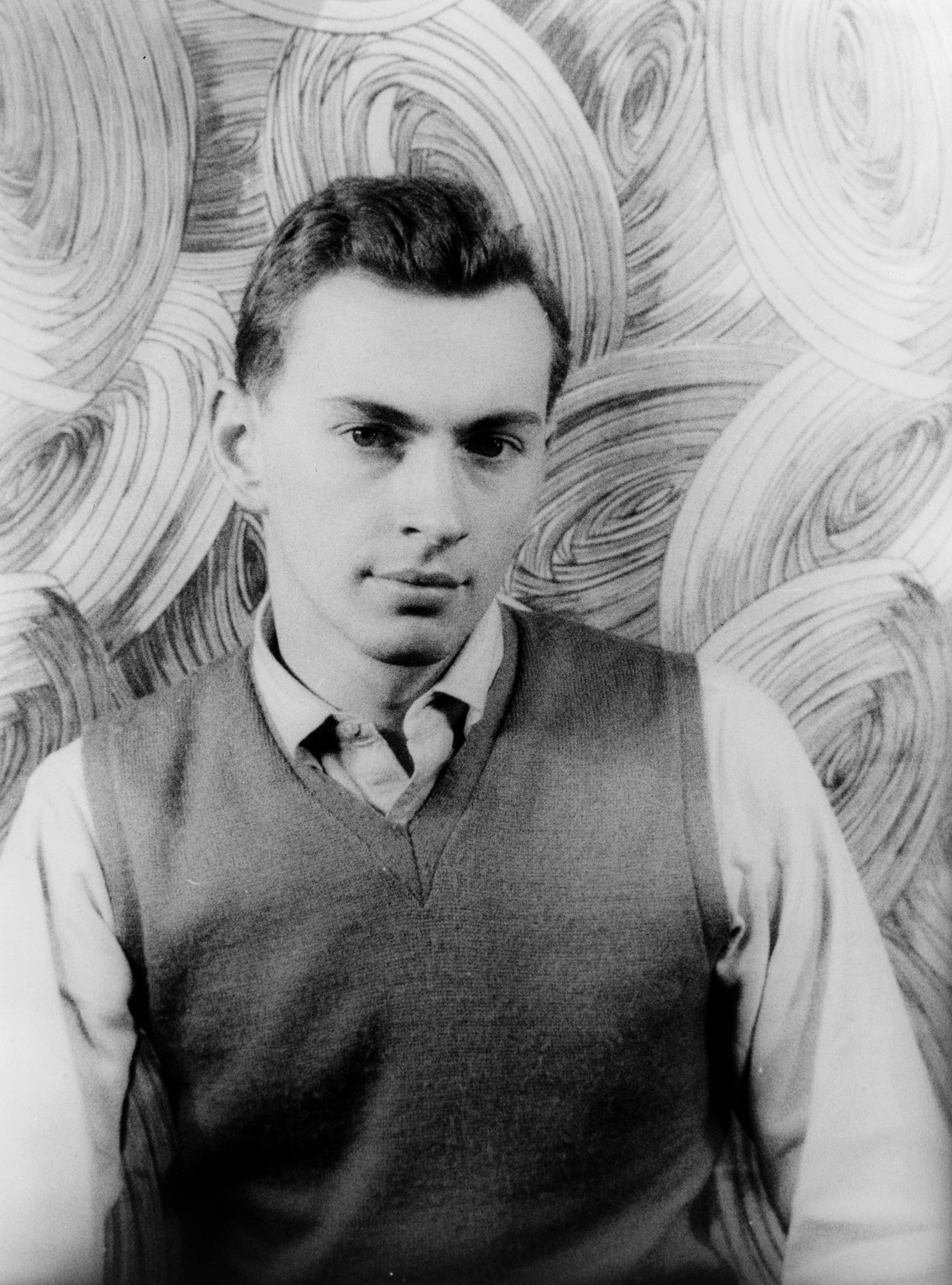
Author Gore Vidal

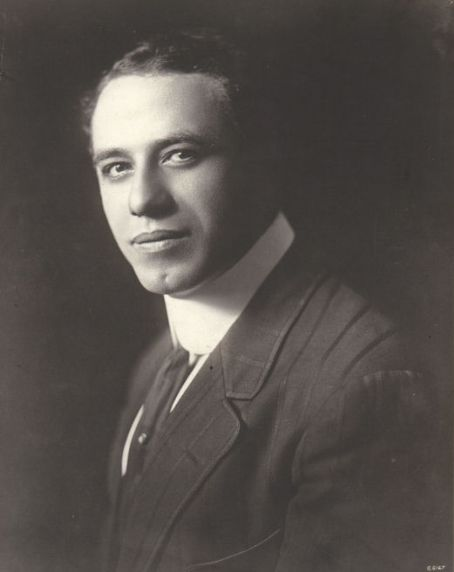
Actor and film director Robert G. Vignola

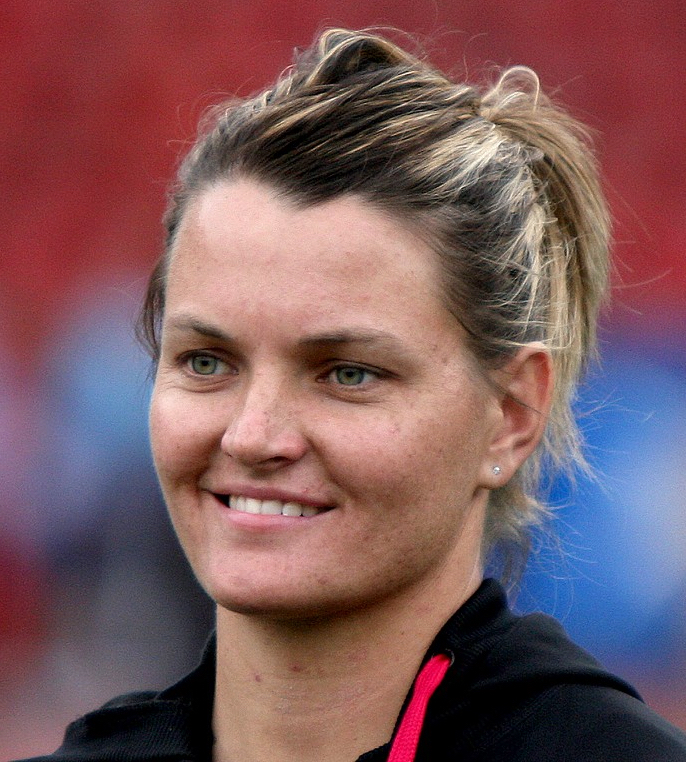
Cricketer and track and field athlete Sunette Viljoen

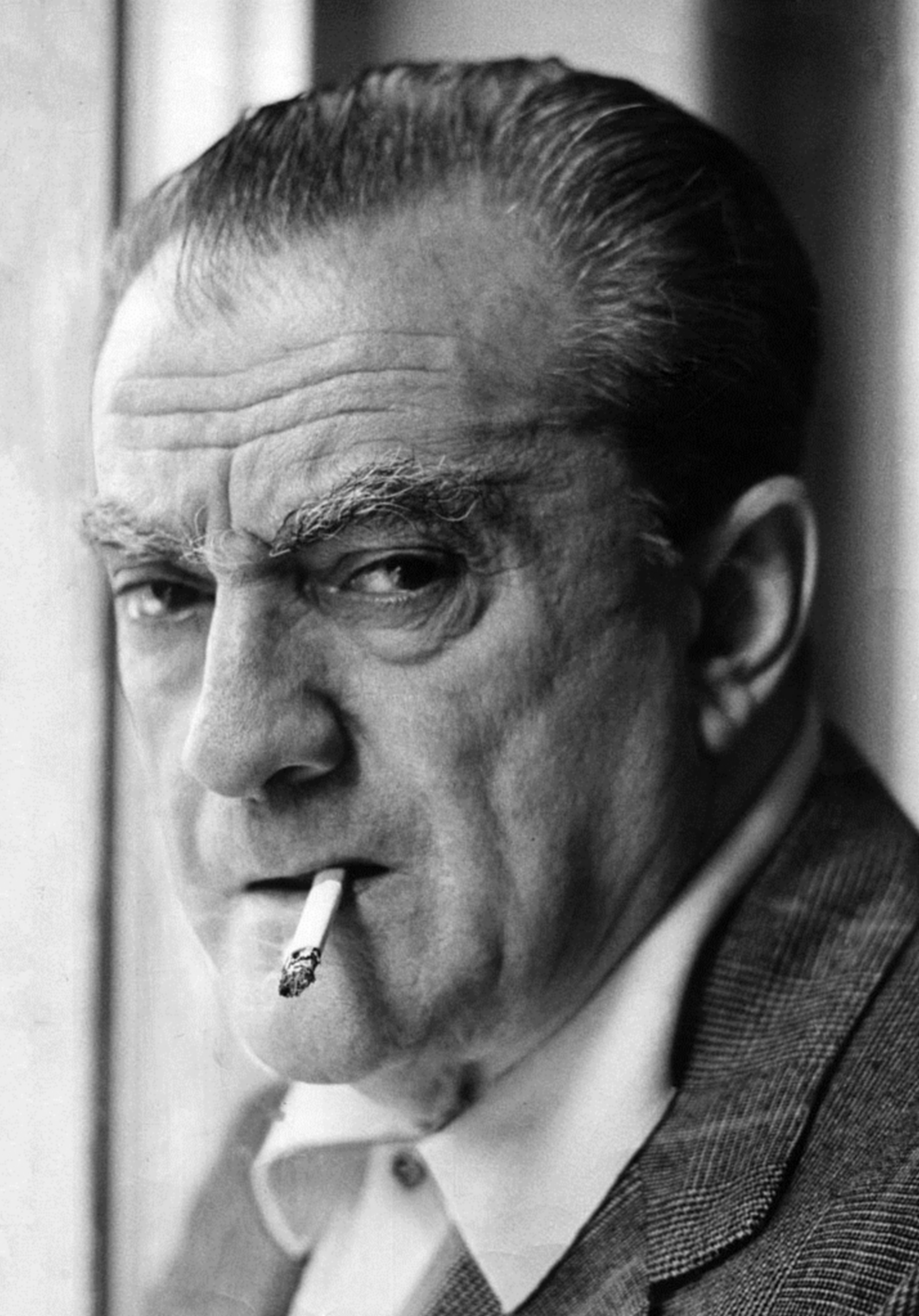
Filmmaker Luchino Visconti

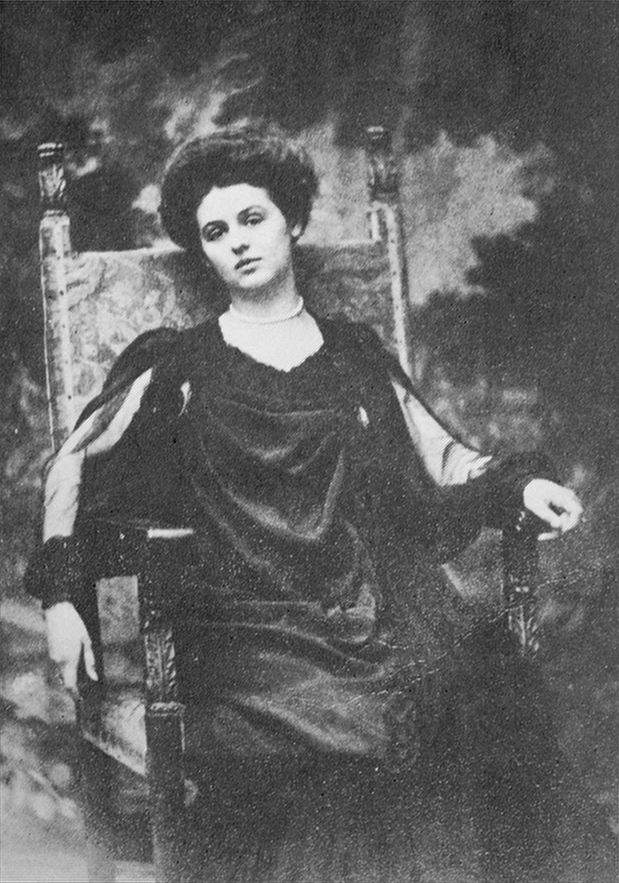
Poet Renée Vivien

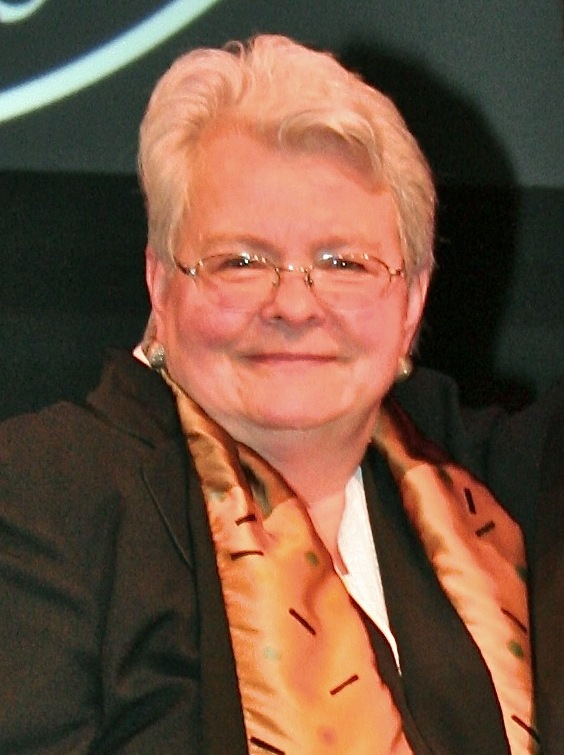
Playwright Paula Vogel

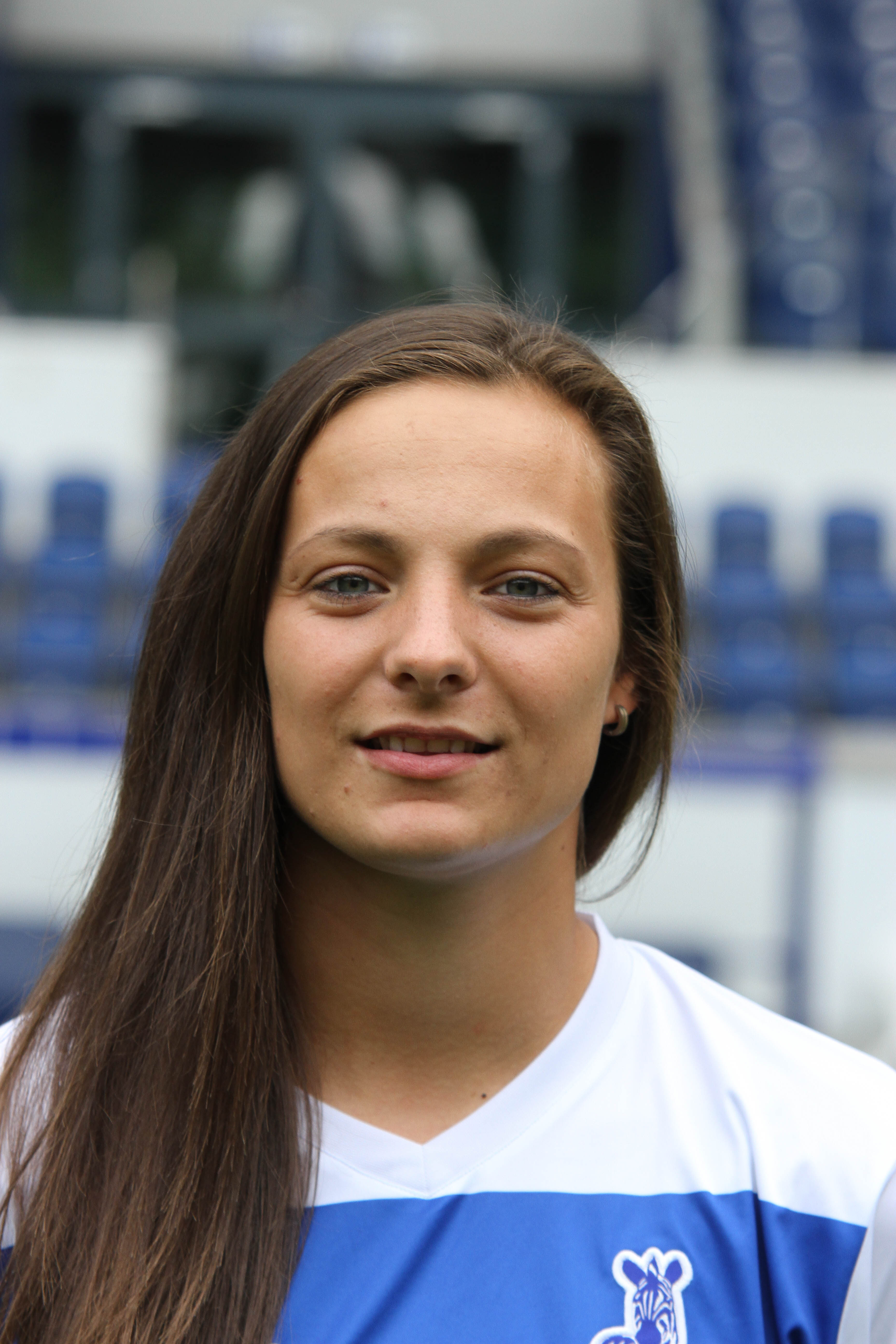
Footballer Lucie Voňková

Poet Ocean Vuong

Name	Lifetime	Nationality	Notable as	Notes
Valentin Vaala	1909–1976	Finnish	Film director, screenwriter, editor	G
James Vacca	b. 1955	American	Politician	G
Christine Vachon	b. 1962	American	Film producer	L
Brian Vahaly	b. 1979	American	Tennis player	G
Urvashi Vaid	1958–2022	Indian-American	LGBT rights activist, lawyer	L
Sarah Vaillancourt	b. 1985	Canadian	Ice hockey player	L
Hannu Väisänen	b. 1951	Finnish	Artist, writer	G
Vajiravudh	1881–1925	Thai	King of Siam	G
José de Meneses da Silveira e Castro, 2nd Marquis of Valada	1826–1895	Portuguese	Noble, politician	G
Alisa Valdes	b. 1969	American	Author, journalist, producer	B
Lupe Valdez	b. 1947	American	Sheriff	L
José Ignacio Valenzuela	b. 1972	Chilean	Writer, screenwriter	G
Max Valiquette	b. 1973	Canadian	Pop culture expert, TV personality	G
Nils-Aslak Valkeapää	1943–2001	Finnish-Sámi	Writer, musician, artist	G
Fernando Vallejo	b. 1942	Colombian-Mexican	Author, filmmaker	G
Linda Valli	b.?	American	Educator and academic	
Pierre Vallières	1938–1998	Canadian	Journalist, writer	G
Philippe Vallois	b. 1948	French	Filmmaker	G
Arnaud Valois	b. 1984	French	Actor	G
Louis Van Amstel	b. 1972	Dutch-American	Dancer, choreographer	G
Danitra Vance	1954–1994	American	Comedian, actor	L
Courtney Vandersloot	b. 1989	American	Basketball player	L
John Van Druten	1901–1957	English	Actor, playwright	G
Elke Vanhoof	b. 1991	Belgian	BMX rider	L
Jonathan Van Ness	b. 1987	American	Hairdresser, podcaster, TV personality	G
Gus Van Sant	b. 1952	American	Film director, photographer, musician	G
Alison Van Uytvanck	b. 1994	Belgian	Tennis player	L
Carl Van Vechten	1880–1964	American	Writer, photographer	G
Tim Van Zandt	b. 1963	American	Politician, nurse, accountant	G
Arthur H. Vandenberg Jr.	1907–1968	American	government official, politician	G
Luther Vandross	1951–2005	American	Singer, songwriter, record producer	G
Trent Vanegas	b. 1975	American	Blogger	G
Kirsten Vangsness	b. 1972	American	Actor, writer	B
Ruth Vanita	b. 1955	Indian	Academic, activist	L
Cherry Vann	b. 1958	English	Bishop of Monmouth	L
Joanne Vannicola	b. 1968	Canadian	Actor	L
Robert Vano	b. 1948	Slovak	Photographer	G
Leo Varadkar	b. 1979	Irish	Tánaiste, Taoiseach of Ireland	G
Chavela Vargas	1919–2012	Mexican	Singer	L
Jose Antonio Vargas	b. 1981	Filipino-American	Journalist	G
António Variações	1944–1984	Portuguese	Pop musician	G
Jeff Varner	b. 1966	American	Real estate agent, reality show contestant	G
Vibeke Vasbo	b. 1944	Danish	Writer, activist	L
Laura Vasilescu	b. 1984	Romanian	Handballer	L
Junior Vasquez	b. 1946	American	DJ, musician	G
Silvia Vasquez-Lavado	b. 1974	Peruvian-American	Explorer, mountaineer, social entrepreneur, technologist and first openly gay woman to complete the Seven Summits	L
John Vassall	1924–1996	English	Civil servant, spy	G
Vasudhendra	b. 1969	Indian	Author	G
Gianni Vattimo	1936–2023	Italian	Politician, writer, philosopher	G
Jaymes Vaughan	b. 1983	American	TV personality	G
Keith Vaughan	1912–1977	English	Painter	G
R. M. Vaughan	b. 1965	Canadian	Poet, writer	G
Ron Vawter	1948–1994	American	Actor	G
Carmen Vázquez	1949–2021	Puerto Rican	Activist, writer	L
Jesús Vázquez	b. 1965	Spanish	TV presenter	G
Jorge Javier Vázquez	b. 1970	Spanish	TV presenter, writer, actor	G
Dan Veatch	b. 1965	American	Swimmer	G
Elihu Vedder	1836–1923	American	Painter, illustrator	G
Nina Vedeneyeva	1882–1955	Russian	Physicist	L
Anne Veenendaal	b. 1995	Dutch	Field hockey player	L
Tanel Veenre	b. 1977	Estonian	Jewelry artist, designer	G
Sebastián Vega	b. 1988	Argentine	Basketball player	G
Jennifer Veiga	b. 1962	American	Politician	L
Werner Veigel	1928–1995	German	News presenter	G
Chloe Veitch	b. 1999	English	Model, media personality	B
José de Meneses da Silveira e Castro, 2nd Marquis of Valada	1826–1895	Portuguese	Nobleman, politician	G
Henri Velandia	b. 1983	Venezuelan	Dancer	G
Patricia Velásquez	b. 1971	Venezuelan	Actor, model	B
Gerardo Velazquez	1958–1992	American	Punk rock musician (Nervous Gender)	G
Ivan Velez Jr.	b. 1961	American	Writer, illustrator, cartoonist	G
Jane Velez-Mitchell	b. 1956	American	TV journalist	L
Glen Vella	b. 1983	Maltese	Singer	G
Maurice Vellekoop	b. 1964	Canadian	Illustrator, comics artist	G
Caetano Veloso	b. 1942	Brazilian	Composer, singer	B
Nichi Vendola	b. 1958	Italian	Politician	G
Anthony Venn-Brown	b. 1951	Australian	Author, former evangelist	G
Julian Venonsky	b. 1993	American	Rower	G
Dan Vera	b. ?	American	Poet	G
Johann Vera	b. 1995	Ecuadorian	Singer, actor	B
Gerda Verburg	b. 1957	Dutch	Politician	L
Fulco di Verdura	1898–1978	Italian	Jeweller	G
Vergil	70-19 BC	Roman	Poet	G
Paul Verlaine	1844–1896	French	Poet	B
Rob Verlinden	b. 1950	Dutch	TV personality	G
Reg Vermue	b. ?	Canadian	Rock musician	G
Jim Verraros	b. 1983	American	Pop musician, reality TV show contestant	G
Nick Verreos	b. 1967	American	Fashion designer	G
Gianni Versace	1946–1997	Italian	Fashion designer	G
Mike Verschuur	b. 1987	Dutch	Racing driver	G
Johan Verstreken	b. 1964	Belgian	TV presenter, politician	G
Börje Vestlund	b. 1960	Swedish	Politician	G
Felicita Vestvali	1831–1880	German	Opera singer, actor	L
Théophile de Viau	1590–1626	French	Poet, dramatist	G
Vice Ganda	b. 1976	Filipino	Comedian, TV presenter, actor, singer	G
Gore Vidal	1925–2012	American	Writer, actor	B
Kevin Vidal	b. ?	Canadian	Comedian, actor	B
Paco Vidarte	1970–2008	Spanish	Writer, LGBT rights activist	G
Lena Videkull	b. 1962	Swedish	Footballer	L
Mário Viegas	1948–1996	Portuguese	Actor, theatre director, narrator	G
Salka Viertel	1889–1978	Ukrainian-American	Actor, screenwriter	L
Filipp Vigel	1786–1856	Russian	Diplomat, memoirist	G
Robert G. Vignola	1882–1953	Italian-American	Actor, film director, screenwriter	G
Archduke Ludwig Viktor of Austria	1842–1919	Austrian	Nobleman	G
Bruce Vilanch	b. 1948	American	Comedy writer, actor	G
Hervé Vilard	b. 1946	French	Pop singer	G
Sunette Viljoen	b. 1983	South African	Cricketer, track and field athlete	L
Horacio Villalobos	b. 1970	Mexican	TV host, actor	G
Elyse Villani	b. 1989	Australia	Cricketer	L
Tom Villard	1953–1994	American	Actor	G
Agustí Villaronga	1953–2023	Spanish	Director	G
Linda Villarosa	b. 1959	American	Author, journalist	L
José Villarrubia	b. 1961	American	Artist	G
Xavier Villaurrutia	1903–1950	Mexican	Poet, playwright	G
Jason Villegas	b. 1977	American	Artist	G
George Villiers, 1st Duke of Buckingham	1592–1628	English	Politician	G
Linda Villumsen	b. 1985	Danish-New Zealand	Road racing cyclist	L
Diego Viñales	b. circa 1946/1947–1970	Argentine	Student who died during a police raid in a New York gay bar	G
Norah Vincent	1968–2022	American	Journalist	L
Lilli Vincenz	1937–2023	American	Gay rights activist	L
Vincint	b. ?	American	Pop singer	G
Una Vincenzo, Lady Troubridge	1887–1963	British	Sculptor. translator	L
Donald Vining	1917–1998	American	Writer	G
Luchino Visconti	1906–1976	Italian	Filmmaker	G
Pavel Vítek	b. 1962	Czech	Pop musician, actor	G
Ólína Guðbjörg Viðarsdóttir	b. 1982	Icelandic	Footballer	L
Pabllo Vittar	b. 1994	Brazilian	Singer-songwriter, drag queen	G
Renée Vivien	1877–1909	English	Poet	L
Claude Vivier	1948–1983	Canadian	Composer	G
Lisa-Marie Vizaniari	b. 1971	Australian	Discus thrower, boxer	L
Danh Võ	b. 1975	Vietnamese-Danish	Artist	G
Anna Vock	1885–1962	Swiss	Journalist, gay rights activist	L
Bruce Voeller	1934–1994	American	Biologist, HIV/AIDS researcher	G
Bruno Vogel	1898–1987	German	Writer, social activist, pacifist	G
Joe Vogel	b. 1997	Uruguayan-American	Politician	G
Paula Vogel	b. 1951	American	Playwright	L
Paul C. Vogt	b. 1964	American	Actor, comedian	G
Julia Volkova	b. 1985	Russian	Pop singer (t.A.T.u.)	B
Lucie Voňková	b. 1992	Czech	Footballer	L
Hein Vos	1903–1972	Dutch	Politician	G
Pierre de Vos	b. 1963	South African	Constitutional law scholar	G
Daniel Vosovic	b. 1981	American	Fashion designer	G
Philip Voss	1936–2020	English	Actor	G
Barbora Votíková	b. 1996	Czech	Footballer	L
Božo Vrećo	b. 1983	Bosnian	Singer, musician	G
Delwin Vriend	b. 1966	Canadian	LGBT rights activist	G
Vũ Cát Tường	b. 1992	Vietnamese	Singer-songwriter	L
Tatomir Vukanović	1907–1997	Serbian	Ethnologist	G
Ocean Vuong	b. 1988	American	Writer	G

== See also ==
- List of gay, lesbian or bisexual people
