= Valiquette =

Given name of French origin)

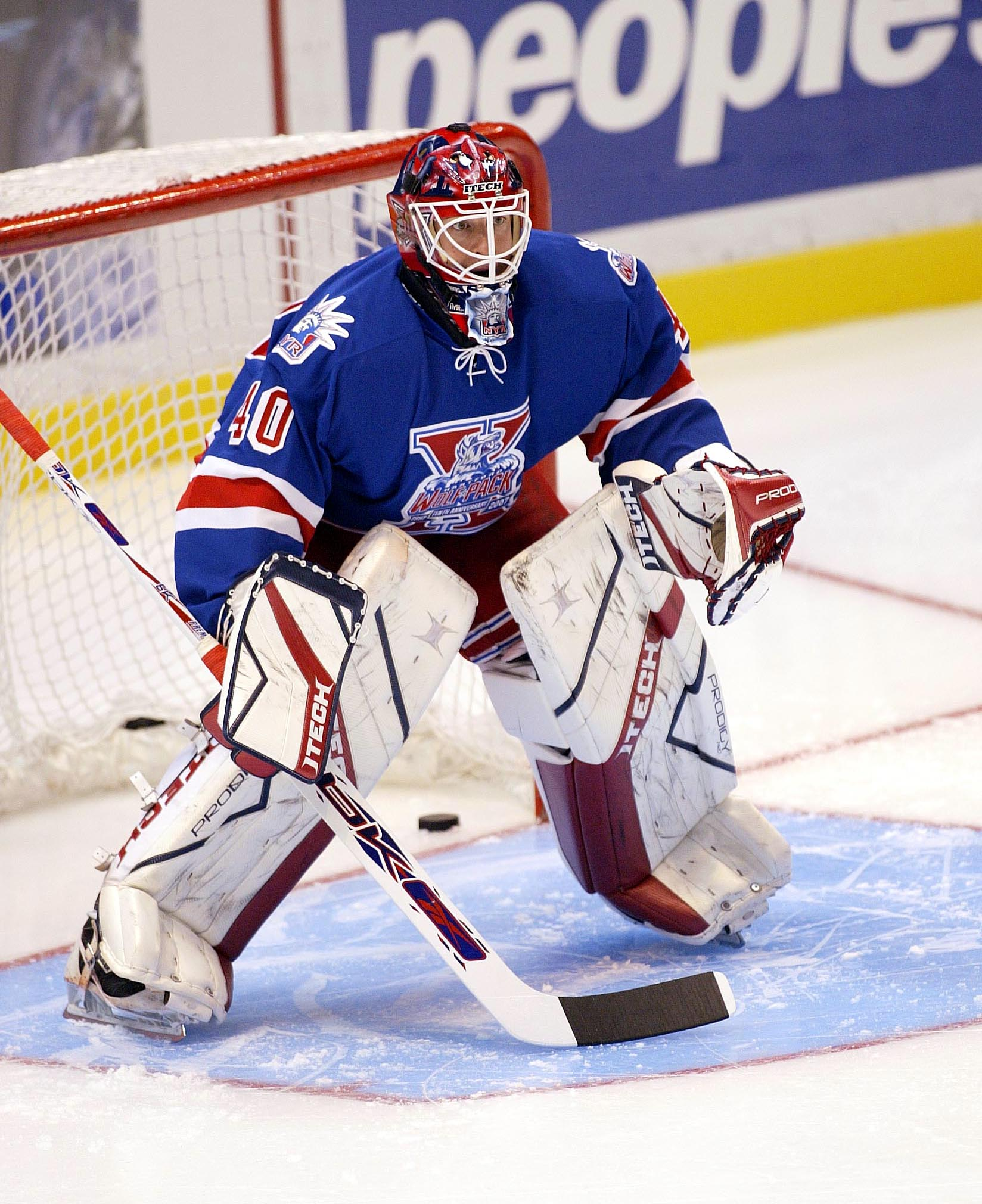
- Steve Valiquette
- Pronunciation: Canadian French pronunciation: [ˈvæɫɪˌkɛt]

Origin
- Origin: French
- Meaning: Roman foreigner

Other names
- Variant form: Numerous

Valiquette (with the variant Valiquet) is a French surname very rarely found in Europe and more commonly in North America. The surname Valiquet was first found in Dauphiny, a former province in southeastern France.

== Etymology ==
The name originates from a pet form of an ancient Germanic personal name Valhico or Walho. The core element of this Germanic name, walh or walah was used to describe inhabitants of the former Roman Empire, who were largely romanized and spoke Latin languages. It is widely accepted that "Valiquette" is an altered form of the French surname "Valiquet". This alternation is primarily phonetic, reflecting a linguistic characteristic prevalent in North American French. Specifically, the sounding of the final "-t" in "Valiquette," which might be silent in some European French dialects, is a recognized practice in Canadian and American French pronunciation. This adaptation is a significant marker of the name's evolution within the North American linguistic landscape, distinguishing it from its original French form.

== History ==
=== Establishment in North America ===
The establishment of the Valiquette name in North America is largely attributable to the arrival of early French settlers in what was then New France. In 1653, a Frenchman originating from Le Lude in Sarthe known as Jean Valiquet dit Laverdure was recruited by Paul de Chomedey, Sieur de Maisonneuve, to bolster the fledgling settlement of Montreal in New France. He signed a five-year contract with the Company of One Hundred Associates as a militiaman. He departed from Saint-Nazaire aboard the ship Saint-Nicolas on June 20, 1653, and arrived in Montreal on November 16, 1653.

== People ==
Notable people with the surname include:

- Esther Valiquette (1962 - 1994), Canadian documentary film director
- Gilles Valiquette (born 1952), Canadian musician, actor and record producer
- Jack Valiquette (born 1954), Canadian ice hockey player
- Marigene Valiquette (born 1924), American politician
- Max Valiquette (born 1973), Canadian television host
- Steve Valiquette (born 1977), Canadian ice hockey player

== See also ==
- Vallée
- Volcae
- Walhaz
- Walloons
