= Agnaldo Timóteo =

Brazilian politician (1936–2021)

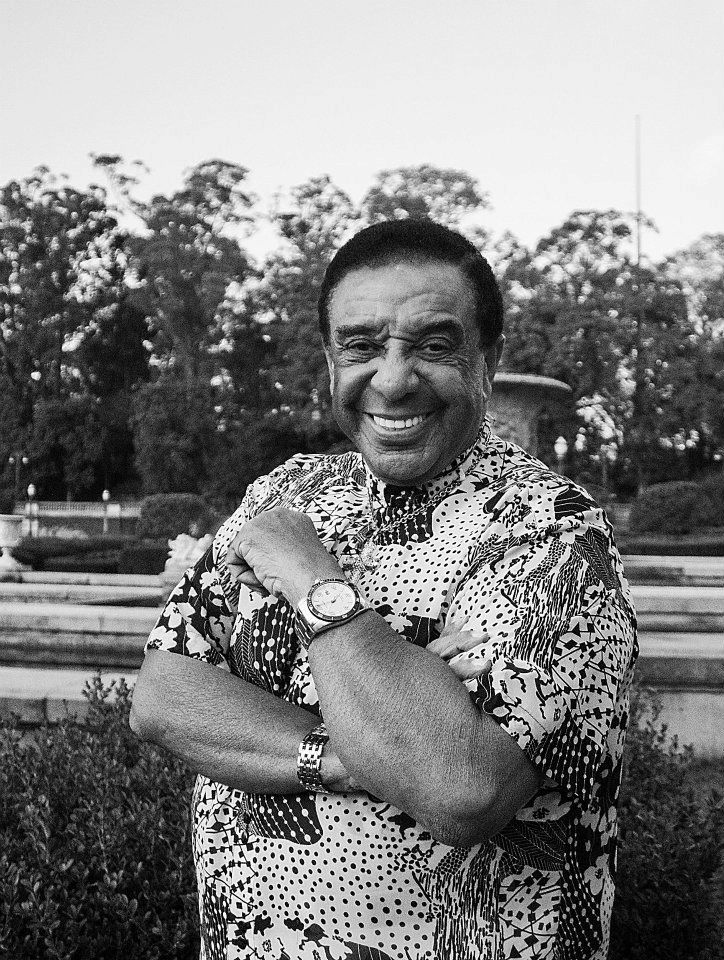
- Agnaldo Timóteo in February 2013

City Councillor of São Paulo
- In office January 1, 2005 – January 1, 2013

City Councillor of Rio de Janeiro
- In office January 1, 1997 – January 1, 2001

Federal Deputy from Rio de Janeiro
- In office May 3, 1995 – January 1, 1997
- In office February 1, 1983 – February 1, 1987

Personal details
- Born: Agnaldo Timóteo Pereira; October 16, 1936 Caratinga, Minas Gerais, Brazil
- Died: April 3, 2021 (aged 84) Rio de Janeiro, Brazil
- Cause of death: COVID-19
- Party: PDT (1982–85); PDS (1985–93); PPR (1993–95); PP (1995–2006); PR (2006–13); MDB (2016–18)
- Musical career
- Genres: MPB; Bolero; Bossa nova
- Occupations: Singer; songwriter; writer; politician
- Instruments: Vocals; Piano
- Years active: 1960–2021
- Labels: Caravelle; Odeon Records; Globo Columbia; Sony Music; Som Livre; Discobertas; Coqueiro Verde Records; Movie Play; Kuarup Music; Warner Music Brasil; Nova Estação
- Website: www.agnaldotimoteo.com.br

Agnaldo Timóteo Pereira (October 16, 1936 – April 3, 2021) was a Brazilian singer and politician.

== Early life ==
Timóteo held various jobs before becoming a successful singer. Since very young, he liked to imitate the singers of his own generation, such as Cauby Peixoto, Anísio Silva and Adilson Ramos. Born in a modest means family, by 9 years, he had worked to help at home, handing bags at stations, shining shoes, selling mangoes, cookies or cakes made by his mother.

Aged 12, he went to work with his father, exercising various tasks such as taking care of the cleaning and serving food in the restaurant. By that time he enjoyed singing and won all the contests promoted by circuses that came to town, singing and having success.

Later, after working in the mechanical function, since as an employee of the DNER, he moved to Governador Valadares, where he participated in all local radio programs, "Educator Rio Doce", especially in "Sunday's Day Off", skippered by John Dornelas, who believed in the future of "Bullfinch Caratinga" – his nickname at the time.

== Career ==
=== Artistic ===
Agnaldo Timóteo began his career singing in freshman programs on radios in Caratinga, Governador Valadares and Belo Horizonte, where he became known as the " Minas Gerais' Cauby Peixoto". He moved to Rio de Janeiro and started working as a driver of the singer Ângela Maria. Meanwhile, he continued his career and gradually became known nationally for his voice. Timóteo became famous when recording the Roberto Carlos' song Meu Grito. After he recorded several romantic hits as Ave-Maria, Mamãe and Os Verdes Campos De Minha Terra. He recorded more than 50 discs.

=== In politics ===
His political activity began in 1982 when he was elected federal deputy in Rio de Janeiro, by Democratic Labour Party (Brazil). In the mid-term, Timóteo fell out with Leonel Brizola, the party leader, and moved to the Democratic Social Party. In the Electoral College on January 15, 1985, which chose the Brazilian President (who had the Tancredo Neves victory), Timóteo voted for Paulo Maluf. He applied in 1986 for governor of Rio de Janeiro and was defeated; in 1994, he was re-elected Congressman.

In 1996 he was elected councilor in the city of Rio de Janeiro, but failed to secure re-election in 2000. Timóteo moved to São Paulo and in 2004 was elected councilor for the Progressive Party (Brazil), but due to disagreements with Celso Russomanno, went to the Liberal Party (now the Party of the Republic).

=== Ticker ===
On July 4, 2012, the newspaper O Estado de S. Paulo published an article accusing Timóteo and other 16 councilors of the city of São Paulo of defrauding the electronic board of the Municipal Chamber of São Paulo. In his defense, Agnaldo Timóteo argued that he had been present at the terminal next to the elevator.

In some cases, the paper said, employees were using panels that should be used exclusively for parliamentarians to make appointments, thus avoiding a discount of R$465 in a day payroll. The report of The State was accompanied by photographs, films and audio recordings made over 20 sessions of the House. The markings helped create laws and originated 18 proposals, so the practice is a criminal offense and may progress up to the cancellation of the warrant of parliamentarians involved.

== Personal life and death ==
Agnaldo Timóteo was a Roman Catholic.

Timóteo died in Rio de Janeiro on April 3, 2021, at the age of 84, due to COVID-19, after he had been hospitalized in the intensive care unit for seventeen days.

== Discography ==
- 1964 – Sábado no morro/Cruel solidão • Caravelle • 78
- 1965 – Surge um astro • Odeon • LP
- 1966 – O astro do sucesso • Odeon • LP
- 1967 – O sucesso é o astro • Odeon • LP
- 1967 – The Golden Voice of Brazil • LP
- 1968 – O sucesso é Agnaldo Timóteo • LP
- 1968 – Obrigado, querida • Odeon
- 1968 – Song by Brazilian International Famous Agnaldo Timoteo • LP
- 1969 – Comanda o sucesso • Odeon
- 1970 – O intérprete • Odeon • LP
- 1971 – Sempre sucesso • Odeon • LP
- 1972 – Os brutos também amam • LP
- 1973 – Frustrações • Odeon • LP
- 1974 – Encontro de gerações • Odeon • LP
- 1975 – Galeria do amor • LP
- 1976 – Te amo cada vez mais • EMI-Odeon • LP
- 1976 – Agnaldo Timóteo • EMI-Odeon • LP
- 1976 – Perdido na noite • LP
- 1977 – Eu pecador • EMI-Odeon • LP
- 1979 – Deixe-me viver • EMI • LP
- 1979 – Angela & Timóteo, juntos • LP
- 1980 – Companheiros • LP
- 1981 – Sonhar Contigo • EMI-Odeon • LP
- 1981 – Agnaldo Timóteo & Carmen Costa – Na Galeria do amor • LP
- 1983 – Alô, mamãe. Eu te amo • Soma • LP
- 1983 – Eu agradeço • LP
- 1985 – Descobrimos nossas cores • LP
- 1986 – Presente de Deus • LP
- 1987 – ...Ontem, hoje e sempre • 3M • LP
- 1989 – Presente
- 1992 – Uma palavra só... Perdão • LP
- 1994 – Meus momentos – Agnaldo Timóteo • CD
- 1995 – Obrigado, mãe • CD
- 1996 – Revivendo os grandes sucessos de Agnaldo Timóteo • CD
- 1997 – Meus momentos – Vol. 2- Agnaldo Timóteo • CD
- 1997 – Ao Nelson com carinho • Globo/Columbia • CD
- 1998 – Em nome do amor – Agnaldo Timóteo canta Roberto Carlos • CD
- 1999 – Ângela & Agnaldo – Sucesso sempre! • Sony Music • CD
- 2006 – Feitiço do Rio • Jobim Music – 71168048-3 • CD
- 2008 – Agnaldo Timóteo • Compacto Duplo
- 2008 – Agnaldo Timóteo en Español • CD
- 2010 – Obrigado São Paulo. Obrigado Brasil • CD
- 2010 – Agnaldo Timóteo Sempre • CD
- 2012 – Minha Oração • CD
