= Shingo Tano =

Japanese comedian and chiropractor (born 1979)

- 楽しんご
- Born: Shingo Sato (佐藤 信吾, Satō Shingo); 15 March 1979 (age 47); Yokohama, Kanagawa Prefecture, Japan
- Occupations: Comedian; chiropractor
- Years active: 2000–06 (actor); 2006– (comedian)
- Agents: Wild Thing; K Dash Stage; freelancer; Yoshimoto Creative Agency-Tokyo Yoshimoto
- Style: Manzai; conte
- Television: Enta no Kamisama; Bakushō Pink Carpet; Arabiki-dan
- Height: 186 cm (6 ft 1 in)

Shingo Tano (楽しんご, Tano Shingo; born 15 March 1979) is a Japanese comedian and chiropractor.

== Filmography ==
=== Television ===
Former appearances

Year	Title	Network	Ref.
2007	Enta no Kamisama	NTV	
2007	Bakushō Pink Carpet	Fuji TV	
2008	Waratte Iitomo!	Fuji TV	
2009	Arabiki-dan	TBS	
2011	All-Star Thanksgiving	TBS	
2011	London Hearts	TV Asahi	
2011	Bakushō sokkuri monomane Kōhaku Uta Gassen Special	Fuji TV	
2011	Oha Suta	TV Tokyo	
	Ikinari! Kogane Densetsu.	TV Asahi	

Programmes that appeared in acting, amateur

Title	Network
Waratte Iitomo!	Fuji TV
Tonneruzu no Minasan no Okage deshita	Fuji TV
Otaiba Dodonpa	Fuji TV
Ohayō Nice Day	Fuji TV
Aa! Bara-iro no Chin-sei	NTV
UnNan no Honto Ko!	TBS
Nichiyō Big Variety	TV Tokyo
Shittoku! Kuruma Jōhō-kyoku	BS Asahi

=== Internet ===
Year	Title	Website
2006	Mensetsu-ō DX	GyaO!
2007	Takemi Net	A'! Tōdoroku Hōsōkyoku
2009	Yoasobi Mail Battle Kayō	A'! Tōdoroku Hōsōkyoku
2010	Ashita! Kō naru TV	Yahoo! Variety
2010	Kakumei Daradara TV	Ustream
2011	Shingo Tano Interview Motteco Shoten	

=== Films (movies) ===
Year	Title	Ref.
2005	Nagurimono	

=== Direct-to-video ===
Year	Title	Role
2000	Eiga Yume Hiroba	
2001	Ryūō-jū-tachi no Okite	Akira Ryuuta
2002	Araburu Tamashī-tachi	
2006	Catanaman	Okama Cyborg Zoo No. 1

=== Films ===
Year	Title
2000	Namisen no Maris

=== TV dramas ===
Year	Title	Role	Network	Ref.
2011	Binandesu ne	Hair Makeup Toru	TBS	

=== Magazines ===
Title	Publisher	Notes
Owarai Popolo	Azabadai Publishing House	As Mint Brothers
Junon	Shufu to Seikatsu-sha	As Mint Brothers
ViVi	Kodansha	
popteen		
From A		

=== Radio ===
Year	Title	Network
2010	Yūyake Tera-chan: Katsudō-chū	NCB

=== Advertisements ===
Title	Notes
Yahoo! Japan	
Suntory "Vitamin Water"	
Earth Chemical "Sebon"	
Recruit "Townwork"	
Nexon Sudden Attack	
Tokyo Gas "Tokyo Gas Story 2 Tokodanbō"	Gas-Pa-Cho! Series; co-starred with Mikihisa Azuma

=== Video games ===
Year	Title	Role	Ref.
2012	Sweet Fuse: At Your Side	Waldbou	

== Discography ==
=== Singles ===
Year	Title	Ref.
2011	Dodosuko poi poi no uta (Shingo Tano to Ayaman Japan)	

=== Music videos ===
Year	Video	Ref.
2011	Dodosuko poi poi no uta	

=== Video works ===
Year	Title
2011	

== See also ==
- List of Japanese actors
