= Linda Valli =

American educator and academic

- Occupations: Academic; Educator

Academic background
- Education: Mercy College of Detroit (BA); Johns Hopkins University (MLA); University of Wisconsin–Madison (PhD)

Academic work
- Discipline: Teacher education
- Institutions: University of Maryland; Catholic University of America

Linda Valli is an American educator and academic. She was a professor in the Department of Teaching and Learning, Policy and Leadership at the University of Maryland, College Park. She has authored several books, research papers and reports related to teaching and education.

== Early life and education ==
Linda Valli received a Bachelor of Arts in English, with a secondary teaching certificate, from Mercy College of Detroit in 1970. She subsequently earned a Master of Liberal Arts from Johns Hopkins University in 1976, and a graduate study in education at the University of Chicago. She earned her PhD in educational policy studies from the University of Wisconsin–Madison in 1983.

== Career ==
Valli began her career as a secondary-school teacher in Grand Rapids, Michigan in 1970. She later taught literature at the Hawthorne Center for Emotionally Disturbed Children in Livonia. She taught humanities, and social studies at a high school in Farmington Hills from 1971 to 1977. In 1978, she briefly worked as a research assistant in University of Chicago and as an administrative assistant at the National Training Laboratories.

While pursuing her doctorate at the University of Wisconsin–Madison, Valli worked as a lecturer and research assistant in the Department of Education at the university. After completing her doctorate, she joined the Catholic University of America in 1983 as Assistant Professor of Education and Director of Teacher Education. She was promoted to Associate Professor in 1989 and remained at the university until 1993.

In 1994, Valli joined the University of Maryland, College Park, where she served as Associate Professor in the Department of Curriculum and Instruction till 2007. She simultaneously held the position of Associate Dean for Professional Studies at the College of Education of the university from 1994 to 1997. In 2007, she was appointed the inaugural Jeffrey and David Mullan Professor in Teacher Education–Professional Development. She was appointed as the Interim Chair of the Department of Curriculum and Instruction in 2008. She received the Alumni Achievement Award from the University of Wisconsin-Madison School of Education in the same years. She retired in 2016.

Valli has authored several books, research papers and reports related to teaching and education. Valli is part of the LGBTQ community, and has been involved in framing policies for the recruitment of LGBTQ educators, and research on the experiences of LGBTQ teaching community.
