= Laura Vasilescu =

Romanian handball player (born 1984)

Personal information
- Full name: Laura Nicoleta Vasilescu
- Nationality: Romanian
- Born: 3 November 1984 (age 41) Buzău, Romania
- Height: 1.80 m (5 ft 11 in)

Sport
- Sport: Handball
- Position: Left Back
- Current club: HSG Bad Wildungen
- Number: 23

Laura Nicoletta Vasilescu (born 3 November 1984) is a Romanian female handballer who plays for HSG Bad Wildungen in Bundesliga.

She was the best scorer of the 2014-15 Bundesliga season, with 230 goals in 26 games.

== Personal life ==
In September 2019, Vasilescu announced that she came out as lesbian.

== Individual awards ==
- Bundesliga Top Scorer: 2015
