= José de Meneses da Silveira e Castro, 2nd Marquis of Valada =

His Excellency The Marquis of Valada ComC ComSE
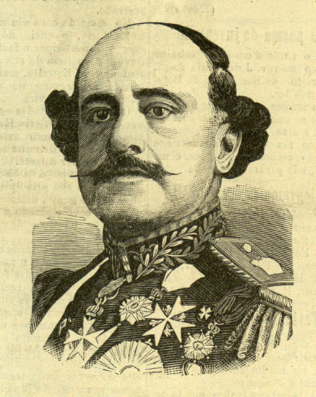

Civil Governor of the Braga District
- In office 11 December 1884 – 21 January 1886
- Prime Minister: Fontes Pereira de Melo
- Preceded by: Jerónimo da Cunha Pimentel
- Succeeded by: Joaquim Peito de Carvalho
- In office 5 April 1877 – 6 February 1878
- Prime Minister: The Marquis of Ávila e Bolama
- Preceded by: The Viscount of Magaride
- Succeeded by: Joaquim Cabral de Noronha e Meneses

Personal details
- Born: 13 February 1826 Portugal
- Died: 15 October 1895 (aged 69) Lisbon, Portugal
- Party: Regenerator Party
- Spouse: D. Maria Isabel do Carmo Paula Máxima Gonzaga de Bragança (m. 1848)
- Children: 2
- Occupation: Politician

D. José de Meneses e Távora Rappach da Silveira e Castro, 2nd Marquis of Valada ComC ComSE (13 February 1826 – 15 October 1895) was a Portuguese nobleman and politician aligned with the conservative Regenerator Party. Well-regarded as a man of great erudition and a notable parliamentarian, the Marquis of Valada was the protagonist of a well-publicised scandal in 1881, after his homosexuality became a matter of public knowledge.

== Biography ==
He was the only son, and only child of the second marriage of D. Francisco Xavier de Meneses da Silveira e Castro, 1st Count of Caparica and 1st Marquis of Valada (1754–1834) to D. Francisca de Almeida Portugal (1792–1873), the daughter of the 3rd Marquis of Lavradio. From his father's first marriage, he had five half-sisters. By all accounts, Valada was of refined learning and unusual scholarship: he was well-read in the Greek and Latin classics, and frequently cited Homer and Virgil in his parliamentary elocutions; a possessor of a remarkable memory, he was remembered as a veritable repository of political history, both ancient and modern.

His father died in 1834, and he succeeded him as his heir; the inheritance of the title of Marquis of Valada was confirmed by royal decree on 1 December 1831. The title of Count of Caparica was instead passed on directly to Valada's son, by his request.

He was married in Paris, on 19 July 1848, to D. Maria Isabel do Carmo Paula Máxima Gonzaga de Bragança, daughter of the 3rd Dukes of Lafões. The couple had two children: D. Francisco Xavier de Meneses, 2nd Count of Caparica, and D. Ana Maria Antónia da Conceição de Meneses e Távora.

=== Travessa da Espera scandal ===
On the night of 2 August 1881, the police caught the Marquis of Valada in compromising circumstances with a common soldier in Travessa da Espera, a narrow street in Lisbon's Bairro Alto. Valada was serving as deputy Civil Governor of Lisbon at the time. The soldier and the landlady were arrested but Valada, as a member of the aristocracy, managed to escape arrest. Even though homosexuality was not illegal in Portugal at the time, Valada quickly resigned from his post of deputy civil governor. It soon after emerged that Valada had been set up by António Arrobas, the civil governor, motivated by personal and political internal rivalries.

The opposition newspapers got wind of the story; the strength of the reaction was not only due to the social mores of the day, but partly because the incident confirmed pre-existing suspicions.

=== As Civil Governor of Braga ===
It seems that the Marquis of Valada began to regain his political prominence, however; by the summer of 1885, his rehabilitation appeared complete: the government appointed him civil governor of Braga, in northern Portugal. However, he soon became embroiled in political intrigue surrounding local figures involved in clandestine emigration rackets; he issued a gratuitous statement saying that, while the central government remained in power, he would remain as civil governor as long as he wanted to. This was met with by derision by the opposition; the press accused Valada of "dragging the authorities through the mud of ridicule". The government, led by Fontes Pereira de Melo, further exacerbated the situation by issuing a statement in the Diário do Governo, the official gazette, commending Valada.

The row became so contentious that the city of Guimarães tried to secede from the Braga District and join the neighbouring Porto District. The situation was viewed with alarm in Lisbon, as it caused considerable local political agitation, and that particular area had been the scene of a violent peasant uprising just forty years earlier. Even though the secessionist movement was thwarted and Valada was ultimately forced to resign, the dispute has been cited as the cause of the fall of the Regenerator-led government some weeks later.
