= Max Valiquette =

Canadian television host (born 1973)

- Born: 1973 (age 52–53); Ottawa, Ontario, Canada
- Education: University of Ottawa
- Occupation: Businessman
- Employer: Youthography
- Website: www.maxvaliquette.com

Max Valiquette is a Canadian culture and media expert and commentator. A marketer by trade, he was the president of Youthography, a Canadian youth marketing agency, which is where he gained renown. He led strategy for advertising agency Bensimon Byrne as well as Publicis Canada.

Most recently Valiquette was the Executive Director of Communications for Prime Minister Justin Trudeau from 2023 to 2025.

Valiquette is best known as a TV host and commentator and a public speaker. He focuses primarily on media, youth and popular culture, and marketing. He is a regular contributor to CBC Radio and also a featured commentator on the television programme "What's in a Name." He hosted TVOntario's VoxTalk, a youth-issues talk show, and has appeared everywhere from MuchMusic, to CBC Television and Global TV. He is a speaker on issues pertaining to media and marketing in Canada and around the world, as well as the author of numerous industry articles. He has served three times as Chairperson of Strategy Magazine's "Understanding Youth Conference". He is a former director of the board of the Canada Media Fund.

He previously performed as a sketch comedian in Toronto, including a performance at The Second City. He is a former Central Canadian Debating Champion.

Valiquette was born in Ottawa, Ontario, in 1973. He studied at the University of Ottawa where he earned a Bachelor of Arts degree. In 2005, he was named one of Marketing Magazine's 100 Most Influential People in Canadian Communications.
