= List of gay, lesbian or bisexual people: W–Z =

This is a partial list of notable people who were or are gay men, lesbian or bisexual.

The historical concept and definition of sexual orientation varies and has changed greatly over time; for example the general term "gay" was not used to describe sexual orientation until the mid-20th century. A number of different classification schemes have been used to describe sexual orientation since the mid-19th century, and scholars have often defined the term "sexual orientation" in divergent ways. Indeed, several studies have found that much of the research about sexual orientation has failed to define the term at all, making it difficult to reconcile the results of different studies. However, most definitions include a psychological component (such as the direction of an individual's erotic desire) and/or a behavioural component (which focuses on the sex of the individual's sexual partner/s). Some prefer to simply follow an individual's self-definition or identity.

The high prevalence of people from the West on this list may be due to societal attitudes towards homosexuality. The Pew Research Center's 2013 Global Attitudes Survey found that there is “greater acceptance in more secular and affluent countries,” with "publics in 39 countries [having] broad acceptance of homosexuality in North America, the European Union, and much of Latin America, but equally widespread rejection in predominantly Muslim nations and in Africa, as well as in parts of Asia and in Russia. Opinion about the acceptability of homosexuality is divided in Israel, Poland and Bolivia.” As of 2013, Americans are divided – a majority (60 percent) believes homosexuality should be accepted, while 33 percent disagree.

== W ==
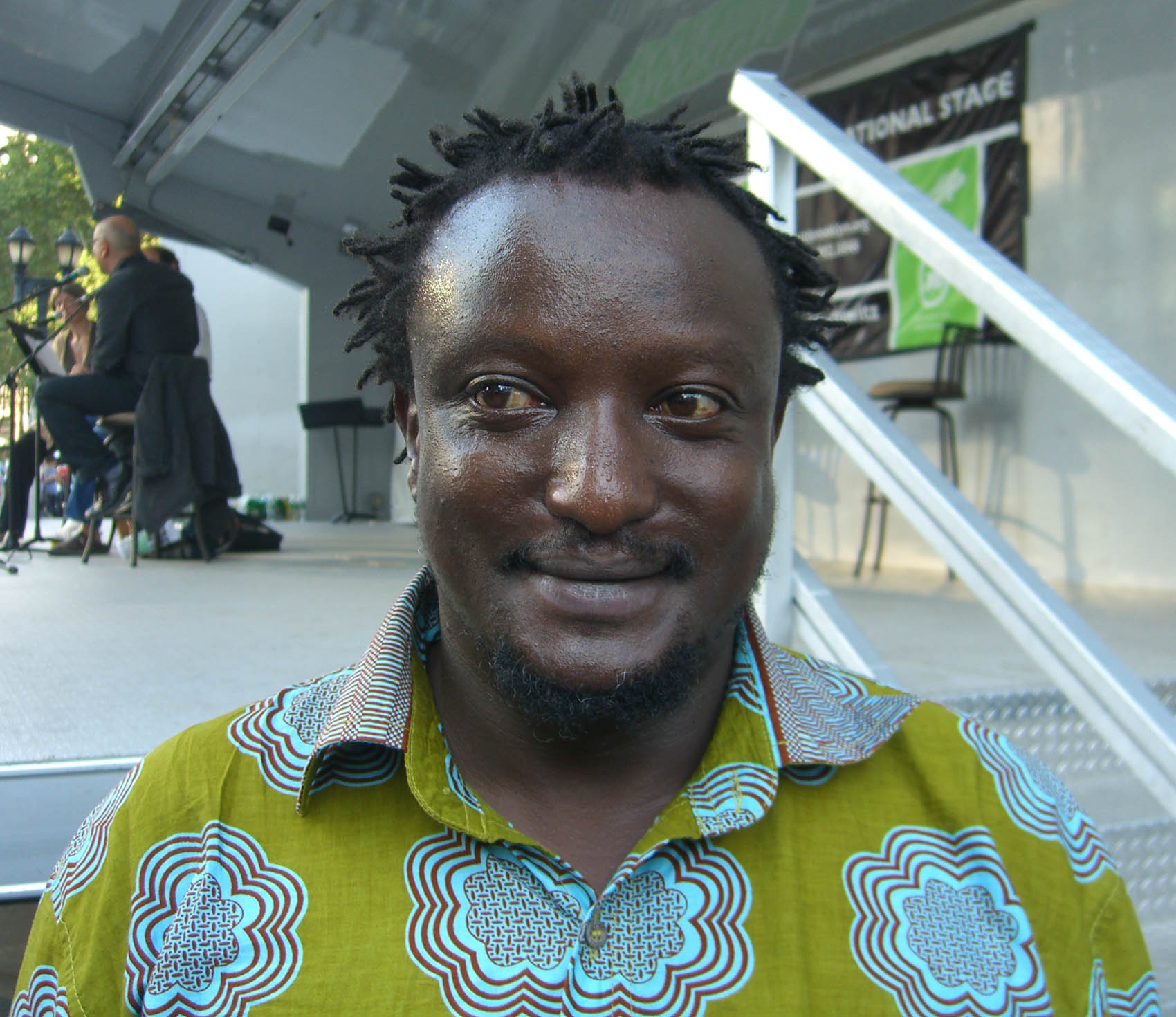
Journalist and author Binyavanga Wainaina

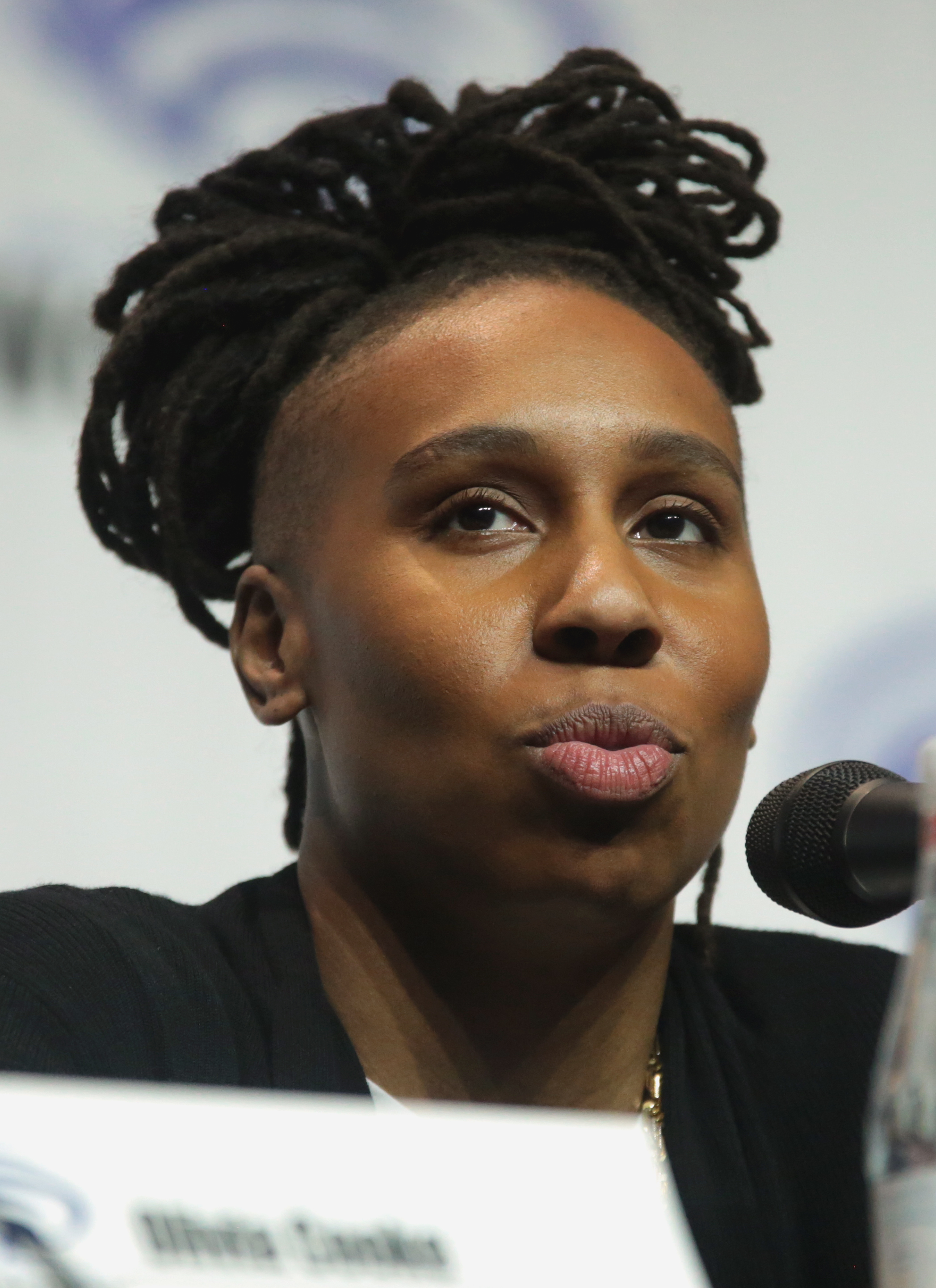
Screenwriter, producer and actress Lena Waithe

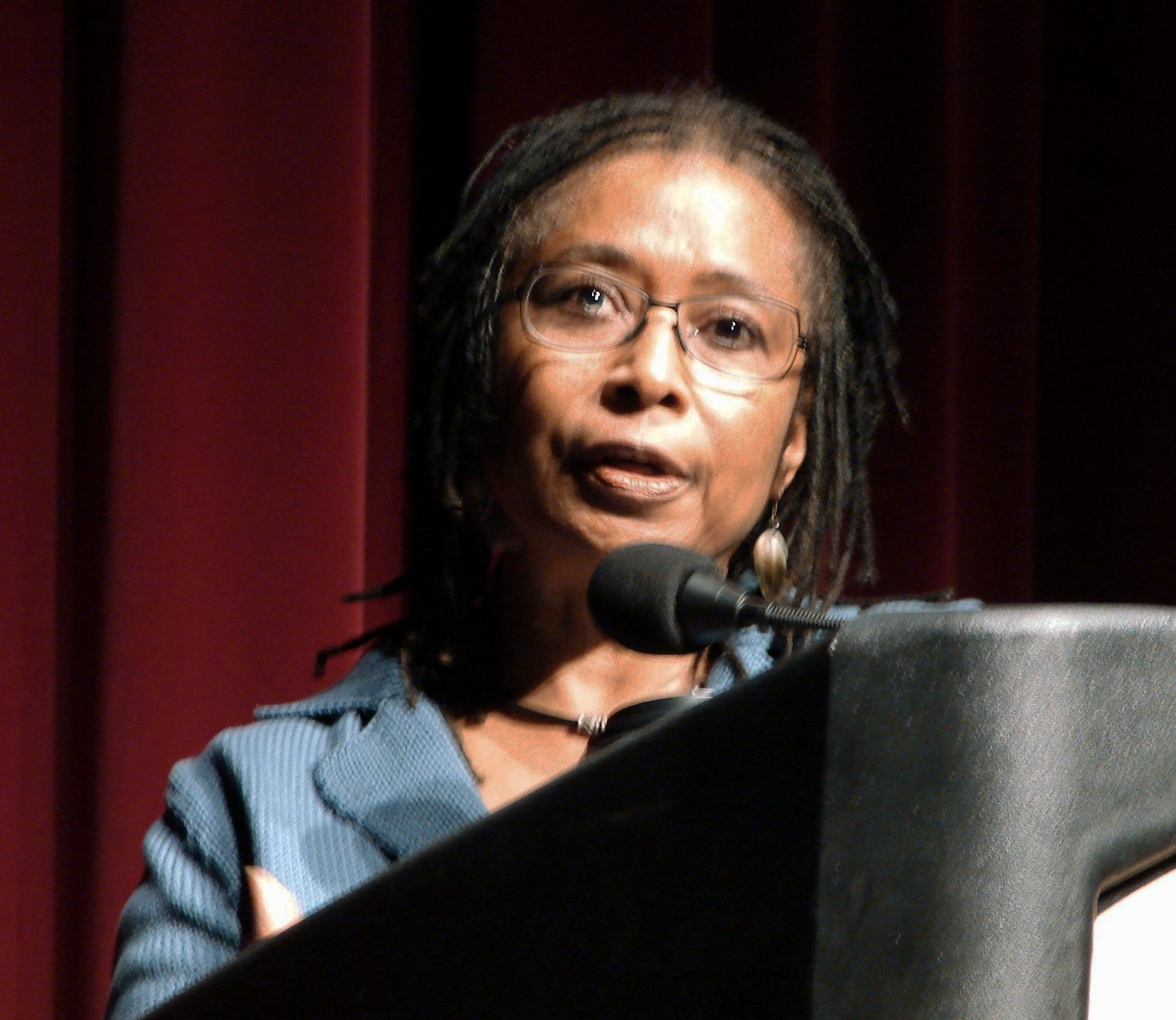
Novelist and activist Alice Walker

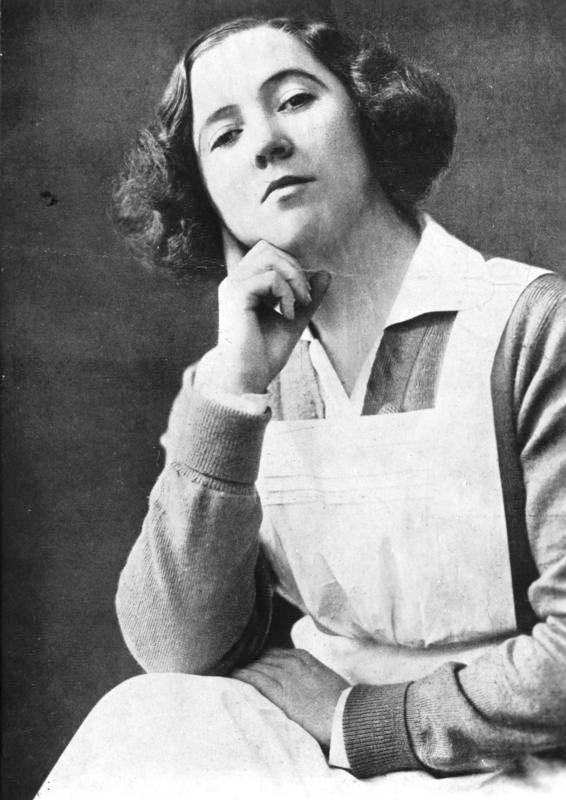
Singer Claire Waldoff

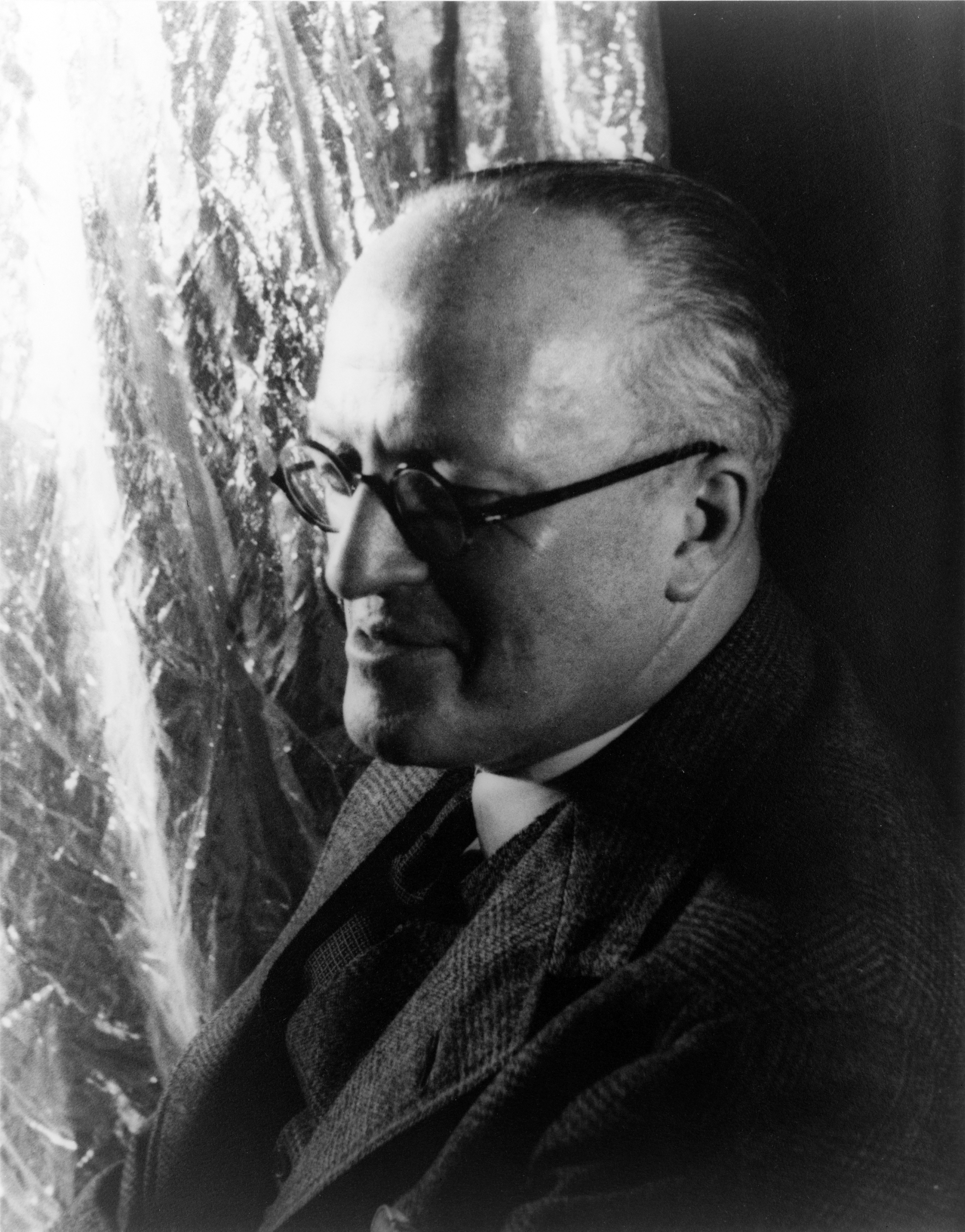
Writer Hugh Walpole

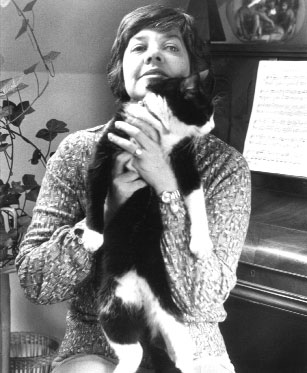
Poet, novelist and musician María Elena Walsh

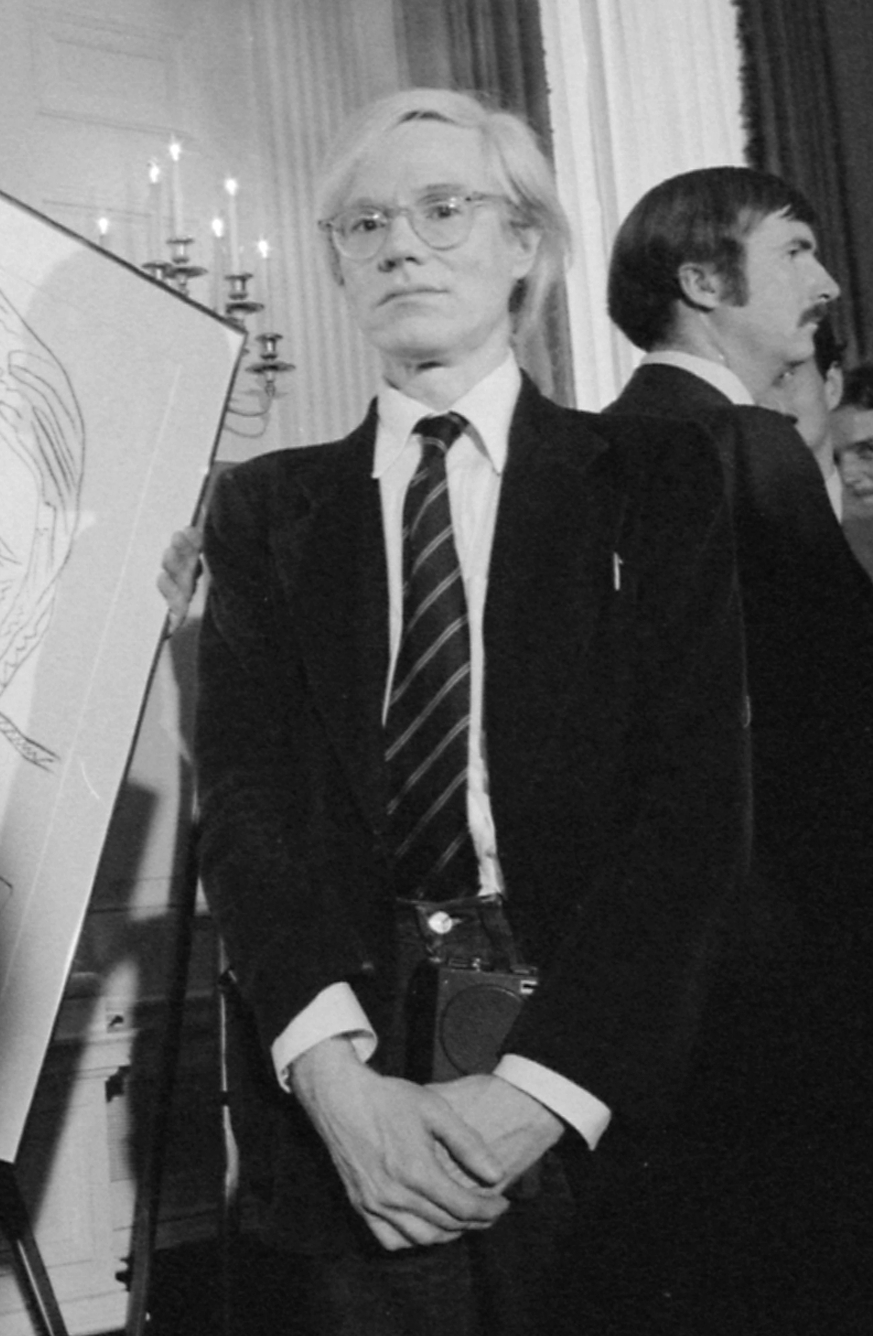
Artist Andy Warhol

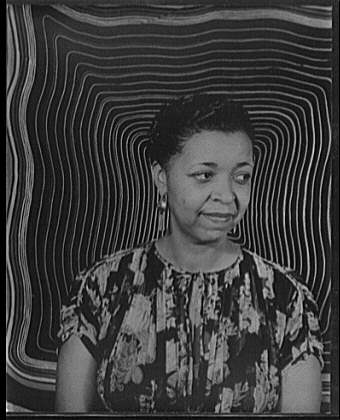
Musician Ethel Waters

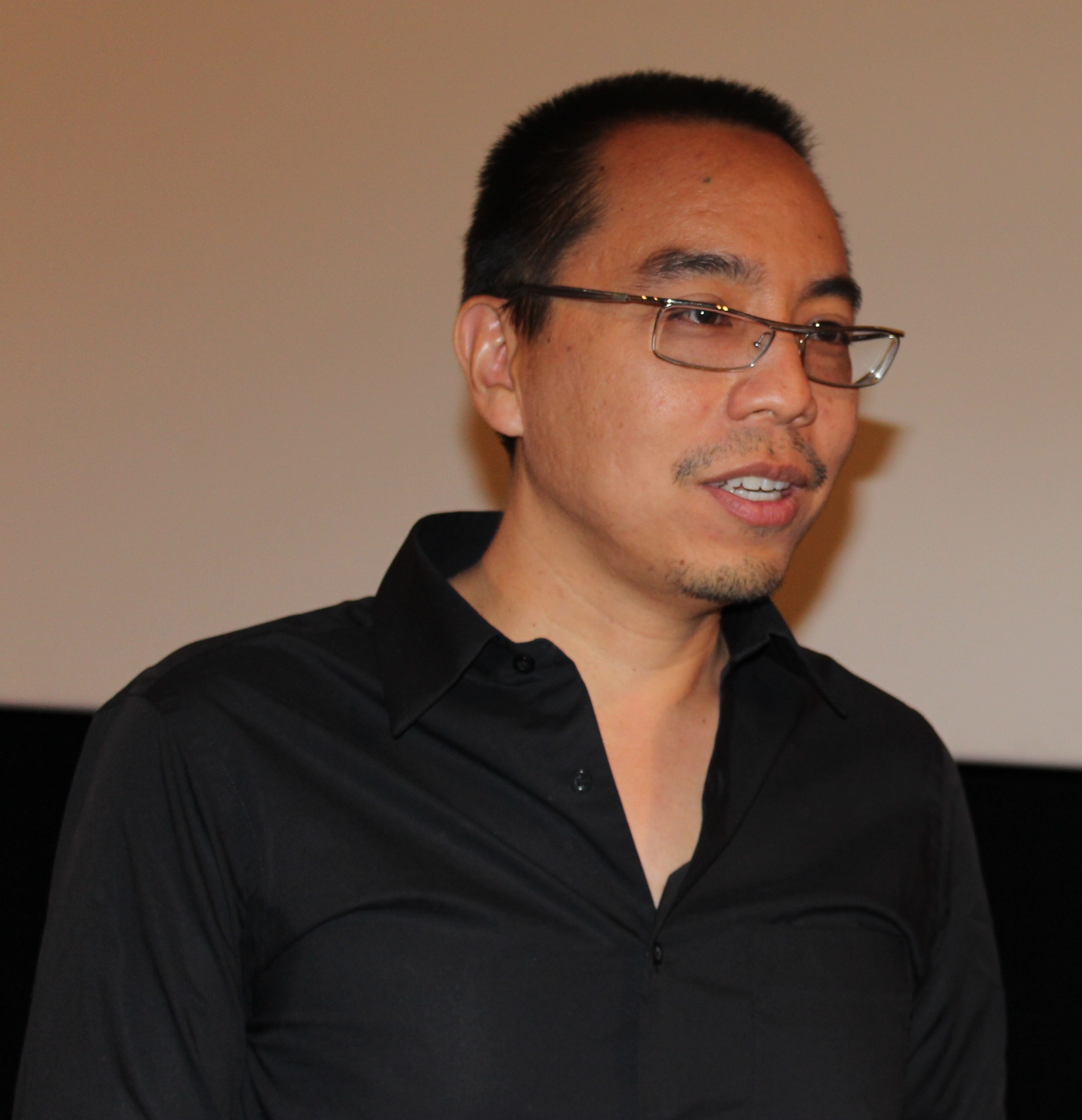
Film director Apichatpong Weerasethakul

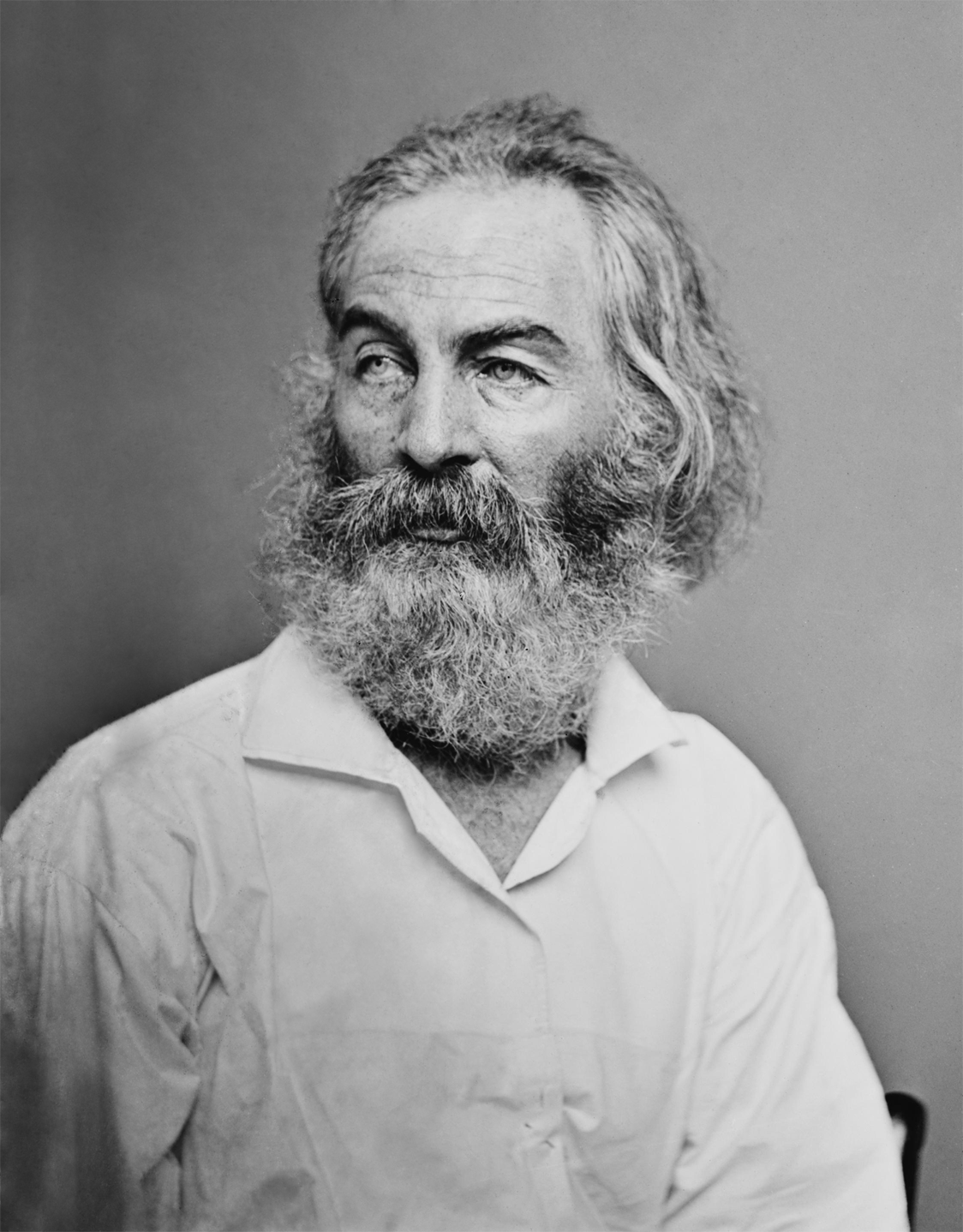
Writer Walt Whitman

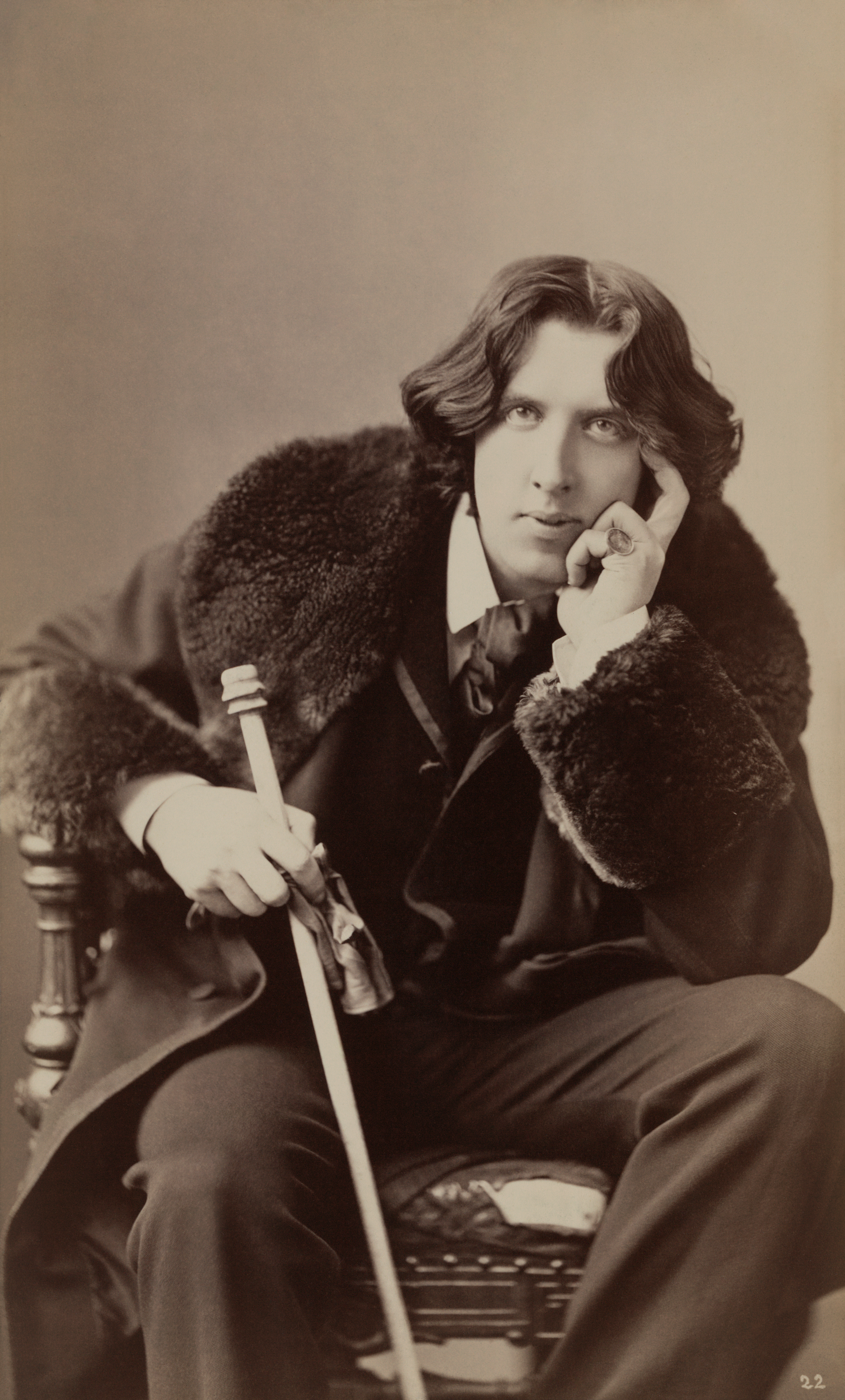
Playwright Oscar Wilde

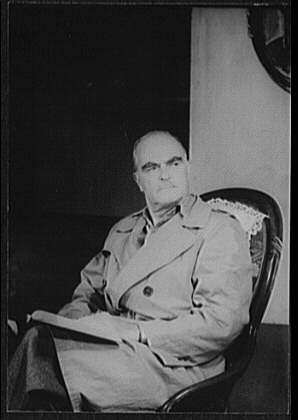
Playwright Thornton Wilder

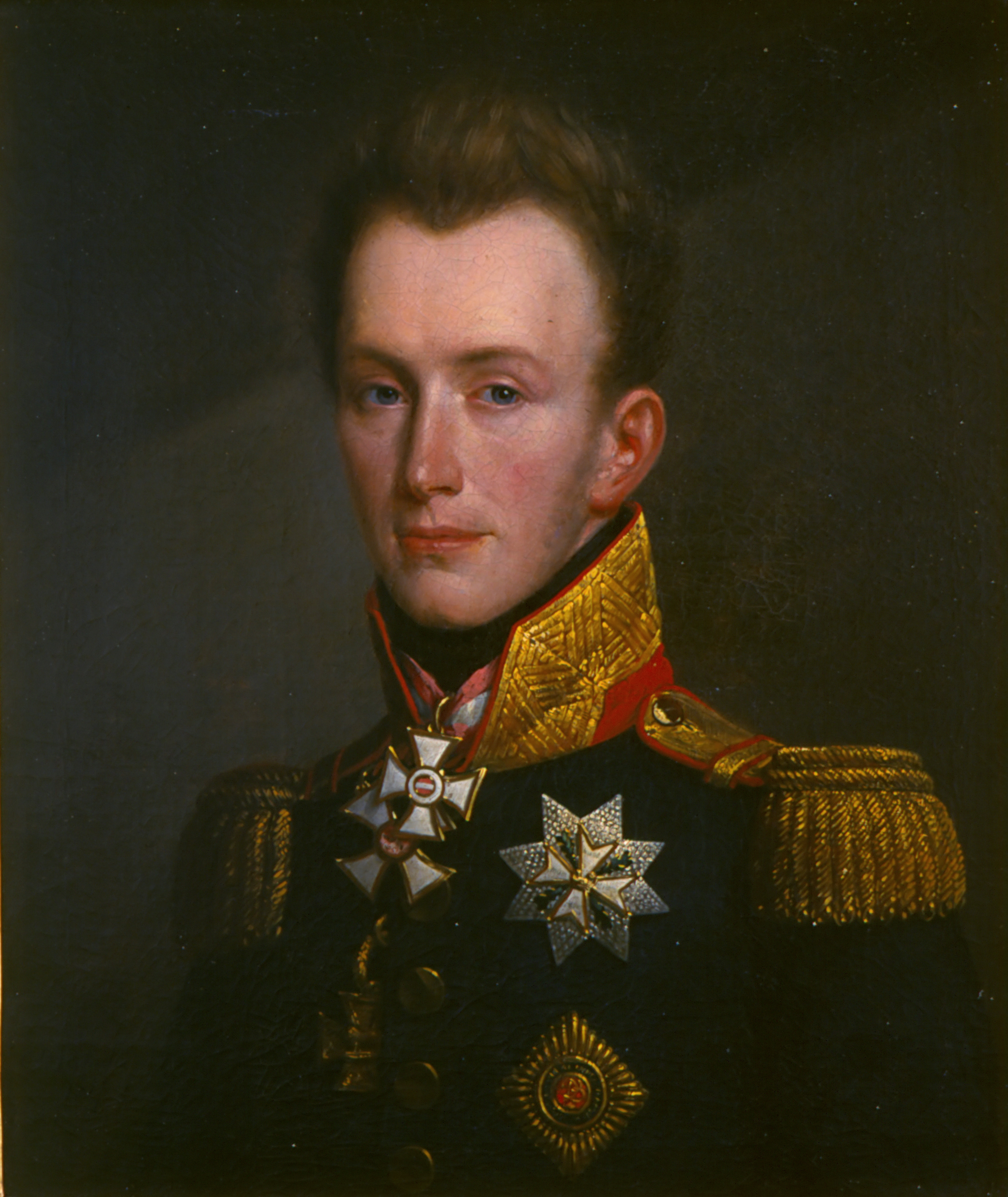
William II of the Netherlands

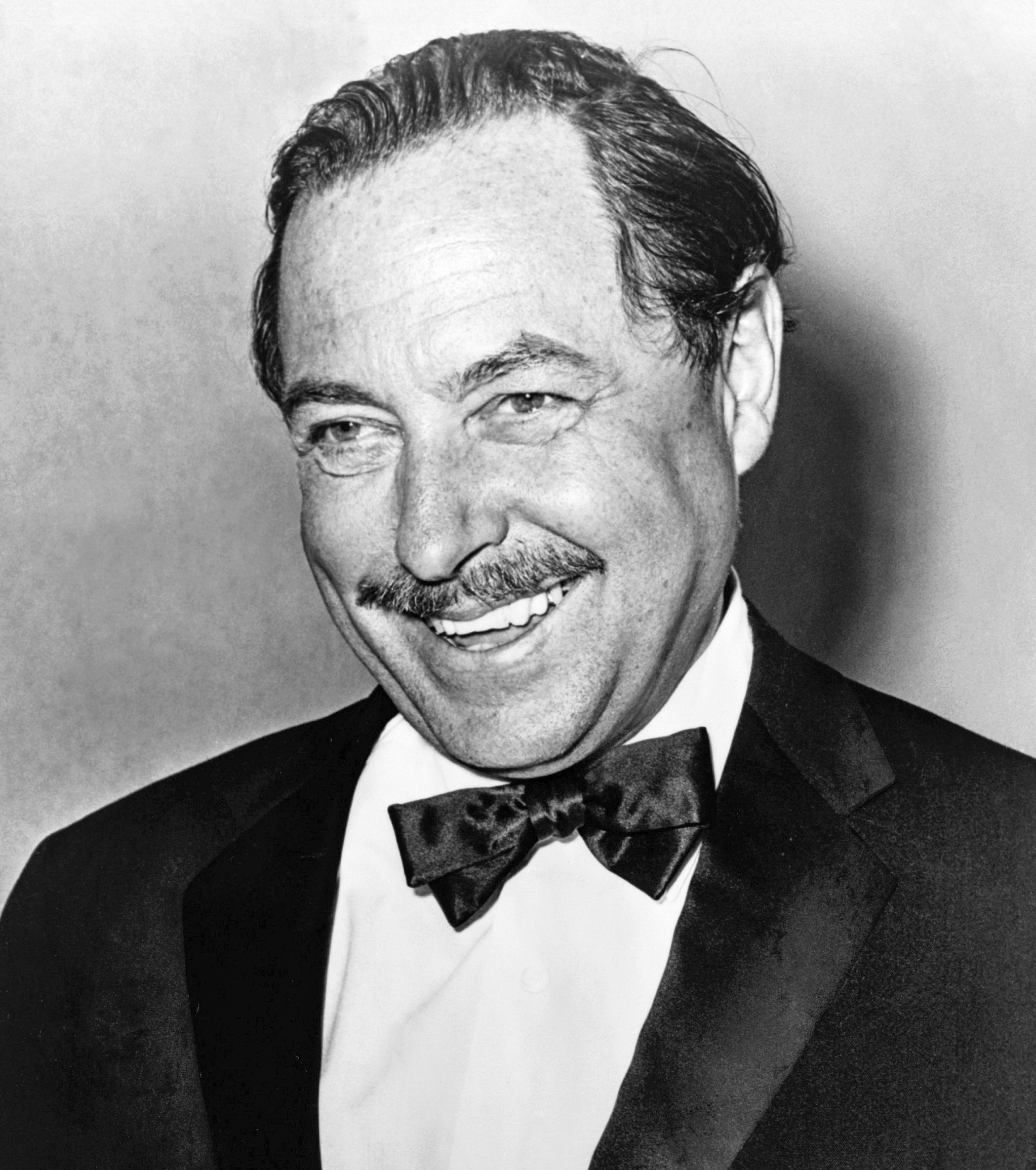
Playwright Tennessee Williams

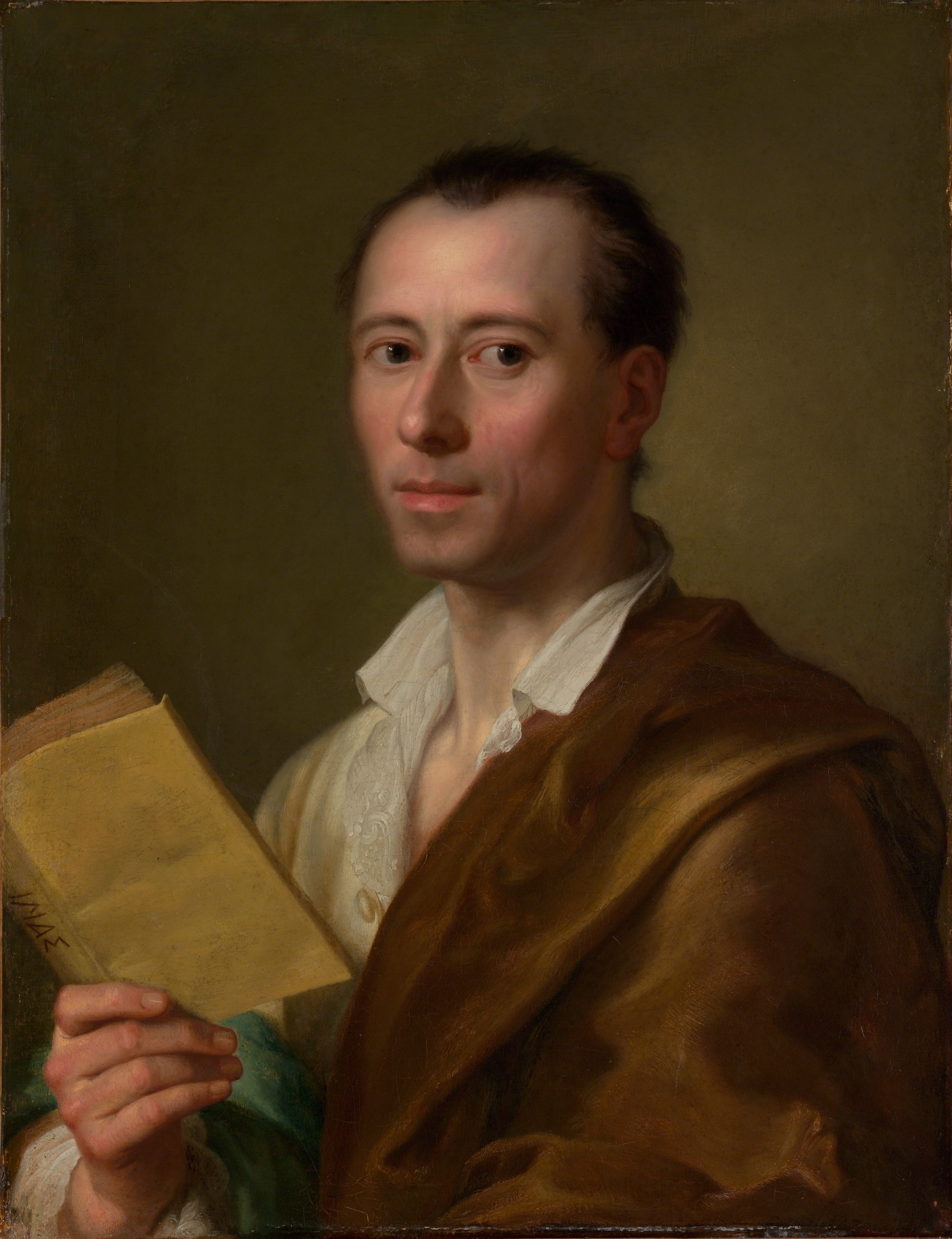
Archaeologist and art historian Johann Joachim Winckelmann

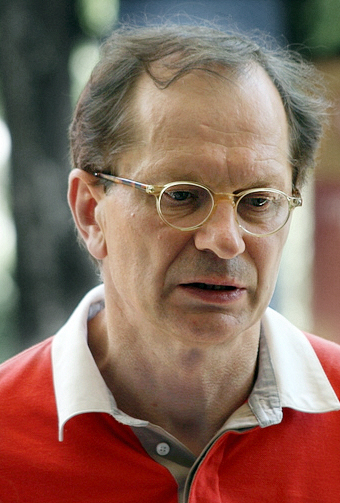
Writer Josef Winkler

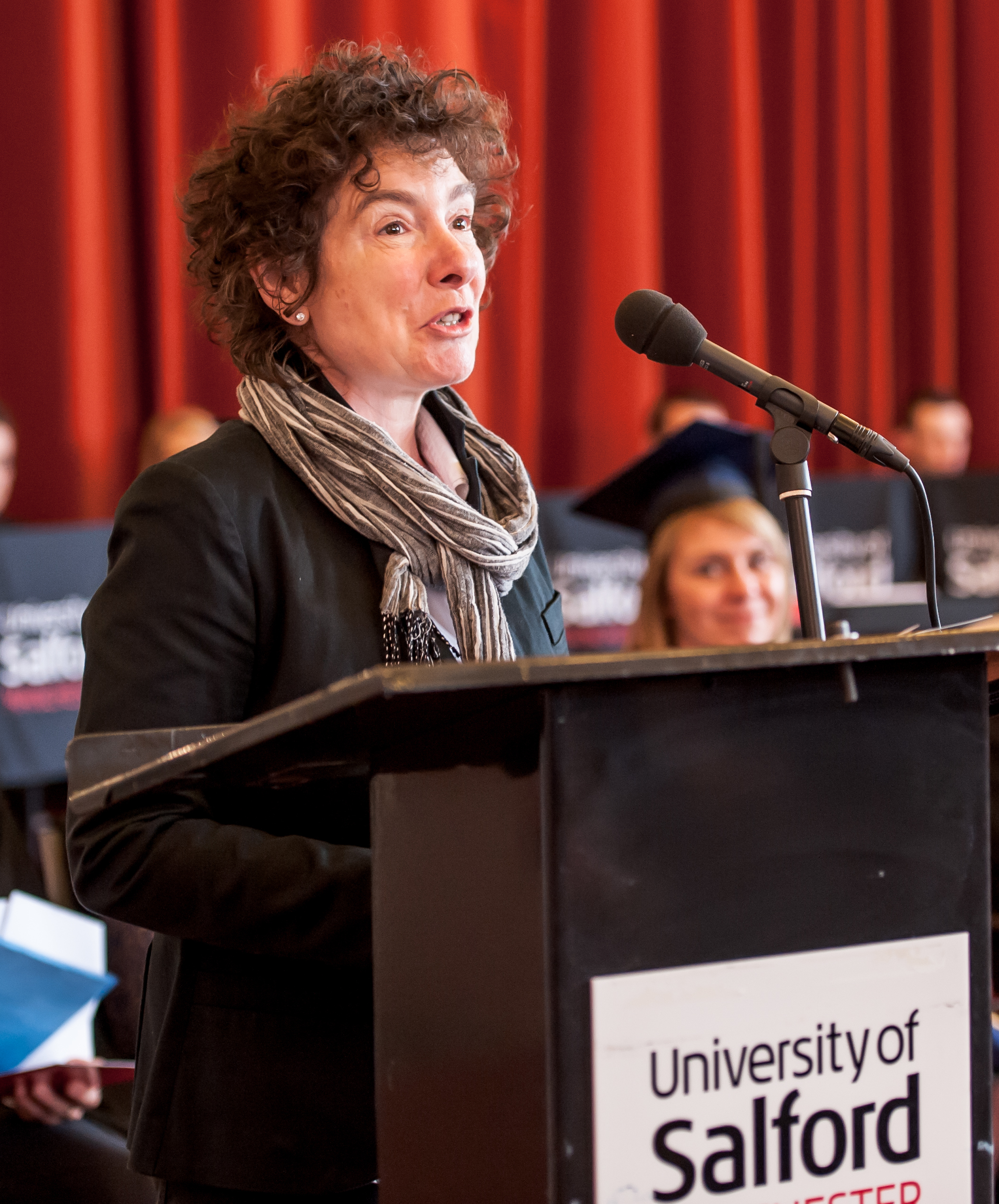
Writer Jeanette Winterson

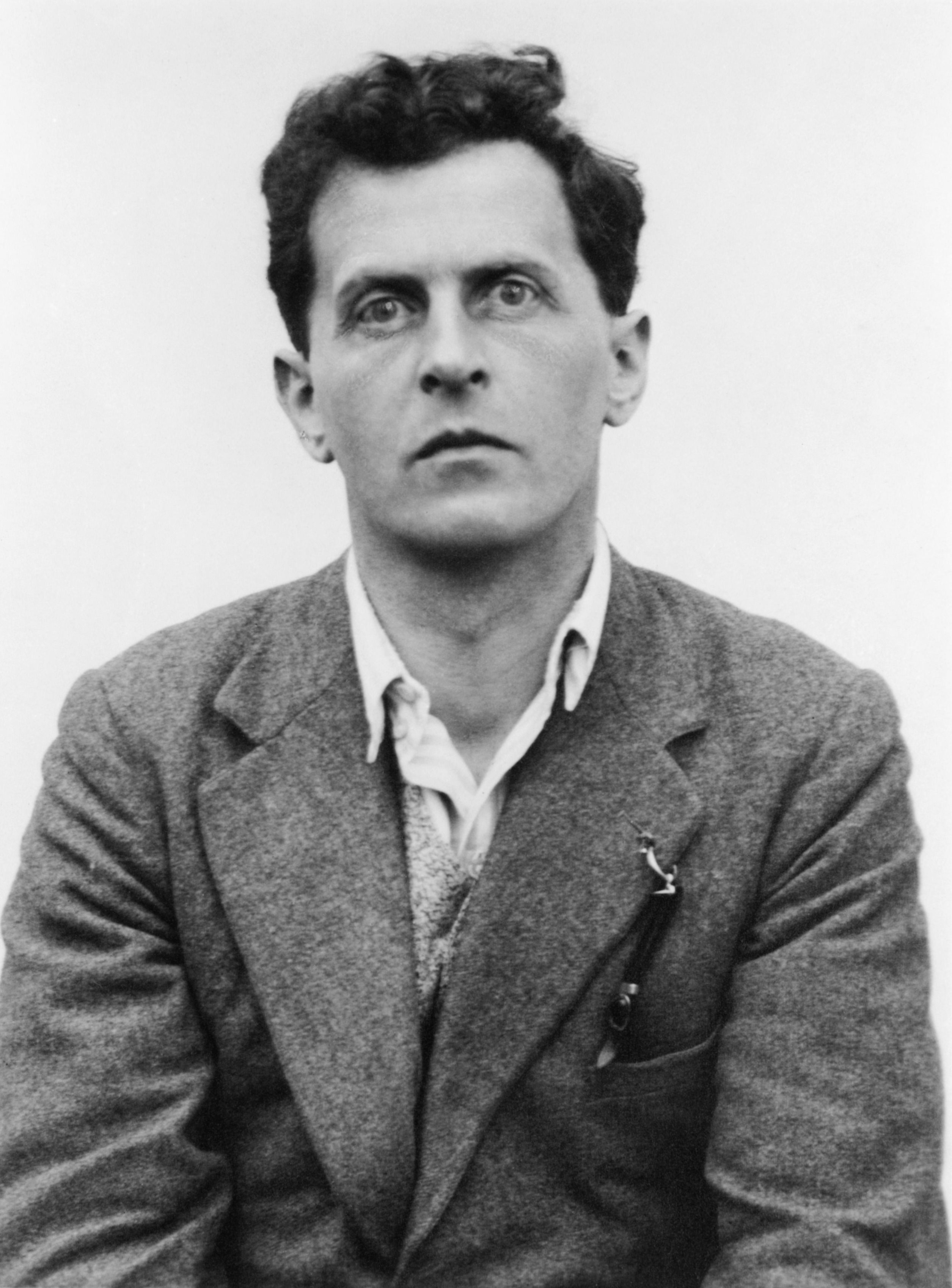
Philosopher Ludwig Wittgenstein

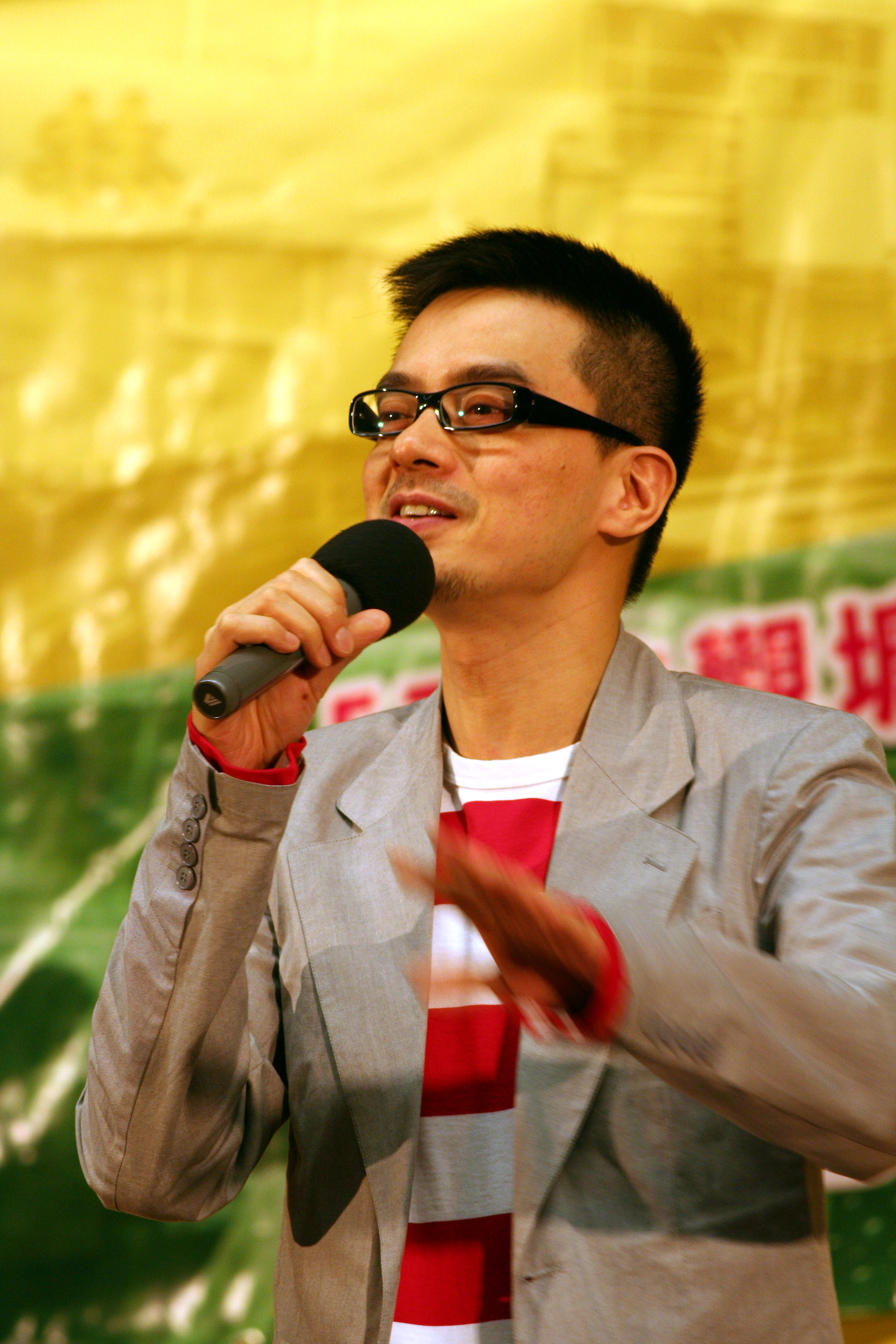
Pop singer Anthony Wong Yiu-ming

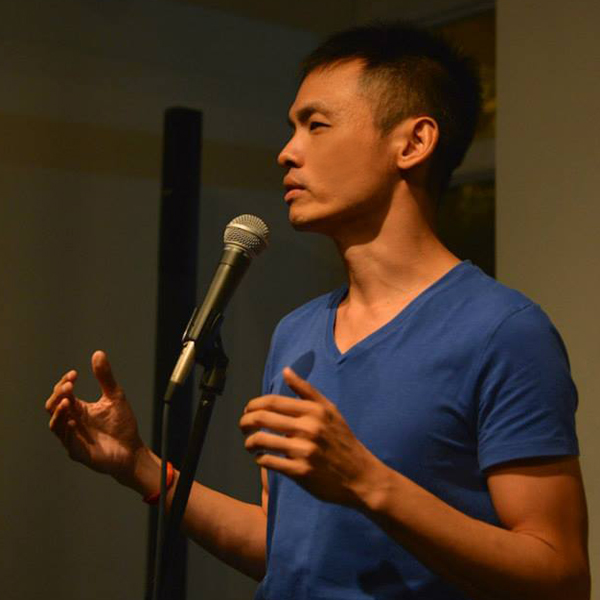
Poet Cyril Wong

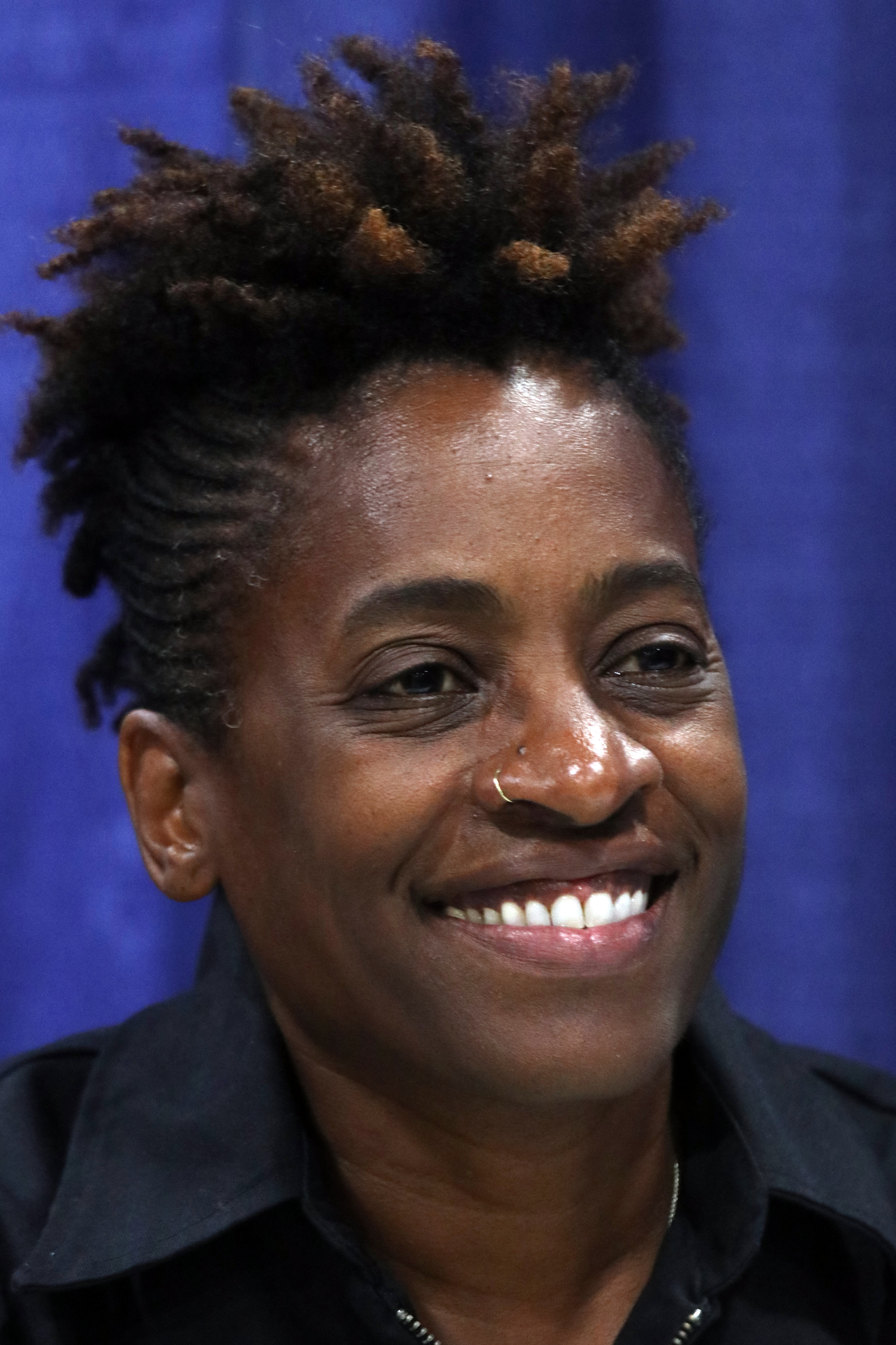
Writer Jacqueline Woodson

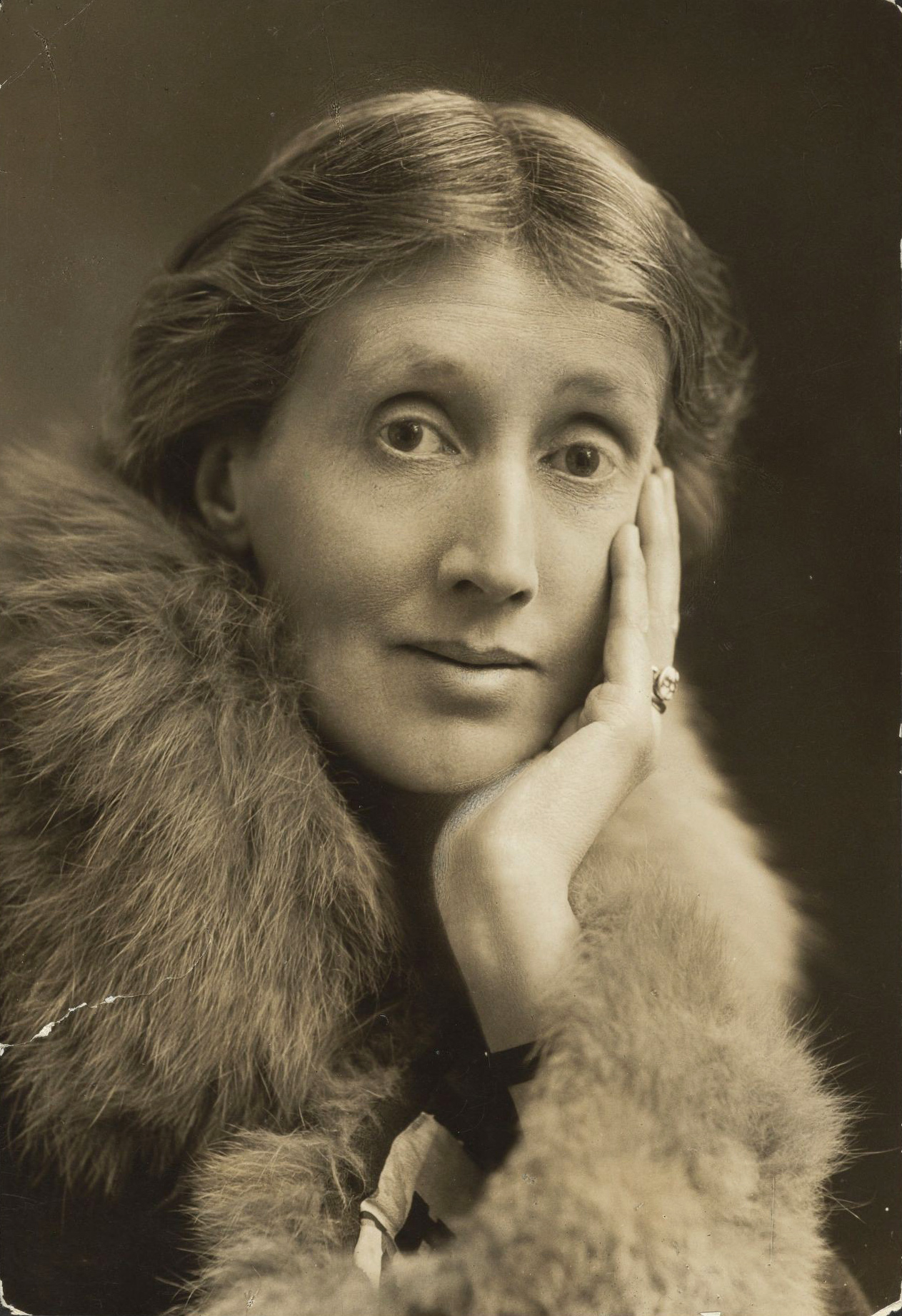
Writer Virginia Woolf

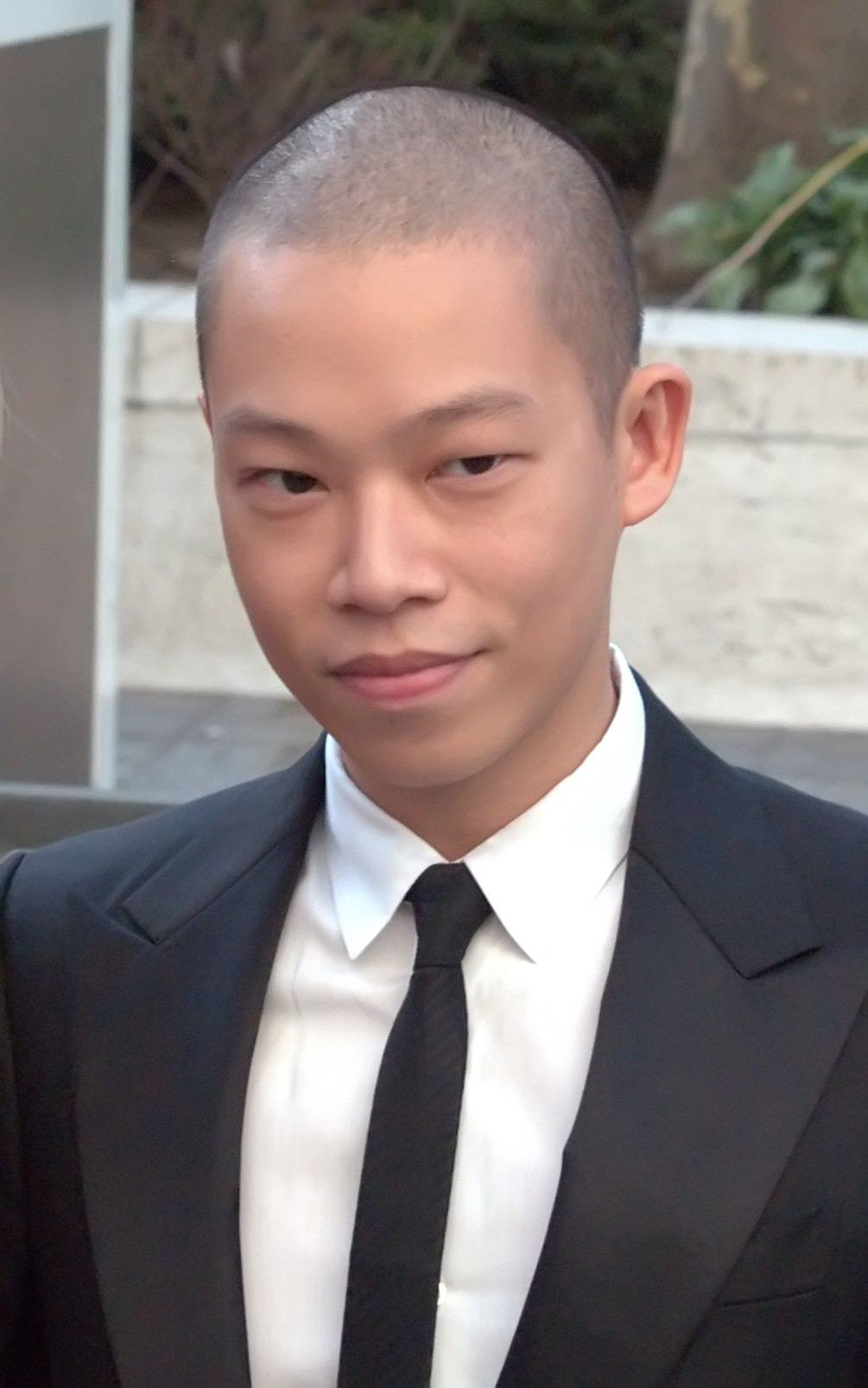
Fashion designer Jason Wu

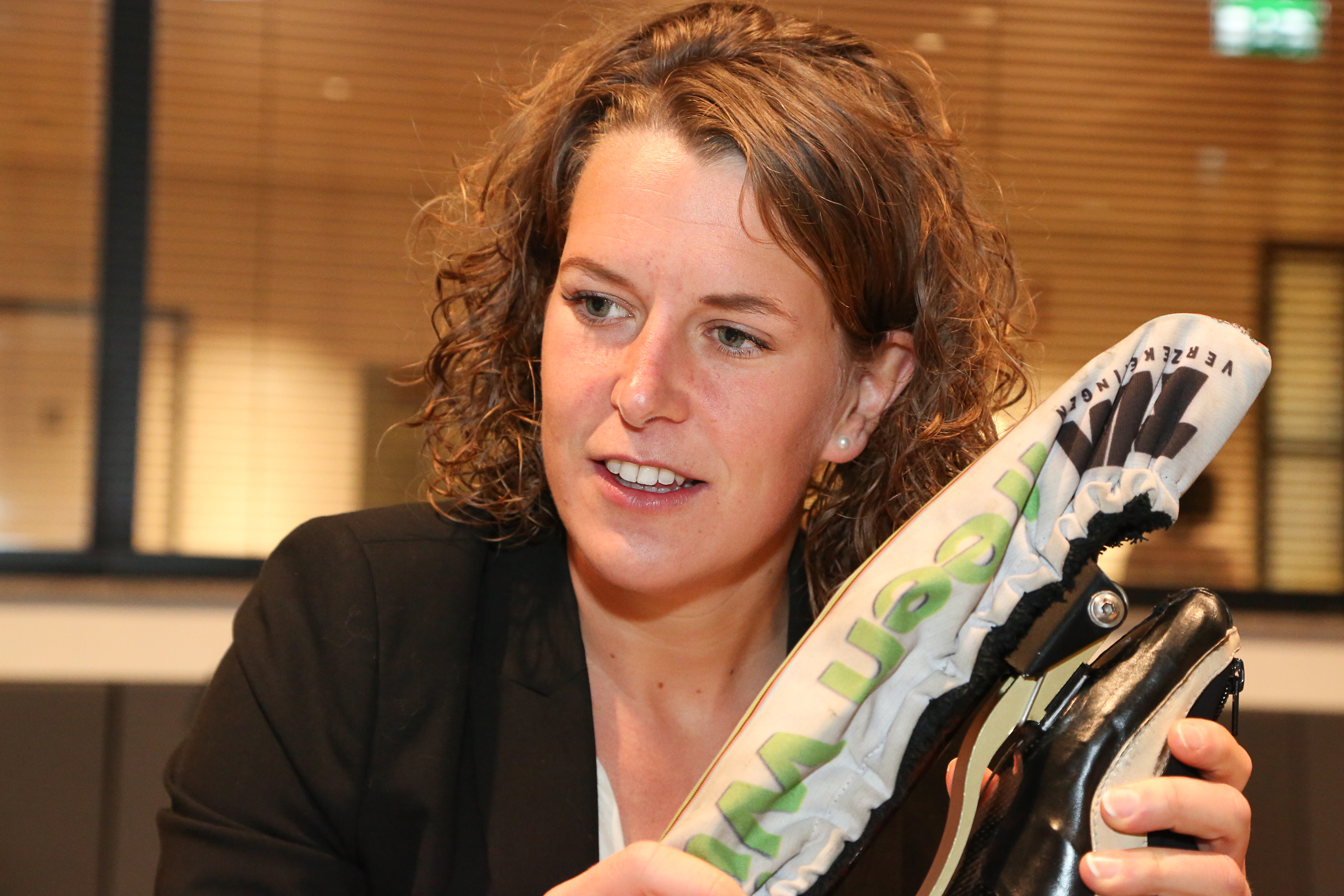
Speed skater Ireen Wüst

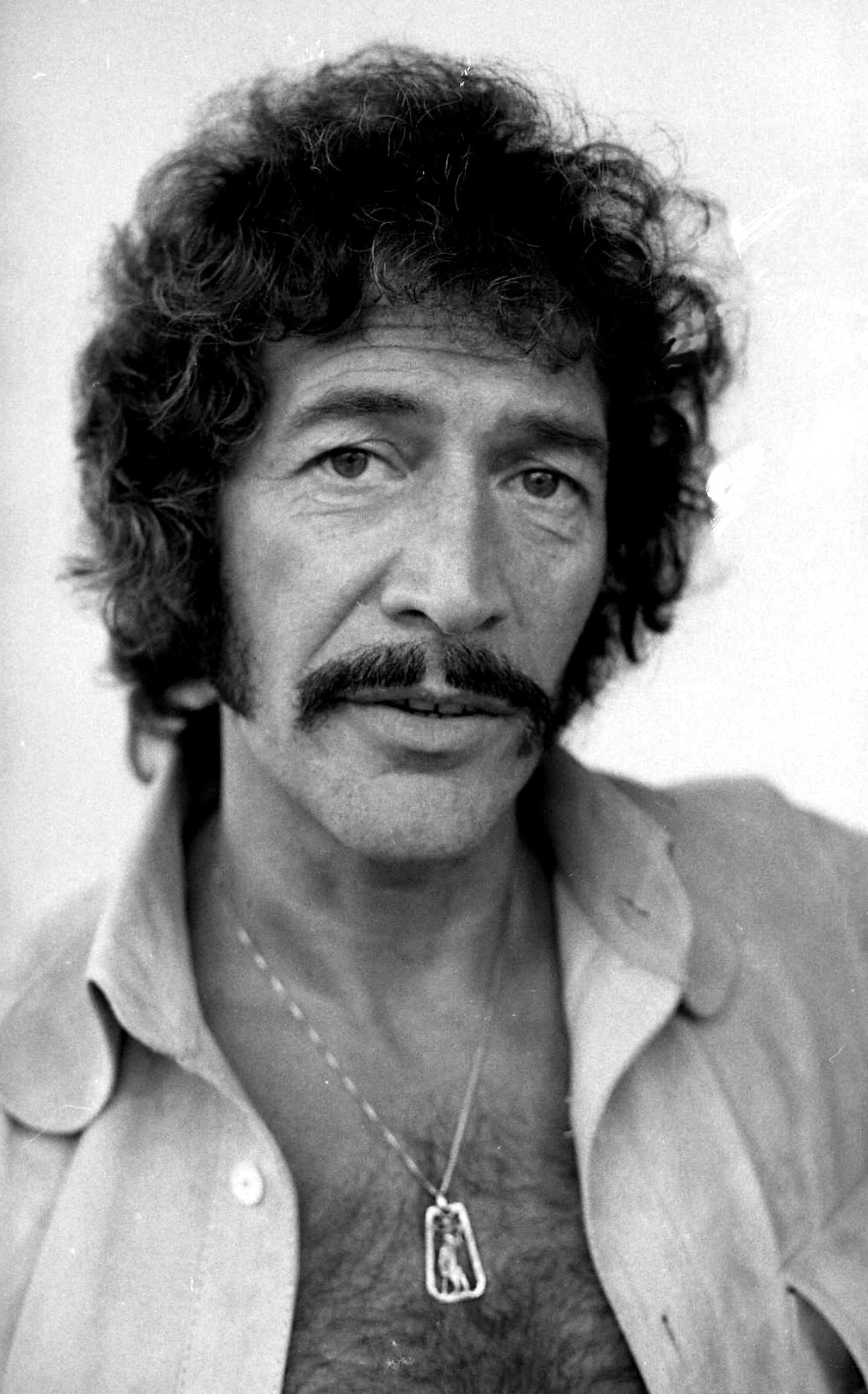
Actor Peter Wyngarde

Name	Lifetime	Nationality	Notable as	Notes
Lana Wachowski	b. 1965	American	Director, screenwriter, producer	L
Joel Wachs	b. 1939	American	Politician	G
Nur Warsame	b. 1984	Somali-Australian	Imam	G
Tom Waddell	1937–1987	American	Athlete, founder of the Gay Games	G
Riyad Vinci Wadia	1967–2003	Indian	Film director	G
Jane Wagner	b. 1935	American	Writer, film director, film producer	L
Siegfried Wagner	1869–1930	German	Classical music composer	B
Sam Wagstaff	1921–1987	American	Art curator, collector	G
Clyde Wahrhaftig	1919–1994	American	Geologist	G
Binyavanga Wainaina	1971–2019	Kenyan	Writer	G
Rufus Wainwright	b. 1973	Canadian	Pop musician	G
Keisha Waites	b. 1972	American	Politician	L
Lena Waithe	b. 1984	American	Actor, writer	L
Dave Wakeling	b. 1956	English	Ska and pop singer, musician (The Beat, General Public)	B
Anton Walbrook	1896–1967	Austrian	Actor	G
Tillie Walden	b. 1996	American	Cartoonist	L
Claire Waldoff	1884–1957	German	Kabarett singer	L
Jerzy Waldorff	1910–1999	Polish	Writer, literary critic	G
Czeslaw Walek	b. 1975	Polish-Czech	Lawyer, LGBT activist	G
Blanka Waleská	1910–1986	Czech	Actor	L
Kira Walkenhorst	b. 1990	German	Beach volleyball player	L
Alice Walker	b. 1944	American	Author, poet	B
Darren Walker	b. 1959	American	Nonprofit executive, lawyer, investment banker	G
Jackie Walker	1950–2002	American	Football player	G
Paul A. Walker	1946–1991	American	Social psychologist	G
Rebecca Walker	b. 1969	American	Author	B
Vaughn R. Walker	b. 1944	American	Federal judge	G
Brady Walkinshaw	b. 1984	American	Politician	G
Louisa Wall	b. 1972	New Zealand	Politician, netball player, rugby player	L
Travis Wall	b. 1987	American	Dancer	G
Ji Wallace	b. 1977	Australian	Trampoline gymnast	G
Yona Wallach	1944–1985	Israeli	Poet	B
Linda Wallem	b. 1961	American	Actor, writer, producer	L
Stephen Wallem	b. 1968	American	Actor	G
John Wallowitch	1926–2007	American	Cabaret performer, songwriter	G
Hugh Walpole	1884–1941	English	Writer	G
Dearbhla Walsh	b. ?	Irish	Director	L
María Elena Walsh	1930–2011	Argentine	Writer, musician	L
Michaela Walsh	b. 1993	Irish	Boxer	L
Michaela Walsh	b. 1998	Irish	Hammer thrower, shotputter	L
Sarah Walsh	b. 1983	Australian	Footballer, sports administrator	L
Tonie Walsh	b. 1960	Irish	LGBT rights activist, DJ	G
Amy Walter	b. 1969	American	Political analyst	L
Charles Walters	1911–1982	American	Director, choreographer	G
Abby Wambach	b. 1980	American	Soccer player	L
John Abdallah Wambere	b. 1973	Ugandan	LGBT rights activist	G
Jeffrey Wammes	b. 1987	Dutch	Gymnast	G
Alex Wan	b. 1967	American	Politician	G
Gok Wan	b. 1974	British	Fashion consultant	G
Alexander Wang	b. 1983	American	Fashion designer	G
Jim Ward	b. 1941	American	Body piercer	G
Ryan Ward	b. 1989	American	Gymnast	G
Sophie Ward	b. 1964	English	Actor	L
Tony Ward	b. 1963	America	Actor, model	B
Marsha Warfield	b. 1954	American	Actor, comedian	L
Andy Warhol	1928–1987	American	Artist	G
Marilyn Waring	b. 1952	New Zealand	Politician, feminist	L
Krzysztof Warlikowski	b. 1962	Polish	Theatre director	G
Sarah Warn	b. ?	American	Writer, editor	L
Jackie Warner	b. 1968	American	Personal trainer, TV personality	L
Michael Warner	b. 1958	American	Writer, Queer theorist	G
David Warren	b. ?	American	Theatre and TV director	G
Patricia Nell Warren	1936–2019	American	Writer	L
Rusty Warren	1930–2021	American	Comedian, singer	L
Tony Warren	b. 1936	English	TV writer	G
Vincent Warren	1938–2017	Canadian	Dance historian	G
Richard Warwick	1945–1997	English	Actor	G
Bryan Washington	b. 1993	American	Writer	G
Haleigh Washington	b. 1995	American	Volleyball player	B
Mary L. Washington	b. 1962	American	Politician	L
Michał Waszyński	1904–1965	Polish	Film director	G
Matthew Waterhouse	b. 1961	English	Actor, writer	G
Rosie Waterland	b. 1986	Australian	Author, TV personality	B
Ethel Waters	1896–1977	American	Jazz musician, actor	B
John Waters	b. 1946	American	Film director	G
Mike Waters	b. 1967	South African	Politician	G
Miriam Van Waters	1887–1974	American	Prison reformer, Feminist social worker	L
Sarah Waters	b. 1966	Welsh	Novelist	L
David Watkin	1925–2008	English	Cinematographer	G
Ian "H" Watkins	b. 1976	Welsh	Pop musician (Steps), actor	G
Perry Watkins	1949–1996	American	Soldier	G
Tuc Watkins	b. 1966	American	Actor	G
David Watmough	1926–2017	Canadian	Novelist, playwright	G
Anthony Watson	b. ?	English	Business and technology executive, activist	G
Benjamin Charles Watson	b. ?	Canadian	Actor	G
Edith Watson	1861–1943	Canadian	Photographer	L
Giz Watson	b. 1957	English-Australian	Politician	L
Jim Watson	b. 1961	Canadian	Politician, first openly gay mayor of Ottawa	G
Kylie Watson	b. 1978	Australian	Actor	L
Harper Watters	b. ?	American	Ballet dancer	G
Danny Watts	b. 1979	English	Racing driver	G
Michael Waugh	b. ?	Australian	Singer–songwriter	G
Ann Wauters	b. 1980	Belgian	Basketball player	L
Chaunté Wayans	b. 1982	American	Comedian, writer, editor	L
Rembert Weakland	b. 1927	American	Roman Catholic Archbishop	G
Lois Weaver	b. 1949	American	Artist, writer, director	L
Scotty Joe Weaver	1986–2004	American	Murder victim	G
Clifton Webb	1889–1966	American	Actor	G
Kathy Webb	b. 1950	American	Politician	L
Lawrence Webb	b. ?	American	Politician, academic administrator	G
Ben Weber	1916–1979	American	Classical composer	G
Bruce Weber	b. 1946	American	Photographer	G
Dreya Weber	b. 1961	American	Actor	B
Rowie Webster	b. 1987	Australian	Water polo player	L
Nancy Wechsler	b. ?	American	Politician	L
Apichatpong Weerasethakul	b. 1970	Thai	Filmmaker	G
Wei Changsheng	1744–1802	Chinese	Qinqiang actor of the Qing dynasty	G
Alice Weidel	b. 1979	German	Politician	L
Mark Weigle	b. 1967	American	Folk-rock musician	G
Ric Weiland	1953–2006	American	Computer software pioneer	G
Karlheinz Weinberger	1921–2006	Swiss	Photographer	G
Randi Weingarten	b. 1957	American	Labor leader, attorney	L
Johnny Weir	b. 1984	American	Figure skater	G
Anna Elisabet Weirauch	1887–1970	German	Author	L
Shatzi Weisberger	1930–2022	American	Nurse, activist	L
Jörn Weisbrodt	b. 1973	German	Arts administrator	G
Kenneth Weishuhn	1997–2012	American	Youth who committed suicide due to anti-gay bullying	G
Bari Weiss	b. 1984	American	Opinion writer, editor	B
Aerlyn Weissman	b. ?	Canadian	Filmmaker	L
Cady Wells	1904–1954	American	Painter	G
John C. Wells	b. 1939	English	Phoneticist, author of the main Esperanto dictionary	G
Lilian Welsh	1858–1938	American	Physician, educator, suffragist, advocate	L
Rick Welts	b. 1953	American	Sports executive	G
Jann Wenner	b. 1946	American	Publisher	G
Joan Werner Laurie	1920–1964	English	Journalist	L
Juliusz Wertheim	1880–1928	Polish	Musician	G
Glenway Wescott	1901–1987	American	Writer	G
Rutina Wesley	b. 1979	American	Actor	B
Crissle West	b. ?	American	Writer, comedian	L
James E. West	1951–2006	American	Politician outed during a sex scandal	G
Rosemary West	b. 1953	English	Serial killer	B
Wash West	b. 1966	American	Director	G
Suzanne Westenhoefer	b. 1961	American	Comedian	L
Guido Westerwelle	1961–2016	German	Politician	G
Frederick Weston	1946–2020	American	Artist	G
John Whaite	b. 1989	English	Baker, television presenter, author	G
James Whale	1889–1957	English	Film director	G
Cheryl Wheeler	b. 1951	American	Singer-songwriter.	L
Jim Wheeler	1978–1997	American	Youth who committed suicide due to anti-gay bullying	G
Monroe Wheeler	1899–1988	American	Publisher, museum coordinator	G
Diane Whipple	1968–2001	American	Lacrosse player	L
Evangeline Marrs Whipple	1855/1857–1930	American	Philanthropist, writer	B
Ben Whishaw	b. 1980	English	Actor	G
Edmund White	1940–2025	American	Novelist, teacher	G
Jean White	1940–2010	English	Clergy	L
Mel White	b. 1940	American	Clergy, writer	G
Mike White	b. 1970	American	Screenwriter, actor	B
Minor White	1908–1976	American	Photographer	G
Patrick White	1912–1990	Australian	Author	G
T. H. White	1906–1964	English	Author	G
Charles Whitebread	1943–2008	American	Legal scholar	G
Annie Whitehead	b. 1955	English	Jazz musician	L
William Whitehead	b. 1931	Canadian	Writer	G
James B. Whiteside	b. ?	American	Ballet dancer	G
Walt Whitman	1819–1892	American	Writer	G
George Whitmore	1946–1989	American	Writer	G
David Whitney	1939–2005	American	Art curator, collector, gallerist, critic	G
Jeff Whittington	1985–1999	New Zealand	Murder victim	G
Jeff Whitty	b. 1971	American	Playwright	G
Betty Who	b. 1991	Australian-American	Singer-songwriter	B
Randy Wicker	b. 1938	American	Author, activist, blogger, archivist	G
Vicki Wickham	b. 1939	English	Talent manager, entertainment producer, songwriter	L
Dil Wickremasinghe	b. 1973	Italian-Sri Lankan	Journalist	L
Sue Wicks	b. 1966	American	Basketball player	L
Wilhelm Wieben	b. 1935	German	TV news presenter	G
Jane Wiedlin	b. 1958	American	Pop musician (The Go-Go's)	B
Scott Wiener	b. 1970	American	Politician	G
John Wieners	1934–2002	American	Beat poet	G
Josephine Wiggs	b. 1963	American	Bass guitarist (The Perfect Disaster, The Breeders)	L
Rebecca Wight	1959–1988	American	Murder victim	L
Vincent Wijeysingha	b. 1970	Singaporean	Academic, activist, politician	G
Joop Wijn	b. 1969	Dutch	Politician	G
Marieke Wijsman	b. 1975	Dutch	Speed skater	L
Will Wikle	b. 1978	American	Reality show contestant	G
Rosie Wilby	b. 1970	English	Stand-up comedian	L
Richie Wilcox	b. 1980	Canadian	Singer, reality show contestant	G
Jessica Wild	b. 1980	Puerto Rican	Drag queen, reality TV personality	G
Dolly Wilde	1895–1941	English	Socialite	L
Oscar Wilde	1854–1900	Irish	Playwright, poet, novelist	B
Winston Wilde	b. ?	American	Sexologist, author	G
Peter Wildeblood	1923–1999	British-Canadian	Journalist	G
Thornton Wilder	1897–1975	American	Playwright, novelist	G
Kehinde Wiley	b. 1977	American	Portrait painter	G
Samira Wiley	b. 1987	American	Actor	L
Matthew Wilkas	b. 1978	American	Actor, playwright	G
Edith Lake Wilkinson	1868–1957	American	Artist	L
Hannah Wilkinson	b. 1992	New Zealand	Footballer	L
Leah Wilkinson	b. 1986	Welsh	Field hockey player	L
Anne Will	b. 1966	German	TV journalist	L
Clara Willdenow	1856–1931	German	Physician	L
Michael Willhoite	b. 1946	American	Artist, writer	G
William II of the Netherlands	1792–1849	Dutch	King of the Netherlands, Grand Duke of Luxembourg, and Duke of Limburg	B
Michael J. Willett	b. 1989	American	Actor	G
Derek Williams	b. 1952	New Zealand	Composer, arranger, conductor	G
Edith Williams	1899–1979	Canadian	Veterinarian	L
Ellen Dinalo Williams	b. ?	American	Actor	L
Emily Williams	1869–1942	American	Architect	L
Emlyn Williams	1905–1987	Welsh	Writer, dramatist, actor	B
Kenneth Williams	1926–1988	English	Comedian, raconteur	G
Layton Williams	b. 1994	English	Actor, singer, dancer	G
Leighton Alexander Williams	b. ?	Canadian	actor, playwright	Q
Nathan Hale Williams	b. 1976	American	Film and TV producer, actor	G
Pete Williams	b. 1952	American	News correspondent, politician	G
Rachel Williams	b. 1967	American	Model, TV presenter	B
Roger Ross Williams	b. 1970	American	Film director	G
Sharni Williams	b. 1988	Australian	Rugby player	L
Stephen Williams	b. 1966	Welsh	Politician	G
Tennessee Williams	1911–1983	American	Playwright	G
Thomas Lyle Williams	1896–1976	American	Businessman, founder of Maybelline cosmetics	G
Zelda Williams	b. 1989	American	Actor, director, producer, writer	B
Cris Williamson	b. 1947	American	Folk-rock musician	L
Kevin Williamson	b. 1965	American	Screenwriter, film director	G
Kit Williamson	b. 1985	American	Actor	G
Malcolm Williamson	1931–2003	Australian	Classical composer	G
Matthew Williamson	b. 1971	English	Fashion designer	G
Allee Willis	1947–2019	American	Songwriter	L
Emma Willmann	b. 1985	American	Comedian	L
Ajita Wilson	1957–1987	American	Actor	L
Alexander Wilson	1953–1993	Canadian	Writer, horticulturalist	G
Angus Wilson	1913–1991	English	Novelist	G
Avery Wilson	b. 1995	American	Singer, songwriter, dancer	B
Claire Wilson	b. ?	American	Politician	L
David Wilson	b. 1966	Canadian	Figure skater, choreographer	G
Hank Wilson	1947–2008	American	LGBT rights activist	G
Jacqueline Wilson	b. 1945	English	Novelist	L
Jonathan Wilson	b. 1963	Canadian	actor, playwright	G
Kaia Wilson	b. 1974	American	Punk rock musician (Team Dresch, The Butchies)	L
Lanford Wilson	b. 1937	American	Playwright	G
Mara Wilson	b. 1987	American	Actor	B
Matthew Wilson	b. 1984	American	Politician	G
Nancy Wilson	b. 1950	American	Clergy	L
Phill Wilson	b. 1956	American	Activist	G
Rebel Wilson	b. 1980	Australian	Actress and comedian	B
Richard Wilson	b. 1936	Scottish	Actor, theatre director	G
Ricky Wilson	1953–1985	American	Rock musician (The B-52's)	G
Robert Wilson	1941–2025	American	Experimental theater director and playwright	G
Sophie Wilson	b. 1957	English	Computer scientist	L
Tim Wilson	b. 1980	Australian	Politician	G
Todd Wilson	1963–2005	American	Film director	G
Johann Joachim Winckelmann	1717–1768	German	Art historian, archeologist	G
Gabby Windey	b. 1991	American	TV personality	B
Donald Windham	1920–2010	American	Novelist, memoirist	G
Edith Windsor	1929–2017	American	Activist, Plaintiff in United States v. Windsor	L
Robin Windsor	1979–2024	English	Dancer	G
Sherwin Wine	1928–2007	American	Rabbi	G
Paul Winfield	1939–2004	American	Actor	G
Mary Wings	1949–2024	American	Writer, artist	L
Josef Winkler	b. 1953	Austrian	Writer	G
Christa Winsloe	1888–1944	German-Hungarian	Novelist, playwright	B
Jeanette Winterson	b. 1958	English	Author	L
Dale Winton	1955–2018	English	DJ, TV presenter	G
Lucian Wintrich	b. 1988	American	Writer, pundit, visual artist	G
Aline Wirley	b. 1981	Brazilian	Actor, singer-songwriter	B
Mary Wiseman	b. 1961	American	Judge	L
Avi Wisnia	b. 1982	American	Singer, musician	G
Harriet Wistrich	b. 1960	English	Solicitor, feminist	L
Michał Witkowski	b. 1975	Polish	Author	G
Scott Wittman	b. 1955	American	Musical theater lyricist, director	G
Ludwig Wittgenstein	1889–1951	Austrian	Philosopher	B
Monique Wittig	1935–2003	French	Author, philosopher, feminist theorist	L
Chris Witty	b. 1975	American	Speed skater, racing cyclist	L
David Wojnarowicz	1954–1992	American	Artist	G
John Wojtowicz	1945–2006	American	Bank robber	G
Patricia Wolf	b. 1974	Uruguayan	TV personality, actor, model	B
Patrick Wolf	b. 1983	English	Singer-songwriter	G
Lara Wolf	b. 2000	Austrian	Freestyle skier	L
Remi Wolf	b. 1996	American	Singer	B
Elsie de Wolfe	1865–1950	American	Interior designer	B
George C. Wolfe	b. 1954	American	Playwright, director	G
Jack Wolfe	b. ?	English	Actor	G
Jenna Wolfe	b. 1974	American	Journalist	L
Mike Wolfe	b. ?	English	Politician	G
Jeremy Wolfenden	1934–1965	English	Spy	G
Karin Wolff	b. 1959	German	Politician	L
Michelle Wolff	b. ?	American	Actor	L
Rikard Wolff	b. 1958	Swedish	Actor, singer	G
Tobias Barrington Wolff	b. 1970	American	Lawyer, professor	G
Evan Wolfson	b. 1957	American	Attorney	G
Terry Wolverton	b. 1954	American	Writer	L
Anthony Wong	b. 1962	Hong Kong	Pop singer (Tat Ming Pair)	G
Anthony Brandon Wong	b. 1965	Australian	Actor	G
B.D. Wong	b. 1960	American	Actor	G
Chantale Wong	b. ?	American	U.S. Director of the Asian Development Bank	L
Cyril Wong	b. 1977	Singaporean	Poet	G
Fernando Wong	b. ?	Panamanian	Landscape designer	G
Kaisik Wong	1950–1990	American	Fashion designer	G
Martin Wong	1946–1999	American	Artist	G
Norman Wong	b. ?	American	Writer	G
Penny Wong	b. 1968	Australian	Politician	L
Suzie Wong	b. 1955	Hong Kong	TV personality, DJ	L
Tobi Wong	1974–2010	Canadian	Artist	G
Kristyn Wong-Tam	b. 1972	Canadian	Politician	L
Merle Woo	b. 1941	American	Poet, activist	L
Ronnie Woo	b. 1985	American	Chef, TV personality, author, model	G
Cathy Wood	b. 1963	American	Serial killer	L
Evan Rachel Wood	b. 1987	American	Actor, singer	B
Grant Wood	1891–1942	American	Artist	G
Jason Wood	1972–2010	English	Comedian	G
Thelma Wood	1901–1970	American	Sculptor	L
Charles Woodcock	1850–1923	American	Lover of King Karl I of Württemberg	G
Fabian S. Woodley	1888–1957	English	Uranian poet	G
Portia Woodman	b. 1991	New Zealand	Rugby union player	L
Marnie Woodrow	b. 1969	Canadian	Writer	L
Gia Woods	b. 1996	American	Pop singer	L
Gregory Woods	b. 1953	English	Writer	G
Mark Kenneth Woods	b. 1977	Canadian	Writer, actor, director	G
Simon Woods	b. 1980	English	Actor	G
Jacqueline Woodson	b. 1963	American	Writer	L
Ellen Woodsworth	b. ?	Canadian	Politician	L
Jack Woolley	b. 1998	Irish	Taekwondo athlete	G
Monty Woolley	1888–1963	American	Actor	G
James Woolf	1920–1966	English	Film producer	G
Virginia Woolf	1882–1941	English	Writer	B
Dan Wootton	b. 1983	New Zealand-British	Journalist, TV personality	G
Kate Worley	1958–2004	American	Comic book writer	B
Klaus Wowereit	b. 1953	German	Politician	G
Wrabel	b. 1989	American	Musician, singer, songwriter	G
Nigel Wrench	b. 1960	English-South African	Radio personality, journalist	G
Chely Wright	b. 1970	American	Country music singer-songwriter	L
Douglas Wright	b. 1956	New Zealand	Dancer, choreographer	G
Suzanne Wright	b. 1968	American	Artist	L
Tyler Wright	b. 1994	Australian	Surfer	B
William Wright	1930–2016	American	Author, editor, playwright	G
Alice Wu	b. 1970	American	Film director, screenwriter	L
Jason Wu	b. 1982	Taiwanese-Canadian	Fashion designer	G
Charles Wuorinen	1938–2020	American	Classical music composer	G
Aileen Wuornos	1956–2002	American	Serial killer	B
Conchita Wurst	b. 1988	Austrian	Singer	G
Ireen Wüst	b. 1986	Dutch	Speed skater	B
Janine van Wyk	b. 1987	South African	Footballer	L
Florence Wyle	1881–1968	American-Canadian	Sculptor	L
Christopher Wylie	b. 1989	Canadian	Data consultant	G
Jean Wyllys	b. 1974	Brazilian	Lecturer, journalist, politician	G
Peter Wyngarde	1927–2018	British	Actor	G
Kathleen Wynne	b. 1953	Canadian	Politician and Canada's first openly gay premier	L
Danny Lee Wynter	b. 1982	British	Actor, writer, activist	G

A · Ba–Bh · Bi–Bz · C · D · E · F · G · H · I · J · K · L · M · N · O
P · Q · R · Sa–Sc · Sd–Si · Sj–Sz · T · U · V · W · X · Y · Z

== X ==
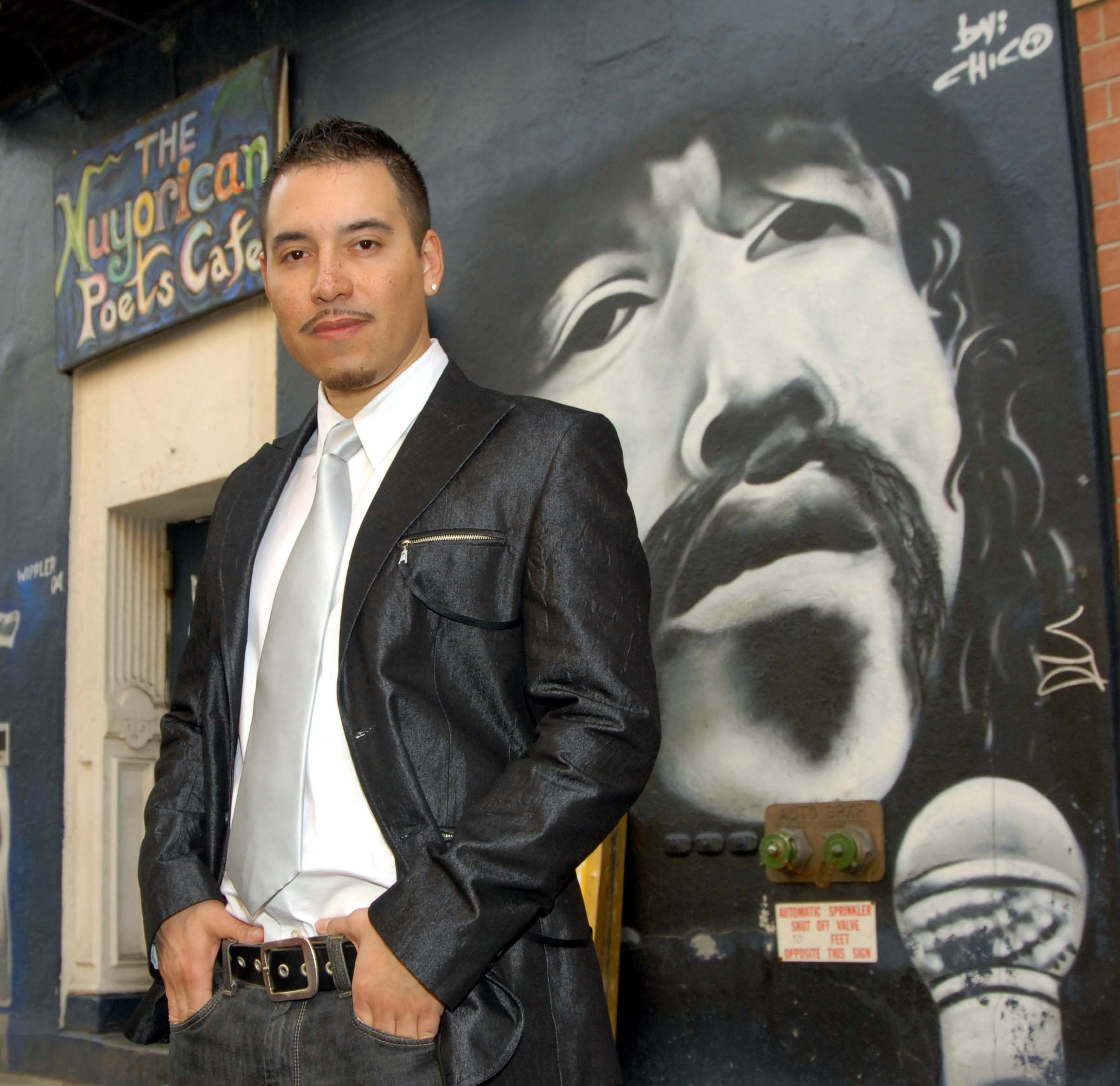
Poet, spoken word artist, novelist and activist Emanuel Xavier

Name	Lifetime	Nationality	Notable as	Notes
Marta Xargay	b. 1990	Spanish	Basketball player	L
Emanuel Xavier	b. 1971	American	Poet, spoken word artist, activist	G
Chris Xefos	b. 1964	American	Rock musician (King Missile)	G
Xi Kang	223–262 CE	Chinese	Writer	G
Xian	b. ?	Chinese	LGBT activist	L
Xiaomingxiong	b. circa 1954	Hong Kong	Activist	G
Xiyadie	b. 1963	Chinese	Artist	G
Emperor Xizong of Tang	862–888 CE	Chinese (Tang dynasty)	Head of state	G
Xuân Diệu	1916–1985	Vietnamese	Poet	G

A · Ba–Bh · Bi–Bz · C · D · E · F · G · H · I · J · K · L · M · N · O
P · Q · R · Sa–Sc · Sd–Si · Sj–Sz · T · U · V · W · X · Y · Z

== Y ==
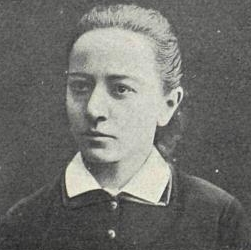
Writer, lawyer and literary editor Anna Yevreinova

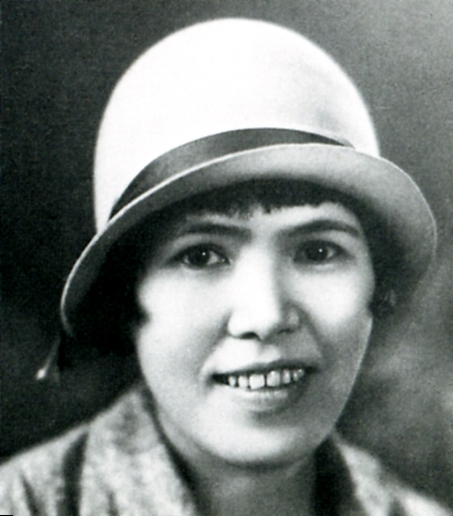
Novelist Nobuko Yoshiya

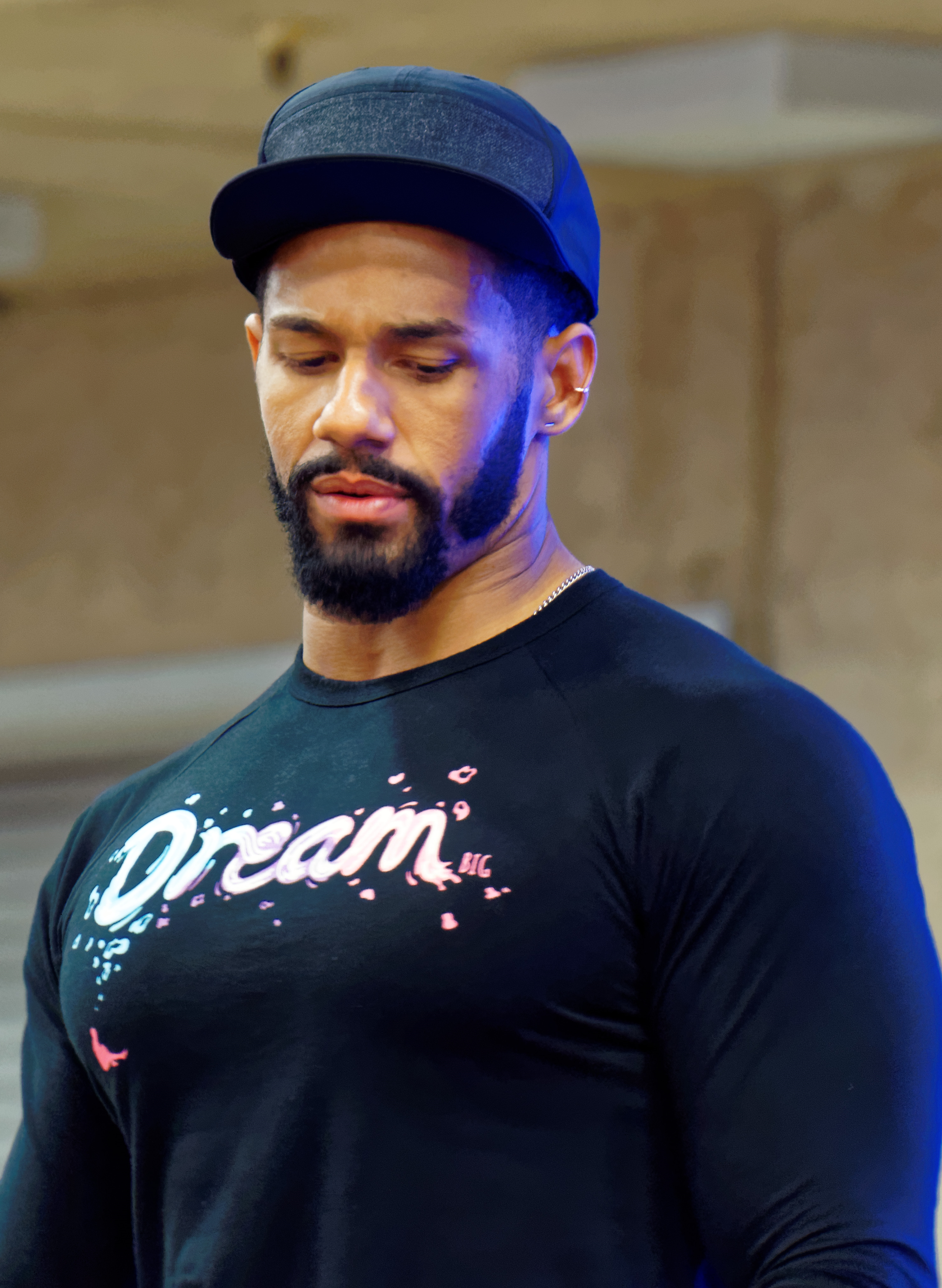
Professional wrestler Darren Young

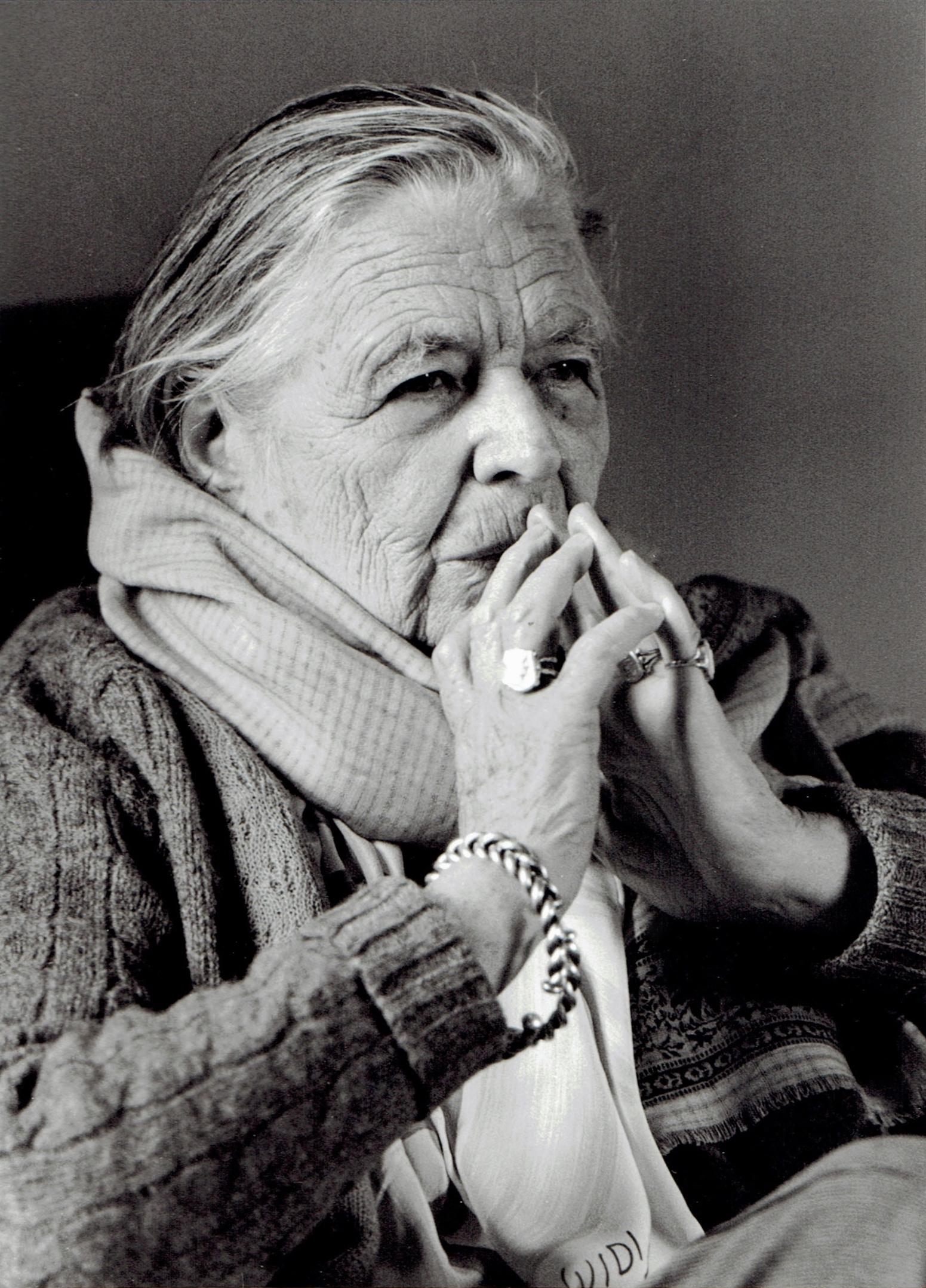
Novelist and essayist Marguerite Yourcenar

Name	Lifetime	Nationality	Notable as	Notes
Varvara Yakovleva	1884–1941	Russian	Cheka officer, politician, first female finance minister	B
Kirsty Yallop	b. 1987	New Zealand	Footballer	L
Tameka Yallop	b. 1991	Australian	Footballer	L
Mia Yamamoto	b. 1943	American	Attorney	L
Yan Xing	b. 1986	Chinese	Artist	G
Staci Michelle Yandle	b. 1961	American	Judge of the U.S. District Court	L
Rómulo Yanes	1959–2021	Cuban-American	Photographer	G
Bowen Yang	b. 1990	American	Writer, comedian, actor	G
Eugene Lee Yang	b. 1986	American	Comedic performer, writer, director, internet personality	G
John Yang	b. 1958	American	News correspondent, commentator	G
Olive Yang	1927–2017	Burmese	Drug trafficker	B
Hen Yanni	b. 1983	Israeli	Actor, model, musician	B
Yan María Yaoyólotl Castro	b. 1952	Mexican	Lesbian feminist activist, artist, painter, curator and cultural promoter	L
Gina Yashere	b. 1974	British	Comedian	L
Yasmine	1972–2009	Belgian	Singer, broadcaster	L
William Yate	1802–1877	New Zealand	Missionary, writer	G
Mary Ann Yates	1728–1787	English	Actor	B
Tamotsu Yatō	1928–1973	Japanese	Photographer	G
Nicholas Yatromanolakis	b. 1975	Greek	Politician, political scientist	G
Ken Yeager	b. 1952	American	Politician	G
Yeho	b. 1977	Israeli	Singer, actor	G
Yemi A.D.	b. 1981	Czech	Choreographer	G
Ray Yeung	b. ?	Hong Kong	Filmmaker	G
Anna Yevreinova	1844–1919	Russian	Writer, feminist and 1st female in Russia to obtain a Juris Doctor degree	L
Chay Yew	b. ?	Singaporean-American	Playwright and stage director	G
Vern Yip	b. 1968	American	Interior designer, TV personality	G
Ng Yi-Sheng	b. 1980	Singaporean	Poet	G
Milo Yiannopoulos	b. 1983	English	Polemicist, political commentator, public speaker, writer	G
Sam Yingling	b. 1980	American	Politician	G
Y-Love	b. 1978	American	Hip-hop artist	G
Jwan Yosef	b. 1984	Syrian-Swedish	Painter, artist	G
Ron Yosef	b. 1974	Israeli	Rabbi, LGBT rights activist	G
Kenji Yoshino	b. 1969	Japanese-American	Legal scholar, author, activist	G
Nobuko Yoshiya	1914–1973	Japanese	Novelist	L
David Yost	b. 1969	American	Actor	G
Young M.A	b. 1992	American	Rapper	L
Austin Young	b. 1966	American	Photographer	G
Craig Robert Young	b. 1976	English	Actor	G
Darren Young	b. 1979	American	Professional wrestler, first WWE performer to disclose that he is gay while still active with the company	G
David Young	b. ?	American	Judge, TV personality	G
Lola Young	b. 2001	English	Singer-songwriter	B
Nico Young	b. 2002	American	Distance runner	G
Tracy Young	b. 1970	American	DJ, producer, remixer, composer	L
Will Young	b. 1979	English	Pop musician, actor	G
Blake Young-Fountain	b. 1981	American	Actor, model, producer	G
Jaboukie Young-White	b. 1994	American	Comedian, writer	G
Caine Youngman	b. ?	Botswanan	Human rights activist	G
Jenny Owen Youngs	b. 1981	American	Folk musician	L
Marguerite Yourcenar	1903–1987	Belgian-French-American	Author	L
Mary Yu	b. 1957	American	Associate Justice of the Washington Supreme Court	L
Yu Xin	512–581 CE	Chinese	Poet	B
Yuan Mei	1716–1797	Chinese	Painter, poet	G
Lidia Yuknavitch	b. 1963	American	Writer	B
Yun Hyon-seok	1984–2003	South Korean	Poet, writer, LGBT activist	G

A · Ba–Bh · Bi–Bz · C · D · E · F · G · H · I · J · K · L · M · N · O
P · Q · R · Sa–Sc · Sd–Si · Sj–Sz · T · U · V · W · X · Y · Z

== Z ==
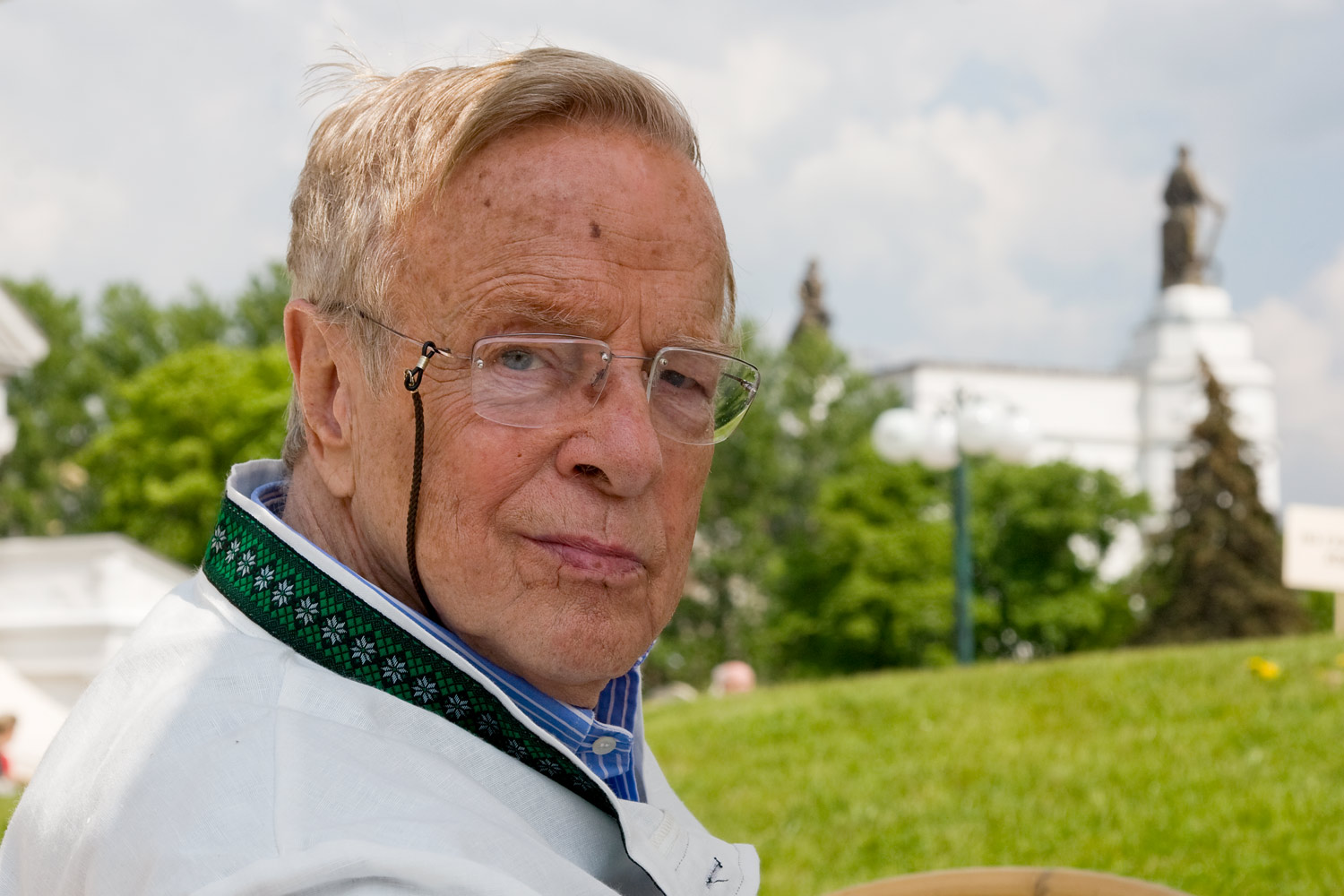
Film director, producer and politician Franco Zeffirelli

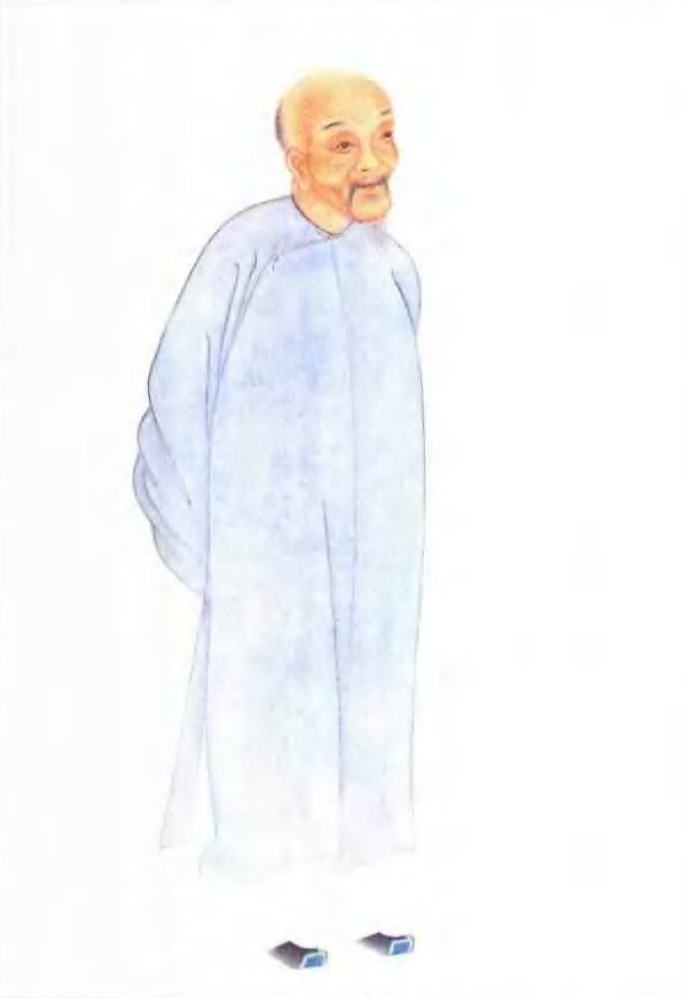
Calligrapher, painter and poet Zheng Xie

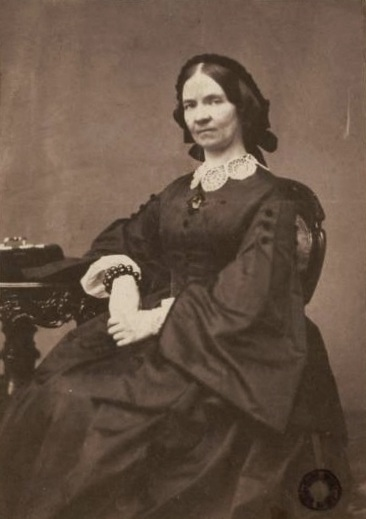
Novelist and poet Narcyza Żmichowska

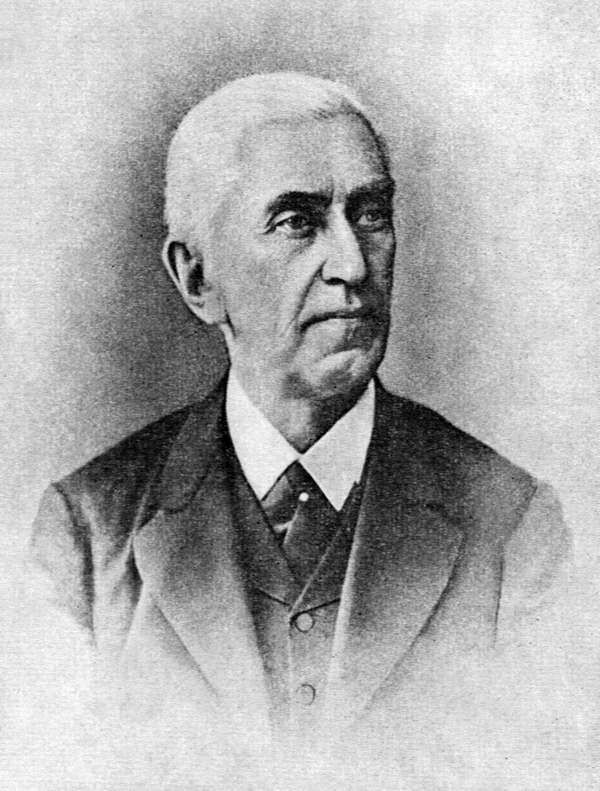
Pianist Nikolai Zverev

Name	Lifetime	Nationality	Notable as	Notes
Romas Zabarauskas	b. 1990	Lithuanian	Film director, screenwriter, producer	G
Natalia Zabiiako	b. 1994	Russian	Pair skater	L
Craig Zadan	b. 1949	American	Film producer, director	G
Ludovic-Mohamed Zahed	b. 1977	Algerian-French	Imam	G
Hamid Zaher	b. 1974	Afghan	Writer, LGBT activist	G
Luis Alegre Zahonero	b. 1977	Spanish	Politician, philosopher, writer	G
Paul Zaloom	b. 1951	American	Actor, puppeteer	G
Sasheer Zamata	b. 1986	American	Actor, comedian	L
Natalia Zamilska	b. 1989	Polish	DJ, composer, music producer	L
Yuval Zamir	1963–2011	Israeli	Actor, singer, writer, theatre director	G
Pedro Zamora	1972–1994	Cuban-American	AIDS activist, TV personality	G
Daniel Zamudio	1987–2012	Chilean	Hate crime victim	G
Ana Zanatti	b. 1949	Portuguese	TV presenter, actor, writer	L
Darin Zanyar	b. 1987	Swedish	Singer-songwriter	G
Luis Zapata	b. 1951	Mexican	Author	G
James Zappalorti	1945–1990	American	Murder victim	G
Katherine Zappone	b. 1953	American-Irish	Politician	L
Tati Zaqui	b. 1994	Brazilian	Singer-songwriter and dancer	B
Eve Zaremba	1930–2025	Polish-Canadian	Author	L
Michelle Zauner	b. 1989	American	Musician (Little Big League, Japanese Breakfast), director, author	B
Jerzy Zawieyski	1902–1969	Polish	Writer, political activist	G
Waldemar Zboralski	b. 1960	Polish	LGBT activist, journalist, politician	G
Rick Zbur	b. 1957	American	Lawyer, LGBT activist, environmentalist	G
Zebra Katz	b. ?	American	Musician, performance artist	G
Fiona Zedde	b. 1976	Jamaican-American	Writer	L
Joe Zee	b. 1968	Hong Kong-Canadian	Fashion stylist, journalist, producer	G
Franco Zeffirelli	1923–2019	Italian	Film and theater director	G
Sande Zeig	b. ?	American	Film director	L
Cyd Zeigler	b. ?	American	Commentator, author	G
Kenneth Zeller	1945–1985	Canadian	Murder victim	G
Nahum B. Zenil	b. 1947	Mexican	Artist	G
Julius Zeyer	1841–1901	Czech	Prose writer, poet, playwright	G
Zheng Xie	1693–1765	Chinese	Calligrapher, painter, poet	G
Zhou Dan	b. 1974	Chinese	Lawyer, LGBT rights activist	G
Helen Zia	b. 1952	American	Writer, journalist, activist	L
Oscar Zia	b. 1996	Swedish	Pop singer	G
Alexander Ziegler	1944–1987	Swiss	Author, actor	G
Rokas Žilinskas	1972–2017	Lithuanian	Politician, journalist	G
Katarzyna Zillman	b. 1995	Polish	Rower	L
Richard Zimler	b. 1956	American-Portuguese	Writer	G
Bonnie Zimmerman	b. 1947	American	Literary critic, feminist scholar	L
Piotr Zioła	b. 1995	Polish	Rock singer	G
Luisa Zissman	b. 1987	English	Entrepreneur, reality TV contestant, TV personality	B
Narcyza Żmichowska	1819–1876	Polish	Novelist, poet, feminist	L
Zolita	b. 1994	American	Singer	L
George Zoritch	1917–2009	Russian-American	Ballet dancer	G
Mark Richard Zubro	b. 1948	American	Mystery writer	G
Hélène van Zuylen	1863–1947	French	Aristocrat, socialite, writer, sports figure	L
Jan Zrzavý	1890–1977	Czech	Painter, artist, illustrator	G
Anna Maria Żukowska	b. 1983	Polish	Politician, jurist	B
León Zuleta	1952–1993	Colombian	Writer, philosopher, LGBT rights activist	G
William Zulock	b. 1989	American	Criminal	G
Zachary Zulock	b. 1987	American	Criminal	G
Nikolai Zverev	1832–1893	Russian	Pianist	G
Mikhail Zygar	b. 1981	Russian	Journalist, writer, filmmaker	G

A · Ba–Bh · Bi–Bz · C · D · E · F · G · H · I · J · K · L · M · N · O
P · Q · R · Sa–Sc · Sd–Si · Sj–Sz · T · U · V · W · X · Y · Z

== See also ==
- List of gay, lesbian or bisexual people
