= Karlheinz Weinberger =

Swiss photographer (1921–2006)

- Born: 10 June 1921; Zürich, Switzerland
- Died: 10 December 2006 (aged 85); Zürich, Switzerland
- Website: https://karlheinzweinberger.ch/

Karlheinz Weinberger (10 June 1921 – 10 December 2006) was a Swiss photographer, known for his homoerotic portraits of rebellious young men.

== Life ==
Karlheinz Weinberger was born in 1921 in Zürich. He attended the literature high school there and began to teach himself photography. After the end of the Second World War, he temporarily worked as a furniture and carpet salesman, but was also unemployed for a long time. From 1955 until his retirement in 1986 he was a warehouse clerk at Siemens-Albis in Zürich. He lived all his life at the same address in Zürich urban district. Karlheinz Weinberger died in 2006.

== Career ==
Karlheinz Weinberger was a self-taught photographer spending over sixty years producing intimate, often homoerotic photographs of rebellious male youth, mostly working-class men. Weinberger worked in the warehouse at Zürich's Siemens factory during the day and his nights he spent shooting portraits of construction workers, bikers, and athletes for the underground gay journal Der Kreis. Weinberger published his works under the pseudonym Jim. In 1958 he began focusing his camera on the Halbstarken, an edgy, antiauthoritarian teen subculture whose members styled themselves as bad boys à la James Dean in Rebel Without a Cause or Elvis Presley.

=== Work ===
As early as 1948, Weinberger made contact with the gay magazine Der Kreis, where he used the pseudonym “Jim”. At the parties of the district subscribers, he showed off his musical talent and was the “house photographer”. From September 1952 to 1965 his photographs were an integral part of the circle. With around 80 photos published, he had a significant impact on homosexual aesthetics until the end of the magazine in 1967 and its successor magazine Club68. The photographs, which Weinberger published under the pseudonym “Jim”, mainly show workers and evoke the homoeroticism of simple men.

From 1958 Weinberger began photographing the hooligan scene in Zürich. He was also interested in rockers and tattooed people. Weinberger was one of the first photographers to get permission to document the Hells Angels' local offshoot. Between 1964 and 1976 Weinberger also worked as a freelancer for various sports magazines and specialized in sports reports.

Weinberger took part in various group exhibitions in Zürich, Italy, Israel, Canada and the USA. The photo gallery of the Migros Club School in Zürich showed a first solo exhibition in 1980 under the title "The hooligans 1955-1960: 25 years ago, when Zürich became hooligans". His homoerotic photographs were presented to a wider audience for the first time in 2000 in the exhibition “Half-strong: Photographs by Karlheinz Weinberger” at the Zürich Museum of Design, and his pseudonym was dissolved.

Weinberger has taken part in various international photo competitions since 1963 and in 1968 won a prize in the "50 years of NIVON Holland" competition.

Weinberger's estate is kept in the Swiss Social Archives in Zürich.

== Solo exhibitions ==
- 2019: Karlheinz Weinberger, Kornhausforum, Bern
- 2018: Karlheinz Weinberger or the Ballad by Jim, Photobastei, Zürich
- 2017: Karlheinz Weinberger, Photofestival Mérignac, France
- 2017: Karlheinz Weinberger, Photo Espagna, Madrid
- 2017: Swiss Rebels, Rencontres d'Arles, France
- 2014: Portraits 1962 - 1986, Maccarone, New York
- 2013: Karlheinz Weinberger, Solo project by Rod Bianco Gallery, Oslo at Untitled, Miami Beach
- 2012: Karlheinz Weinberger, Marc Oliver, Zürich
- 2012: Intimate Stranger, Kunstmuseum Basel / Museum of Contemporary Art, Basel
- 2011: Intimate Stranger, Presentation House Gallery, Vancouver
- 2011: Intimate Stranger, The Swiss Institute Contemporary Art, New York / Anna Kustera Gallery, New York
- 2011: Thugs to Bikers, in Color, Anna Kustera Gallery, New York
- 2011: Rebels, gallery cubus-m, Berlin
- 2011: Rebels, Musée Nicephore Niépce, Chalon-sur-Saône, France
- 2008: Karlheinz Weinberger: Vintage Prints: Belt, Jackets, Couples and More, Anna Kustera Gallery, New York
- 2004: Lehman, Leskiw and Schedler Gallery, Toronto
- 2003: Nicole Klagsbrun Gallery, New York, USA / Marc Foxx Gallery, Los Angeles, US
- 2002: Karlheinz Weinberger, Lived life - a retrospective, Gallery Schedler, Zürich
- 2002: Karlheinz Weinberger, Photos 1954 - 1995, The Photographers' Gallery, London
- 2001: Attitude, Scalo, New York, USA
- 2000: Bully, Museum of Design, Zürich
- 1994: Tattoos by prominent Swiss tattoo artists, Egliswil
- 1993: Tattoos by prominent Swiss tattoo artists, Galerie Anita Dosch, Zürich
- 1980: The teenagers 1955 - 1960: 25 years ago when Zürich became teenagers, photo gallery Migros, Zürich

== Bibliography ==
- Patrik Schedler: Rebel, Rebel. In: McGuffin - The Life of Things, No 7 (2019) pp. 155 – 160. ISSN 2405-8203
- Patrik Schedler: Karlheinz Weinberger or the ballad by Jim - a biographical essay. Zürich: Limmat Verlag, 2018. ISBN 978-3-85791-867-4.
- Reto Caduff & Rahel Morgen (eds.): Karlheinz Weinberger: Sports, Vol.2, with an interview with Patrik Schedler. Zürich: Sturm&Drang Verlag, 2018. ISBN 978-3-906822-15-0.
- Reto Caduff & Rahel Morgen (Hrsg.): Karlheinz Weinberger: Juveniles, Vol.1. Zürich: Sturm&Drang Verlag, 2017. ISBN 978-3-906822-14-3.
- Esther Woerdehoff (ed.): Karlheinz Weinberger: Swiss Rebels. Goettingen: Steidl Verlag, 2017. ISBN 978-3-95829-380-9.
- Kunstmuseum Basel, Swiss Institute New York & Presentation House Gallery (eds.): Jeans by Karlheinz Weinberger. Toronto: Bywater Bros. Editions, Canada. ISBN 978-0-920293-85-0.
- Martynka Wawrzyniak, Patrik Schedler, Bruce Hackney (eds.): "Karlheinz Weinberger: Rebel Youth". with a foreword by John Waters and an essay by Guy Trebay. New York: Rizzoli, 2011. ISBN 978-0-8478-3612-3
- Patrik Schedler: Karlheinz Weinberger (1921-2006). In: "Acute" 1 (2007) p. 22-23. ISSN 1661-0717
- Ulrich Binder, Pietro Mattioli (ed.): Karlheinz Weinberger: Photos, 1954-1995. Zürich: Museum of Design and Andreas Züst Verlag, 2000. ISBN 3-905328-21-6
- Karl-Heinz Steinle: The Circle: Members, Artists, Authors. Berlin: Verlag rosa Winkel, 1999. (Books of the Gay Museum; 2). pp. 28–30. ISBN 3-86149-093-5
