= Piotr Zioła =

Polish rock singer

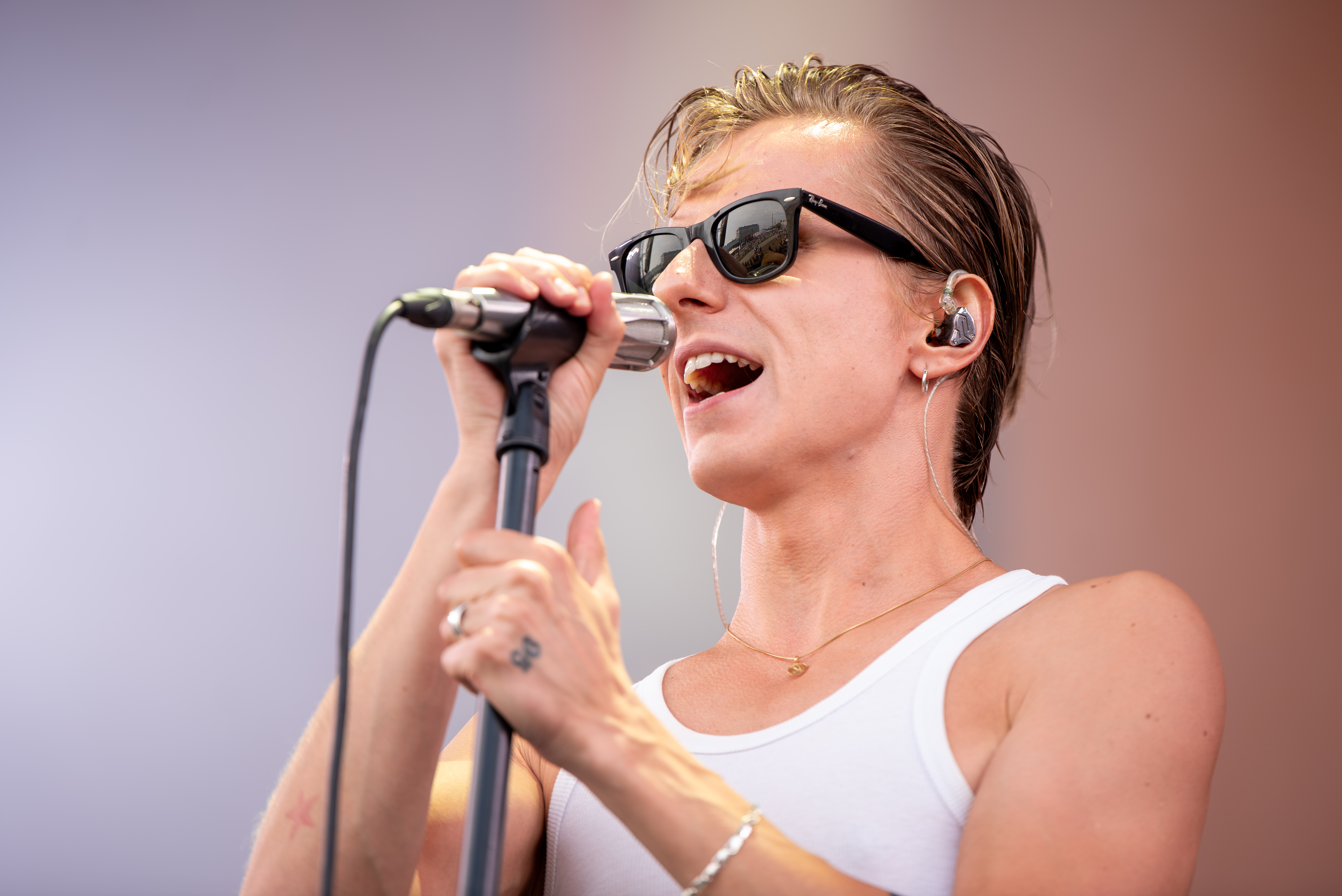
- Piotr Zioła in 2026

Background information
- Born: Piotr Karol Zioła; 24 November 1995 (age 30); Opole, Poland
- Genres: Rock
- Occupation: Singer
- Instrument: Vocals
- Years active: 2012–present
- Label: Warner Music Poland

Piotr Karol Zioła (born 24 November 1995 in Opole) is a Polish rock singer, winner of Fryderyk Award in the category of Debut of the Year (2017).

== Biography ==
He's a son of a bassist Grzegorz Zioła. He has an older sister. He started learning piano in music school at the age of six, but he stopped in 5th grade. He graduated from the High School No. 2 in Opole.

=== Career ===
In 2008 he won first prize in the Piosenkobranie competition. In 2012 he had his television debut as a 16-year-old in the Polish edition of X Factor. Although his performance of "Valerie" by Amy Winehouse was liked by the judges, he didn't make it to the next stage. After the show he met a music producer Marcin Bors and they started a collaboration.

In 2015 he appeared on the Spring Break Showcase Festival & Conference in Poznań. There, he met Justyna Święs and the band Rysy, with whom he collaborated on a track "Przyjmij brak". In the same year he performed on Open’er Festival, Warsaw Musik Week and Europejskie Targi Muzyczne "Co Jest Grane?" in Warsaw, and in August he performed with Rysy on Tauron Nowa Muzyka (with the track "Przyjmij Brak"). In October/November he published his debut single – "Podobny". 22 April 2016 was the date of the premiere of his first LP Revolving Door, with lyrics by Karolina Kozak, Gaba Kulka i Radek Łukasiewicz. In 2017 he was nominated to 2017 Fryderyki Awards in the categories of phonographic debut of the year and pop album of the year; in April he won in the first of those two categories.

=== Personal life ===
The artist came out as gay in January 2018, announcing his relationship with model Dominik Sadoch on social media.

== Discography ==
=== Studio albums ===
Title	Album details	Peak chart positions
Title	Album details	POL
Revolving Door	Released: 22 April 2016; Label: Warner Music Poland	13

=== Singles ===
Title	Year	Peak chart positions	Album
Title	Year	POL	Album
"Podobny"	2015	–	Revolving Door
"W ciemno"	2016	33	Revolving Door
"Django"	2016	–	Revolving Door
"Nie mamy skrzydeł”	2018	–	Albo inaczej 2
"–" single wasn't noted in the chart

== Awards and nominations ==
Year	Award	Category	Result	Source
2017	Fryderyk	Phonographic Debut of the Year	Won	
2017	Fryderyk	Album of the Year – Pop (Revolving Door)	Nominated	
