= List of The Fuccons episodes =

The Fuccons is a Japanese sketch comedy series produced by Yoshimasa Ishibashi centered on the family of the same name, consisting of American expatriates James and Barbara Fuccon with their son, Mikey, who are played by mannequins. The series originated as a recurring segment in Ishibashi's sketch comedy show, Vermilion Pleasure Night, under the title The Fuccon Family, which aired on TV Tokyo. The segments were followed up with The Fuccon Family Part 2 and New Fuccon Family.

A film titled The Color of Life compiling skits from Vermilion Pleasure Night was released in 2001, which also contained alternate cuts and endings to The Fuccon Family. A DVD compiling The Fuccon Family was later released on January 24, 2004.

Beginning on January 6, 2002, the series received its own late night time slot and retitled Oh! Mikey. It ran for a total of eight seasons until 2005. Afterwards, several sketches that never made it to television broadcast were released direct-to-DVD, beginning with Oh! Mikey Hard Core in 2005.

In 2004, the episodes "A Family Crisis", "The Lady Tutor", and "Mikey's Grandparents" were dubbed in English for the 54th Berlin International Film Festival, which were later released with the limited version of Oh! Mikey Hard Core. In the same year, along with Vermilion Pleasure Night, ADV Films licensed the first four seasons for North American distribution with a new English dub produced, releasing the series under the title The Fuccons. The English dub was broadcast on Anime Network, as well as a recurring segment on G4's Late Night Peepshow on G4.

ADV Films released the first 8 episodes as The Fuccons Vol. 0: Meet the Fuccons on December 20, 2005. 17 episodes were later released as The Fuccons Vol. 1: OH! Mikey on February 28, 2006. 18 episodes were released as The Fuccons Vol. 2: It's a Fuccon World! on April 25, 2006. 17 episodes were released as The Fuccons Vol. 3: Fuccon! Fuccon! Fuccon! on July 11, 2006. A compilation of vols. 1-3 were released as The Fuccons: The Whole Fuccon Show! on December 9, 2008.

== Series overview ==
Series overview
| Season | Episodes | Originally released | |
| Season | Episodes | First released | Last released |
|---|---|---|---|
| 1st | 13 | January 6, 2002 | March 31, 2002 |
| 2nd | 13 | April 2, 2002 | June 25, 2002 |
| 3rd | 13 | July 2, 2002 | September 24, 2002 |
| 4th | 13 | October 1, 2002 | December 24, 2002 |
| 5th | 13 | July 5, 2003 | September 27, 2003 |
| 6th | 13 | April 3, 2004 | June 26, 2004 |
| 7th | 13 | January 13, 2005 | April 6, 2005 |
| 8th | 12 | April 11, 2005 | July 11, 2005 |
| Hard Core | 8 | August 26, 2005 | |
| Extra | 13 | August 25, 2006 | |
| Fever | 10 | December 1, 2007 | |
| Romance | 10 | December 3, 2010 | |

== Episodes ==
=== Vermilion Pleasure Night sketches ===
The Fuccon Family (フーコン・ファミリー) is a recurring segment in the 2000 sketch comedy show Vermilion Pleasure Night. After the first part ended, it was then followed up by The Fuccon Family Part 2 (フーコン・ファミリー パート2) and New Fuccon Family (新フーコン・ファミリー). A DVD compiling The Fuccon Family was later released on January 24, 2004. In North America, the sketches were made available in English after ADV Films licensed Vermilion Pleasure Night, releasing the first volume in 2006.

==== The Fuccon Family (2000) ====
| No. overall | No. in series | Title (Note: All English episode titles were taken from Vermilion Pleasure Night's official website and ADV Films.) | Directed by | Written by | Original release date |
|---|---|---|---|---|---|
| 1 | 1 | "Just Moved In"; Transliteration: "Hikkoshite Kita" (Japanese: 引っ越して来た) | Yoshimasa Ishibashi | Sakichi Sato | July 2, 2000 |
The Fuccons move to Japan. Mikey and James talk Barbara into keeping a dog. Later, Mikey and James attempt to talk Barbara into taking Mikey to the amusement park. Barbara agrees at first, but she later confesses to James she has no plans to do so as they have sex, while Mikey is set on fire.
| 2 | 2 | "After Arriving Back From An Amusement Park (Note: "After Arriving Back From An Amusement Park", "Mikey's Confession", "Mikey's Run Away From Home", and "Mikey's Brother" were not included in the original DVD home releases of Vermilion Pleasure Night and were later released on the compilation DVD titled The Fuccon Family.)"; Transliteration: "Yūenchi ni Itta" (Japanese: 遊園地に行った) | Yoshimasa Ishibashi | Sakichi Sato | July 9, 2000 |
| 3 | 3 | "Mikey's Been Kidnapped"; Transliteration: "Maikī no Yūkai" (Japanese: マイキーの誘拐) | Yoshimasa Ishibashi | Sakichi Sato | July 16, 2000 |
James and Barbara believe Mikey has been kidnapped, but when Mikey is forced to make a phone call home, they believe he wandered off and scold him. A package containing Mikey's dismembered body is sent to their doorstep one week later, but the family treat it as Mikey learning not to stay out too late. An alternate cut of the episode released with The Color of Life shows a skit in the beginning where James convinces Mikey to hold his breath in the bathtub.
| 4 | 4 | "A Marital Dispute"; Transliteration: "Fūfu Kenka" (Japanese: 夫婦ケンカ) | Yoshimasa Ishibashi | Sakichi Sato | July 23, 2000 |
James and Barbara get into an altercation after disagreeing on whether Mikey should grow up to become a soccer player or a doctor. They deny they were fighting when Mikey approaches them, but they get into another fight over which parent he prefers.
| 5 | 5 | "Dad's Affair"; Transliteration: "Papa no Uwaki" (Japanese: パパの浮気) | Yoshimasa Ishibashi | Sakichi Sato | July 30, 2000 |
James cheats on Barbara with his Japanese secretary, but every time they attempt to break up, they both end up agreeing to continue a physical relationship. The next day, Mikey mentions that Barbara is threatening to kill him for infidelity. James talks to his secretary again, but they again agree to keep a physical relationship. Barbara appears with them, having listened to their conversation.
| 6 | 6 | "Mikey Sees All"; Transliteration: "Maikī wa Nozoku" (Japanese: マイキーは覗く) | Yoshimasa Ishibashi | Sakichi Sato | August 6, 2000 |
Mikey spies on Barbara having sex with the delivery man, taking a shower, and having sex with James. He then peeks into the package that James ordered.
| 7 | 7 | "Mikey's Illness"; Transliteration: "Byōki no Maikī" (Japanese: 病気のマイキー) | Yoshimasa Ishibashi | Sakichi Sato | August 13, 2000 |
Mikey is forced to eat breakfast and attend school despite being ill because neither James nor Barbara believe him. James and Barbara later decide to skip work by pretending they are sick while Mikey collapses on the front steps.
| 8 | 8 | "Moving Away"; Transliteration: "Hikkoshite Itta" (Japanese: 引っ越して行った) | Yoshimasa Ishibashi | Sakichi Sato | August 20, 2000 |
The Fuccons move out, but James and Barbara later realize that they did not tell Mikey and have accidentally left him behind. When they return, they find Mikey grown up and married with a child to a woman named Jennifer. An alternate cut released with The Color of Life combines the episode with the ending of "Goodbye, Fuccon Family."

==== The Fuccon Family Part 2 (2000) ====
| No. overall | No. in series | Title | Directed by | Written by | Original release date |
|---|---|---|---|---|---|
| 9 | 1 | "Mikey's Confession"; Transliteration: "Kokuhaku" (Japanese: 告白) | Yoshimasa Ishibashi | Sakichi Sato | October 15, 2000 |
| 10 | 2 | "Mikey's Run Away From Home"; Transliteration: "Iede" (Japanese: 家出) | Yoshimasa Ishibashi | Sakichi Sato | October 22, 2000 |
| 11 | 3 | "Mikey's Exorcism"; Transliteration: "Tsukurareta Maikī" (Japanese: 憑かれたマイキー) | Yoshimasa Ishibashi | Sakichi Sato | October 27, 2000 |
Mikey is forced to eat breakfast and attend school despite being possessed by a demon because neither James nor Barbara believe him. James and Barbara eventually realize this, but they do not believe Mikey when he says he was pretending. Mikey later wakes up, revealing it all to be a dream, and he discovers both James and Barbara are possessed by demons when he arrives for breakfast.
| 12 | 4 | "Mikey's Brother"; Transliteration: "Kyōdai" (Japanese: 兄弟) | Yoshimasa Ishibashi | Sakichi Sato | November 3, 2000 |
Mikey wants a brother, but James and Barbara repeatedly refuse to have another child. Eventually, they tell him to find his own brother. By the time Mikey returns from his search, he has grown older and has a child with a woman named Nancy. The three move in to live with James and Barbara, with Barbara grudgingly acknowledging she and Nancy will get into conflicts in the future.

==== New Fuccon Family (2000) ====
| No. overall | No. in series | Title | Directed by | Written by | Original release date |
|---|---|---|---|---|---|
| 13 | 1 | "The Return"; Transliteration: "Kaette Kita Fūkon Famirī" (Japanese: 帰って来たフーコン・ファミリー) | Yoshimasa Ishibashi | Sakichi Sato | November 10, 2000 |
The Fuccons move to a new house, but their Japanese neighbor comes over to yell at them every time they laugh. One day, the neighbor walks in on Barbara undressing, and James attacks him with a baseball bat. Mikey is convinced that he is arrested, but it is revealed that James killed and buried him in their backyard.
| 14 | 2 | "Let's Go For a Drive"; Transliteration: "Doraibu e Ikō" (Japanese: ドライブへ行こう) | Yoshimasa Ishibashi | Sakichi Sato | November 17, 2000 |
The Fuccons go for a drive, and Barbara keeps warning James to be careful. James gets beheaded when he sticks his head outside of the window. Mikey sticks his head outside of the window to call of help, but he gets beheaded as well.
| 15 | 3 | "Growing Mikey"; Transliteration: "Gurōingu Appu Maikī" (Japanese: グローイングアップ・マイキ－) | Yoshimasa Ishibashi | Sakichi Sato | November 24, 2000 |
Mikey has become rebellious and refuses to take baths with his parents, leading them to think that he is going through puberty. When James educates him about this, Mikey reveals that he is growing a sunflower on his groin, and the parents confirm that he is physically ill.
| 16 | 4 | "New Dad"; Transliteration: "Atarashii Papa" (Japanese: 新しいパパ) | Yoshimasa Ishibashi | Sakichi Sato | December 1, 2000 |
Barbara brings in a man named Sugiura and insists Mikey refer to him as his father. Mikey is reluctant at first but eventually gives in. However, Barbara reveals that she brought Sugiura into the family as a temporary father until James returns from his business trip.
| 17 | 5 | "Mikey's Birthday"; Transliteration: "Maikī no Tanjōbi" (Japanese: マイキーの誕生日) | Yoshimasa Ishibashi | Sakichi Sato | December 8, 2000 |
On his birthday, Mikey wakes up early and cleans his room, but James and Barbara find his behavior suspicious and confront him about it. After Mikey confesses, James and Barbara try to cover the fact they forgot about his birthday by blaming him for keeping secrets.
| 18 | 6 | "Goodbye, Fuccon Family"; Transliteration: "Sayōnara Maikī, Konnichiwa Maikī" (Japanese: さようならマイキー、こんにちはマイキー) | Yoshimasa Ishibashi | Sakichi Sato | December 15, 2000 |
James and Barbara divorce, but neither will take custody of Mikey and order him to live alone in their old house. Years later, they find Mikey grown up and married with a child to a woman named Jennifer. Mikey has become wealthy and does not recognize his parents, ordering a yakuza henchmen to shoot them dead. A pregnant Barbara wakes up from her dream and makes James promise to be more affectionate to their child, opting to name him "Mikey."

=== Season 1 (2002) ===
The first season, titled Oh! Mikey 1st in Japan, was broadcast from January 6, 2002, to March 31, 2002, on TV Tokyo for 13 episodes. It was later released on DVD on December 11, 2002, by Avex Trax. In North America, a Region 1 DVD with seasons 1 and 2 was released on February 28, 2006, under the title The Fuccons Vol. 1: Oh! Mikey.

| No. | Title | Directed by | Written by | Original release date |
|---|---|---|---|---|
| 1 | "The Start of Our Life in Japan"; Transliteration: "Nihon de no Seikatsu ga Hajimaru" (Japanese: 日本での生活が始まる) | Yoshimasa Ishibashi | Yoshimasa Ishibashi | January 6, 2002 |
The Fuccons move to Japan. Mikey asks his parents to take him to the amusement park, but they make excuses why they can't to avoid having to do so.
| 2 | "The Teacher's Visit"; Transliteration: "Katei Hōmon" (Japanese: 家庭訪問) | Yoshimasa Ishibashi | Sakichi Sato | January 13, 2002 |
Mikey tells his parents that his teacher will be visiting their house. Unprepared, James and Barbara panic until Mikey tells them he will be coming next week.
| 3 | "The Teacher's Visit Continued"; Transliteration: "Tsuzuki Katei Hōmon" (Japanese: 続・家庭訪問) | Yoshimasa Ishibashi | Sakichi Sato | January 20, 2002 |
Teacher Bob visits the Fuccons, with his mother, Bob-Mama, accompanying him as his interpreter, because he is too shy to speak out loud.
| 4 | "Mikey's Cousin"; Transliteration: "Maikī no Itoko" (Japanese: マイキーのいとこ) | Yoshimasa Ishibashi | Yoshimasa Ishibashi | January 27, 2002 |
Mikey's cousin from America, Laura, comes to visit, but she is so rude that James and Barbara convince him to keep her company in order to get her to leave. Mikey finally befriends Laura, but, in the end, she says that she will leave Japan only if she is bored.
| 5 | "Mikey Goes Shopping"; Transliteration: "Maikī no Okaimono" (Japanese: マイキーのお買い物) | Yoshimasa Ishibashi | Yoshimasa Ishibashi | February 3, 2002 |
Barbara sends Mikey on a shopping errand but her shopping list is too difficult for him to memorize. With his father secretly following him to ensure he is successful, Mikey gets lost and eventually ends up in Kyoto.
| 6 | "Mikey and the Twins"; Transliteration: "Sōji to Maikī" (Japanese: 双児とマイキー) | Yoshimasa Ishibashi | Yoshimasa Ishibashi | February 10, 2002 |
Mikey meets Tony and Charles, twin brothers from England. Mikey offers to play with them, but their contradictions confuse and annoy him. Despite saying otherwise, they return to the park on the next day, apologizing and becoming Mikey's friends.
| 7 | "The Twins Visit"; Transliteration: "Sōji no Hōmon" (Japanese: 双児の訪問) | Yoshimasa Ishibashi | Yoshimasa Ishibashi | February 17, 2002 |
Tony and Charles visit Mikey's house uninvited, and their contradictions confuse and annoy Barbara and James.
| 8 | "Mikey's Date"; Transliteration: "Maikī no Dēto" (Japanese: マイキーのデート) | Yoshimasa Ishibashi | Sakichi Sato | February 24, 2002 |
Upset that Mikey wants to spend time with Emily instead, Laura accuses Mikey of stealing money from her in front of Emily, causing her to leave him disgust and hang out with Laura.
| 9 | "A Heated Exchange"; Transliteration: "Bobu-sensei to Bobu-mama no Ōgenka" (Japanese: ボブ先生とボブママの大ゲンカ) | Yoshimasa Ishibashi | Sakichi Sato | March 3, 2002 |
While out for lunch, the Fuccons find Teacher Bob and Bob-Mama arguing whether to eat Japanese noodles, with Bob-Mama relaying each exchange. The two quickly compromise on Chinese noodles.
| 10 | "Mikey and Milk"; Transliteration: "Maikī to Gyūnyū" (Japanese: マイキーと牛乳) | Yoshimasa Ishibashi | Sakichi Sato | March 10, 2002 |
Mikey refuses to drink milk, so James and Barbara pretend they are held hostage with the help of Teacher Bob and Bob-Mama to convince him.
| 11 | "Mikey Gets Dumped"; Transliteration: "Furareta Maikī" (Japanese: ふられたマイキー) | Yoshimasa Ishibashi | Sakichi Sato | March 17, 2002 |
Mikey sees Emily hanging out with a boy and he believes she has dumped him. His parents convince her to win her back by taking on a new identity, a girl named Mayumi. Mikey approaches Emily and the boy as Mayumi, only to learn that the boy is Emily's older brother, Brown, and that he has developed feelings for his Mayumi identity.
| 12 | "A Peep Hole"; Transliteration: "Aho ga Miru Buta no Ketsu" (Japanese: アホがみるブタのケツ) | Yoshimasa Ishibashi | Sakichi Sato | March 24, 2002 |
While waiting for Emily, Mikey sees a peep hole with a sign telling others not to look. He looks through only to find a picture of a pig's butt, but receives a black ring around his eye as a result. Emily is disgusted with him despite looking through the hole herself and cancels their date. Mikey returns home to see that both his parents have also looked through the hole.
| 13 | "Laura's Love"; Transliteration: "Rōra no Koi" (Japanese: ローラの恋) | Yoshimasa Ishibashi | Yoshimasa Ishibashi, Sakichi Sato | March 31, 2002 |
Laura gets upset with Mikey, and the twins tell her it's because she's in love with him. Laura runs off, and when Mikey follows her, she tells him she will return to America. Mikey gladly encourages her to do so.

=== Season 2 (2002) ===
The second season, titled Oh! Mikey 2nd in Japan, was broadcast from April 2, 2002, to June 25, 2002, on TV Tokyo for 13 episodes. In North America, a Region 1 DVD with seasons 1 and 2 was released on February 28, 2006, under the title The Fuccons Vol. 1: Oh! Mikey.

| No. | Title | Directed by | Written by | Original release date |
|---|---|---|---|---|
| 14 | "Let's Go on A Picnic"; Transliteration: "Pikunikku e Ikou" (Japanese: ピクニックへ行こう) | Yoshimasa Ishibashi | Yoshimasa Ishibashi | April 2, 2002 |
The Fuccons go on a picnic but discover they do not enjoy picnic-related activities, such as playing badminton. James and Mikey also criticize Barbara for putting leek in their sandwiches and omusubi. They later conclude picnics make them fight all the time, just as they do at home.
| 15 | "Mikey and The Ghost"; Transliteration: "Maikī to Obake" (Japanese: マイキーとおばけ) | Yoshimasa Ishibashi | Sakichi Sato | April 9, 2002 |
Lilly, a ghost resembling Laura, invites Mikey to the night life every night. When James and Barbara discover this, they warn Mikey that Lilly is dragging him to the spirit world and give him a talisman. At night, Mikey learns that Lilly is Laura. The next morning, Mikey wakes up bald, while Laura has his hair. James and Barbara believe that the talisman protected Mikey, but not his hair.
| 16 | "Christina My Love"; Transliteration: "Itoshi no Kurisutīna" (Japanese: 愛しのクリスティーナ) | Yoshimasa Ishibashi | Sakichi Sato | April 16, 2002 |
Mikey invites Emily to his house, but James becomes infatuated with her because she resembles his first love, Christina, who happens to be her mother. When Mikey meets Christina, she becomes infatuated with him because he resembles James. James and Christina do not recognize each other but continue to call out to Mikey and Emily as each other.
| 17 | "The Twins and an Alien"; Transliteration: "Sōji to Uchū-jin" (Japanese: 双児と宇宙人) | Yoshimasa Ishibashi | Yoshimasa Ishibashi | April 23, 2002 |
Mikey plays with Tony and Charles in the park, but he gets annoyed with them when the twins do not hide properly during hide-and-seek and argue with each other instead of playing tag. The twins claim they can summon an alien, Mikey remains unimpressed, as the alien turns out to be Teacher Bob.
| 18 | "Here Comes 'Time Boy'"; Transliteration: "Taimu-kun Tōjō" (Japanese: タイム君登場) | Yoshimasa Ishibashi | Sakichi Sato | April 30, 2002 |
Mikey spends the day with Time Boy, but Time Boy insists on following a schedule, causing Mikey to lose his house key while trying to keep up. Time Boy panics when Mikey refuses to knock down the front door, and because they did not follow the schedule, they must start over. Meanwhile, James and Barbara arrive home, and they decide to knock down the front door after Barbara realizes she lost her house key.
| 19 | "Emily's Blues"; Transliteration: "Hashi no Ue no Emirī-chan" (Japanese: 橋の上のエミリーちゃん) | Yoshimasa Ishibashi | Sakichi Sato | May 7, 2002 |
Emily gets to a fight with Brown and looks for Mikey to have him comfort her. Mikey finds her and reveals that he left to pick flowers for her. The two confess their love, but a caterpillar from the flowers crawls onto Emily's hand, frightening them both. Brown removes the caterpillar as an apology to Emily and it falls on Mikey's face. Everyone makes fun of Mikey for failing to impress Emily, while Emily realizes Brown is the only person she can depend on.
| 20 | "The Wrong Number"; Transliteration: "Machigai Denwa" (Japanese: 間違い電話) | Yoshimasa Ishibashi | Sakichi Sato | May 14, 2002 |
Mikey answers the phone for Barbara. Each time he does, he receives a call from Mirai from Main Street and he forgets to ask for caller details when reporting to Barbara. After getting all the details, Barbara tells him that the caller had the wrong number but suggests he ask for a phone number next time to make prank calls.
| 21 | "Mikey in the Mirror"; Transliteration: "Kagami no Naka no Maikī" (Japanese: 鏡の中のマイキー) | Yoshimasa Ishibashi | Yoshimasa Ishibashi, Sakichi Sato | May 21, 2002 |
Mikey gets into a fight with Emily and consults his own mirror reflection for advice. Mirror Mikey gives him advice that makes Emily hate him even more. He later insists that he is the real Mikey, and the world that Mikey in is fake. Mikey stops asking him for advice, while Mirror Mikey reveals that he lives in a world where no one loves him.
| 22 | "The Invitation"; Transliteration: "Maikī e no Shōtaijō" (Japanese: マイキーへの招待状) | Yoshimasa Ishibashi | Sakichi Sato | May 28, 2002 |
Mikey receives an invitation from Laura and Emily, who scam him into becoming a customer of their hostess club. The girls and Brown demand Mikey to pay ¥100,000 for their time and drinks. Like Time Boy and the twins from earlier, Mikey is sent home in tears. On his way back, he runs into James, who becomes Laura and Emily's next victim.
| 23 | "The Chill Wind of Structural Reform"; Transliteration: "Risutora Keikaku" (Japanese: リストラ計画) | Yoshimasa Ishibashi | Sakichi Sato | June 4, 2002 |
After discussing company restructuring, the Fuccons decide to restructure their own family by forcing one of them to leave. Through a poll, James counts all votes as a tie, so all of them get to stay. However, he reveals he had lied about the results, and that he was the family member voted out.
| 24 | "The Lady Tutor"; Transliteration: "Katei Kyōshi no Onēsan" (Japanese: 家庭教師のお姉さん) | Yoshimasa Ishibashi | Yoshimasa Ishibashi | June 11, 2002 |
Mikey gets a tutor to help him with his falling grades, who turns out to be a sexually attractive woman named Tracy. James and Barbara suspect that Tracy is making sexual advances on Mikey and intervene, only to realize Tracy was teaching him origami.
| 25 | "Rags to Riches"; Transliteration: "Warashibe Chōja" (Japanese: わらしべ長者) | Yoshimasa Ishibashi | Yoshimasa Ishibashi, Sakichi Sato | June 18, 2002 |
Mikey is kicked out of the house for overspending on comics and video games. Through a series of trades, he helps out a man who reveals himself as the king of the Blueberry Kingdom. The king wants to adopt Mikey, but James and Barbara both refuse until they are offered 1 million yen.
| 26 | "Super Princess Isabella"; Transliteration: "Chō O-hime-sama Izabera" (Japanese: 超お姫様イザベラ) | Yoshimasa Ishibashi | Sakichi Sato | June 25, 2002 |
Isabella, the princess of the Blueberry Kingdom, visits the Fuccons to announce her marriage to Mikey. James and Barbara oppose until Isabella offers to hire them as Mikey's servants with a salary of ¥1 million.

=== Season 3 (2002) ===
The third season, titled Oh! Mikey 3rd in Japan, was broadcast from July 2, 2002, to September 24, 2002, on TV Tokyo for 13 episodes.

| No. | Title | Directed by | Written by | Original release date |
|---|---|---|---|---|
| 27 | "The Twins and the Princess"; Transliteration: "Sōji to O-hime-sama" (Japanese: 双児とお姫様) | Yoshimasa Ishibashi | Yoshimasa Ishibashi | July 2, 2002 |
Isabella comes to pick up Mikey from school and meets Tony and Charles. The twins argue over her wealth, and she threatens to call the police when they follow her. This draws the attention of Teacher Bob, who, through Bob-Mama, asks that she pay him to have him leave her alone. Isabella leaves the four, while Teacher Bob shares wisdom about wealth to the twins.
| 28 | "Mikey the Ladies Man"; Transliteration: "Motemote Maikī" (Japanese: もてもてマイキー) | Yoshimasa Ishibashi | Yoshimasa Ishibashi | July 9, 2002 |
Emily and Laura confront Mikey over his engagement to Isabella, and Mikey chooses Isabella out of the three girls for her wealth. When Tracy appears in the middle of the argument, all three girls decide that Mikey is a womanizer and leave, with Isabella breaking their engagement.
| 29 | "Laura the Fortune Teller"; Transliteration: "Uranaishi Rōra" (Japanese: 占い師ローラ) | Yoshimasa Ishibashi | Sakichi Sato | July 16, 2002 |
With the help of Brown, Laura manipulates Mikey into believing her fortunes will come true to force him to fall in love with her. This makes him paranoid, but he later decides to confront his fears by making all of his misfortune come true.
| 30 | "The Twins' Mother"; Transliteration: "Sōji no Haha" (Japanese: 双児の母) | Yoshimasa Ishibashi | Yoshimasa Ishibashi | July 23, 2002 |
Tony and Charles visit the Fuccons uninvited again, this time with their mother Elena and her twin sister Helena. All four twins talk condescendingly to Barbara while arguing with each other through contradictions. In the middle of the argument, James and Barbara secretly escape.
| 31 | "The Message Game"; Transliteration: "Dengon Gēmu" (Japanese: 伝言ゲーム) | Yoshimasa Ishibashi | Sakichi Sato | July 30, 2002 |
The class decides to play a message game. They deduce that Teacher Bob is the person who muddled the message, and he yells at them, revealing his true voice.
| 32 | "Brown's Forbidden Love"; Transliteration: "Buraun Kindan no Koi" (Japanese: ブラウン禁断の恋) | Yoshimasa Ishibashi | Sakichi Sato | August 6, 2002 |
Brown has fallen in love with Barbara and asks Mikey to help him woo her in exchange for putting in a good word with Emily. Mikey agrees and leads Barbara to Brown's booth. Barbara gets intimate with Brown, but Brown tells Mikey's favor will have no impact with Mikey and Emily's relationship.
| 33 | "A Family Crisis"; Transliteration: "Papa to Mama no Iiwake" (Japanese: パパとママの言い訳) | Yoshimasa Ishibashi | Sakichi Sato | August 13, 2002 |
Mikey decides to ask for his parents' help on a crossword puzzle but accidentally walks in on them having sex. James and Barbara panic and convince him that they were sumo wrestling when he tries to speak up the next morning. Mikey believes them and asks a question about his puzzle where the answer is "sex". Unable to answer, James and Barbara drive away from the house.
| 34 | "The Twins' Birthday"; Transliteration: "Sōji no Tanjōbi" (Japanese: 双児の誕生日) | Yoshimasa Ishibashi | Yoshimasa Ishibashi | August 20, 2002 |
Tony and Charles invite Mikey and Emily to their house for a birthday party, which Elena and Helena are also attending. All four twins argue in contradictions over not preparing cake and gifts, until Tony and Charles reveal that their birthday was six months ago and intentionally did not state that the party was for their birthday.
| 35 | "A Courageous Stance"; Transliteration: "Papa no Yūki" (Japanese: パパの勇気) | Yoshimasa Ishibashi | Yoshimasa Ishibashi, Sakichi Sato | August 27, 2002 |
James attempts to impress Mikey with his masculinity and scolds him for not disposing his gum properly. Mikey points out a punk is doing the same and urges James to confront him. James is too scared to do so, even when Mikey threatens to tell Barbara about his infidelity, but he pretends he forced the punk to clean up after himself despite hiding his gum under his shoe.
| 36 | "The Kawakita Family"; Transliteration: "Kawakita Famirī" (Japanese: 川北ファミリー) | Yoshimasa Ishibashi | Yoshimasa Ishibashi, Sakichi Sato | September 3, 2002 |
In a parody of the episode "Just Moved In", the Kawakita Family moves from Kyoto. Satoru attempts to talk Mamoru and Nobuyo into keeping a turtle, but they refuse. He later tries talking them into taking him to an amusement park, but they take him to a playground instead.
| 37 | "The Twins' Treasure Hunt"; Transliteration: "Sōji no Takara Sagashi" (Japanese: 双児の宝探し) | Yoshimasa Ishibashi | Yoshimasa Ishibashi | September 10, 2002 |
Tony and Charles ask Mikey to join them in a treasure hunt, but they manipulate him into doing the digging under the promise they split the treasure. Mikey ends up finding both Tony and Charles' missing shoes.
| 38 | "Fly Mikey!"; Transliteration: "Tobe! Maikī" (Japanese: 飛べ！マイキー) | Yoshimasa Ishibashi | Yoshimasa Ishibashi, Sakichi Sato | September 17, 2002 |
Emily is unamused at Mikey's fear of fish when they go fishing and believes he is not brave enough for their companionship. Mikey later finds her drowning, but because he cannot swim, Laura decides to jump in and save her, but she ends up drowning, too. Mikey dives and saves the both of them. Emily reputes Laura is more important to Mikey and allows him to be with Laura, but Mikey returns to her anyway, ignoring the latter.
| 39 | "A Wedding Anniversary"; Transliteration: "Kekkon Kinenbi" (Japanese: 結婚記念日) | Yoshimasa Ishibashi | Yoshimasa Ishibashi | September 24, 2002 |
James and Barbara's wedding anniversary is today, and they tell Mikey about how they met, with images about the true nature of their relationship juxtaposed over a false narrative. When James admits to Barbara that he did not take the day off to spend time with her, they get into an altercation, with Mikey cheering them on.

=== Season 4 (2002) ===
The fourth season, titled Oh! Mikey 4th in Japan, was broadcast from October 1, 2002, to December 24, 2002, on TV Tokyo for 13 episodes. It was later released on DVD on July 19, 2003.

| No. | Title | Directed by | Written by | Original release date |
|---|---|---|---|---|
| 40 | "Mikey's Grandparents"; Transliteration: "Maikī no Ojīsan" (Japanese: マイキーのおじいさん) | Yoshimasa Ishibashi | Yoshimasa Ishibashi | October 1, 2002 |
The Fuccons visit James' parents, but both of them keep forgetting them until they recognize their laughter.
| 41 | "Traffic Light"; Transliteration: "Maikī to Shingō" (Japanese: マイキーと信号) | Yoshimasa Ishibashi | Sakichi Sato | October 8, 2002 |
Mikey is late for his date with Emily, and Barbara warns him to be careful of traffic. On his way, Mikey encounters Tony and Charles, who make contradictions stating that waiting for traffic lights to change is unnecessary if there is no traffic, and they run a red light crossing the street. Mikey does the same, but he is run over by his parents' car.
| 42 | "Grandma Comes to Japan"; Transliteration: "Obāsan no Rainichi" (Japanese: おばあさんの来日) | Yoshimasa Ishibashi | Yoshimasa Ishibashi | October 15, 2002 |
Mikey and Laura find Mikey's grandmother, who has come to visit in Japan. Grandma speaks in contradictions due to impaired memory about being separated from Grandpa, who she had a fight with on the way. As Grandpa catches up with them, they confuse Mikey for Laura. Mikey gives up on talking to them and follows Laura away.
| 43 | "That Sinking Feeling"; Transliteration: "Maikī Chinbotsu" (Japanese: マイキー沈没) | Yoshimasa Ishibashi | Sakichi Sato | October 22, 2002 |
Mikey waits for Emily at a park, but he begins to sink into the sand. Despite attempts from Emily, the twins, Teacher Bob, and Bob-Mama, he continues to sink until he is pulled out from another side of town by James, who had found him with his head stuck in the sand.
| 44 | "Mikey the Criminal"; Transliteration: "Hanzaisha Maikī" (Japanese: 犯罪者マイキ－) | Yoshimasa Ishibashi | Sakichi Sato | October 29, 2002 |
Mikey wants to buy a new pair of shoes to impress Emily, but he has no money. He finds a missing wallet and decides to use the money instead of giving the wallet to the police station. Laura witnesses him and calls him a criminal, reducing him to tears. It is then revealed that this a film produced by Brown, and he encourages Laura to insult Mikey to make him cry convincingly.
| 45 | "Arranging a Marriage For Teacher Bob"; Transliteration: "Bobu-sensei no Omiai" (Japanese: ボブ先生のお見合い) | Yoshimasa Ishibashi | Yoshimasa Ishibashi | November 5, 2002 |
Teacher Bob has an omiai with Sachie, and their mothers give them time alone to get acquainted with each other. Teacher Bob rejects the marriage offer because Sachie does not like Chinese noodles.
| 46 | "Broken Promises"; Transliteration: "Maikī no Yakusoku" (Japanese: マイキーの約束) | Yoshimasa Ishibashi | Sakichi Sato | November 12, 2002 |
James and Barbara forget their promise to take Mikey to an amusement park and are unable to spend time with him due to having other plans. Mikey finds Mikako, a woman who has been waiting for her boyfriend Sakurada for three years and one week. Touched by her dedication, Mikey confesses his love to her until Sakurada suddenly returns. Mikako immediately forgets Mikey and leaves with Sakurada, causing Mikey to return to his parents in tears.
| 47 | "A Blast From the Past"; Transliteration: "Papa no Dokyūsei" (Japanese: パパの同級生) | Yoshimasa Ishibashi | Sakichi Sato | November 19, 2002 |
While fishing, the Fuccons meet Raymond, a man in a fundoshi who claims to have been in the fundoshi club with James when they were in college. Mikey and Barbara are disgusted by him and are relieved when James claims no knowledge of the incident. However, James joins Raymond in a fundoshi, causing Barbara to consider divorcing him.
| 48 | "A Celebration in the Kawakita House"; Transliteration: "Kawakita-ke no Tanjōbi" (Japanese: 川北家の誕生日) | Yoshimasa Ishibashi | Yoshimasa Ishibashi | November 26, 2002 |
Mamoru decides to make dinner for Satoru's birthday, which causes him and Nobuyo to recall their first meeting with each other. After getting drunk and reminiscing their past, they forget to prepare Satoru's birthday meal and decide to forego it altogether.
| 49 | "Mikey, the Imposter"; Transliteration: "Nise Maikī" (Japanese: にせマイキー) | Yoshimasa Ishibashi | Yoshimasa Ishibashi | December 3, 2002 |
Laura, the twins, and Emily blame Mikey for stealing from them. Mikey and James suspect that there is someone impersonating him, and they find the imposter with Emily. However, neither Mikeys are able to prove which one of them is the imposter, causing Emily and James to lose interest and leave.
| 50 | "A Curious Acquaintance"; Transliteration: "Nande-kun no Nande" (Japanese: ナンデ君のナンデ) | Yoshimasa Ishibashi | Sakichi Sato | December 10, 2002 |
While practicing for a soccer match, Mikey meets a boy nicknamed Why, who keeps asking, "Why?" to any situation. Mikey gets frustrated with his questions and ask James and Barbara to help, but his questions cause them to fight. After James and Barbara settle their argument with laughter, they reveal to Why that they have no reason to laugh and invite him to join, causing him to continuously ask why.
| 51 | "Let's Go to the Beach"; Transliteration: "Bīchi e Ikou" (Japanese: ビーチへ行こう) | Yoshimasa Ishibashi | Yoshimasa Ishibashi | December 17, 2002 |
The Fuccons go to the beach, where they meet Laura, the twins, and Emily. Laura tells Mikey that she will be returning to America soon, but she is unconvinced at his concern towards her. The twins console Laura, and Laura encourages Mikey to pursue Emily. After Laura disappears, the boys express relief that she will no longer bother them until Laura reappears, stating that she will never leave Japan.
| 52 | "Mikey Turns the Other Cheek"; Transliteration: "Tenshi no Maikī" (Japanese: 天使のマイキー) | Yoshimasa Ishibashi | Sakichi Sato | December 24, 2002 |
Emily becomes concerned that Mikey may be hiding a part of him from her because he never gets upset at anything she does. Laura convinces her to make Mikey angry on purpose by yelling and pushing at him. Emily becomes convinced that Mikey is an angel after he still fails to get upset with her until Laura helps her understand that Mikey is too stupid to get angry at anything.

=== Season 5 (2003) ===
The fifth season, titled Oh! Mikey 5th in Japan, was broadcast beginning July 5, 2003 to September 27, 2003, on TV Tokyo for 13 episodes. It was later released on DVD on July 7, 2004.

| No. | Title (Note: All English episode titles were taken from English subtitles from the Japanese DVD home releases.) | Directed by | Written by | Original release date |
|---|---|---|---|---|
| 53 | "Manners Are Important"; Transliteration: "Manā ga Daiji" (Japanese: マナーが大事) | Yoshimasa Ishibashi | Yoshimasa Ishibashi, Sakichi Sato | July 5, 2003 |
At a restaurant, James and Barbara encourage Mikey to imitate proper table manners from the other customers. He imitates Mamoru and Satoru's rude behavior, to James and Barbara's displeasure. However, the inattentive waitress angers James and Barbara, and they threaten to get her fired, while Mamoru teaches Satoru not to behave like them.
| 54 | "A Real Alien Invasion"; Transliteration: "Honmono no Uchū-jin no Raishū" (Japanese: 本物の宇宙人の来襲) | Yoshimasa Ishibashi | Sakichi Sato | July 12, 2003 |
While playing with Emily, Mikey flies off a swing and finds a squid in a fountain, who insists that he is an alien. Mikey refuses to believe him, and after an argument, he turns him into a dish and eats him. Emily later finds Mikey on the ground, having hit his head after flying off the swing, though the alien appears behind her.
| 55 | "A Wife's Suspicion"; Transliteration: "Mama no Uwaki Chōsa" (Japanese: ママの浮気調査) | Yoshimasa Ishibashi | Sakichi Sato | July 19, 2003 |
Barbara suspects James is cheating on her and secretly follows him throughout the day, with Mikey tagging along. They end up in an apartment building, where they learn that James secretly likes to crossdress with Teacher Bob. James and Barbara make up.
| 56 | "A Suspicious Husband"; Transliteration: "Papa no Uwaki Chōsa" (Japanese: パパの浮気調査) | Yoshimasa Ishibashi | Yoshimasa Ishibashi | July 26, 2003 |
James suspects Barbara is cheating on him and secretly follows her throughout the day, with Mikey tagging along. They end up in an apartment building, where they learn that Barbara was searching for Mikey, who she had fought with earlier. With two Mikeys present, neither of them are able to prove which Mikey is the imposter, leading James and Barbara to believe the other is an imposter as well. They get into an altercation while both Mikeys cheer them on.
| 57 | "A Younger Boy"; Transliteration: "Toshishita no Otokonoko" (Japanese: 年下の男の子) | Shinsuke Tachikawa | Sakichi Sato | August 2, 2003 |
Mikey meets Emily's younger brother, Romeo, who is rude towards women while being smitten with men. Mikey becomes uncomfortable with his advances and runs home. While Barbara confronts him, James' arrival causes Romeo to shift his affections to him instead.
| 58 | "Lucky Mikey"; Transliteration: "Kōun na Maikī" (Japanese: 幸運なマイキー) | Shinsuke Tachikawa | Midori Sugioka | August 9, 2003 |
The Fuccons are each one of 5 billion people to be given a lucky bell that will cause good luck. After finding all the items he's wanted, Mikey finds Laura and Emily digging for a hot spring. Both girls berate him for coasting on his good luck and accuse the Fuccons of stealing the items they found. The Fuccons help the girls dig, but they are unsuccessful and decide to go on a hot springs trip to clean themselves up. It is then revealed the entire situation was a ruse by Laura and Emily to get the Fuccons to take them to the hot springs.
| 59 | "Flowers of Sin"; Transliteration: "Mi kara Deta Hana" (Japanese: 身から出た花) | Shinsuke Tachikawa | Toshiaki Negi | August 16, 2003 |
James accuses Mikey of breaking a vase, and when Mikey denies it, the next day, a flower grows on his head. James becomes angry that Mikey lied to him, and Mikey promises to be honest from now on. Mikey and Emily confess unsavory but truthful thoughts they've had about each other, while James and Barbara reaffirm their love for each other as bouquets of flowers grows on both of their heads.
| 60 | "Fashionable Mikey"; Transliteration: "Oshare na Maikī" (Japanese: オシャレなマイキー) | Shinsuke Tachikawa | Yoshimasa Ishibashi, Toshiaki Negi | August 23, 2003 |
As Mikey's hair is getting too long, James gives him a terrible haircut. Barbara suggests Mikey go see a hairdresser. Mikey becomes suspicious of the hairdresser, who gives him an afro perm without permission. While the Fuccons disapprove, birds flock to Mikey's hair, and they decide that the hairstyle will make Mikey popular.
| 61 | "Mikey the Vampire"; Transliteration: "Maikī no Banpaia" (Japanese: マイキーのバンパイア) | Shinsuke Tachikawa | Sakichi Sato | August 30, 2003 |
Mikey finds that all of his friends and family have turned into vampires. He tries to escape, but he is bitten and turns into one as well. However, he realizes that he doesn't mind being a vampire, as he hates being left out of the group.
| 62 | "Mikey the Amnesiac"; Transliteration: "Maikī no Kioku Sōshitsu" (Japanese: マイキーの記憶喪失) | Shinsuke Tachikawa | Sakichi Sato | September 6, 2003 |
After Mikey forgets he was supposed to spend time with Laura, Laura kicks a soccer ball into his head, knocking him out and giving him amnesia. Fearing that she will be blamed, Laura kicks a soccer ball into Tony and Charles and lies that the three gave each other amnesia. Barbara reverses the changes by kicking another soccer ball to Mikey's head. Mikey receives his memories back, but his body moves backwards.
| 63 | "Laura's Mom"; Transliteration: "Rōra no Haha" (Japanese: ローラの母) | Shinsuke Tachikawa | Yoshimasa Ishibashi | September 13, 2003 |
Laura's mother, Mary, visits the Fuccons, demanding that Laura returns with her to America, but Laura refuses. James and Barbara try to calm them down until they realize Mary will stay at their house until Laura leaves with her, after which they urge her to do so.
| 64 | "Laura on the Docks"; Transliteration: "Hatoba no Rōra" (Japanese: 波止場のローラ) | Shinsuke Tachikawa | Yoshimasa Ishibashi | September 20, 2003 |
James and Barbara urge Mikey to convince Laura to leave Japan. Mikey finds her on the docks, but she refuses to believe he cares for her and jumps into the ocean. Tracy rescues her, and Mary allows Laura to stay in Japan after realizing she loves her friends in Japan. However, Laura decides she will be leaving, which causes Mikey to cry.
| 65 | "Mikey Watches the House"; Transliteration: "Maikī no Orusuban" (Japanese: マイキーのお留守番) | Shinsuke Tachikawa | Sakichi Sato | September 27, 2003 |
James and Barbara are going to a wedding ceremony while Mikey stays at home, and they tell him not to open the door for anybody. After Mikey answers twice to false delivery calls and gets scolded by his parents, he resolves not to open the door, even when he hears Emily, Tony, Charles, and his parents. When he is finally convinced, he finds Laura on his doorstep, who had returned to Japan and fabricated the voices.

=== Season 6 (2004) ===
The sixth season, titled Oh! Mikey 6th in Japan, was broadcast beginning April 3, 2004 to June 26, 2004, on TV Tokyo, TV Setouchi, TV Aichi, TV Osaka, TV Hokkaido, and TVQ Kyushu for 13 episodes. A DVD compiling the episodes was released on December 3, 2004.

| No. | Title | Directed by | Written by | Original release date |
|---|---|---|---|---|
| 66 | "Let's Enjoy Life"; Transliteration: "Jinsei wa Tanoshimō" (Japanese: 人生は楽しもう) | Shinsuke Tachikawa | Yōko Nakanishi | April 3, 2004 |
Mikey wants to finish a book, but James and Barbara send him to bed so they can have sex, lying that he needs to take his time to enjoy the story. Mikey is unable to sleep and demands a bedtime story. Barbara is unable to tell a story he enjoys, and when she finally makes one up, he becomes so bored that he falls asleep, giving his parents time to spend with each other.
| 67 | "Run, Mikey, Run!"; Transliteration: "Hashire Maikī" (Japanese: 走れマイキー！) | Shinsuke Tachikawa | Yoshimasa Ishibashi, Midori Sugioka | April 10, 2004 |
Laura invites Mikey to eat at a cafe, but neither of them are able to pay the bill. Mikey leaves her at the cafe while he returns home for money. When Emily invites him to eat at a cafe, he forgets about Laura and eats at another cafe with her. The same situation happens, and when Mikey returns home for money, he meets Barbara, who invites him to eat at a cafe. Again, Mikey forgets about Emily as he accepts Barbara's invitation.
| 68 | "Laura the Hypnotist"; Transliteration: "Saimin Jutsu-shi Rōra" (Japanese: 催眠術師ローラ) | Shinsuke Tachikawa | Sakichi Sato | April 17, 2004 |
Laura reads a book about hypnotism and attempts to hypnotize Mikey and Emily. The hypnotism is successful on Mikey, and he obeys various commands such as imitating an animal and dancing. When Emily suggests they stop, Laura mentions she is unable to bring Mikey back to normal because she has not finished the book. The two girls decide to go to a cafe and leave Mikey dancing in the park.
| 69 | "Emily's Birthday"; Transliteration: "Emirī-chan no Tanjōbi" (Japanese: エミリーちゃんの誕生日) | Shinsuke Tachikawa | Sakichi Sato | April 24, 2004 |
With Emily's birthday approaching, Mikey seeks advice from James and Barbara on what present to give her as her boyfriend. James and Barbara get into an altercation about the quality of James' gifts in the past, but they make up by having sex later that night, with Barbara claiming that he is her best present. This gives Mikey the idea to give himself to Emily as a present, but she is disgusted, as she had expected a designer handbag, and the two get into an altercation as well.
| 70 | "Mikey Runs Away!"; Transliteration: "Maikī no Iede" (Japanese: マイキーの家出) | Shinsuke Tachikawa | Junichi Furukawa | May 1, 2004 |
Mikey runs away from home after Barbara refuses to give him extra allowance. James follows Mikey to make sure he's properly run away, and in teaching him how to do so, the two end up traveling in circles. By the time they reunite with Barbara, Mikey decides he wants to return home, but James and Barbara decide that they will continue running away to enjoy their time alone.
| 71 | "Spinner"; Transliteration: "Mawari-kun no Tomodachi" (Japanese: マワリ君の友達) | Shinsuke Tachikawa | Yoshimasa Ishibashi | May 8, 2004 |
While practicing for a soccer match, Mikey meets a Japanese transfer student named Spinner, who keeps spinning in circles. Spinner confesses he has trouble making friends, so Mikey feels sorry for him and introduces him to his friends. Spinner's spinning blows them away, and Mikey escapes home. Once Spinner finds him, Mikey is blown away when he tries to reconcile. Spinner decides that he and Mikey are not compatible and calls off their friendship.
| 72 | "Dad's Youth"; Transliteration: "Papa no Seishun" (Japanese: パパの青春) | Shinsuke Tachikawa | Sakichi Sato | May 15, 2004 |
James has a mid-life crisis, and while reminiscing his childhood on his way to work, he finds Christina as her child self. James spends time with her as his child self, but he realizes Mikey and Barbara are important to him and wants to return to reality. When he returns home, Mikey and Barbara scold him for skipping work and he regrets his decision.
| 73 | "Mikey and Emily's Big Fight"; Transliteration: "Maikī to Emirī no Ōgenka" (Japanese: マイキーとエミリーの大ゲンカ) | Shinsuke Tachikawa | Sakichi Sato | May 22, 2004 |
Emily is 10 minutes late to her date with Mikey, and when she arrives, Mikey makes her feel better by saying he arrived 10 seconds earlier. This causes Emily to complain that Mikey is late, and the two exchange blows to make their debts even. James and Barbara observe them and comment on how similar their relationships are before getting into a physical altercation to make their debts even.
| 74 | "Emily the Imposter"; Transliteration: "Nise Emirī-chan" (Japanese: にせエミリーちゃん) | Shinsuke Tachikawa | Sakichi Sato | May 29, 2004 |
Romeo attacks Emily for insulting Mikey and steals her outfit, disguising himself as Emily while leaving her with his clothes. Mikey spends time with Romeo until Emily confronts him. Though Mikey realizes Emily and Romeo switched clothes, he decides he prefers Romeo's company, as he is kinder than the real Emily.
| 75 | "Clare's Love"; Transliteration: "Kurea no Koi" (Japanese: クレアの恋) | Shinsuke Tachikawa | Yoshimasa Ishibashi | June 5, 2004 |
Mikey becomes attracted to Clare, a new transfer student, and begins hanging out with her over Emily. Emily ends their relationship, and Mikey realizes that she is more important to him than Clare. Laura, who witnessed the falling out, kicks a soccer ball into Mikey and Clare. Tracy appears to give Mikey advice and praise to Laura, but Laura kicks a soccer ball into her as well.
| 76 | "Mikey the Delinquent"; Transliteration: "Gureta Maikī" (Japanese: グレたマイキー) | Shinsuke Tachikawa | Sakichi Sato | June 12, 2004 |
Tired of James and Barbara constantly fighting, Mikey turns into a delinquent, but that causes their altercations to get worse. Mikey turns back to normal, apologizing and begging them to stop fighting. James and Barbara tell Mikey that this is how married couples communicate, and they resolve their problems. However, the two begin fighting again, and Mikey resigns to the fact that he is unable to stop them.
| 77 | "Getting Rid of an Unwanted Son"; Transliteration: "Iranai Musuko wa Poi!" (Japanese: いらない息子はポイ！) | Shinsuke Tachikawa | Sakichi Sato | June 19, 2004 |
Mikey refuses to eat vegetables, so James and Barbara replace him with a new son named Mac. Desperate to win his family back, Mikey finishes a plate full of vegetables. James and Barbara reveal that it was a prank to get him to eat vegetables. Mac, however, accidentally reveals he is James' illegitimate son with one of his mistresses.
| 78 | "Mikey in the Box"; Transliteration: "Hako no Naka no Maikī" (Japanese: 箱の中のマイキー) | Shinsuke Tachikawa | Sakichi Sato | June 26, 2004 |
On his way to meet with Emily, Mikey follows signs with red arrows that lead him to a yellow box, which teleports him inside the box when he picks it up. The same thing happens to Emily, James, and Barbara when they look for Mikey. As they figure a way out, one of the signs falls on the box and squishes it flat.

=== Season 7 (2005) ===
The seventh season, titled Oh! Mikey 7th in Japan, was broadcast from January 13, 2005, to April 6, 2005, on TV Tokyo for 13 episodes. It was later released on DVD on April 29, 2005.

| No. | Title | Directed by | Written by | Original release date |
|---|---|---|---|---|
| 79 | "Don't Snore in Bed"; Transliteration: "Beddo de Ibiki wa Kakanaide" (Japanese: ベッドでイビキはかかないで) | Shinsuke Tachikawa | Sakichi Sato | January 13, 2005 |
James and Barbara are unable to sleep because the other is snoring. When one of them wakes up to the snoring, they push the other off the bed and then return to sleep, causing the cycle to continue. The pushing escalates to bludgeoning, and when Mikey wakes up the next morning, he finds both parents with facial injuries.
| 80 | "Dad the Kid General"; Transliteration: "Papa wa Gaki Taishō" (Japanese: パパはガキ大将) | Shinsuke Tachikawa | Junichi Furukawa | January 20, 2005 |
Mikey gets into a fight with Emily and upsets her, causing his parents to scold him for not being manly. James shows off his masculinity by telling Mikey he used to be the leader of the boys when he was little, and while they go shopping together, he runs into Steve, an old classmate. Steve's attitude towards James reveals that James was actually cowardly as a child, but he continues to lie about it to Mikey and tricks Steve into praising him.
| 81 | "Mikey Has a Close Call"; Transliteration: "Maikī Kiki Ippatsu" (Japanese: マイキー危機一髪) | Shinsuke Tachikawa | Sakichi Sato | January 27, 2005 |
While out on an errand, Mikey finds a cream puff on the ground and eats it. He suddenly gets diarrhea and rushes home as fast as he can while turning down the twins, Tony and Charles, and Emily. When he reaches his house, his parents cannot unlock the front door because they have lost the key, causing Mikey to collapse and defecate in his pants.
| 82 | "Mikey Gets a Rival"; Transliteration: "Maikī wa Raibaru" (Japanese: マイキーはライバル) | Shinsuke Tachikawa | Yoshimasa Ishibashi, Junichi Furukawa | February 2, 2005 |
Emily introduces Nick, a new transfer student, to Mikey, but when they play together, Nick becomes obsessively competitive towards Mikey, to the point of danger. When Mikey reveals he is Emily's boyfriend, Nick begins competing against him over Emily's affections. Emily picks neither of them and leaves them in the park to argue with each other.
| 83 | "Clare's Pure Love"; Transliteration: "Kurea no Jun Ai" (Japanese: クレアの純愛) | Shinsuke Tachikawa | Yoshimasa Ishibashi | February 9, 2005 |
The episode "Mikey Has a Close Call" is retold from Clare's perspective, where she stalks him and watches him lovingly from afar for the entire day. By the time Mikey reaches his house, Laura subdues Clare by kicking her down.
| 84 | "More from Mikey's Rival"; Transliteration: "Maikī wa Motto Raibaru" (Japanese: マイキーはもっとライバル) | Shinsuke Tachikawa | Junichi Furukawa | February 16, 2005 |
Nick visits Mikey's home and competes against him in everything. Mikey tricks him into going home, but upon going to his room, he finds that Nick is already there.
| 85 | "Mikey's Ghost Photo"; Transliteration: "Maikī no Shinrei Shashin" (Japanese: マイキーの心霊写真) | Shinsuke Tachikawa | Sakichi Sato | February 23, 2005 |
Emily turns down Laura to take photos of Mikey with her mother's old Polaroid camera. One of the photos reveals a ghastly figure behind Mikey, to which Laura claims is a ghost. To exorcise the ghost, Laura throws pies at Mikey while Emily throws water on him while he is undressed. When they take a photo again, the ghost is no longer seen. Mikey and Emily invite Laura to take a photo with them, but she declines; however, later they discover she appears in their group photo.
| 86 | "The Mysterious Shut-in"; Transliteration: "Nazo no Hikkī-kun" (Japanese: 謎のヒッキー君) | Shinsuke Tachikawa | Sakichi Sato | March 2, 2005 |
Emily introduces her cousin, Shut-in, to Mikey, who has never shown his face in public. Mikey tries to convince Shut-in to leave his house to play with them, but Shut-in refuses. Mikey and Emily enter his house to personally drag him out, but Shut-in evades them and finally leaves through a car.
| 87 | "Mikey's Attorney"; Transliteration: "Maikī no Bengonin" (Japanese: マイキーの弁護人) | Shinsuke Tachikawa | Sakichi Sato | March 9, 2005 |
Mikey finds Howard collapsed on the road and gives him Laura's cookies. In gratitude for saving him, he becomes Mikey's personal lawyer, quickly coming to his defense when Laura becomes angry Mikey fed him her cookies and when Brown accuses him of not returning his photo book. James and Barbara are against Howard staying at their home until he distracts them by revealing that Mikey may not be blood-related to one of them, causing the parents to fight.
| 88 | "Dad's Boss Arrives"; Transliteration: "Papa no Jōshi ga Yattekita" (Japanese: パパの上司がやってきた) | Shinsuke Tachikawa | Sakichi Sato | March 16, 2005 |
The Fuccons' dinner outing is interrupted by James' boss, Nakajima, who imposes on James and forces him to submit to his demands, such as having dinner prepared by Barbara and receiving a kiss from her. Barbara learns that Nakajima is only a manager at James' company, and James is actually his boss, having mixed up the Japanese words for "manager" and "chief director". This causes James and Barbara to beat him up, while Mikey reveals he had known what the words meant the entire time.
| 89 | "Afternoon Suspense"; Transliteration: "Gogo no Sasupensu" (Japanese: 午後のサスペンス) | Shinsuke Tachikawa | Koichi Emura | March 23, 2005 |
Barbara returns home to find that the house has been ransacked, with an expensive necklace she had bought missing, but she opts not to report the police to avoid James discovering the necklace. As she searches for it, she finds Mikey, Laura, and Emily nearly unconscious. After Mikey disappears, Barbara looks for him outside and finds out from a jewelry salesman that she had forgotten to take the necklace home with her. Meanwhile, the mess in the house is revealed to be caused by Laura, Emily, Mikey, and James drinking alcohol in secret.
| 90 | "Baseball Fanatic: Teacher Bob"; Transliteration: "Yakyū Baka Bobu-sensei" (Japanese: 野球バカ ボブ先生) | Shinsuke Tachikawa | Midori Sugioka | March 30, 2005 |
In preparation for a baseball match at school, Teacher Bob trains Mikey in baseball using his childhood baseball. Mikey accidentally throws the ball into a house and is sent to retrieve it alone. The owner allows him to choose between a gold or silver baseball. Mikey answers honestly, and he is invited to eat sushi. When Mikey returns to Teacher Bob, he realizes he forgot to bring the ball back with him and enters the house once again. After answering honestly again, Mikey is invited to spend time with geisha and forgets about the ball altogether.
| 91 | "The Morning Mikey Died"; Transliteration: "Maikī no Shinda Asa" (Japanese: マイキーの死んだ朝) | Shinsuke Tachikawa | Sakichi Sato | April 6, 2005 |
While running late to school, Mikey runs a red light and is hit by a car, re-emerging as a ghost. Emily mourns his death, while Tony and Charles greet Mikey, but they leave for school anyway. Emily decides to return while Tony and Charles bring Barbara, and Barbara convinces them that Mikey may be faking his death to skip school. Mikey comes back to life to argue that he isn't, reaffirming their suspicions. While Emily leaves angrily, Mikey warns the viewers to be careful when crossing streets.

=== Season 8 (2005) ===
The eighth season, titled Oh! Mikey 8th in Japan, was broadcast from April 11, 2005, to July 11, 2005, on TV Tokyo for 12 episodes. (Note: TV Tokyo lists the broadcast date for episode 1 as April 10, 2005 at 28:00, which is April 11, 2005 at 4:00 AM.) It was later released on DVD on December 3, 2005.

| No. | Title | Directed by | Written by | Original release date |
|---|---|---|---|---|
| 92 | "Family Vacation"; Transliteration: "Kazoku Ryokō" (Japanese: 家族旅行) | Shinsuke Tachikawa | Sakichi Sato | April 11, 2005 |
| 93 | "Emily's Boyfriend"; Transliteration: "Emirī no Bōifurendo" (Japanese: エミリーのボーイフレンド) | Shinsuke Tachikawa | Yoshimasa Ishibashi, Junichi Furukawa | April 18, 2005 |
| 94 | "Laura Meets God"; Transliteration: "Rōra Kami-sama to Deau" (Japanese: ローラ神様と出会う) | Shinsuke Tachikawa | Sakichi Sato | April 25, 2005 |
| 95 | "Why VS Shut-in"; Transliteration: "Nande-kun VS Hikkī-kun" (Japanese: ナンデ君VSヒッキー君) | Shinsuke Tachikawa | Sakichi Sato | May 2, 2005 |
| 96 | "Reuniting With Jack"; Transliteration: "Jakku to no Saikai" (Japanese: ジャックとの再会) | Shinsuke Tachikawa | Midori Sugioka | May 9, 2005 |
| 97 | "Welcome to Nick's House"; Transliteration: "Nikku-ke e Yōkoso" (Japanese: ニック家へようこそ) | Shinsuke Tachikawa | Yoshimasa Ishibashi, Junichi Furukawa | May 16, 2005 |
| 98 | "Mikey's Friendship"; Transliteration: "Maikī no Yūjō" (Japanese: マイキーの友情) | Shinsuke Tachikawa | Atsumu Watanabe | May 23, 2005 |
| 99 | "Mikey the Genius"; Transliteration: "Tensai Maikī" (Japanese: 天才マイキー) | Shinsuke Tachikawa | Sakichi Sato | June 6, 2005 |
| 100 | "Laura Gets Hospitalized"; Transliteration: "Rōra no Nyūin" (Japanese: ローラの入院) | Yoshimasa Ishibashi | Yoshimasa Ishibashi, Sakichi Sato | June 13, 2005 |
| 101 | "Poor at Essays"; Transliteration: "Sakubun wa Nigate" (Japanese: 作文は苦手) | Shinsuke Tachikawa | Yoshimasa Ishibashi, Midori Sugioka | June 20, 2005 |
| 102 | "Rockwell the Demon Officer"; Transliteration: "Oni Keikan Rokku'ueru" (Japanese: 鬼警官ロックウェル) | Shinsuke Tachikawa | Sakichi Sato | June 27, 2005 |
| 103 | "Goodbye Ring"; Transliteration: "Bai Bai Ringu" (Japanese: バイバイリング) | Shinsuke Tachikawa | Yoshimasa Ishibashi, Koichi Emura | July 4, 2005 |
| 104 | "Mikey Goes to the Edo Period"; Transliteration: "Maikī no Edo Jidai" (Japanese: マイキーの江戸時代) | Shinsuke Tachikawa | Yoshmasa Ishibashi | July 11, 2005 |

=== Hard Core (2005) ===
Oh! Mikey Hard Core was released direct-to-DVD on August 26, 2005.

| No. | Title | Directed by | Written by | Original release date |
|---|---|---|---|---|
| 1 | "Mikey's Diary"; Transliteration: "Maikī no Nikki" (Japanese: マイキーの日記) | Shinsuke Tachikawa | Sakichi Sato | August 26, 2005 |
Barbara finds a diary in Mikey's room, which consists of plans to kill his parents. In panic, James and Barbara they offer Mikey anything he wants to appease him. After Mikey agrees to let them take him to an amusement park, he tells them that the diary belongs to Laura, to which James and Barbara decide to take back their words. That evening, Mikey writes plans to kill his parents in his diary.
| 2 | "Exam Room of Love"; Transliteration: "Ai no Shinsashitsu" (Japanese: 愛の診察室♥️) | Shinsuke Tachikawa | Yoshimasa Ishibashi | August 26, 2005 |
Tracy narrates a day in her life and discusses her other occupations, including doctor, construction worker, and convenience store manager, but instead of focusing on her job, she seduces her clients while giving life lessons in love that only marginally relate to her work.
| 3 | "The Kawakita Family's Marital Dispute"; Transliteration: "Kawakita-ke no Fūfu Genka" (Japanese: 川北家の夫婦ゲンカ) | Yoshimasa Ishibashi | Yoshimasa Ishibashi | August 26, 2005 |
In a parody of "A Marital Dispute", Mamoru and Nobuyo get into an altercation after disagreeing on whether Satoru should grow up to become a baseball player or a politician. Their fights cause Satoru to become a delinquent. James and Mikey witness them from afar and decide they are lucky they aren't poor.
| 4 | "Saori the Female Driver"; Transliteration: "Josei Doraibā Saori" (Japanese: 女性ドライバーさおり) | Shinsuke Tachikawa | Yoshimasa Ishibashi | August 26, 2005 |
Mikey is forced to hitchhike to Sendai to attend a wedding ceremony after James and Barbara refuse to take him along. Mikey gets a ride from a woman named Saori, but their conversation reminds him of her old lover, Mitsuo, and she decides to drive to his house to see if he misses her. Though Mikey points out Mitsuo has moved out, Saori mistakes the new tenant for Mitsuo and cries hysterically when she finds that he is married with a child. As she drives off, Mikey grows concerned about his current situation.
| 5 | "Saori the Female Driver Continued"; Transliteration: "Tsuzuki Josei Doraibā Saori" (Japanese: 続・女性ドライバーさおり) | Shinsuke Tachikawa | Yoshimasa Ishibashi | August 26, 2005 |
After Mikey calms Saori down, she begins mistaking him for Mitsuo. Mikey cries out for help as her van circles around his town, but neither his friends, Tracy, nor his parents pay attention. After several years pass, a fully grown Mikey remains trapped in her van and nurses their child.
| 6 | "Teahouse Papillon"; Transliteration: "Kissa Papiyon" (Japanese: 喫茶パピヨン) | Shinsuke Tachikawa | Yoshimasa Ishibashi, Midori Sugioka | August 26, 2005 |
Chigusa, the owner of Teahouse Papillon, hates people with bad luck and projects her personal problems onto her customers. While serving unappetizing drinks and feigning politeness, she assumes that Teacher Bob and Bob-Mama are a couple in an adulterous relationship, Tracy is unable to keep a partner despite her beauty, and that Barbara is a single mother. She then puts up a sign banning unlucky people from her teahouse.
| 7 | "Teahouse Papillon 2: The Lucky Woman"; Transliteration: "Kissa Papiyon 2: Shiawase na Onna" (Japanese: 喫茶パピヨン2 幸せな女) | Shinsuke Tachikawa | Midori Sugioka | August 26, 2005 |
Meru, Chigusa's friend from middle school, comes to Teahouse Papillon with her husband, Makoto. Chigusa is resentful that Meru lives a fulfilling life, during their conversation, Chigusa's delinquent son, Akira, barges in to steal money. Sympathetic, Meru and Makoto invite Chigusa to talk to them again. Instead, Chigusa realizes she hates lucky people the most and puts up a sign banning them from her teahouse.
| 8 | "Mikey's Future"; Transliteration: "Maikī no Mirai" (Japanese: マイキーの未来) | Shinsuke Tachikawa | Yoshimasa Ishibashi | August 26, 2005 |
While writing an essay about his future, Mikey is visited by an angel, who reveals four possible futures, all ending in misfortune: one where he is married to Emily, who does not care for him; one where he marries into Laura's wealth yet treats her terribly; one where he is married to Saori and is still trapped in her van; and one where he decides to commit suicide after losing his job and falling into debt. Mikey realizes that no matter what he does, he will end up in misfortune anyway, so he concludes he doesn't need to live his life differently at all.

=== Extra (2006) ===
Oh! Mikey Extra was released direct-to-DVD on August 25, 2006.

| No. | Title | Directed by | Written by | Original release date |
|---|---|---|---|---|
| 1 | "Mikey Travels Alone"; Transliteration: "Maikī no Hitori Tabi" (Japanese: マイキーの一人旅) | Shinsuke Tachikawa | Midori Sugioka | August 25, 2006 |
Mikey wants to go on a trip, so James and Barbara make him attend a wedding ceremony in Okayama Prefecture alone. However, they will not bring him there, so he must hitchhike. Mikey successfully gets a ride from a driver who takes him to Shizuoka Prefecture and gives him meat for his travels. Eventually, Mikey returns home, and despite never arriving in Okayama Prefecture, he has accumulated various foods from the drivers he hitched rides from.
| 2 | "Heinrich the Phantom Thief"; Transliteration: "Kaitō Hainrihhi" (Japanese: 怪盗ハインリッヒ) | Shinsuke Tachikawa | Yoshimasa Ishibashi, Rina Yonetani | August 25, 2006 |
Mikey is left at home and ordered to guard his family's valuables as James goes to work and Barbara meets with her friends for tea. Heinrich, a man who claims to be Barbara's friend, infiltrates the Fuccons' home and tricks Mikey into revealing where their valuables are. James and Barbara come home to see that their treasures have been stolen, and while seemingly complimenting Mikey at first, they become furious.
| 3 | "Another Tutor"; Transliteration: "Mou Hitori no Katei Kyōshi" (Japanese: もう一人の家庭教師) | Shinsuke Tachikawa | Midori Sugioka | August 25, 2006 |
Mikey fails his tests, and Barbara decides to hire Pierre as his new tutor. Pierre instead gives Mikey a makeover and lessons in love to be more popular with women. While Barbara spends time with Pierre, the two encounter James with Tracy. While James and Barbara argue, Pierre and Tracy hook up and have sex. Meanwhile, Emily and Laura find Mikey unattractive and reject him.
| 4 | "Mikey's Trip to Outer Space"; Transliteration: "Maikī no Uchū Ryokō" (Japanese: マイキーの宇宙旅行) | Yoshimasa Ishibashi | Yoshimasa Ishibashi | August 25, 2006 |
Footage from the art exhibit, Mikey's Attack, which took place at Kirin Plaza Osaka from December 2004 to January 2005, is broadcast, showing all mannequin displays. The beginning of the footage is overlaid with Tracy telling Mikey to play music. This is followed by an instrumental song using samples of Tracy's dialogue from ADV Films' English dub of "The Lady Tutor."
| 5 | "Mikey the Adult"; Transliteration: "Otona no Maikī" (Japanese: 大人のマイキー) | Shinsuke Tachikawa | Midori Sugioka | August 25, 2006 |
Wanting to feel like an adult, Mikey decides to spend his allowance at a sushi restaurant and eats salted salmon roe sushi. When the chef runs out of salmon roe and serves him tamago nigiri, Mikey interprets this as being treated as a child and threatens to leave. The chef bills Mikey ¥16,000. Without enough money, Mikey turns to James and Barbara for help, who have arrived in the restaurant for a date. James and Barbara tell Mikey that he must work to pay off his debt and decide to have him work more to pay for their bill as well.
| 6 | "The World's One and Only Stone"; Transliteration: "Sekai Ichi Hitotsu Dake no Ishi" (Japanese: 世界にひとつだけの石) | Shinsuke Tachikawa | Sakichi Sato | August 25, 2006 |
Laura finds a stone and tricks Mikey into paying ¥1,000 for it with Emily's help, claiming that it can grant any wish. Mikey wishes for candy and chocolate, which comes true. Laura beats him up and steals back the stone, wishing for designer products. The stone's spirit appears and tells her that the stone only grants wishes from people with pure hearts. Insulted, Laura beats him up and bribes him with ¥10,000 to make her wishes come true, as he considers taking a new part-time job.
| 7 | "The Horror! Emily's Dad"; Transliteration: "Kyōfu! Emirī-papa" (Japanese: 恐怖！エミリーパパ) | Shinsuke Tachikawa | Sakichi Sato | August 25, 2006 |
Emily wants Mikey to take her on dates in places other than the park. To prove whether he loves her, she invites him to her house to meet her father. Emily's father threatens to shoot Mikey unless he takes her to restaurants and on vacations. When Mikey runs away, it is revealed that Emily's father is Brown in disguise, having been part of Emily's plan to trick Mikey, and that their father had died before they were born.
| 8 | "Here Comes Nick's Family"; Transliteration: "Nikku-ke no Tōjō!" (Japanese: ニック家の登場) | Shinsuke Tachikawa | Yoshimasa Ishibashi, Junichi Furukawa | August 25, 2006 |
The Fuccons decide to go to the park, but they are confronted by Nick's family, who uses every opportunity to prove that they are better. When the Fuccons return home, they discover that Nick's family had beaten them there to prove they are faster. James and Barbara continue their duel from the park with Nick's parents.
| 9 | "Mikey and the Morning Glory"; Transliteration: "Maikī to Asagao" (Japanese: マイキーとあさがお) | Shinsuke Tachikawa | Yoshimasa Ishibashi, Midori Sugioka | August 25, 2006 |
Mikey is concerned that his morning glory has not sprouted, while Tony, Charles, and Emily challenge each other to a contest to see whose morning glory grows the fastest. Emily suggests that Mikey does not show his morning glory enough love, and after consulting his parents, he decides to use supplement drinks. This causes his morning glory to grow rapidly, and all four children begin bringing high nutrient food to help their morning glories grow. In the end, this causes all of their morning glories to blossom into large, towering bushes.
| 10 | "Duty and Privilege"; Transliteration: "Gimu to Kenri" (Japanese: 義務と権利) | Shinsuke Tachikawa | Yoshimasa Ishibashi, Midori Sugioka | August 25, 2006 |
Brown convinces Mikey to go on strike for a higher allowance, and he protests against his parents by not doing his homework and brushing his teeth, while his parents start to fight. Mikey's protest goes unsuccessfully, and Brown has Mikey evaluate what his duties to his family are. Mikey believes his duties are to do his homework and brush his teeth, and when he does so, his parents still fight.
| 11 | "Dad Gets Arrested"; Transliteration: "Taiho Sareta Papa" (Japanese: 逮捕されたパパ) | Shinsuke Tachikawa | Sakichi Sato | August 25, 2006 |
While doing laundry, Barbara finds lipstick stains on James' clothes. Later, James is arrested by a masked detective and brought in for questioning. The detective, who is Barbara in disguise, threatens him with a gun. James confesses to multiple misdemeanors but remains clueless about his infidelity accusations, even when Barbara reveals her true identity. Barbara then shoots James in the head and he forced to do laundry from then on.
| 12 | "Farewell, Dad"; Transliteration: "Sayonara Papa" (Japanese: さよならパパ) | Shinsuke Tachikawa | Sakichi Sato | August 25, 2006 |
As a prank, Emily tells Mikey that she is breaking up with him to be with James. Mikey arrives home in tears, and furious, he and Barbara kick James out of the house. James finds Emily crying, overcome with guilt, and he consoles her. Unfortunately, Mikey and Barbara mistake him for advancing on Emily and rescue her from him by kicking him down. Emily and Mikey become a couple again.
| 13 | "Mikey the Starman"; Transliteration: "Maikī za Sutāman" (Japanese: マイキー・ザ･スターマン) | Yoshimasa Ishibashi | Yoshimasa Ishibashi | August 25, 2006 |
Six aliens, all resembling Mikey, are sent to Earth. They encounter Laura and Emily, both who believe Mikey has been abducted by aliens after not showing up in school for the past week. Laura gets angry when the aliens say they prefer Emily, and before they abduct them, the girls leave. The aliens then encounter James and Barbara, who are able to speak the alien language and invite Mikey to eat sushi with them.

=== Fever (2007) ===
A film titled Oh! Mikey Fever premiered through a limited theater screening in Tokyo and Osaka on December 1, 2007. It was later released on DVD on February 22, 2008.

| No. | Title | Directed by | Written by | Original release date |
|---|---|---|---|---|
| 1 | "Saturday Night Mikey"; Transliteration: "Satadē Naito Maikī" (Japanese: サタデーナイト・マイキー) | Yoshimasa Ishibashi | Unknown | December 1, 2007 |
| 2 | "Roots of the Fuccon Family"; Transliteration: "Rūtsu Obu Fūkon Famirī" (Japanese: ルーツ・オブ・フーコンファミリー) | Yoshimasa Ishibashi | Unknown | December 1, 2007 |
| 3 | "Devil Angel Nicola"; Transliteration: "Akuma Tenshi Nikora" (Japanese: 悪魔天使ニコラ) | Yoshimasa Ishibashi | Unknown | December 1, 2007 |
| 4 | "Let's Go to the Department Store!"; Transliteration: "Depāto e Ikō!" (Japanese: デパートへ行こう！) | Yoshimasa Ishibashi | Unknown | December 1, 2007 |
| 5 | "A World Unknown to Mom"; Transliteration: "Mama no Shiranai Sekai" (Japanese: ママの知らない世界) | Yoshimasa Ishibashi | Unknown | December 1, 2007 |
| 6 | "Take Responsibility, Mikey!"; Transliteration: "Maikī yo Sekinin o Tore!" (Japanese: マイキーよ 責任をとれ！) | Yoshimasa Ishibashi | Unknown | December 1, 2007 |
| 7 | "Arranging a Marriage for Satoru Kawakita"; Transliteration: "Kawakita Satoru no Omiai" (Japanese: 川北覚のお見合い) | Yoshimasa Ishibashi | Unknown | December 1, 2007 |
| 8 | "Mikey's Christmas"; Transliteration: "Maikī no Kurisumasu" (Japanese: マイキーのクリスマス) | Yoshimasa Ishibashi | Unknown | December 1, 2007 |
| 9 | "Mikey the Starman 2: World Domination"; Transliteration: "Maikī za Sutāman 2: Chikyū Seifuku" (Japanese: マイキー・ザ・スターマン2地球征服) | Yoshimasa Ishibashi | Unknown | December 1, 2007 |

=== Romance (2010) ===
Oh! Mikey Romance was released direct-to-DVD on December 3, 2010, to celebrate the series' 10th anniversary.

| No. | Title | Directed by | Written by | Original release date |
|---|---|---|---|---|
| 1 | "Dad's Mistress"; Transliteration: "Papa no Uwaki Aite" (Japanese: パパの浮気相手) | Yoshimasa Ishibashi | Yoshimasa Ishibashi | December 3, 2010 |
| 2 | "Emily's First Love"; Transliteration: "Emirī no Hatsukoi" (Japanese: エミリーの初恋) | Yoshimasa Ishibashi | Yoshimasa Ishibashi | December 3, 2010 |
| 3 | "Laura Becomes Mikey"; Transliteration: "Maikī ni Natta Rōra" (Japanese: マイキーになったローラ) | Yoshimasa Ishibashi | Yoshimasa Ishibashi | December 3, 2010 |
| 4 | "Mikey's Best Friend, Ronaldo"; Transliteration: "Maikī no Shinyū, Ronaudo" (Japanese: マイキーの親友、ロナウド) | Yoshimasa Ishibashi | Yoshimasa Ishibashi | December 3, 2010 |
| 5 | "Mikey's Ransom"; Transliteration: "Maikī no Minoshirokin" (Japanese: マイキーの身代金) | Yoshimasa Ishibashi | Yoshimasa Ishibashi | December 3, 2010 |
| 6 | "Dad's Little Brother, Edward"; Transliteration: "Papa no Otōto, Edowādo" (Japanese: パパの弟、エドワード) | Yoshimasa Ishibashi | Yoshimasa Ishibashi | December 3, 2010 |
| 7 | "Nicola, Again"; Transliteration: "Nikora, Futatabi" (Japanese: ニコラ、再び) | Yoshimasa Ishibashi | Yoshimasa Ishibashi | December 3, 2010 |
| 8 | "Here Comes Wakaru"; Transliteration: "Wakaru-san Tōjō" (Japanese: ワカルさん登場) | Yoshimasa Ishibashi | Yoshimasa Ishibashi | December 3, 2010 |
| 9 | "Laura's Fiance, Barbon"; Transliteration: "Rōra no Konyakusha, Barubon" (Japanese: ローラの婚約者、バルボン) | Yoshimasa Ishibashi | Yoshimasa Ishibashi | December 3, 2010 |
| 10 | "Yochiko Loves Japan!"; Transliteration: "Nippon Daisuki! Yochiko" (Japanese: ニッポン大好き！ヨチ子) | Yoshimasa Ishibashi | Yoshimasa Ishibashi | December 3, 2010 |
