= The Fuccons =

2002–2005 Japanese television comedy series

- Left to right: Barbara Fuccon, Blueberry King, Mikey Fuccon, James Fuccon from the episode "Rags to Riches"
- Kanji: オー!マイキー
- Genre: Black comedy, surreal comedy
- Created by: Yoshimasa Ishibashi
- Written by: Yoshimasa Ishibashi; Sakichi Sato; Midori Sugioka (2003-2007); Junichi Furukawa (2004-2006)
- Directed by: Yoshimasa Ishibashi; Shinsuke Tachikawa (2003-2006)
- Starring: Chika; Hitoshi Tatano; Urara Omote
- Composer: Tetsujiro Suita
- Country of origin: Japan
- No. of seasons: 8
- No. of episodes: 104 (list of episodes)

Production
- Producers: Naoko Oguchi; Masami Yanagihara; Yoko Nakanishi
- Running time: 3 minutes
- Production companies: SSM; TV Tokyo; Ishibashi Productions

Original release
- Network: TV Tokyo
- Release: January 6, 2002 – July 11, 2005

The Fuccons (/ˈfuːˌkɒns/), known as Oh! Mikey (オー！マイキー, Ō! Maikī) in Japan, is a Japanese sketch comedy series created by Yoshimasa Ishibashi. It features the Fuccons, a family of American expatriates living in Japan, with characters played by mannequins filmed at various locations in real-time.

The Fuccons first aired as recurring sketches titled The Fuccon Family (フーコン・ファミリー, Fūkon Famirī) on the Japanese sketch comedy series Vermilion Pleasure Night in 2000, which was also produced by Ishibashi. In January 2002, the series moved to its own late-night time slot and was broadcast until 2005 for a total of eight seasons. Throughout its broadcast, a 2003 film titled Wah! Mikey Returns was released in theaters. Following its release, four more series was released direct-to-video as well as the 2007 theatrical film Oh! Mikey Fever.

Both The Fuccon Family and The Fuccons were screened at various film festivals overseas, where news of the series was spread on the Internet through word-of-mouth, gaining a cult following. ADV Films licensed the first four seasons for North American distribution with an English dub, which was later broadcast on Anime Network and G4 as part of G4's Late Night Peepshow.

== Overview ==
The Fuccons is centered on Mikey Fuccon, an American expatriate who has moved to Japan after his father's job transfer. All the characters are depicted as mannequins filmed in various locations in real-time, while dressed up in post-World War II fashion. The mannequins' movements are minimal, limiting movement to uncomplicated actions, and their poses change off-camera. Voice acting and camera angles are used to convey the story.

The episodes feature non sequitur dialogue and occasionally include surreal humor, with every episode ending with all characters laughing. The characters usually face conflict in bizarre, outlandish situations in non-continuous storylines. The original Fuccon Family sketches on Vermilion Pleasure Night were described as James and Barbara constantly arguing and threatening to kill each other with "giant smiles" on their faces, while bonding over sex and tormenting Mikey. Mikey encounters problems of his own such as being neglected by his parents, being kidnapped, or being possessed by a demon, to varying degrees of absurdity. Each episode is approximately 3 minutes.

== Characters ==
=== Main characters ===
Michael "Mikey" Fuccon
Voiced by: Chika (child), Yoshimasa Ishibashi (adult), (Japanese); Andrea Kwan (BIFF), Kira Vincent-Davis (ADV Films) (English)
Mikey is a 3rd-grade elementary school student with an innocent and naive personality. He is 8 years old. He attends an international school in Japan, and while he enjoys soccer, he cannot swim. Mikey often ends up in bizarre situations, to where he is mostly portrayed as a comedic victim to various plots in the show, in part due to his gullible nature. He has a cheerful personality, which makes him popular with his friends.
James Fuccon
Voiced by: Hitoshi Tatano (Japanese); Michael Szuc (BIFF), Rob Mungle (ADV Films) (English)
James is Mikey's father and a salaryman whose job transfer to Tokyo caused the family to relocate. He is 40 years old. James is very supportive of Mikey but often suggests outlandish ideas for the family, and he has taken a 50-year loan on his house. He has a cheerful, carefree personality and laughs to evade situations. While James is happily married to Barbara, he is not above having extramarital affairs, one notably being with a Japanese secretary. In the original Fuccon Family sketches, James often argues with Barbara but bonds with her over sex and neglecting Mikey.
Barbara Fuccon
Voiced by: Urara Omote (Japanese); Jessica Caplan (BIFF), Christine M. Auten (ADV Films) (English)
Barbara is Mikey's mother. She is 34 or 36 years old. Most of her dialogue consists of her bossing Mikey around, though she is more practical than James. She believes the world is centered on her and laughs to evade situations. While Barbara is happily married to James, she is not above having extramarital affairs and has done so twice. In the original Fuccon Family sketches, Barbara often argues with James but bonds with him over sex and neglecting Mikey.

=== Recurring characters ===
Laura
Voiced by: Yuki Nakaya (Japanese); Luci Christian (ADV Films) (English)
Laura is Mikey's manipulative cousin from the United States who is approaching her "rebellious period." She is never pleased with the events around her and often amuses herself at someone's expense to sate her own boredom, She often plays pranks on Mikey, but she later realizes she is in love with him and refuses to leave Japan in order to stay by his side. Whenever she is upset with him, she often threatens to return to the United States. Despite only being 12 years old, Laura speaks maturely and is also up-to-date on new cafes opening. Her mother is James' sister, Mary.
Emily
Voiced by: Motomi Ishiyama (Japanese); Cynthia Martinez (ADV Films) (English)
Emily is Mikey's girlfriend. She has a strong sense of justice and is the most popular girl in Mikey's class. Emily is also the class president and is known to be the prettiest girl in his class. While Emily is friendly to Mikey, their relationship is always disrupted. She also manipulates Mikey out of her own selfishness at times, just to test his feelings for her. She is 8 years old.
Tony and Charles
Voiced by: Tomomi Tada (Japanese); Shannon Emerick (ADV Films) (English)
Tony and Charles are British identical twin brothers and Mikey's classmates. At 8 years old, Tony is the older twin, while Charles is the younger twin. Tony and Charles repeat each other's words, until one of them contradicts the other, which results in an argument between them. Tony and Charles' mother, Elena, has a twin sister named Helena, and they also communicate in the same ways as Tony and Charles.
Teacher Bob
Voiced by: Hitoshi Tatano (Japanese); Jay Hickman (ADV Films) (English)
Teacher Bob is Mikey's 28-year-old homeroom teacher, who is so shy he often communicates by whispering in his mother's ears and having her interpret for him. Because of his close relationship with his mother, he is a mama's boy. Teacher Bob enjoys Chinese noodles and is unwilling to compromise on them.
Bob-Mama
Voiced by: Urara Omote (Japanese); Laura Chapman (ADV Films) (English)
Bob-Mama is Teacher Bob's mother, who always accompanies him to interpret his speech, even when she is having a conversation with him.
Brown
Voiced by: Kazuaki Oda (Japanese); Robert Anderson (ADV Films) (English)
Brown is Emily's older brother and is 15 years old, who plans on becoming a film director when he gets older. Because of his close relationship with Emily, he often participates in her schemes to manipulate Mikey.
Tracy
Voiced by: Mari Yanagimori (Japanese); Jessica Caplan (BIFF), Kate Revnel Smith (ADV Films) (English)
Tracy (also spelled "Tracey" in ADV Films' releases) is Mikey's 25-year-old private tutor, who is sexually attractive and draws attention from others with her appearance. Her dialogue is suggestive and seductive. Throughout the series, Tracy gives Mikey life lessons in love.
Satoru Kawakita (川北 覚, Kawakita Satoru)
Voiced by: Chika (Japanese); Tiffany Grant (ADV Films) (English)
Satoru is an 8-year-old boy from Kyoto whose family relocated to Mikey's town. His family is poor, and while they cannot afford the toys he wants, he has a forward and honest personality. His parents are often neglectful of him, and his family holds nihilistic views.
Mamoru Kawakita (川北 守, Kawakita Mamoru)
Voiced by: Hitoshi Tatano (Japanese); Chris Patton (ADV Films) (English)
Mamoru is Satoru's 40-year-old father. Mamoru is a skilled chef, but he is currently unemployed because he is addicted to alcohol.
Nobuyo Kawakita (川北 信代, Kawakita Nobuyo)
Voiced by: Urara Omote (Japanese); Monica Rial (ADV Films) (English)
Nobuyo is Satoru's 34-year-old mother. Prior to marriage, she worked at an izakaya as a signboard girl to attract customers. Because the Kawakitas are poor, she tries to manage their budget.

=== Minor characters ===
Christina
Voiced by: Unknown (Japanese); Kelly Manison (ADV Films) (English)
Christina is a 40-year-old woman who attended Virginia High School in South Carolina with James. Both of them have known each other since they were children and consider each other their childhood sweethearts. She is Emily's mother.
The Blueberry King
Voiced by: Keishiro Tamura (Japanese); Chris Patton (ADV Films) (English)
The Blueberry King is the reigning sovereign of the Blueberry Kingdom, a wealthy country that produces oil and has a gold mountain range. He offers to betroth Mikey to his daughter, Isabella, and make him the prince of the Blueberry Kingdom for helping him.
Isabella
Voiced by: Mitsuki Mori (Japanese); Nancy Novotny (ADV Films) (English)
Isabella is the princess of the Blueberry Kingdom and the Blueberry King's daughter, who is featured in a story arc in which Mikey becomes engaged to marry her. She later breaks off their engagement under the impression Mikey is cheating on her.
Time Boy (タイム君, Taimu-kun)
Voiced by: Urara Omote (Japanese); Mark X. Laskowski (ADV Films) (English)
Time Boy is a transfer student in Mikey's class who is obsessed with following a schedule. His father runs a clock shop and his mother was a former timekeeper.
Why (ナンデ君, Nande-kun)
Voiced by: Yukiko Kurimoto (Japanese); Tiffany Grant (ADV Films) (English)
Why, whose real name is Nande (南出), is a transfer student in Mikey's class who keeps asking questions about everything.
Grandpa and Grandma
Voiced by: Toshiya Fujisawa and Yuki Nakaya (Japanese); Rik Thomas and Diana Bruce (BIFF), Andy McAvin and Melinda DeKay (ADV Films) (English)
Grandpa and Grandma are Mikey's paternal grandparents. The two are forgetful and have been that way since James was born, making it difficult to hold conversations with them.
Romeo
Voiced by: Mari Yanagimori
Romeo is Emily and Brown's little brother who is studying abroad in Italy. He is hostile towards women but loves men and is aggressive in his romantic pursuits. As a result, he falls in love with Mikey and James.
Clare
Voiced by: Mari Yanagimori
Clare is a transfer student in Mikey's class. While she has a quiet and unassuming demeanor, she has a habit of stalking others. She falls in love with Mikey and fiercely pursues him in spite of him having Emily as his girlfriend.
Nick
Voiced by: Yuka Itaha
Nick is a transfer student in Mikey's class who views him as a rival and competes against him in everything. His competitive behavior also extends to his parents, who compete against James and Barbara in everything as well.
Shut-in (ヒッキーくん, Hikkī-kun)
Voiced by: Chie Nanami
Shut-in is Emily and Brown's cousin. Since his birth, he has never shown his face in public. To travel outside, he rides in a car.
Saori (さおり)
Voiced by: Motomi Ishiyama
Saori is a woman who offers Mikey a ride when he hitchhikes. She is still heartbroken over her break-up with her ex-lover, Mitsuo.
Mikey the Starmen
Voiced by: Yoshimasa Ishibashi
The Starmen are seven alien brothers who have come to Earth to explore human life, and they have all taken on Mikey's appearance. They speak in unintelligible babbles.

== Production ==
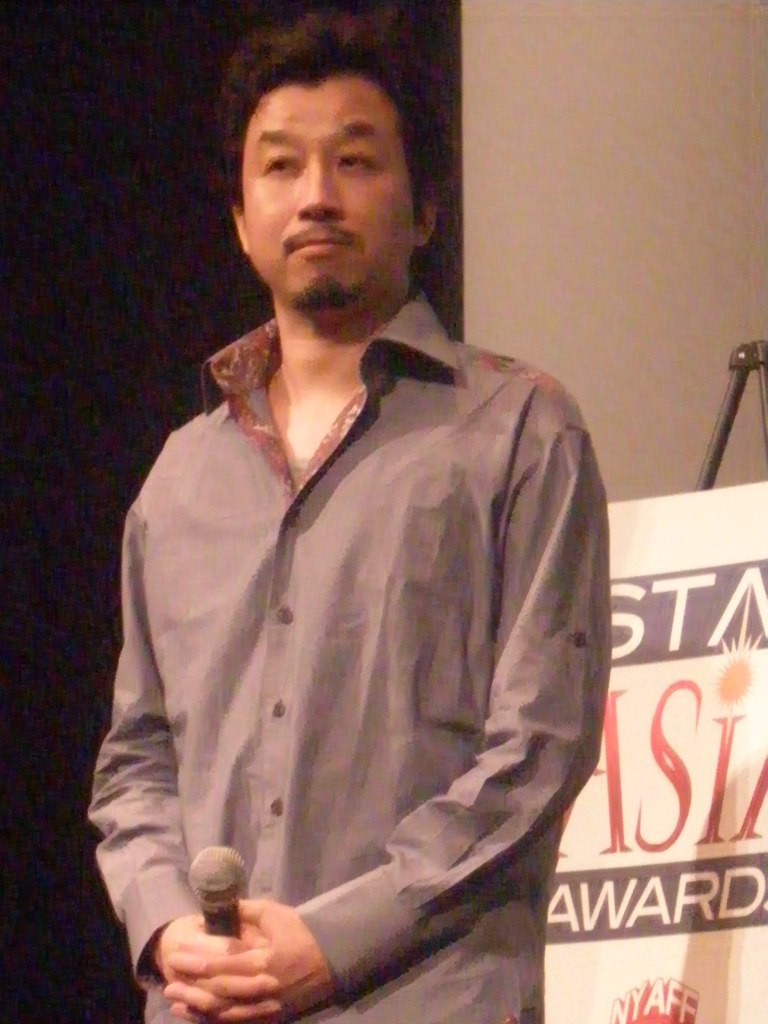
Yoshimasa Ishibashi (pictured in 2011) created and directed The Fuccons.

Yoshimasa Ishibashi was inspired to create The Fuccons after seeing an advertisement where guests at a party had frozen facial expressions, recalling that they were "so fake they made [him] laugh." Ishibashi opted to use mannequins because he did not want audiences to dismiss the series as a "TV parody" and because the series' content would feel "too grotesque" if real actors were used. In addition, he did not want the actors' personalities to influence how the characters were portrayed and wanted the characters to be "completely depersonalized."

Recreating a retro family setting similar to Bewitched, Ishibashi sourced the mannequins from a friend's warehouse, which originated from Yoshichu Mannequin. He picked fair-skinned, blue-eyed mannequins because the Japanese-looking mannequins had facial expressions that seemed too serious. Before filming, the mannequins would be styled by Ishibashi's make-up and hairstylist teams while he chose the outfits himself. He claimed that working with mannequins was "weird at first" but later decided that they were "not all that different from live actors."

Ishibashi chose the name "Fuccons" because he thought it sounded funny and said that the name did not mean anything in Japanese. He also denied claims of The Fuccons being a Japanese commentary on Americans and their stereotypes, insisting that the show was meant to be "art." Keishiro Tamura, a colleague of Ishibashi's from Kyoto Computer Gakuin, assisted him in filming the series. The series was filmed in full screen format, and it was shot in various locations in Kyoto, Japan. The story's script consists of repetitive lines, which Ishibashi intended to show that they were manufactured conversations instead of real ones.

=== Release and distribution ===
The series first appeared as a recurring segment titled The Fuccon Family (フーコン・ファミリー) in the 2000 sketch comedy show Vermilion Pleasure Night, which aired on TV Tokyo and was also produced by Ishibashi. After the first part ended, it was then followed up by The Fuccon Family Part 2 (フーコン・ファミリー パート２) and New Fuccon Family (新フーコン・ファミリー). A film titled The Color of Life compiling skits from Vermilion Pleasure Night was released in 2001, which also contained alternate cuts and endings to The Fuccon Family. In the same year, The Fuccon Family premiered in the United States at the New Directors/New Films Festival, where news was rapidly spread on the Internet through word-of-mouth, with viewers discussing the "manga-like freeze frames" and the morbid storylines. The Fuccon Family won the Ground-Breaker Award at the 6th Fantasia International Film Festival, Honorable Mention at the 3rd Kyoto Film Festival, and the Jury Special Prize at the Cinema Tout Ecran 7th Geneva International Film Festival. It won Best Series at the International D Cinema Festival in Paris, France. It was also screened at the 54th Locarno International Film Festival. A DVD compiling The Fuccon Family was later released on January 24, 2004, under the title The Fuccon Family: Special Edition.

Beginning January 6, 2002, the series received its own late-night time slot on TV Tokyo under the title Oh! Mikey. The series was broadcast for eight seasons from 2002 to 2005. 21 of the episodes were screened in Ebisu, Tokyo in 2002 and were later released on VHS under the title Oh! Mikey: Special Edition 2002. The home releases were initially distributed under Avex Trax, before moving to their own label, "The Fuccon Family." Afterward, several direct-to-DVDs were released containing sketches that were not broadcast on television, beginning with Oh! Mikey Hard Core on August 26, 2005. Oh! Mikey Extra was then released on August 25, 2006. Oh! Mikey Romance was released on December 3, 2010, to celebrate the series' 10th anniversary. All home releases were given Region 2 DVDs with an English language subtitle option.

On August 13 and August 21, 2010, Cartoon Network Japan broadcast an hour-long special on the series. In 2011, TV Tokyo began distributing all eight televised seasons through their online streaming service, AniTele Theater (currently known as Animeteleto), as well as Nicovideo, for domestic Japanese residents only.

=== English version ===
In 2004, three episodes were dubbed in English and screened at the 54th Berlin International Film Festival under the titles The Fuccons and The Fuccons: Special Edition. It was also screened at the 28th Hong Kong International Film Festival, Melbourne International Film Festival 2004, the 8th Bucheon International Fantastic Film Festival, the 24th Hawaii International Film Festival, 33rd Festival du nouveau cinéma.

In the same year, in addition to licensing Vermilion Pleasure Night, ADV Films also licensed the first four seasons for North American distribution with a new English dub produced, releasing the series under the title The Fuccons. The English dub was broadcast on Anime Network, as well as a recurring segment on G4's Late Night Peepshow on G4. ADV Films released the first 8 episodes as The Fuccons Vol. 0: Meet the Fuccons on December 20, 2005, as a preview of the series. 17 episodes were later released as The Fuccons Vol. 1: OH! Mikey on February 28, 2006. 18 episodes were released as The Fuccons Vol. 2: It's a Fuccon World! on April 25, 2006. 17 episodes were released as The Fuccons Vol. 3: Fuccon! Fuccon! Fuccon! on July 11, 2006. A compilation of vols. 1-3 was released as The Fuccons: The Whole Fuccon Show! on December 9, 2008. After the closure of ADV Films, The Fuccons is being distributed by Sentai Filmworks through the online streaming service Hidive.

== Episodes ==
Series overview
Season	Episodes	Originally released	
Season	Episodes	First released	Last released
1st	13	January 6, 2002	March 31, 2002
2nd	13	April 2, 2002	June 25, 2002
3rd	13	July 2, 2002	September 24, 2002
4th	13	October 1, 2002	December 24, 2002
5th	13	July 5, 2003	September 27, 2003
6th	13	April 3, 2004	June 26, 2004
7th	13	January 13, 2005	April 6, 2005
8th	12	April 11, 2005	July 11, 2005
Hard Core	8	August 26, 2005	
Extra	13	August 25, 2006	
Fever	10	December 1, 2007	
Romance	10	December 3, 2010	

== Films ==
Wah! Mikey Returns! was released in 2003. Another limited screening took place in various theaters in Tokyo, Osaka, Kanagawa, and Nagoya in July 2004. Oh! Mikey Fever, a film containing new original sketches, held limited theater screenings in Tokyo and Osaka on December 1, 2007.

== Legacy ==
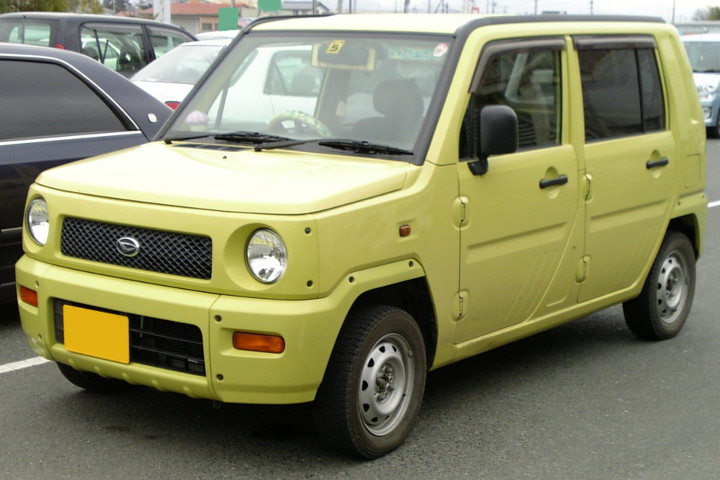
The yellow Daihatsu Naked is used as the Fuccons' family car. The characters were also used as promotional models for Daihatsu.

The Fuccons gained a cult following throughout its broadcast. By 2010, The Fuccons gained 60,000 followers on their Mixi page. A New Years' television special titled Oh! Mikey New Years Special was broadcast beginning December 20, 2007, and was hosted by the comedy duo Fujisaki Market. The popularity of The Fuccons inspired themed restaurants. In December 2010, Nescafé held a collaboration cafe with The Fuccons called "Mikey's Cafe" to celebrate the franchise's 10th anniversary, with comedian Shingo Tano making a one-day appearance.

An art exhibit titled Mikey's Attack! took place at Kirin Plaza Osaka from December 11, 2004, to January 30, 2005. Footage from the event was later released as an episode on Oh! Mikey Extra on August 25, 2006. Another art exhibit titled Oh! Mikey Romance: 10 Years of Oh! Mikey was displayed at the Kyoto International Manga Museum from December 2010 to February 2011 to celebrate the series' 10th anniversary. Oh! Mikey: Special Edition 2002 was screened at Parasophia: Kyoto International Festival of Contemporary Culture 2015 at the Museum of Kyoto as part of Ishibashi's general art exhibit.

The Fuccons have also appeared in commercials for Vodafone, LG Telecom, Furniture Dome, Ettusais, NTT Docomo, Sapporo Beer, and Mouse Computer. Model Matt Kuwata starred in the collaboration episodes with Mouse Computer as Mikey's older brother, with eight episodes released online. The characters were also used as promotional models for Parco and Daihatsu. A pictorial photoshoot featuring the characters was shot for Vogue Hommes International.

== Reception ==
=== Critical response ===
In North America, The Fuccons received a mixed reception. Many critics compared the visual styling of The Fuccons to 1950s sitcoms such as Leave It to Beaver and It's a Wonderful Life. Other comparisons were drawn to The Simpsons for originating from a sketch comedy series and later receiving its own show. The Fuccons were also compared to "Summer Holidays", a series of photos of mannequins created by photographer Bernard Faucon in 1978. Several critics explored the possibility of The Fuccons as being a Japanese commentary on Americans and their stereotypes in Japan, though the majority expressed otherwise. In spite of the speculation, Ishibashi himself has stated that The Fuccons was not intended to be a cross-cultural commentary and that it was meant to be "art."

Jake L. Godek from THEM Anime Reviews gave the series a 1-star rating, claiming that the episodes have no "continuous ideas." Similarly, Chris Tibbey from DVD Talk did not find the series funny but praised ADV Films for taking a risk and licensing live-action series. At the same time, Don Houston from DVD Talk described the series as a "wacky, weird ride" but warned that "not everyone thinks this is funny or creative." Bamboo Dong from Anime News Network called the humor "quirky", but also noted that viewers who were not ready to overlook the mannequin concept were less likely to enjoy the series. Writing for Amazon's editorial, Charles Solomon described the vocal performance as "over-the-top", claiming that while the show may bring up discussions about Japanese attitudes towards Americans and the series' "we're-so-dumb-we're-hip charms", he considered it a "pointless waste of time."

On the other hand, Kaori Shoji from The New York Times' International Herald Tribune credited Ishibashi's art style to his Kyoto upbringing, and described The Fuccon Family segments as "darkly funny" with an "over-the-top caricatured view." Gail Nakada from Wired describes the series as "perverse and riotous", with "adultery, childhood antics, and a mother's perfectionism." The Austin Chronicle describes The Fuccons as having "witty" dialogue that was "filled with non-sequiturs and static humor", praising the series for parodying the sitcom genre with its "absurdity." Zack Parsons from Something Awful gave the first season a score of 41/50, citing its strengths to be its characters and surreal humor. In his review of the second season, Parsons gave the same score, praising the first half of the season while stating the second half of the season was where the series went to "uncharted territories." Jamie S. Rich from DVD Talk stated that the humor of the series is better accepted through its absurdity and not through its depiction of stereotypes, expressing that, while the introductory episodes fell flat, the increasingly outlandish situations the Fuccons are placed in draw hilarity. Film Threat expressed that in spite of The Fuccons having an "unusual format and hallucinatory subject matter", it provides as many "good laughs" as confusing moments.

=== Awards and accolades ===
Year	Award	Category	Nominated work	Result	Ref.
2001	Fantasia International Film Festival	Ground-Breaker Award	The Fuccon Family	Won	
2001	International D Cinema Festival	Best Series	The Fuccon Family	Won	
