= Vermilion Pleasure Night =

- Opening screen
- Created by: Yoshimasa Ishibashi
- Directed by: Yoshimasa Ishibashi
- Creative director: Hiroaki Katayama
- Starring: Ahn Mika; Hanako Katagiri; Rio; Makiko Shinohara; Aya Kawahara; Kayoko Fujita; Yuko Ikoma
- Theme music composer: mama!milk
- Opening theme: "Kyoro no Kyoen (A Spree & Frenchjinks)"
- Country of origin: Japan
- Original languages: Japanese, English
- No. of episodes: 25

Production
- Executive producer: Takeshi Yokozawa
- Producer: Masataka Izumi
- Editor: Yoshimasa Ishibashi
- Running time: 25 minutes

Original release
- Network: TV Tokyo
- Release: 2 July – 24 December 2000

Related
- The Fuccons

Vermilion Pleasure Night (バミリオン・プレジャー・ナイト, Bamirion Purejā Naito), or VPN, is a Japanese late-night variety and comedy skit TV show created by Yoshimasa Ishibashi. The program mixed animated and live-action segments (often parodying TV series) in a fashion similar to SCTV. The show premiered on July 2, 2000 on TV Tokyo and aired 25 episodes. The series is best known for its recurring segment, The Fuccons, which spun off its own series, Oh! Mikey. In America, the series aired on Anime Network.

== Recurring skits ==
- The Fuccon Family (フーコン・ファミリー, Fūkon Famirī) revolves around the adventures of an American family (portrayed by mannequins), and was eventually spun off into its own show called Oh! Mikey (broadcast and released to DVD in North America as The Fuccons). Ishibashi claimed that the idea came from an advertisement where guests at a party were frozen in bright-faced expressions. He also based the suburban setting on episodes of Bewitched.
- "Cathy's House" features four women in clothing, sets, and situations evocative of Barbie dolls.
- "Resident Starship" is about an apartment complex style starship, complete with crazy residents.
- "Midnight Cooking" parodies cooking shows, set apart by random singing and self-inflicted torture.
- "One Point English Lesson," a parody of language learning shows, features an oiran teaching risqué pick-up lines in English.
- "Juvenile Delinquent Takako," excerpts from the life of Takako, a rebellious schoolgirl living in a world of mannequins, similar to the Fuccon Family except that Takako is the only live human.
- Each episode also included at least one musical performance by a core group of female singers and musicians.

== DVD release ==
Five compilation DVDs of skits from Vermilion Pleasure Night were released in Japan. In addition, a feature-length compilation film titled "THE COLOR OF LIFE" was released in theaters and recycled much of the same content and also contained some bonus material as an incentive for collectors.

The US releases (published by ADV Films) paired up these DVDs into three volumes:

- Vermilion Pleasure Night Vol. 1: OpticErotica ("GOLD" + Japan volume 2)
- Vermilion Pleasure Night Vol. 2: VoxStimuli (Japan volumes 3 & 4)
- Vermilion Pleasure Night Vol. 3: Créme de la Créme (Japan volume 5 + "THE COLOR OF LIFE")

Each ADV DVD also contains an optional English dub. In the beginning of 2009, a Complete Collection was released.

A DVD of the Fuccon Family sketches was released on January 24, 2004, including the sketches that were not included in the other volumes.

== CD soundtrack release ==
"RISE - Vermilion Pleasure Night", the official soundtrack CD containing full versions of another of the show's theme songs as well as audio versions of some of the recurring skits, was released on April 18, 2001 on the Zetima label. The limited-edition first pressing came accompanied with a photobook.
