= Yoshimasa Ishibashi =

Japanese film director (born 1968)

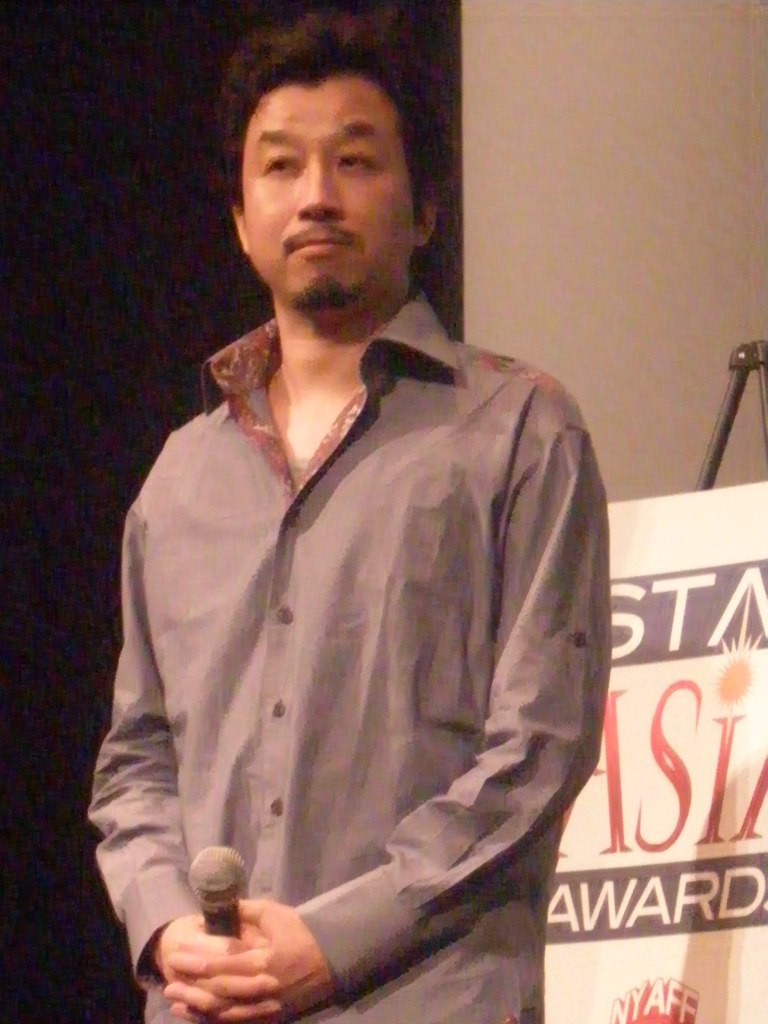
- Ishibashi at the 2011 New York Asian Film Festival
- Born: Yoshimasa Ishibashi; 1968 (age 57–58); Kyoto, Japan

Yoshimasa Ishibashi (石橋義正, Ishibashi Yoshimasa; born 1968) is a Japanese video, experimental film and performance artist based in Kyoto, Japan and the leader of the Kyupi Kyupi artist collective, founded in 1996. He has directed work for both art museums, including Kyupi Kyupi performances at the Palais de Tokyo and Tate Modern in 2003, and commercial television and film, his most famous creation being the Fuccons, a family of mannequins who first appeared in Vermilion Pleasure Night in 2000 and since in their own program Oh! Mikey and its spin-offs.

== Filmography ==
Year	Title	Medium and role	Notes
1998	I Wanna Drive You Insane (狂わせたいの, Kuruwasetaino)	Part color, 16 mm, stereo, 60 min Direction, screenplay, executive production, cinematography, editing, art, performance	Released in Japanese cinemas October 10, 1998
2000	Vermilion Pleasure Night (バミリオン・プレジャー・ナイト, Bamirion Purejā Naito)	25 × 25 min Direction, screenplay, executive production, cinematography, editing, music	Aired on Japanese TV July 2 – December 24, 2000 "The Fuccon Family" segments also released on DVD separately in 2004
2002	Oh! Mikey (オー!マイキー, Ō! Maikī), aka The Fuccons	104 × 3 min Direction, screenplay, executive production, cinematography, editing	Aired on Japanese TV from January 6, 2002
2002	The Color of Life (カラー・オブ・ライフ, Karā obu Raifu)	Color, 35 mm, stereo, 88 min Direction, screenplay, executive production, cinematography, editing, music direction	Released in Japanese cinemas March 22, 2002; Vermilion Pleasure Night spin-off film
2005	Oh! Mikey Hard Core (オー!マイキー ハードコア, Ō! Maikī Hādo Koa)	8 × 3 min Direction, screenplay, executive production, cinematography, editing	Released on DVD in Japan August 26, 2005; More risqué unaired episodes
2006	Oh! Mikey Night (オー!マイキー ナイト, Ō! Maikī Naito)	60 min Direction, screenplay, executive production, cinematography, editing	Released in Japanese cinemas July 1, 2006; Compilation of Hard Core and new episodes
2006	Oh! Mikey Extra (オー!マイキー エクストラ, Ō! Maikī Ekusutora)	13 × 3 min Direction, screenplay, executive production, cinematography, editing	Released on DVD in Japan August 25, 2006; New Night and other non-TV episodes
2007	Oh! Mikey Fever (オー!マイキー フィーバー, Ō! Maikī Fībā)	40 min Direction, screenplay, executive production, cinematography, editing	Released in Japanese cinemas December 1, 2007
2010	Oh! Mikey Romance (オー!マイキー ロマンス, Ō! Maikī Romansu)	10 × 3 min Direction, screenplay, executive production, cinematography, editing	Aired on Japanese TV November 4 – December 30, 2010
2011	Milocrorze (ミロクローゼ, Mirokurōze), aka Milocrorze: A Love Story	Color, digital video, 90 min Direction, screenplay, executive production, editing, music	Premièred February 18, 2011; Released in Japanese cinemas spring 2012
2023	Six Singing Women	Direction	
