= List of gay, lesbian or bisexual people: P–Q =

This is a partial list of notable people who were or are gay men, lesbian or bisexual.

The historical concept and definition of sexual orientation varies and has changed greatly over time; for example the general term "gay" was not used to describe sexual orientation until the mid 20th century. A number of different classification schemes have been used to describe sexual orientation since the mid-19th century, and scholars have often defined the term "sexual orientation" in divergent ways. Indeed, several studies have found that much of the research about sexual orientation has failed to define the term at all, making it difficult to reconcile the results of different studies. However, most definitions include a psychological component (such as the direction of an individual's erotic desire) and/or a behavioural component (which focuses on the sex of the individual's sexual partner/s). Some prefer to simply follow an individual's self-definition or identity.

The high prevalence of people from the West on this list may be due to societal attitudes towards homosexuality. The Pew Research Center's 2013 Global Attitudes Survey found that there is “greater acceptance in more secular and affluent countries,” with "publics in 39 countries [having] broad acceptance of homosexuality in North America, the European Union, and much of Latin America, but equally widespread rejection in predominantly Muslim nations and in Africa, as well as in parts of Asia and in Russia. Opinion about the acceptability of homosexuality is divided in Israel, Poland and Bolivia.” As of 2013, Americans are divided – a majority (60 percent) believes homosexuality should be accepted, while 33 percent disagree.

== P ==
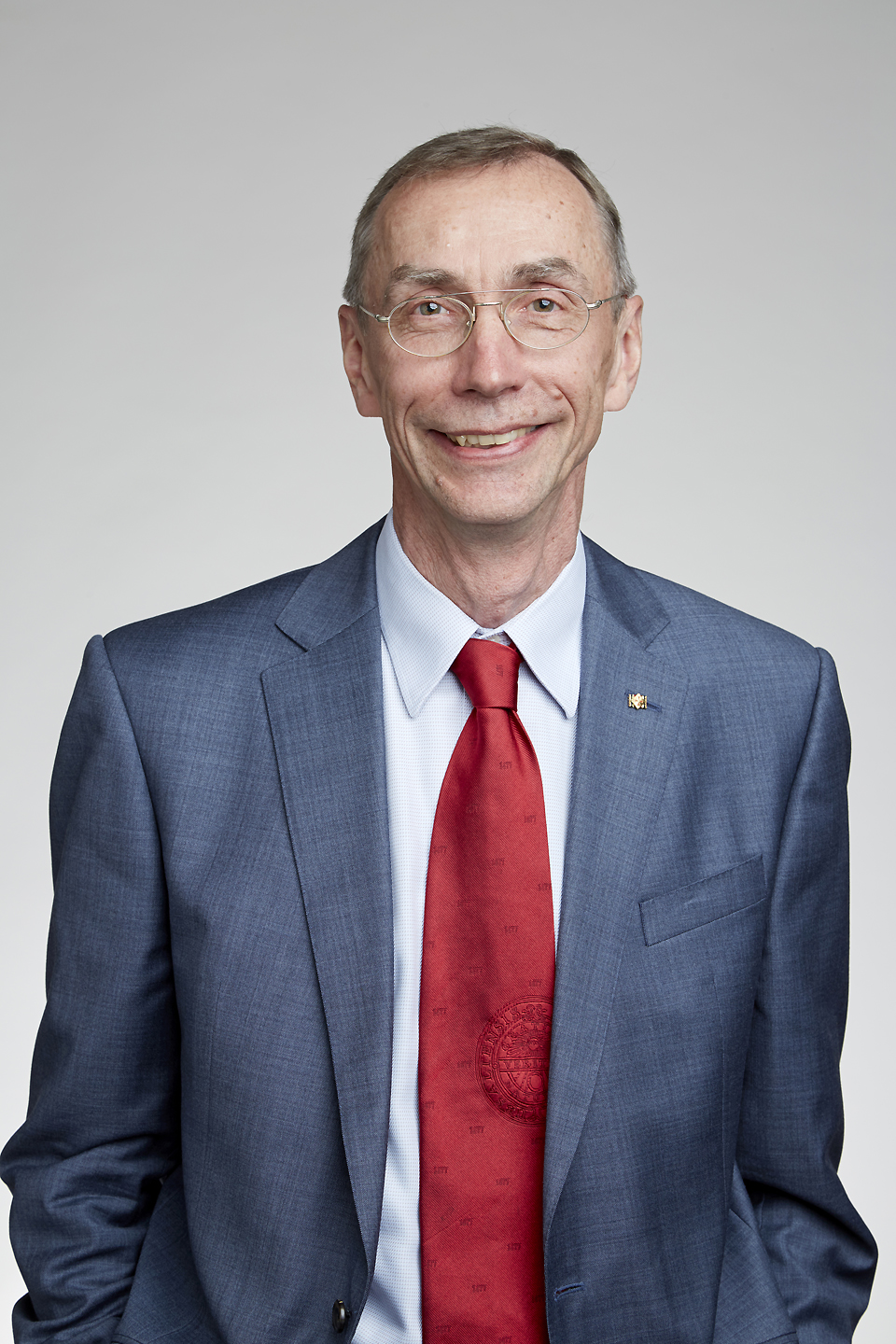
Biologist and paleogeneticist Svante Pääbo

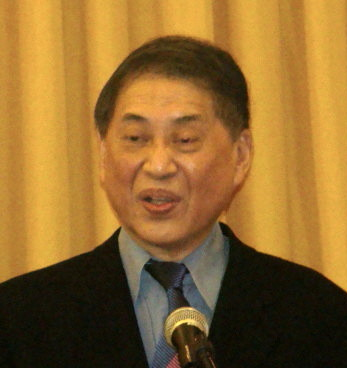
Writer Pai Hsien-yung

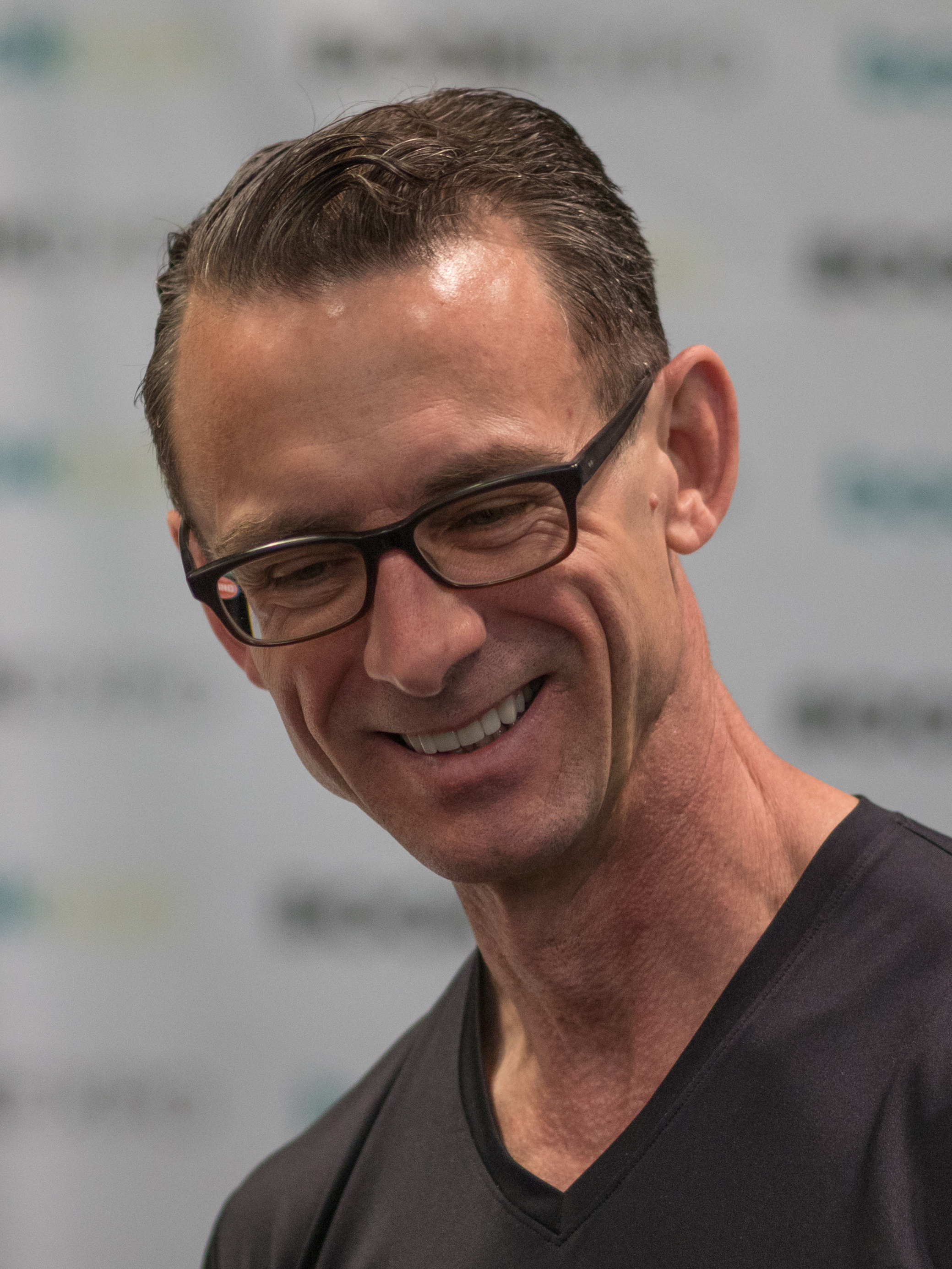
Author Chuck Palahniuk

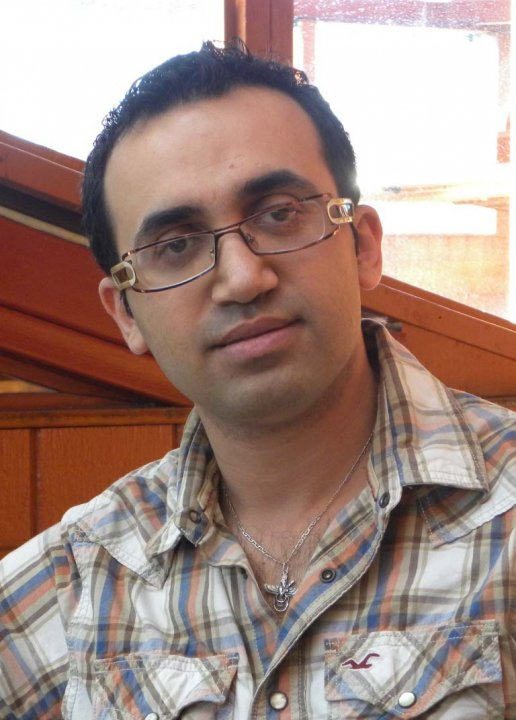
Activist Arsham Parsi

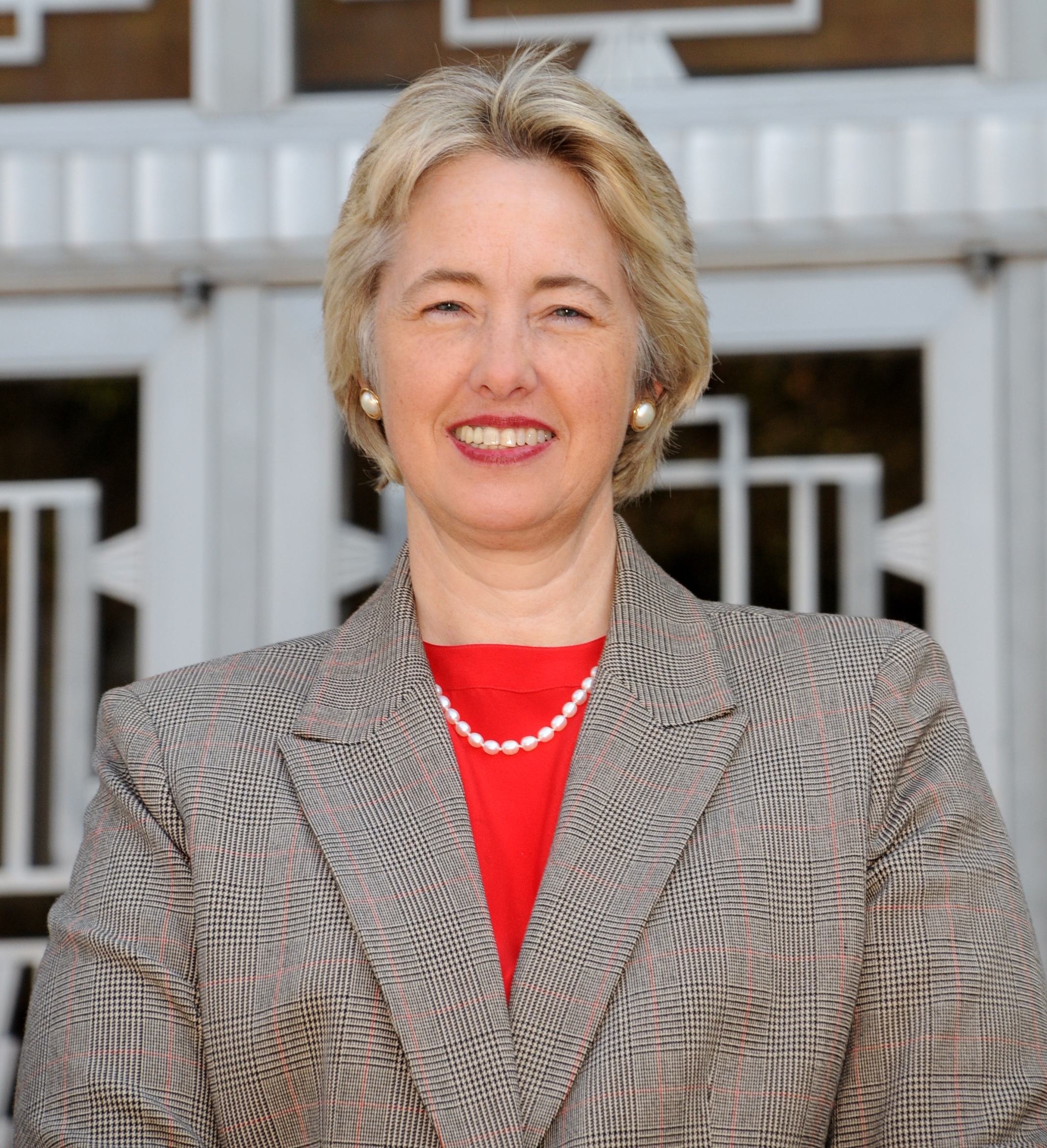
Politician Annise Parker

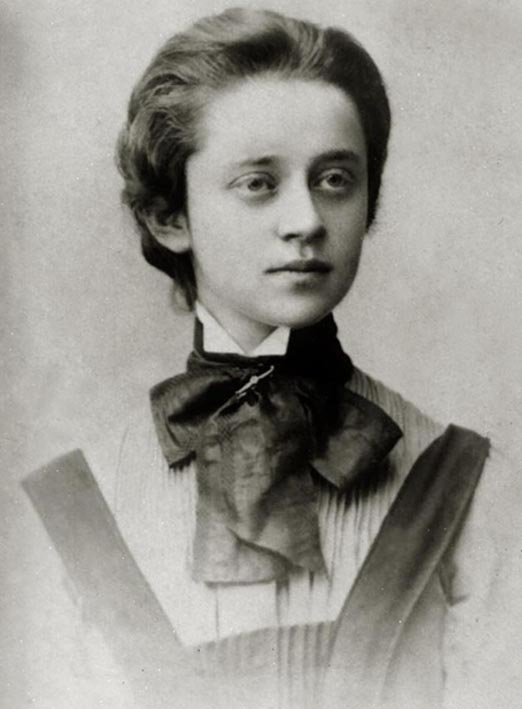
Poet and journalist Sophia Parnok

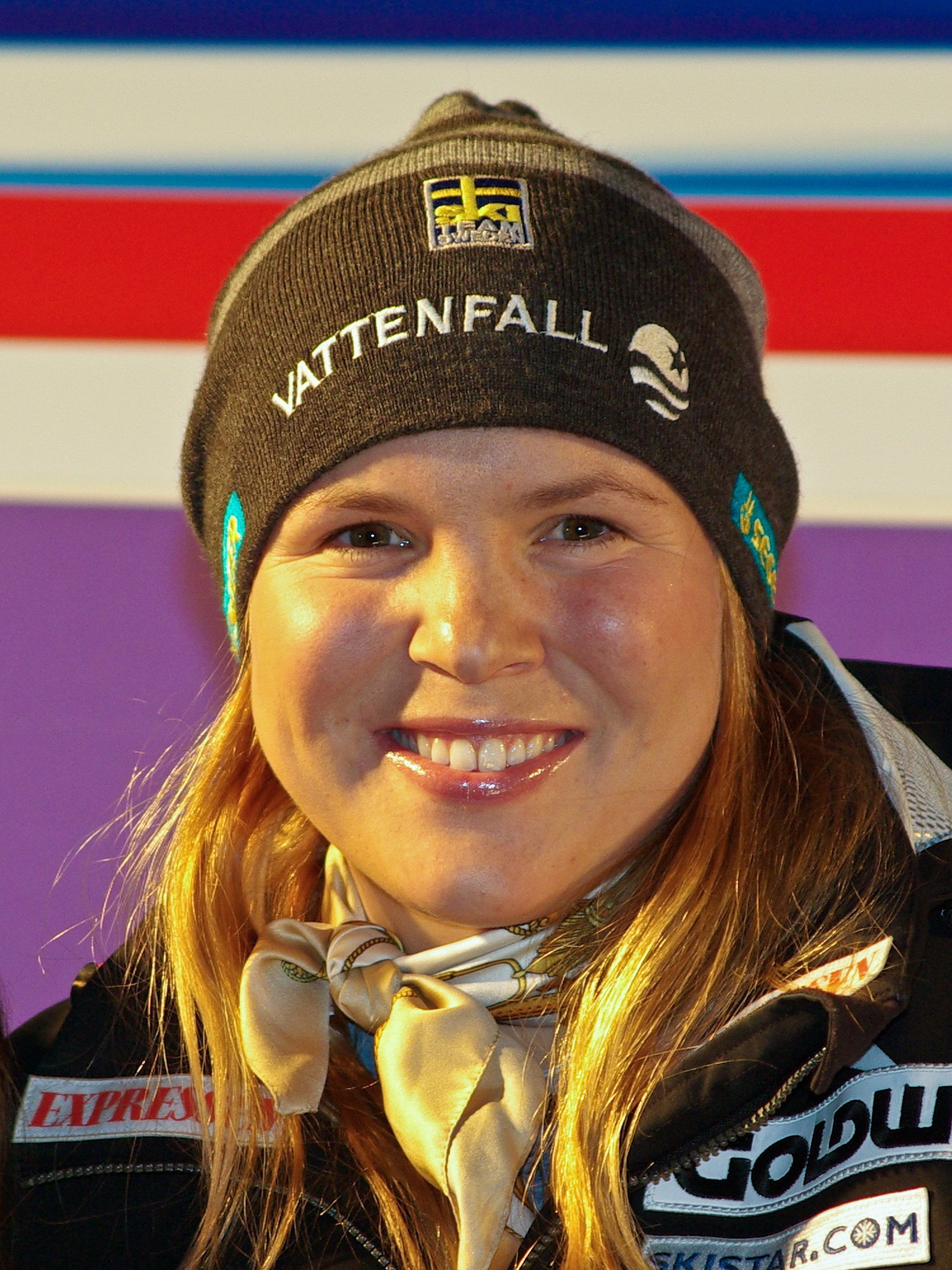
Alpine skier Anja Pärson

Singer, actor and comedian Jean-Claude Pascal

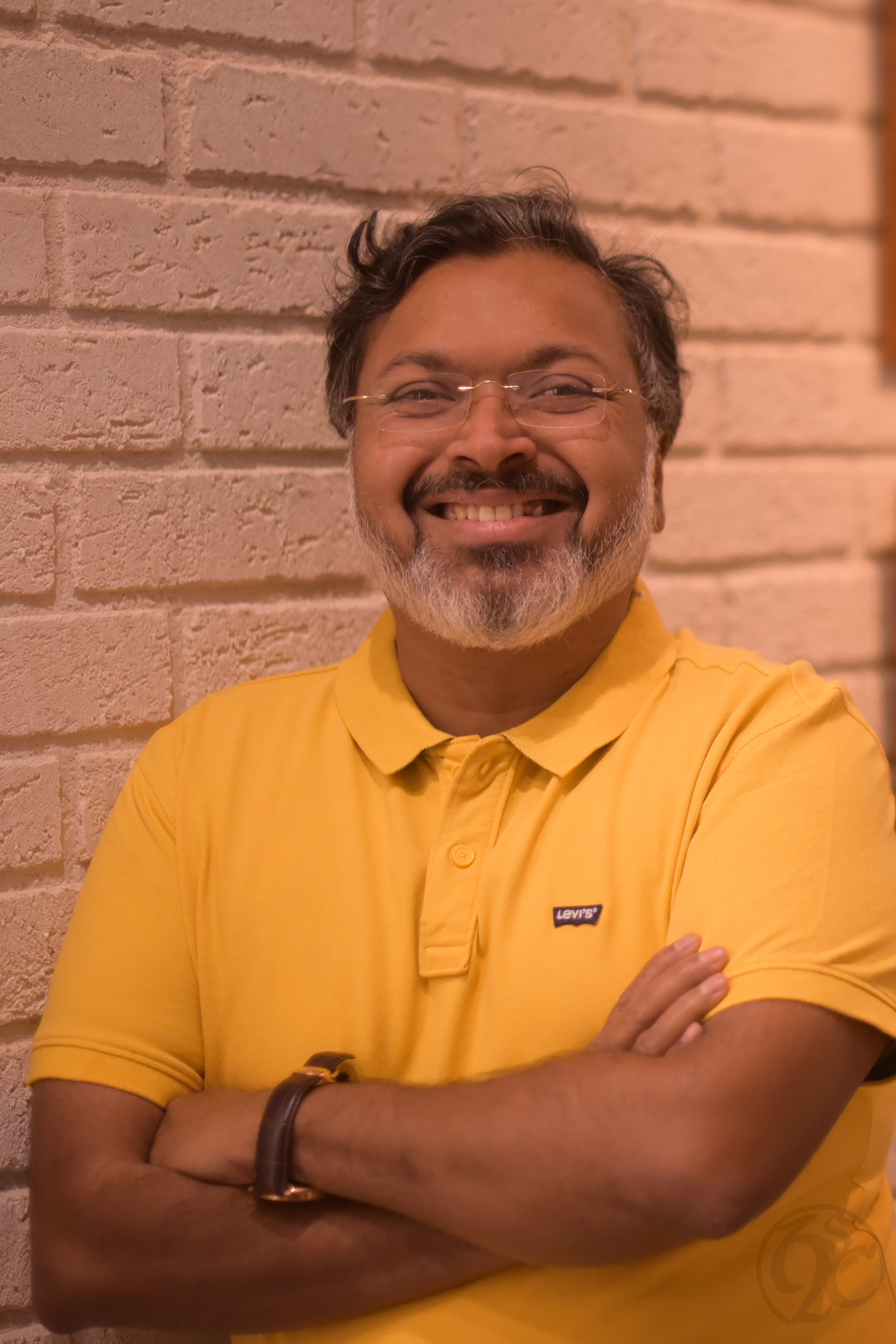
Mythographer, author and illustrator Devdutt Pattanaik

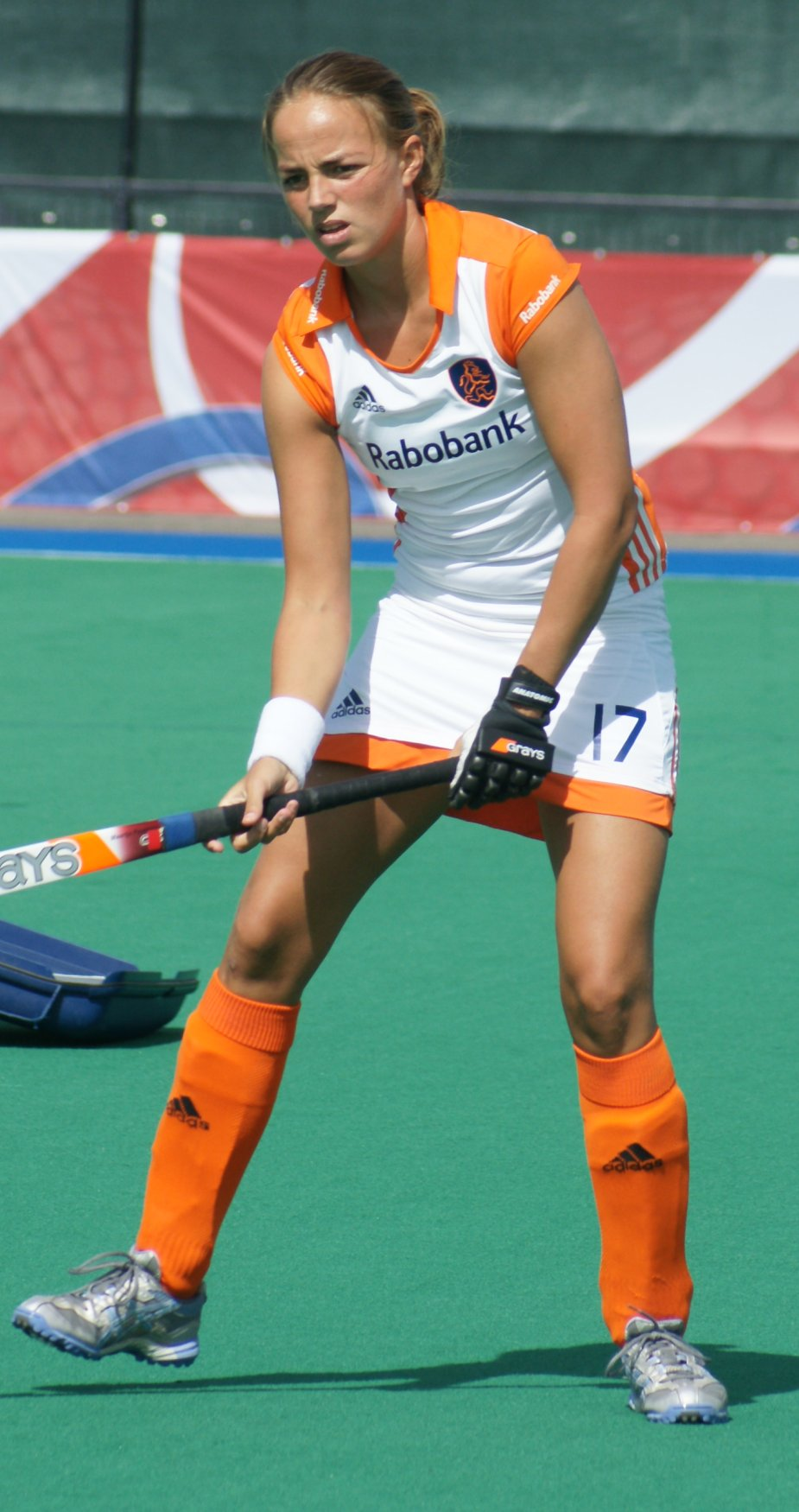
Field hockey player Maartje Paumen

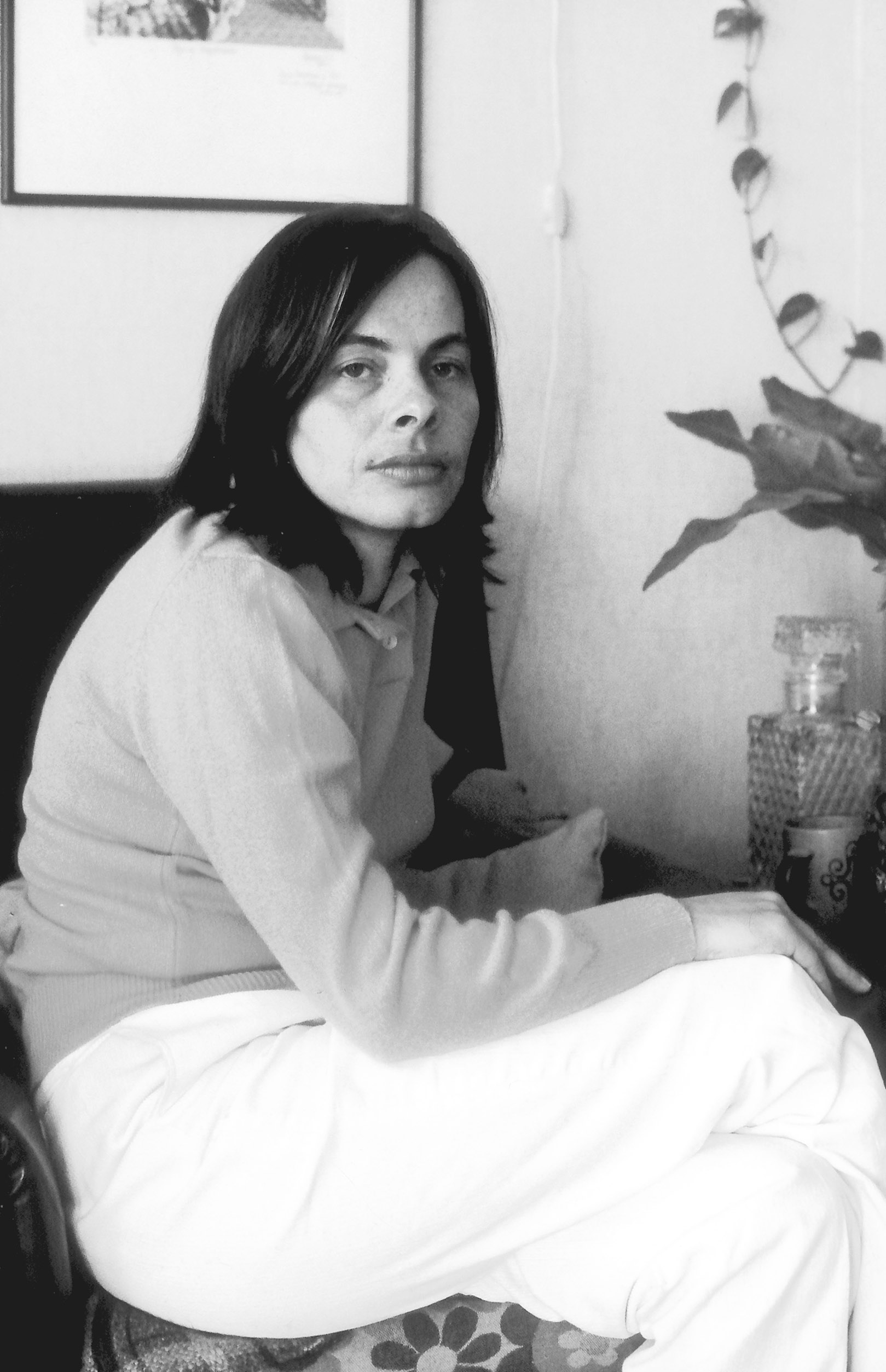
Author and translator Cristina Peri Rossi

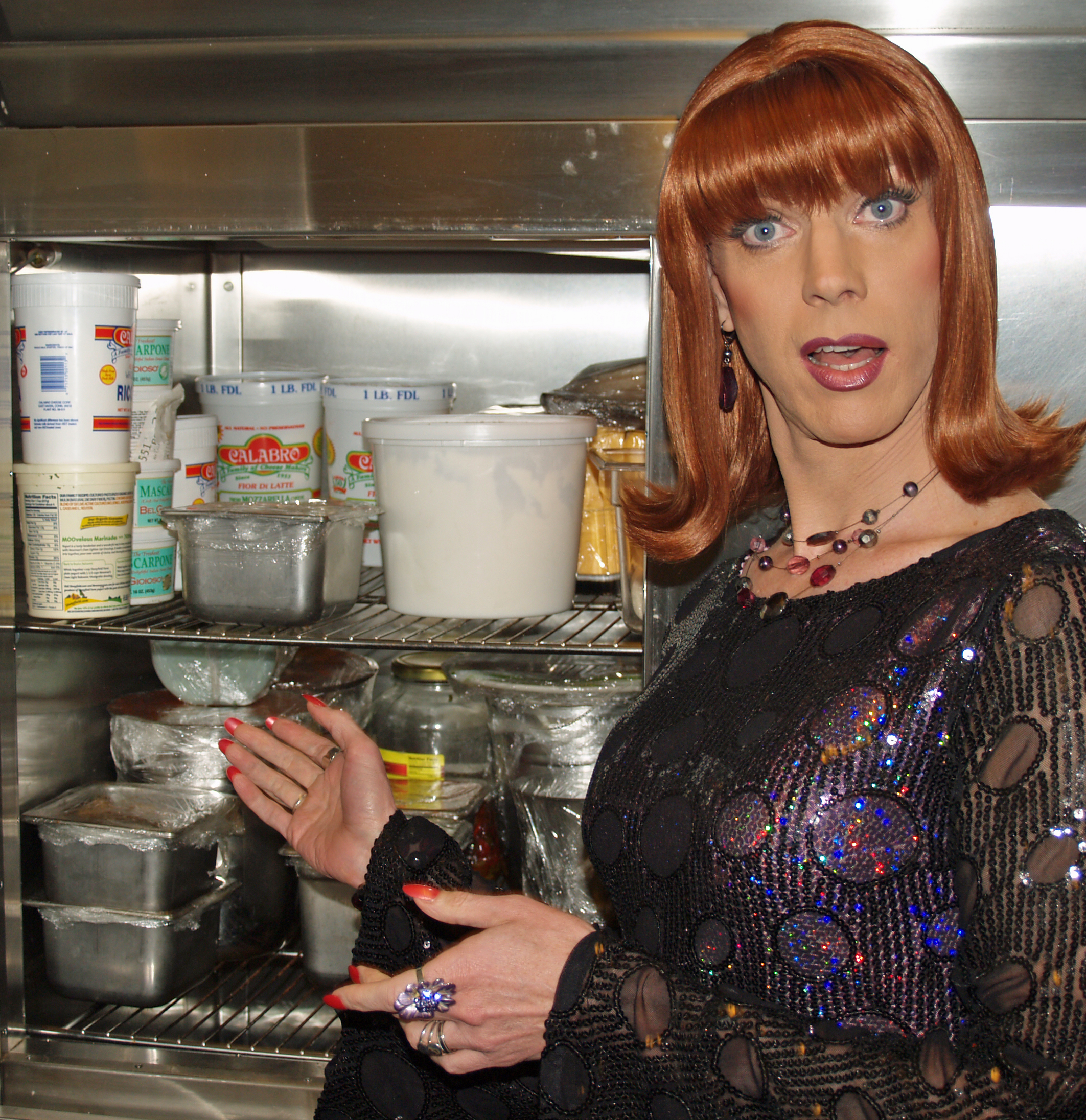
Comedian Miss Coco Peru

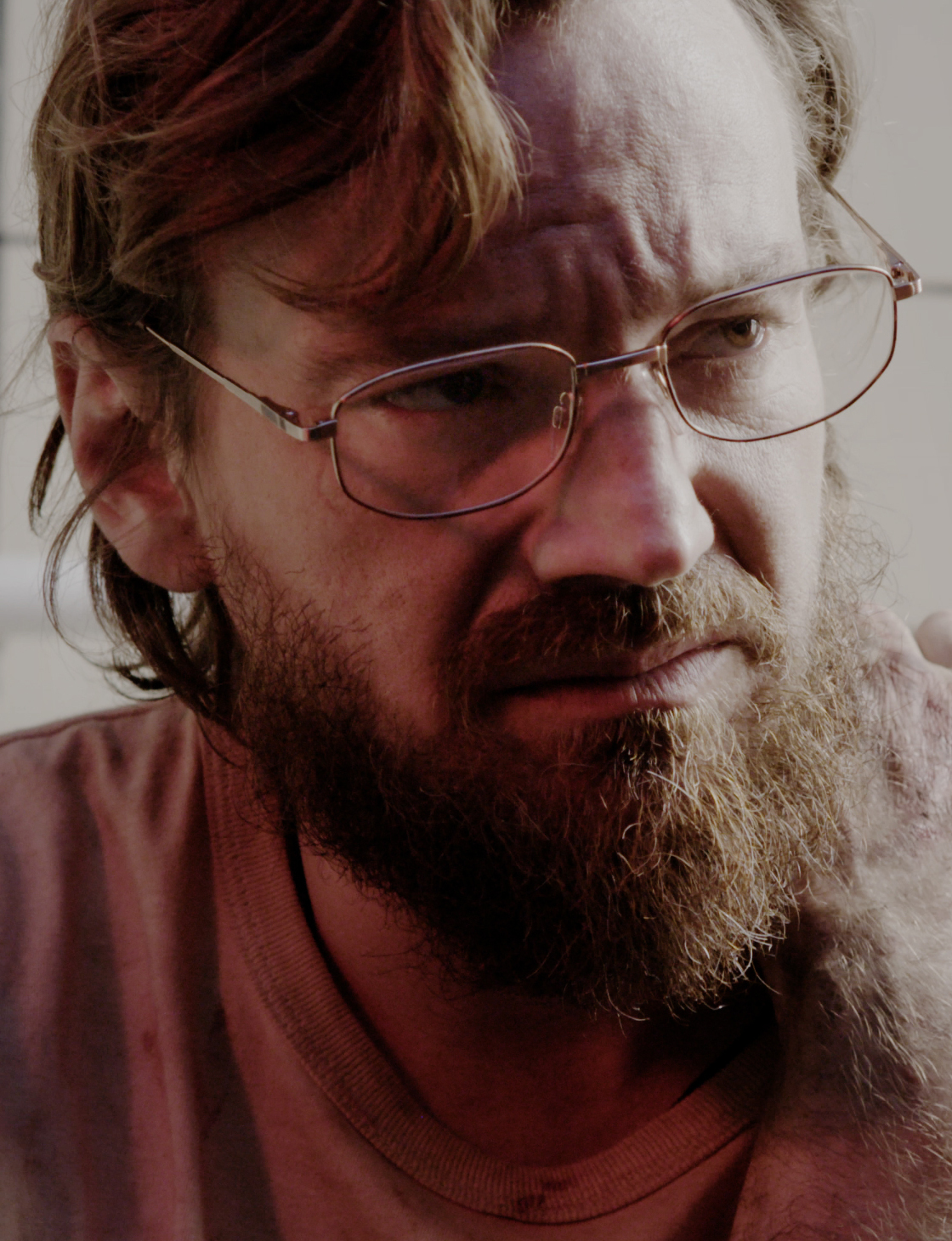
Actor and film producer Guillermo Pfening

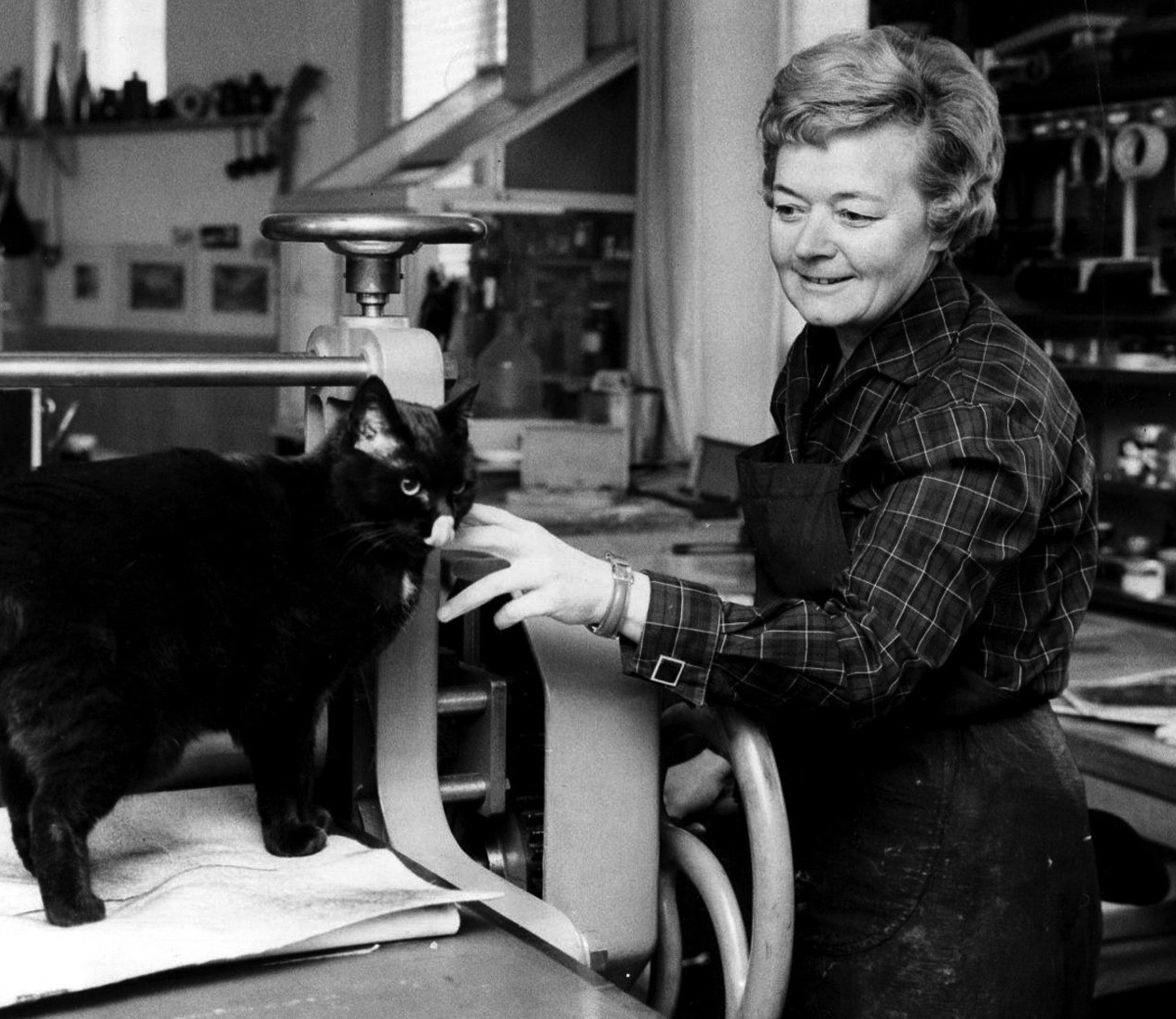
Graphic artist Tuulikki Pietilä

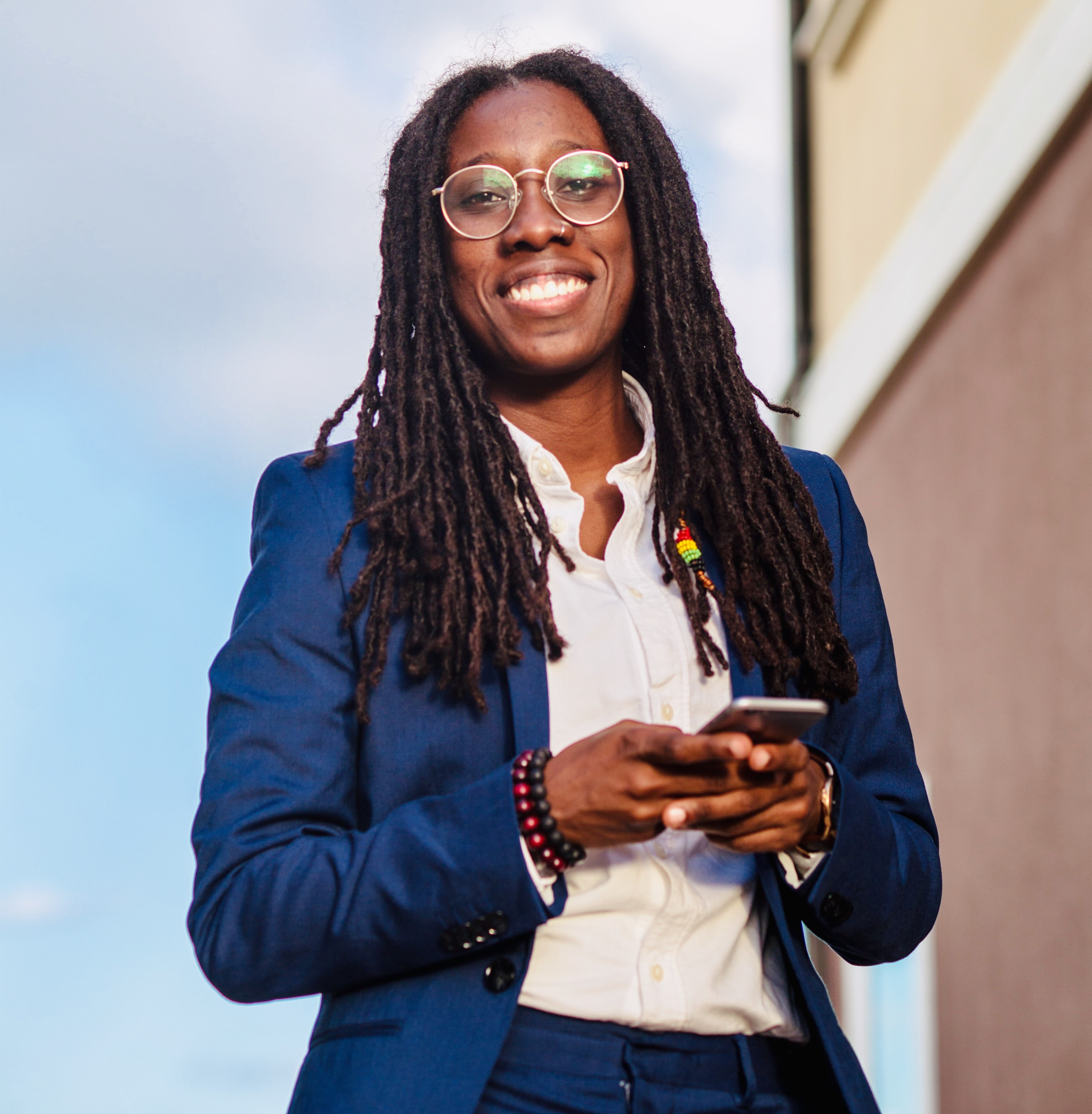
Tech entrepreneur, designer and human rights advocate Donnya Piggott

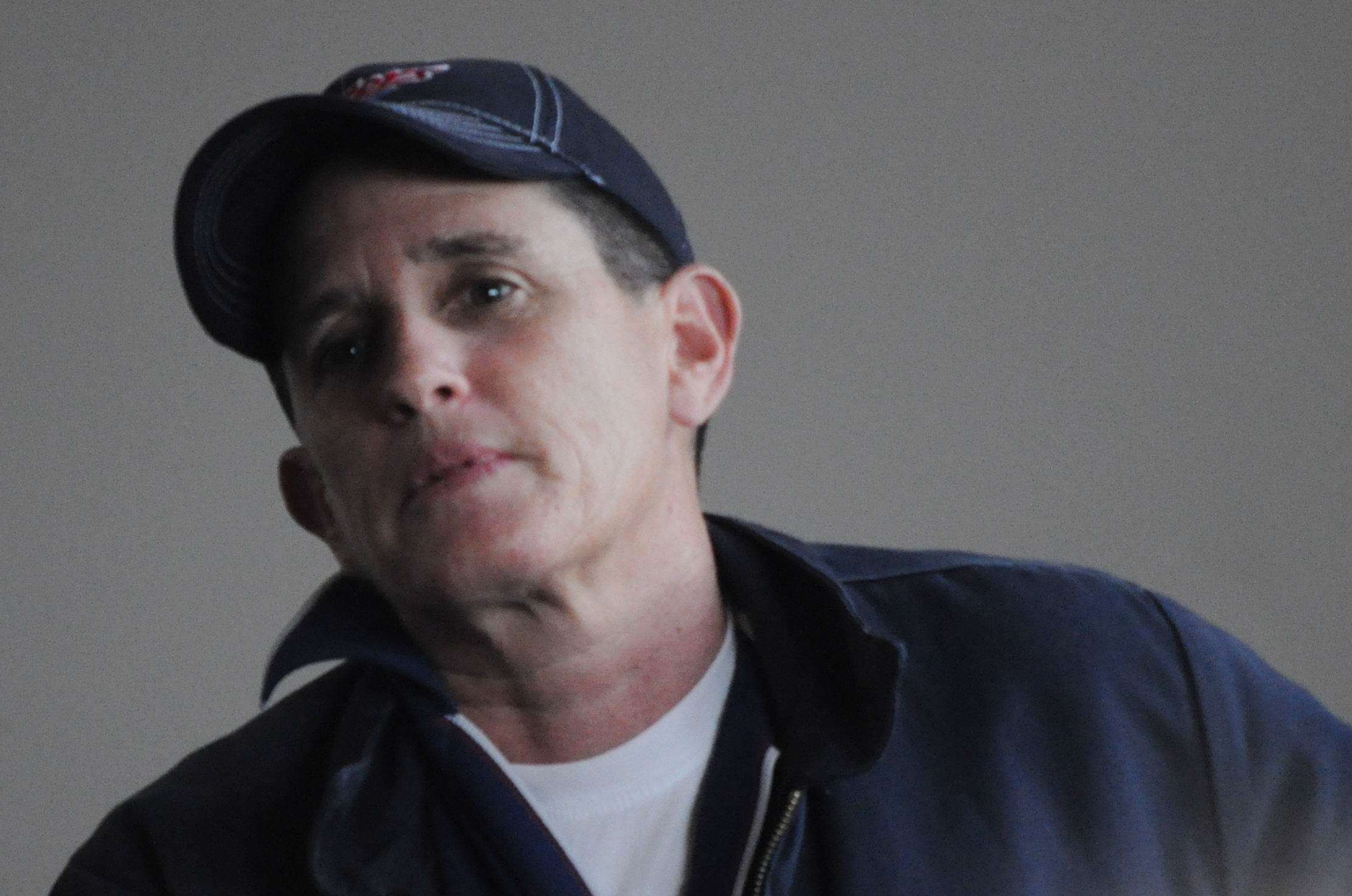
Singer-songwriter Phranc

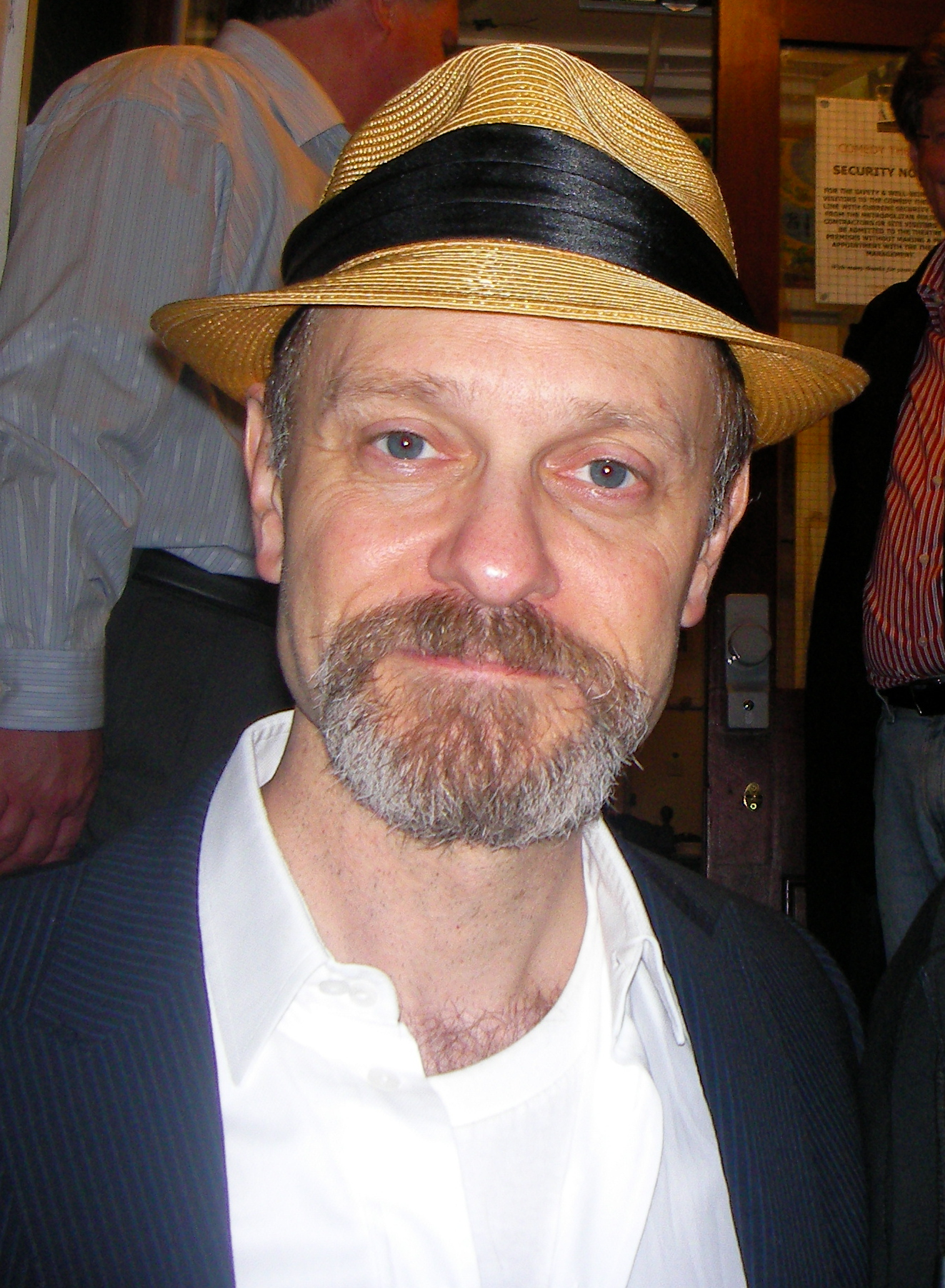
Actor David Hyde Pierce

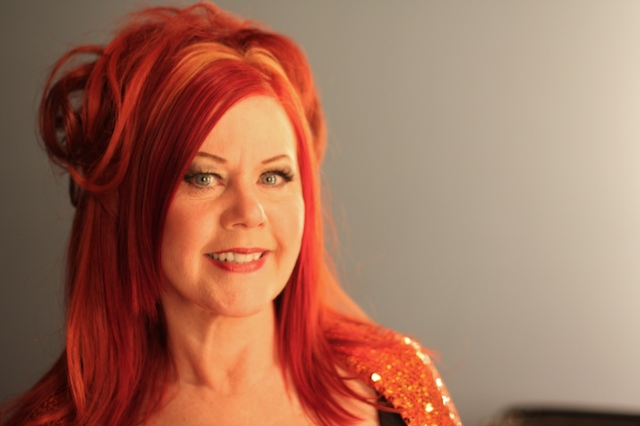
Rock musician Kate Pierson

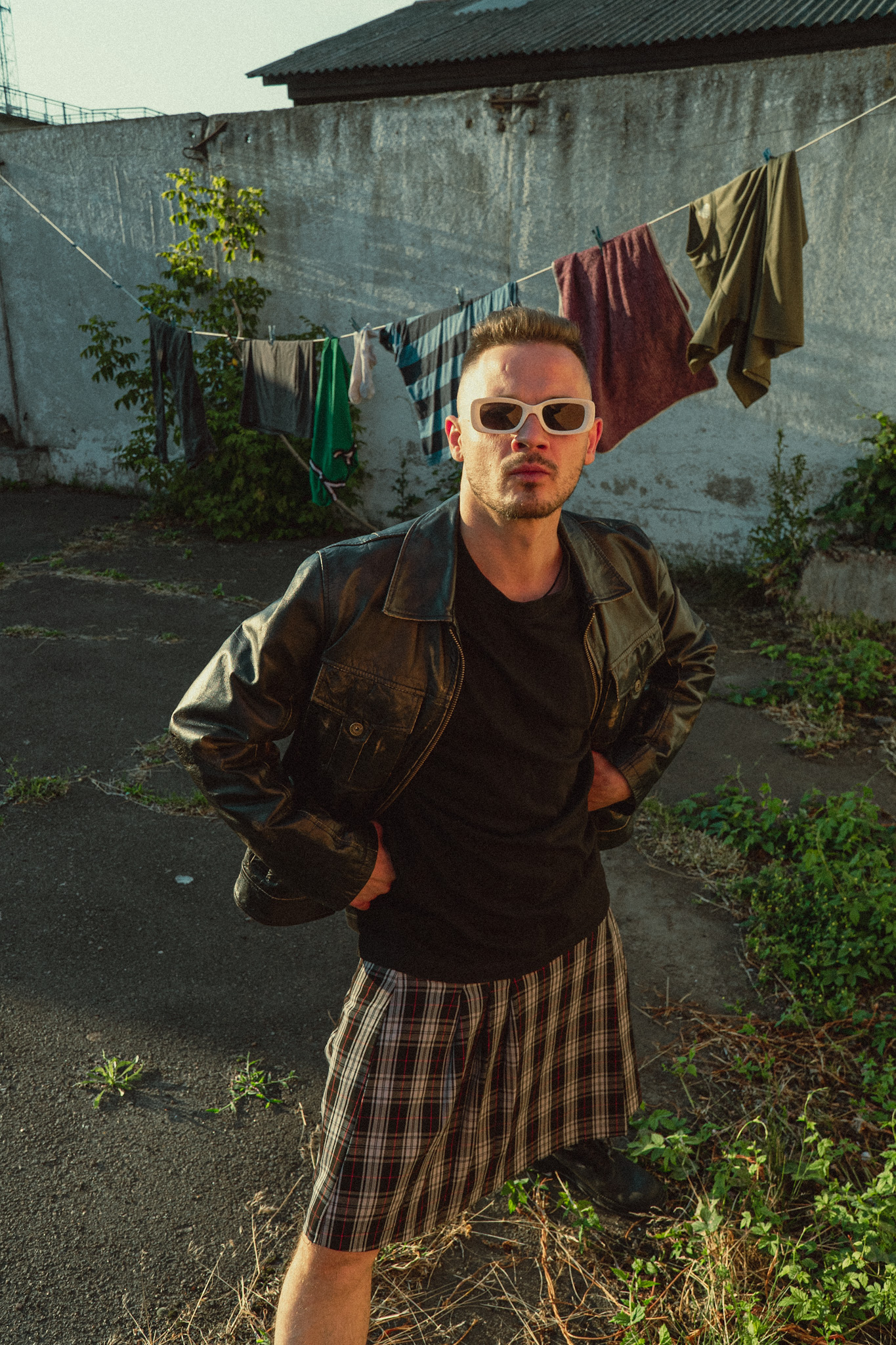
Actor Oleksandr Piskunov

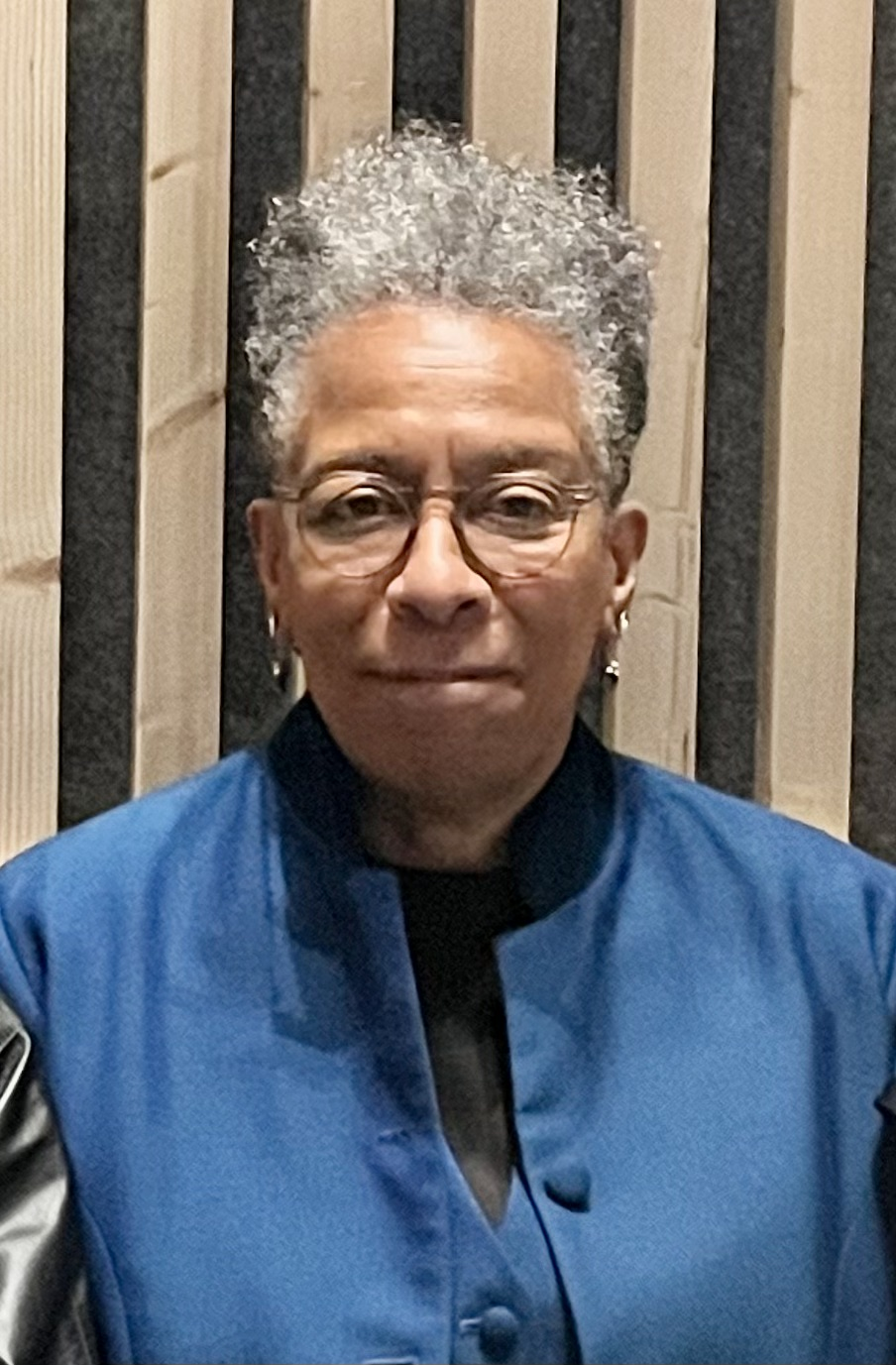
Artist and photographer Ingrid Pollard

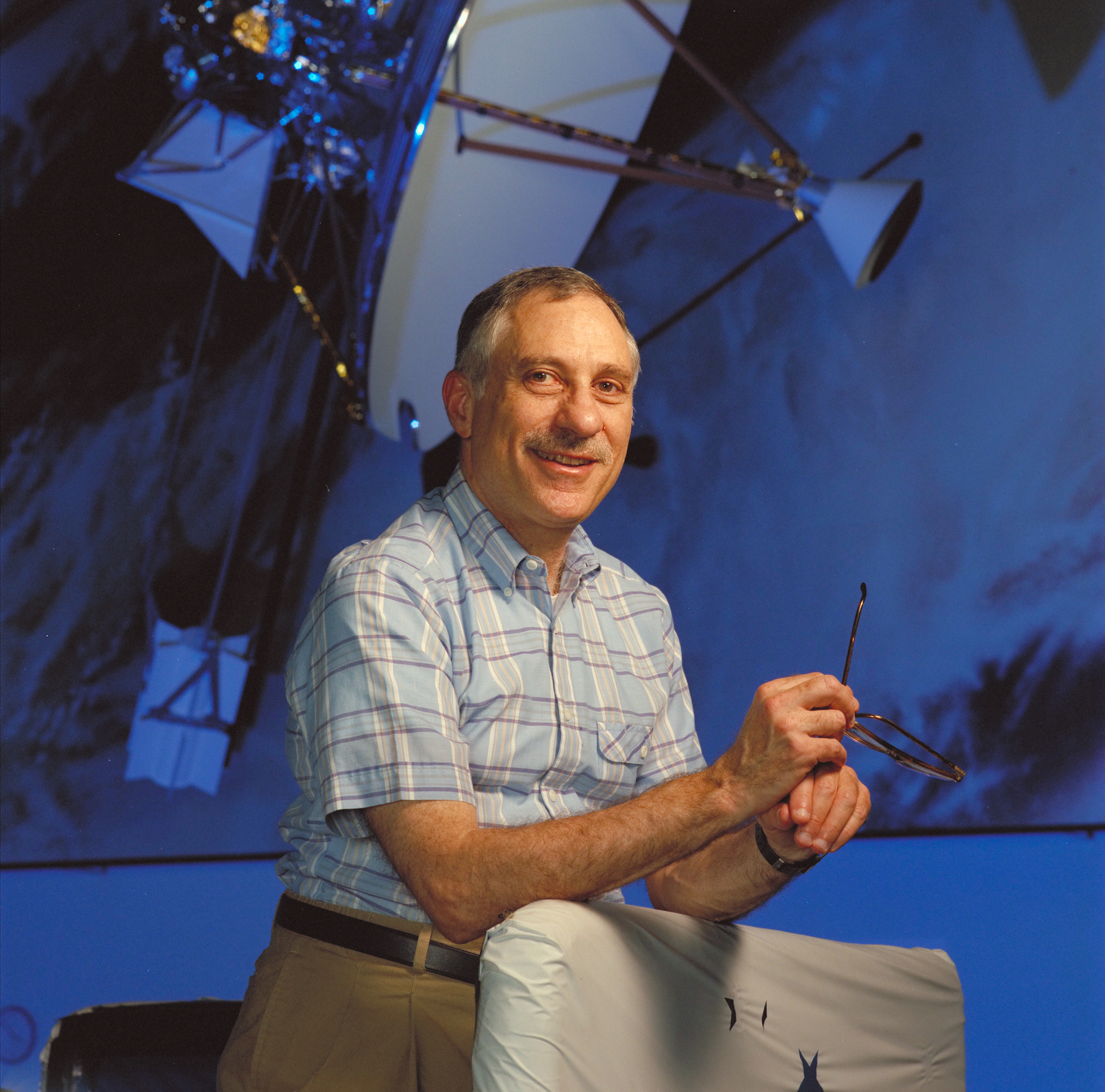
Astrophysicist James B. Pollack

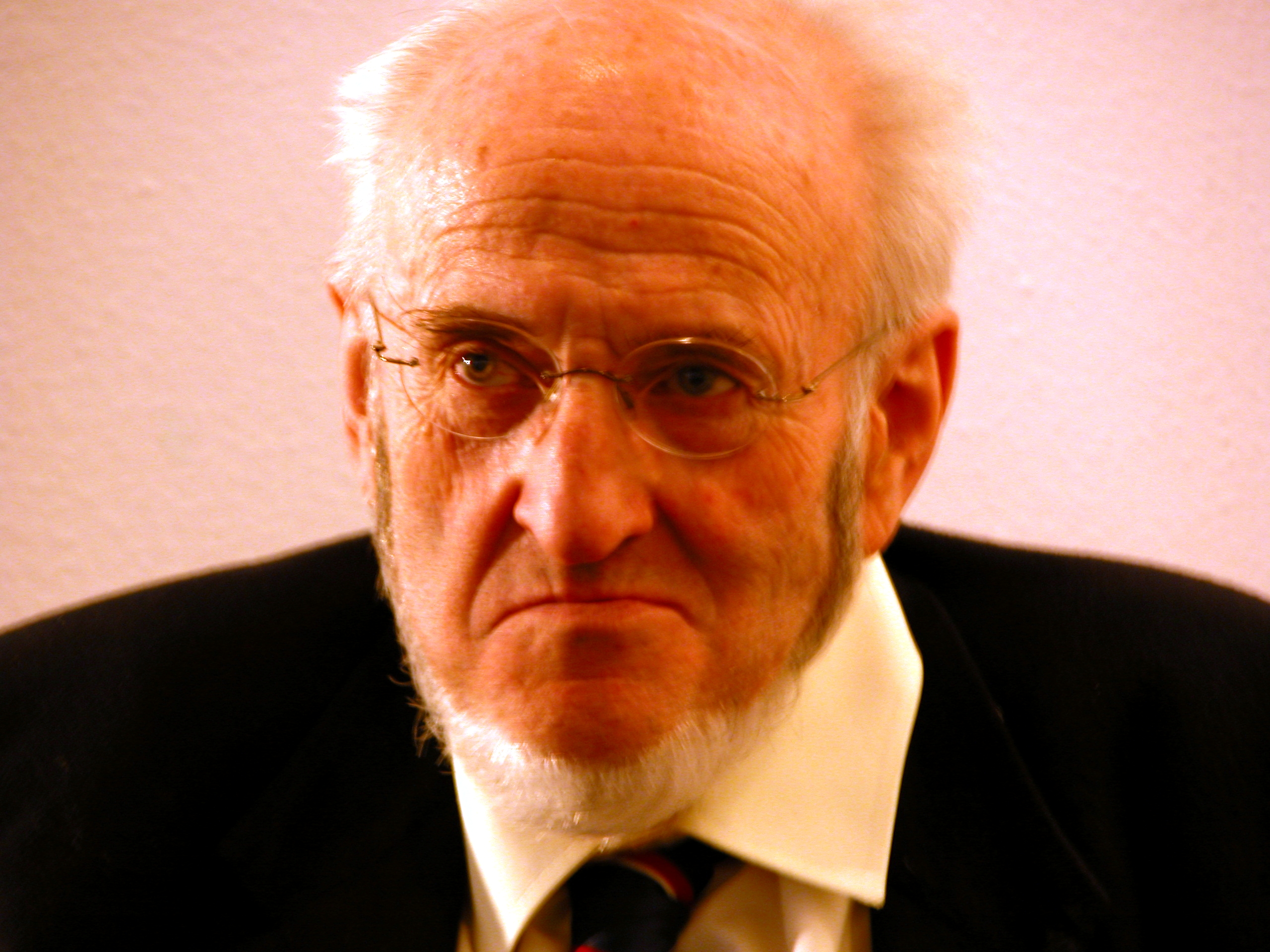
Writer Álvaro Pombo

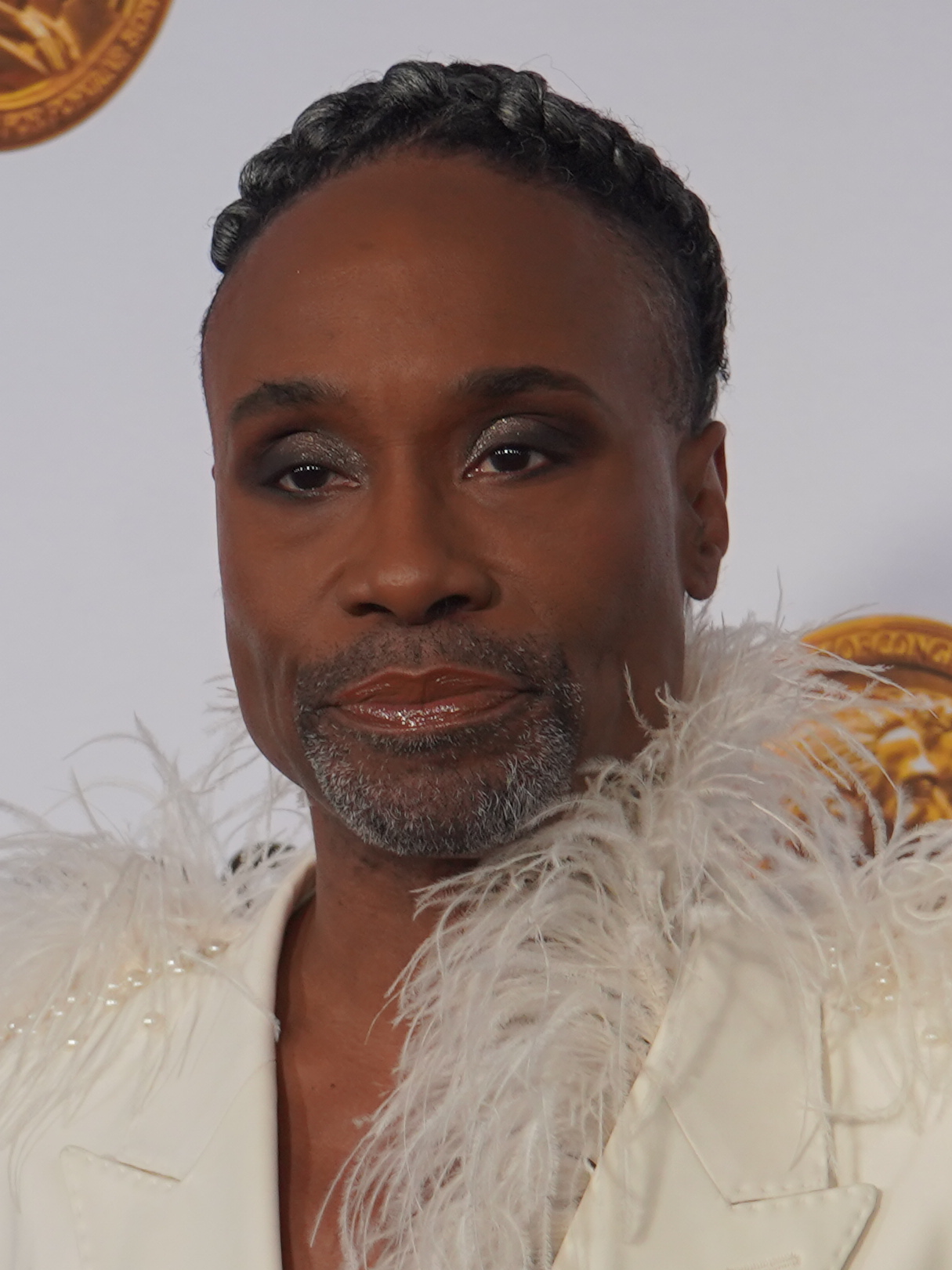
Actor and singer Billy Porter

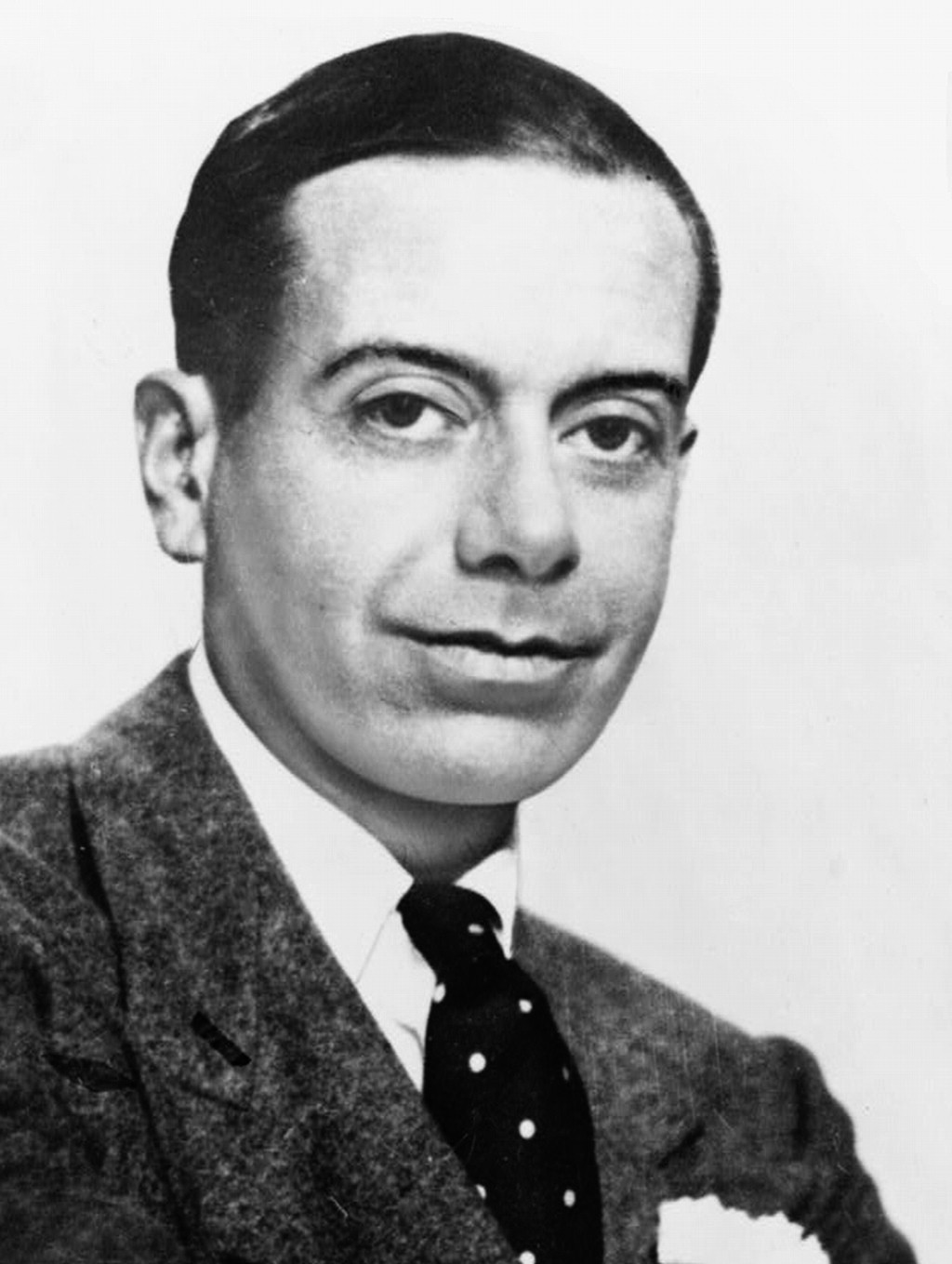
Composer Cole Porter

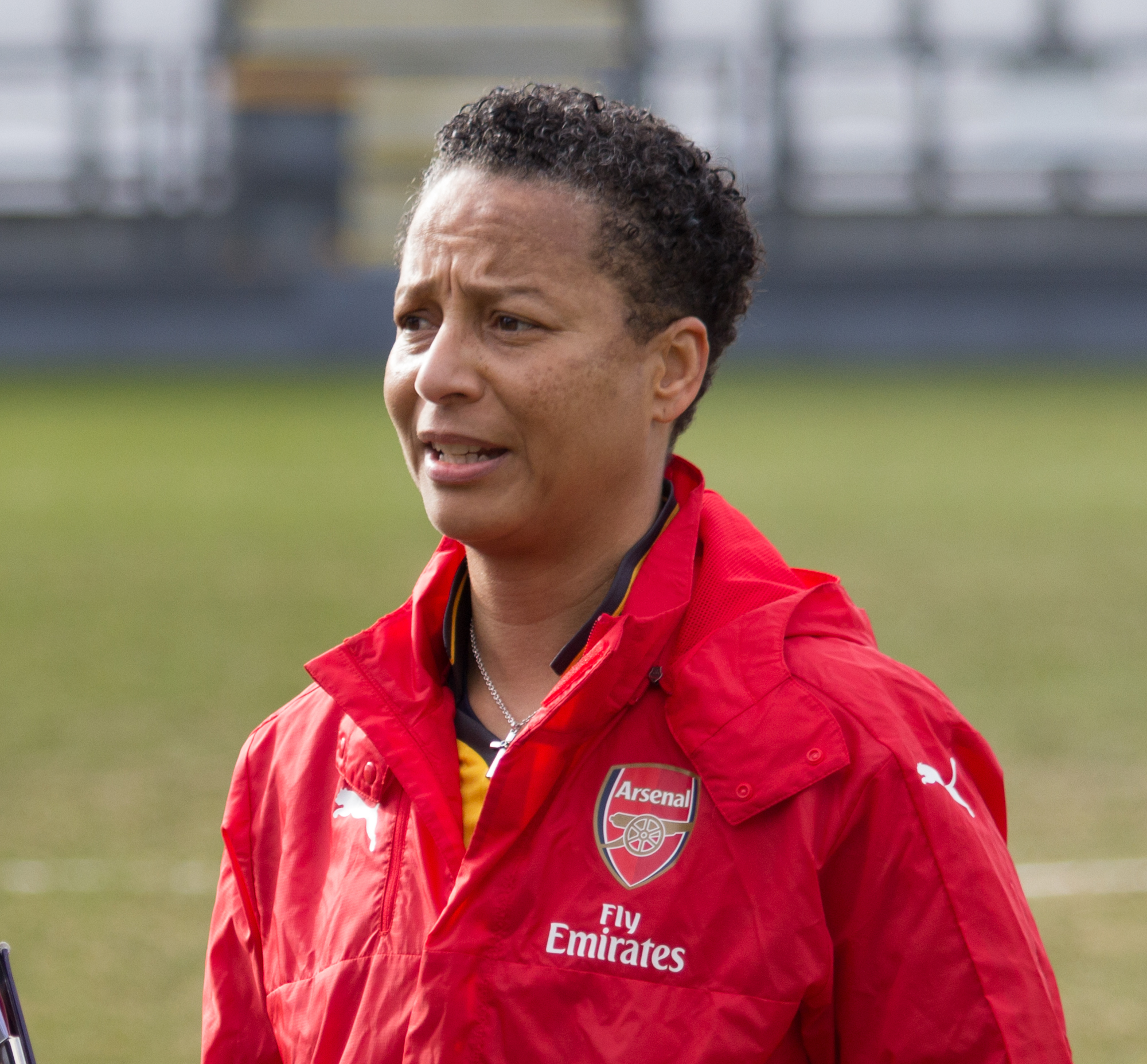
Footballer and manager Hope Powell

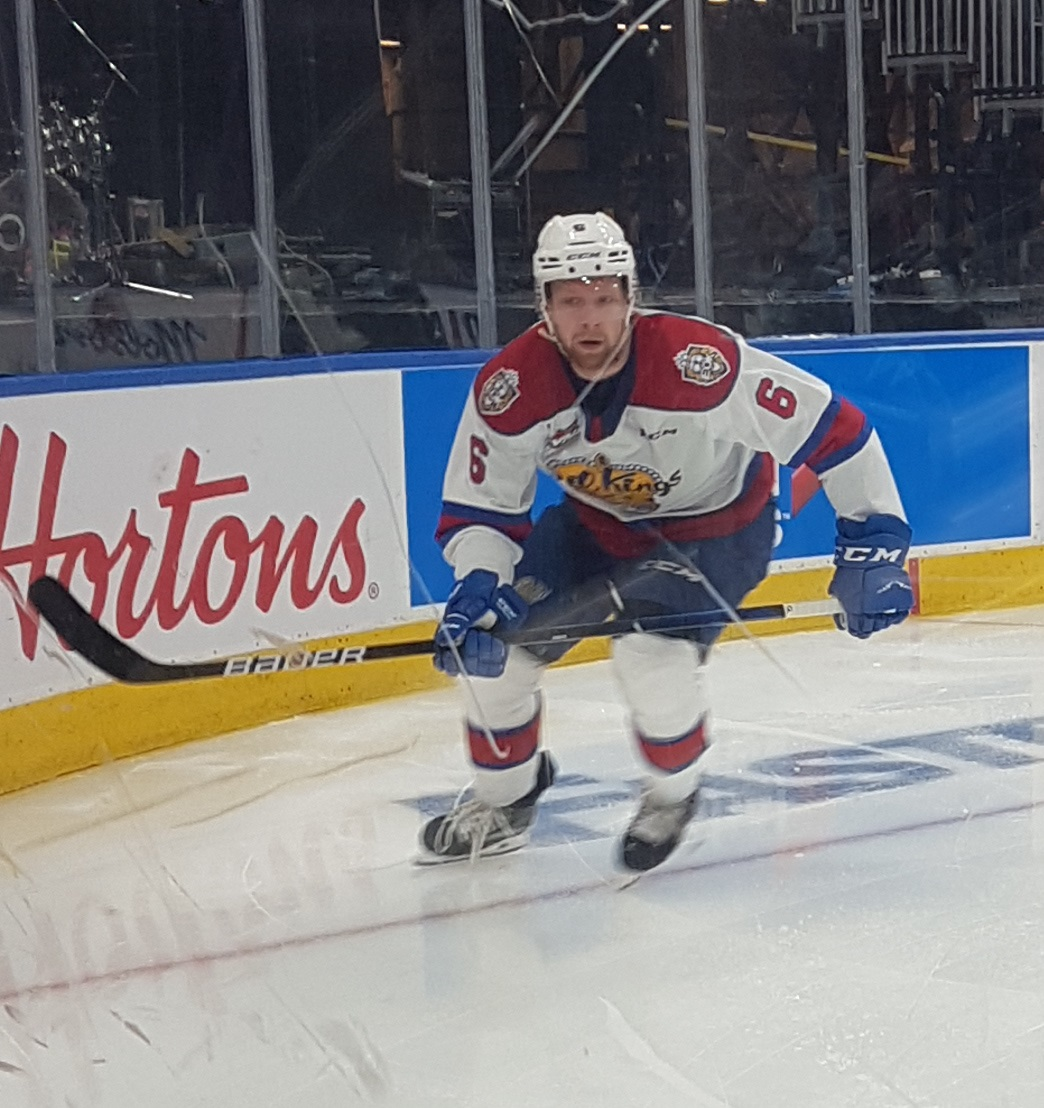
Ice hockey defenceman Luke Prokop

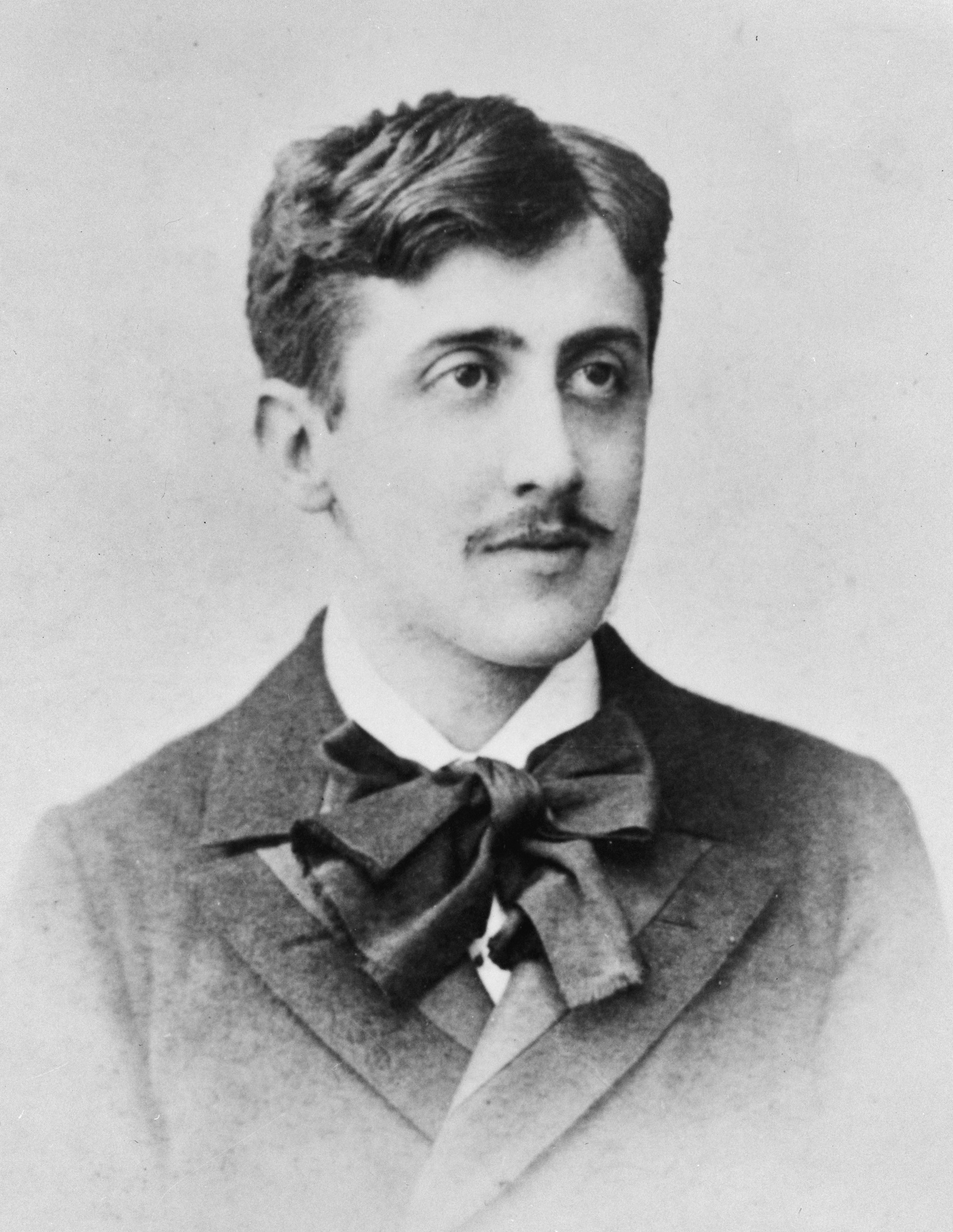
Novelist Marcel Proust

Name	Lifetime	Nationality	Notable as	Notes
Douglas P.	b. 1956	English	Musician (Death in June)	G
Svante Pääbo	b. 1955	Swedish	Biologist, paleogeneticist	B
Olavi Paavolainen	1903–1964	Finnish	Writer	G
Lee Pace	b. 1979	American	Actor	B
Matt Pacifici	b. 1993	American	Soccer player	G
Brian Paddick	b. 1958	English	Police officer, politician	G
Hugh Paddick	1915–2000	English	Actor	G
Steve Padilla	b. 1967	American	Politician	G
Chansey Paech	b. 1987	Australian	Politician, first openly gay Aboriginal MP and speaker in Australia	G
Robert Páez	b. 1994	Venezuelan	Diver	G
Ken Page	1954–2024	American	Actor	G
Tommy Page	1970–2017	American	Pop singer-songwriter	G
Camille Paglia	b. 1947	American	Teacher, social critic	B
Pai Hsien-yung	b. 1937	Taiwanese	Writer	G
Paige	b. 1992	English	Wrestler	B
Peter Paige	b. 1969	American	Actor, director	G
David Paisley	b. 1979	Scottish	Actor	G
Rick Palacio	b. 1974	American	Politician	G
Monica Palacios	b. ?	American	Playwright	L
Manuel Palafox	1887–1959	Mexican	Politician	G
Chuck Palahniuk	b. 1962	American	Writer	G
Anita Pallenberg	b. 1944	German	Model, actor and fashion designer	B
Owen Pallett	b. 1981	Canadian	Musician	G
Renata Pallottini	1931–2021	Brazilian	Writer, translator, theatre professor	L
Ron Palillo	1949–2012	American	Actor, teacher	G
Dave Pallone	b. 1951	American	Major League umpire	G
Pierre Palmade	b. 1968	French	Actor, comedian	G
Alisa Palmer	b. ?	Canadian	Theatre director, playwright	L
Amanda Palmer	b. 1976	American	Singer, musician (The Dresden Dolls)	B
Dan Palmer	b. 1988	Australian	Rugby union footballer	G
Lillian McNeill Palmer	1871–1961	American	Coppersmith, metalsmith	L
Tom G. Palmer	b. 1956	American	Writer	G
Zoie Palmer	b. 1977	English-Canadian	Actor	L
Oriol Pamies	b. 1989	Spanish	Entrepreneur, LGBT activist, tourism expert	G
Pammenes of Thebes	b. ?	Theban	General	G
Sam Pancake	b. ?	American	Actor	G
Maulik Pancholy	b. 1974	American	Actor	G
Šárka Pančochová	b. 1990	Czech	Snowboarder	L
Hayden Panettiere	1989–2026	American	Actor	B
Aleksei Panin	b. 1977	Russian	Actor	B
Marco Pannella	1930–2016	Italian	Politician, civil rights activist	B
Chuck Panozzo	b. 1948	American	Bass guitarist (Styx)	G
Sunil Babu Pant	b. 1972	Nepalese	Politician	G
Antonia Pantoja	1922–2002	American	Educator, social worker	L
Morris Panych	b. 1952	Canadian	Playwright	G
Panzi	b. 1954	American	Businessperson, LGBT rights activist	G
Tomie dePaola	1934–2020	American	Illustrator, writer	G
Nicol Paone	b. 1971	American	Comedian, director, writer, actor	B
Dimitris Papaioannou	b. 1964	Greek	Theatre director, choreographer, visual artist	G
Chris Pappas	b. 1980	American	Politician	G
Anna Paquin	b. 1982	New Zealand	Actor	B
Jaime Parada	b. 1977	Chilean	Gay rights activist, 1st openly gay person elected to public office in Chile	G
Michelle Paradise	b. ?	American	Writer, producer, actress	L
Sergei Parajanov	1924–1990	Armenian	Director	B
Yuvraaj Parashar	b. 1979	Indian	Actor	G
Janet Paraskeva	b. 1946	English	Civil servant	L
Arleen Paré	b. 1946	Canadian	Writer	L
Julieta Paredes	b. 1967	Bolivian	Poet, singer-songwriter, writer	L
Susel Paredes	b. 1963	Peruvian	Lawyer, LGBT rights activist, politician	L
Bob Paris	b. 1959	American	Bodybuilder	G
Sam Park	b. 1985	American	Politician	G
Annise Parker	b. 1956	American	Politician	L
Chris Parker	b. 1990	New Zealand	Actor, comedian, writer	G
Michelle Parkerson	b. ?	American	Filmmaker, academic	L
Graham Parkhurst	b. ?	Canadian	Actor	G
Paul Bonifacio Parkinson	b. 1991	Italian-Canadian	Figure skater	G
Alex Parks	b. 1984	English	Musician, songwriter	L
Arlo Parks	b. 2000	British	Singer-songwriter	B
David Parks	b. 1943	American	Politician	G
Pratibha Parmar	b. ?	British	Filmmaker	L
Kaia Parnaby	b. 1990	Australian	Softball player	L
Larry Parnes	1929–1989	English	Pop music manager	G
Sophia Parnok	1885–1933	Russian	Poet	L
Gina Parody	b. 1973	Colombian	Lawyer, politician; 1st lesbian to serve as the Education Minister of Columbia	L
Lily Parr	1905–1978	English	Footballer	L
Todd Parr	b. 1962	American	Writer	G
Matthew Parris	b. 1949	English	Journalist, former Member of Parliament	G
Man Parrish	b. 1958	American	Singer-songwriter, musician, record producer	G
Parrow	b. 1982	American	Professional wrestler	G
Evalyn Parry	b. ?	Canadian	Musician, actor, playwright	L
Arsham Parsi	b. 1980	Iranian	LGBT rights activist	G
Anja Pärson	b. 1981	Swedish	Alpine skier	L
Jim Parsons	b. 1973	American	Actor	G
Harry Partch	1901–1974	American	Composer, instrument builder	G
Emeric Partos	1905–1975	Hungarian-American	Fashion designer, furrier	G
John Partridge	b. 1971	English	Actor	G
Nick Partridge	b. ?	English	Businessperson, AIDS activist	G
Georgi Partsalev	1925–1989	Bulgarian	Actor	G
Thomas Pasatieri	b. 1945	American	Composer	G
Jean-Claude Pascal	1927–1992	French	Singer, comedian, actor	G
Pier Paolo Pasolini	1922–1975	Italian	Writer, filmmaker	G
Stacie Passon	b. ?	American	Film director, screenwriter	L
Benito Pastoriza Iyodo	1954-2022	Puerto Rican	Writer	G
Walter Pater	1839–1894	English	Writer, literary critic	G
Marissa Paternoster	b. 1986	American	Rock musician (Screaming Females, Noun)	L
Tam Paton	b. 1937	Scottish	Businessperson	G
Paul Patrick	b. 1950	English	Teacher, LGBT rights activist	G
Robert Patrick	1937–2023	American	Playwright	G
Devdutt Pattanaik	b. 1970	Indian	Writer, mythographer	G
Pat Patterson	1941–2020	Canadian	Wrestler	G
Rahsaan Patterson	b. 1974	American	Actor, singer	G
Romaine Patterson	b. 1977	American	Radio personality, LGBT rights activist	L
Derek Pattinson	1930–2006	English	Civil servant, clergy	G
Cindy Patton	b. 1956	American	Historian, sociologist	L
Mark Patton	b. 1964	American	Actor	G
Caroline Paul	b. 1963	American	Writer	L
Paul Oscar	b. 1970	Icelandic	Singer-songwriter, disc jockey	G
Steve Paul	1941–2012	American	Talent manager, nightclub owner	G
John Paulk	b. 1963	American	Author, chef, former conversion therapy advocate	G
Maartje Paumen	b. 1985	Dutch	Field hockey player	L
Pausanias of Orestis	400–336 BC	Greek	Bodyguard	G
Dimitri Pavadé	b. 1989	Réunionese-French	Para-athlete, long-jumper	G
Graham Payn	1918–2005	English	Actor, partner of Noël Coward	G
Waylon Payne	b. 1972	American	Musician	G
David Paynter	1900–1975	Sri Lankan	Painter	G
Heather Peace	b. 1976	English	Actor, musician	L
Peach PRC	b. 1997	Australian	Pop singer	L
Peaches	b. 1968	Canadian	Musician	B
Sarah Peake	b. ?	American	Politician	L
Louise Pearce	1885–1959	American	Pathologist	L
Max Peiffer Watenphul	1896–1976	German	Artist, Bauhaus alumni	G
Peter Pears	1910–1986	English	Opera singer, partner of Benjamin Britten	G
Felicia Pearson	b. 1980	American	Actor, author	L
Lee Pearson	b. 1974	English	Paralympian equestrian	G
Trey Pearson	b. 1980	American	Singer-songwriter, rock musician (Everyday Sunday)	G
Lee Peart	b. 1990	English	Comedian, actor, presenter	G
Dale Peck	b. 1967	American	Writer	G
Orville Peck	b. ?	Canadian	Country musician	G
Alfonso Pecoraro Scanio	b. 1959	Italian	Politician, lawyer, journalist. Former Minister of Agriculture and Minister of Environment	B
Eskil Pedersen	b. 1984	Norwegian	Politician	G
Jamie Pedersen	b. 1968	American	Politician	G
Cauby Peixoto	1931–2016	Brazilian	Singer	G
Paula Pell	b. 1963	American	Screenwriter, actor	L
Carlo Pellegrini	1839–1889	Italian	Painter	G
Shaina Pellington	b. 1999	Canadian	Basketball player	L
Otto Peltzer	1900–1970	German	World record holder in running	G
Jeremy Pemberton	b. 1956	English	First Church of England priest to marry another man, despite official opposition	G
Christopher Oscar Peña	b. ?	American	Playwright, screenwriter, actor, educator	G
Karleen Pendleton Jiménez	b. ?	American-Canadian	Writer	L
Kal Penn	b. 1977	American	Actor, civil servant	G
Sandro Penna	1906–1977	Italian	Writer	G
Marco Pennette	b. 1960	American	Screenwriter	G
Raquel Pennington	b. 1988	American	Mixed martial artist	L
Carole Péon	b. 1978	French	Triathlete	L
Guillaume Pepy	b. 1958	French	Civil servant, railway executive	G
William Armstrong Percy III	b. 1933	American	Writer, historian	G
William Alexander Percy	1885–1942	American	Writer	G
Freya Perdaens	b. 1989	Belgian	Politician	B
Geovana Peres	b. 1977	Brazilian-New Zealand	Boxer	L
Neal Peres Da Costa	b. 1964	Australian	Musician	G
Charles Perez	b. 1964	American	Reporter, news presenter	G
Joel Perez	b. ?	American	Actor	G
John Pérez	b. 1969	American	Politician	G
Lourdes Pérez	b. 1961	Puerto Rican	Singer-songwriter, musician, composer, poet	L
Alicia Elena Pérez Duarte	b. 1953	Mexican	Lawyer, academic	L
Perfume Genius	b. 1981	American	Musician	G
Cristina Peri Rossi	b. ?	Uruguayan	Novelist, poet, translator	L
Anthony Perkins	1932–1992	American	Actor	G or B
Dewayne Perkins	b. 1990	American	Comedian, writer, actor	G
Polly Perkins	b. 1943	English	Pop and cabaret singer, actor	L
Sue Perkins	b. 1969	English	Comedian	L
Néstor Osvaldo Perlongher	1949–1992	Argentine	Poet, anthropologist	G
Dennis Peron	b. 1945	American	LGBT rights activist, Politician	G
Quinton Peron	b. ?	American	One of the 1st male National Football League (NFL) cheerleaders to perform during the Super Bowl	G
Stewart Perowne	1901–1989	English	Diplomat, archaeologist, explorer, historian	G
Conny Perrin	b. 1990	Swiss	Tennis player	L
Elula Perrin	1929–2003	French-Vietnamese	Writer, nightclub co-founder	L
George Perris	b. 1983	Greek-French	Pop and jazz singer	G
Ernest Perron	1908–1961	Swiss	Courtier	G
Michael Holloway Perronne	b. 1974	American	Writer	G
Linda Perry	b. 1965	American	Singer-songwriter, musician (4 Non Blondes), record producer	L
Nicholas Perry	b. 1992	Ukrainian-American	YouTuber, mukbang host under the alias Nikocado Avocado	G
Troy D. Perry	b. 1940	American	Clergy	G
Stan Persky	b. 1941	Canadian	Writer	G
Miss Coco Peru	b. 1967	American	Comedian, drag performer	G
Mayssa Pessoa	b. 1984	Brazilian	Handball player	L
Tefi Pessoa	b. 1990/1991	American	Influencer, host	L
Nesthy Petecio	b. 1992	Filipino	Boxer	L
Peter	b. 1952	Japanese	Singer, dancer, actor	G
Babett Peter	b. 1988	German	Footballer	L
Beate Peters	b. 1959	German	Javelin thrower	L
Julie Anne Peters	b. 1952	American	Writer	L
Robert Peters	1924–2014	American	Poet, teacher	G
Brian Wayne Peterson	b. c. 1971	American	Screenwriter, television producer	G
Cassandra Peterson	b. 1951	American	Actor, TV host known for her character Elvira, Mistress of the Dark	B
Nicholas Petricca	b. ?	American	Rock singer, musician (Walk the Moon)	B
Desislava Petrova	b. 1980	Bulgarian	Activist	L
Loana Petrucciani	1977-2026	French	Reality television personality	B
David Pevsner	b. ?	American	Actor, singer, dancer, writer	G
Roger Peyrefitte	1907–2000	French	Writer, diplomat	G
Guillermo Pfening	b. 1978	Argentine	Actor, film producer	G
Michael Phair	b. 1950	Canadian	Politician	G
John Pham	b. ?	Vietnamese-American	Molecular biologist	G
Johnnie Phelps	1922–1997	American	Women's Army Corps soldier	L
Kerryn Phelps	b. 1957	Australian	Physician	L
Prince Philipp of Hesse	1896–1980	German	Nobleman, politician	B
Philippe I, Duke of Orléans	1640–1701	French	Duke	G
Carl Phillips	b. 1959	American	Writer	G
Erin Phillips	b. 1985	Australian	Basketball player	L
Gretchen Phillips	b. 1963	American	Musician	L
Joe Phillips	b. 1969	American	Comic artist	G
Paul Phillips	b. ?	American	Musician	G
Randy Phillips	b. 1990	American	LGBT rights activist, military	G
Zane Phillips	b. 1993	American	Actor	G
Glyn Philpot	1884–1937	English	Painter, sculptor	G
Dominique Phinot	c. 1510–c. 1556	Franco-Flemish	Composer	G
Phranc	b. 1957	American	Singer, musician	L
Andrzej Piaseczny	b. 1971	Polish	Singer-songwriter, actor, TV personality	G
Felice Picano	1944–2025	American	Writer, publisher, literary critic	G
David Pichler	b. 1968	American	Olympic diver	G
Emma Pieczynska-Reichenbach	1854–1927	Swiss	Feminist activist, abolitionist, suffragette	L
Jan Pieńkowski	b. 1936	Polish-British	Author	G
Tuulikki Pietilä	1917–2009	Finnish	Artist	L
Leah Lakshmi Piepzna-Samarasinha	b. 1975	Canadian	Poet, educator	L
Ben J. Pierce	b. 1999	American	YouTuber, singer-songwriter, actor	G
David Hyde Pierce	b. 1959	American	Actor	G
Jack Pierson	b. 1960	American	Artist	G
Kate Pierson	b. 1948	American	Rock musician (The B-52's)	B
Donnya Piggott	b. ?	Barbadian	Tech entrepreneur, designer, human rights advocate	L
Marco Pigossi	b. 1989	Brazilian	Actor, producer	G
Stefano Pilati	b. 1965	Italian	Fashion designer	G
Richard Pillard	b. 1933	American	Professor	G
Darryl Pinckney	b. 1953	American	Novelist, playwright, essayist	G
Robert Pincus-Witten	1935–2018	American	Art historian	G
Kristi Pinderi	b. 1982	Albanian	LGBT rights activist	G
Virgilio Piñera	1912–1979	Cuban	Author, playwright	G
Miguel Piñero	1946–1988	Puerto Rican	Playwright, actor	G
Nimrod Ping	1947–2006	English	Architect, politician	G
Fernanda Pinilla	b. 1994	Chilean	Footballer	L
Etai Pinkas	b. 1973	Israeli	LGBT activist, politician	G
Daniel Pinkham	1923–2006	American	Composer, musician	G
Doug Pinnick	b. 1950	American	Rock musician (King's X)	G
Danny Pintauro	b. 1976	American	Actor	G
Ricardo Pinto	b. 1961	Portuguese-British	Computer game programmer, writer	G
Enrique Pinti	b. 1939	Argentine	Actor, comedian	G
Michał Piróg	b. 1979	Polish	Dancer, choreographer, TV presenter	G
Margarita Pisano	1932–2015	Chilean	Architect, writer	L
Oleksandr Piskunov	b. 1991	Ukrainian	Actor	G
Dean Pitchford	b. 1951	American	Songwriter, screenwriter, director, actor, novelist	G
Kenneth Pitt	1922–2019	English	Publicist, talent manager	G
Eduardo Pitta	b. 1949	Portuguese	Poet, writer	G
Aslie Pitter	b. ?	English	Footballer	G
Leanne Pittsford	b. 1980/1981	American	Entrepreneur	L
Roberto Piva	1937–2010	Brazilian	Poet, writer	G
Alejandra Pizarnik	1936–1972	Argentine	Poet	L
Richard Plant	1910–1998	German	Writer	G
Peter Plate	b. 1967	German	Pop musician (Rosenstolz)	G
August Graf von Platen-Hallermünde	1796–1835	German	Poet, dramatist	G
Plato	428/427 or 424/423 – 348/347 BC	Greek	Philosopher	G
Ben Platt	b. 1993	American	Actor, singer, songwriter	G
Aubrey Plaza	b. 1984	American	Actor, comedian	B
William Plomer	1903–1973	South African-British	Author	G
Jack Plotnick	b. 1968	American	Actor	G
Guglielmo Plüschow	1852–1930	German	Photographer	G
Pocah	b. 1994	Brazilian	Singer-songwriter	B
Mark Pocan	b. 1964	American	Politician	G
Werner Pochath	1939–1993	Austrian	Actor	G
Brian Pockar	1959–1992	Canadian	Figure skater	G
Jeremy Podeswa	b. 1962	Canadian	Film and TV director	G
Nadia Podoroska	b. 1997	Argentine	Tennis player	L
Elena Pogrebizhskaya	b. 1972	Russian	Journalist, documentary filmmaker, rock musician	L
Zack Polanski	b. 1982	English	Politician	G
Lina Poletti	1885–1971	Italian	Feminist	L
Prince Edmond de Polignac	1834–1901	French	Composer, aristocrat	G
Yehuda Poliker	b. 1950	Israeli	Singer, songwriter, musician, painter	G
Jared Polis	b. 1975	American	Politician	G
Jon Polito	1950–2016	American	Actor	G
Patrik-Ian Polk	b. 1973	American	TV director, producer	G
James B. Pollack	1938–1994	American	Astrophysicist	G
Ingrid Pollard	b. 1953	Guyanese-British	Photographer	L
Luke Pollard	b. 1980	English	Politician	G
Joey Pollari	b. 1994	American	Actor	G
Eva Polna	b. 1975	Russian	Singer, composer, songwriter	B
Álvaro Pombo	b. 1939	Spanish	Writer	G
Jacek Poniedziałek	b. 1965	Polish	Actor, theatre director	G
Norma Bahia Pontes	1941–2010	Brazilian	Filmmaker, writer	L
Léa Pool	b. 1950	Swiss-Canadian	Filmmaker, educator	L
Wakefield Poole	1936–2021	American	Dancer, choreographer, theatrical director, pornographic film director	G
Carole Pope	b. 1950	Canadian	Musician	L
Jeremy Pope	b. 1992	American	Actor, singer	G
Paul Popham	1941–1987	American	Gay rights activist, founder of Gay Men's Health Crisis	G
Inger Pors Olsen	b. 1966	Danish	Rower	L
Stephen Port	b. 1975	English	Convicted serial killer and rapist	G
Mary Portas	b. 1962	English	Fashion designer	L
Peter Porte	b. 1985	American	Actor	G
Al Porter	b. 1993	Irish	Actor, comedian, radio and TV personality	G
Billy Porter	b. 1969	American	Entertainer	G
Charlie Porter	b. 1973	British	Fashion journalist	G
Cole Porter	1891–1964	American	Composer	G
Dorothy Porter	1954–2008	Australian	Poet	L
Zac Posen	b. 1980	American	Fashion designer	G
Jill Posener	b. 1953	English	Photographer, playwright	L
Zizi Possi	b. 1956	Brazilian	Singer	B
Sue-Ann Post	b. 1964	Australian	Comedian, writer	L
Wallace Potts	1947–2006	American	Film director, screenwriter, archivist	G
Alan Poul	b. 1954	American	Film and TV producer, director	G
Francis Poulenc	1899–1963	French	Composer	B
Søren Pape Poulsen	b. 1971	Danish	Politician	G
Hope Powell	b. 1966	English	Footballer, manager	L
Isaac Cole Powell	b. 1994	American	Actor, singer	G
Natalie Powell	b. 1990	Welsh	Judoka	L
Karin Power	b. 1982/83	American	Politician	L
Lisa Power	b. 1954	Welsh	LGBT activist	L
Paul David Power	b. ?	Canadian	Playwright, actor, theatre director	G
Kid Congo Powers	b. 1959	American	Musician (The Gun Club, The Cramps, Nick Cave and the Bad Seeds)	G
Susan Powter	b. 1957	Australian-American	Author, motivational speaker, fitness guru	L
James Pratt and John Smith	1805–1835, 1795–1835	English	Groom and laborer executed for sodomy	G
Louise Pratt	b. 1972	Australian	Politician	L
Minnie Bruce Pratt	1946–2023	American	Writer, poet	L
Rosa von Praunheim	1942–2025	German	Film director, author, gay rights activist	G
Keith Prentice	1940–1992	American	Actor	G
Scott Presler	b. 1987/1988	American	Conservative activist	G
John Preston	1945–1994	American	Writer, LGBT rights activist	G
Augustus Prew	b. 1987	English	Actor	G
Adam Price	b. 1968	Welsh	Politician	G
Christopher Price	1967–2002	English	Journalist, TV presenter	G
Dennis Price	1915–1973	English	Actor	G
Gordon Price	b. ?	Canadian	Politician	G
Mark de Solla Price	b. 1960	American	Writer, AIDS activist	G
Victoria Price	b. 1962	American	Author, public speaker	L
Vincent Price	1911–1993	American	Actor	B
Lionel Pries	1897–1968	American	Architect, artist, professor	G
Peter Prijdekker	b. 1948	Dutch	Swimmer	G
Edward Irenaeus Prime-Stevenson	1858–1942	American	Novelist	G
Tom Prior	b. 1990	English	Actor	G
Charlotte Prodger	b. 1974	English	Filmmaker, artist	L
Luke Prokop	b. 2002	Canadian	Ice hockey player, 1st NHL player to come out publicly as gay	G
Simon Proulx-Sénécal	b. 1991	Canadian	Ice dancer	G
Marcel Proust	1871–1922	French	Writer	B
Animal Prufrock	b. 1975	American	Rock musician (Bitch and Animal)	L
Katie Pruitt	b. 1994	American	Singer–songwriter	L
Richard Pryor	1940–2005	American	Stand-up comedian, actor, writer	B
Ptazeta	b. 2000	Spanish	Rapper, singer	L
Charles Pugh	b. 1971	American	Journalist, politician	G
Sergio Puglia	b. 1950	Uruguayan	Chef, restaurateur, TV presenter	G
W. H. Pugmire	b. 1951	American	Horror writer	G
Janne Puhakka	1995–2024	Finnish	Ice hockey player	G
Manuel Puig	1932–1990	Argentine	Writer	G
Sarah Puntigam	b. 1992	Austrian	Footballer	L
Angus Purden	b. 1974	Scottish	Model, TV presenter	G
James Purdy	1914–2009	American	Writer	G
Chris Pureka	b. ?	American	Singer-songwriter	G
Brontez Purnell	b. ?	American	Writer, musician, dancer, director	G
Sarah Purser	1848–1943	Irish	Stained glass artist	L
Shannon Purser	b. 1997	American	Actor	B
Martin C. Putna	b. 1968	Czech	Literary historian, university teacher, publicist, essayist	G
Puyi	1906–1967	Chinese	Last Emperor of China	G
Olivier Py	b. 1965	French	Director, actor, writer	G
Viktor Pylypenko	b. 1986	Ukrainian	Soldier, activist	G

A · Ba–Bh · Bi–Bz · C · D · E · F · G · H · I · J · K · L · M · N · O
P · Q · R · Sa–Sc · Sd–Si · Sj–Sz · T · U · V · W · X · Y · Z

== Q ==
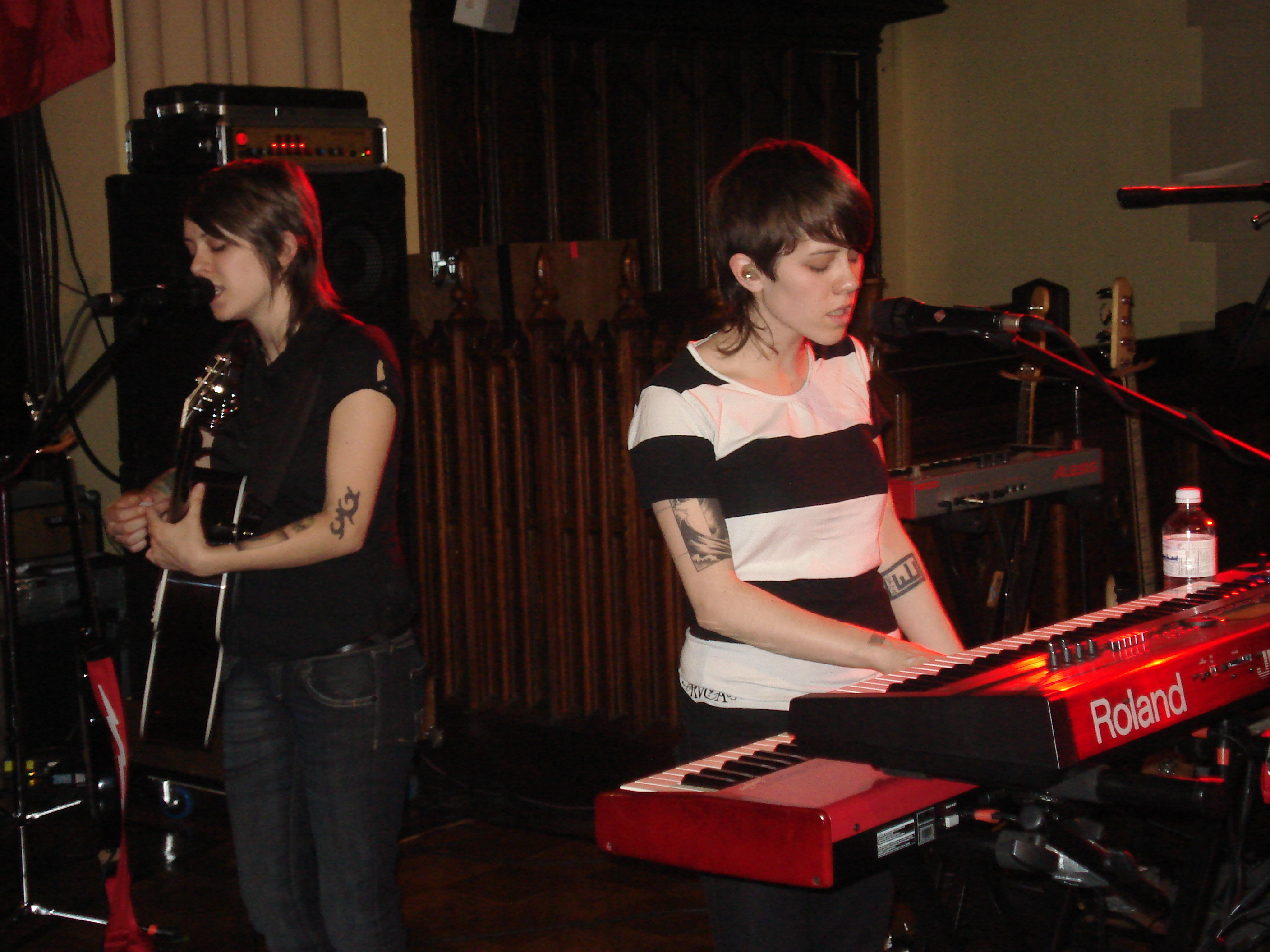
Musicians Tegan and Sara Quin

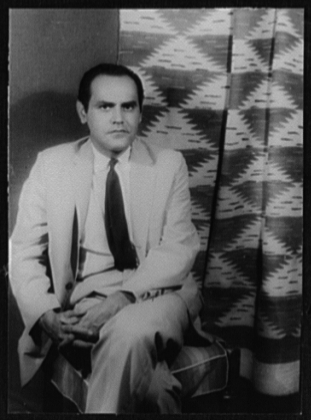
Theatre director José Quintero

Name	Lifetime	Nationality	Notable as	Notes
QBoy	b. 1978	English	Rapper, music producer	G
Yair Qedar	b. 1969	Israeli	Filmmaker, journalist, activist	G
Qiao Qiao	b. 1979	Chinese	Musician	L
Qiu Miaojin	1969–1995	Taiwanese	Novelist	L
George Quaintance	1902–1957	American	Artist	G
DJ Qualls	b. 1978	American	Actor, producer, model	G
Andy Quan	b. 1969	Canadian	Writer	G
Celia Quansah	b. 1996	English	Rugby sevens player	L
Virgínia Quaresma	1882–1973	Portuguese	Journalist	L
David Quarrey	b. ?	British	Diplomat	G
Justin Quarry	b. ?	American	Writer	G
Carol Queen	b. 1957	American	Writer, sexologist	B
Ruben Quesada	b. ?	American	Educator, editor	G
Michael Quercio	b. 1963	American	Singer, musician (The Three O'Clock)	G
Richard Quest	b. 1962	English	Journalist	G
Chris Quick	b. 1988	Scottish	Filmmaker	G
Milo Quifes	b. 2001	Spanish	Actor, writer	G
Allie Quigley	b. 1986	American	Basketball player	L
Roger Quilter	1877–1953	English	Composer	G
Sara Quin	b. 1980	Canadian	Musician (Tegan and Sara)	L
Tegan Quin	b. 1980	Canadian	Musician (Tegan and Sara)	L
Christine C. Quinn	b. 1966	American	Politician	L
D. Michael Quinn	1944–2021	American	Religious historian	G
Patrick Quinn	1950–2006	American	Actor	G
Nitza Quiñones Alejandro	b. 1951	American	U.S. District Court judge; 1st lesbian Latina to be appointed to serve as a federal judge	L
Alexandre Quintanilha	b. 1945	Portuguese	Biologist, educator	G
José Quintero	1924–1999	Panamanian	Theatre director	G
Zachary Quinto	b. 1977	American	Actor	G
Everett Quinton	1952–2023	American	Actor	G
Walter Quiroz	b. 1972	Argentine	Actor	G

== See also ==
- List of gay, lesbian or bisexual people
