= List of Israeli films of 1988 =

A list of films produced by the Israeli film industry in 1988.

== 1988 releases ==
=== Unknown premiere date ===
Premiere	Title	Director	Cast	Genre	Notes	Ref
?	Lool (Hebrew: לול)	Boaz Davidson and Uri Zohar	Arik Einstein, Shalom Hanoch, Uri Zohar	Comedy	Made for TV film which combines selected skits from an early 1970s TV show of the same name	
?	Ha-Kayitz Shel Aviya (Hebrew: הקיץ של אביה, lit. "The Summer of Aviya")	Eli Cohen	Gila Almagor, Kaipu Cohen	Biography, Drama	Won the Silver Bear at Berlin	
?	Nisuim Fiktiveem (Hebrew: נישואין פיקטיביים, lit. "Marriage of Convenience")	Haim Bouzaglo	Shlomo Bar-Aba, Irit Sheleg	Drama		
?	Makom L'Yad Hayam (Hebrew: מקום ליד הים, lit. "A Place by the Sea")	Raphael Rebibo	Alon Aboutboul	Drama		
?	Tel Aviv-Los Angeles (Hebrew: תל אביב-לוס אנג'לס)	Shmuel Imberman	Dudu Topaz	Drama		
?	Lemon Popsicle VIII (Hebrew: אסקימו לימון 8 - בלוז לקיץ)	Reinhard Schwabenitzky	Yftach Katzur, Zachi Noy, Jonathan Sagall	Comedy	Israeli-German co-production	
?	Melech Hasalim (Hebrew: מלך הסלים, lit. "Hoops King")	Dubi Gal	Dubi Gal	Comedy		
?	Matzlema Bli Busha (Hebrew: מצלמה בלי בושה, lit. "Shameless Camera")	Yehuda Barkan	Yehuda Barkan	Comedy		
?	Ha-Yanshouf (Hebrew: הינשוף, lit. "The owl")	Amnon Rubinstein	Assi Dayan, Liora Rivlin, Ofra Weingarten	Drama		
?	Mis'chakim Ba'Horef (Hebrew: משחקים בחורף, lit. "Winter Games")	Ram Loevy	Moshe Ivgy	Drama		
?	Helem Krav (Hebrew: הלם קרב, lit. "Shell shock")	Yoel Sharon	Dan Turgeman, Anat Atzmon	Drama		
?	Talveh Li Et Ishteha (Hebrew: תלווה לי את אשתך, lit. "Lend Me Your Wife")	Ze'ev Revach	Ze'ev Revach, Yona Elian, Dan Toren, Aryeh Moskona	Comedy		
?	El Atzmi (Hebrew: אל עצמי, lit. "On My Own")	Tamir Paul	Arik Ohana, Tehiya Danon, Roy Bar-Natan	Drama		
?	Biglal Hamilkhama Hahi (Hebrew: בגלל המלחמה ההיא, "Because of That War")	Orna Ben-Dor Niv	Yehuda Poliker, Yaakov Gilad	Documentary		

== Awards ==
=== Ophir Award ===	=== Wolgin Award ===

== See also ==
- 1988 in Israel
