= 1988 Negev bus hijacking =

Militant attack in Israel

Coordinates: 31.1497°N 34.9838°E

Mothers' bus attack
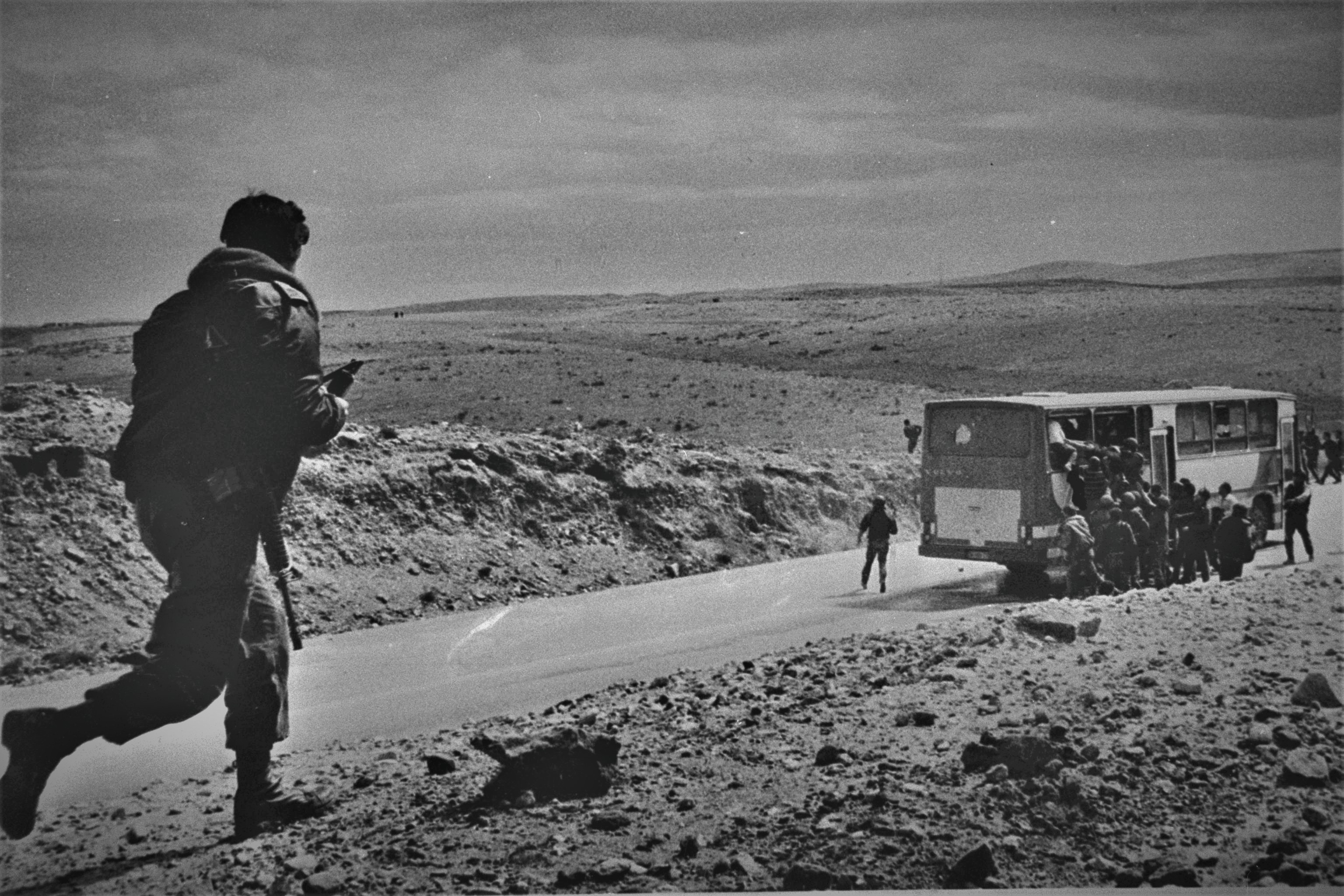

- Location: In southern Israel near the Bedouin village of Aroer
- Date: 7 March 1988
- Weapons: AK-47 rifles Carl Gustav M/45 submachine gun hand grenades
- Deaths: 3 Israeli civilians (+ 3 attackers)
- Injuries: 8 Israeli civilians
- Perpetrator: 3 assailants. Palestine Liberation Organization claimed responsibility

The Mothers' bus attack refers to the 1988 hijacking of an Israeli civilian bus carrying workers to the Negev Nuclear Research Center during the First Intifada. Three Arab militants took 11 passengers hostage and executed two passengers. The bus was then stormed by Yamam, Israel's elite counter-terrorism unit. In the 40-second takeover operation, all three hijackers were killed, along with one of the hostages.

The incident was named the "mothers' bus attack" because many of the passengers were working mothers.

== The attack ==
During the night of Monday, 7 March 1988, three armed members of the Palestine Liberation Organization infiltrated the border between Israel and Egypt near Ramat Nafha, a desert terrain west of Mitzpe Ramon. They were armed with AK-47 rifles, a Carl Gustav M/45 submachine gun and hand grenades. At around 6:30 am, they opened fire on a white Renault carrying four unarmed soldiers heading north to a physical training exercise. The soldiers fled on foot and the gunmen commandeered their car, and drove it north in the direction of Sde Boker, then west onto the highway connecting Beersheba with Dimona.

As they drove westward, the soldiers whose car was commandeered alerted the authorities, and roadblocks were set up by the police on the anticipated route. At around 7:15 am, the gunmen crashed through a police roadblock near the Dimona–Yeruham junction, and began firing indiscriminately, with the police in pursuit. They shot at a mini-van carrying four schoolteachers, whose passengers managed to escape after their driver accelerated toward the gunmen. They also fired at a semi-trailer which was stopped on the highway by the shooting. At around 8:00 am, a bus carrying workers to their jobs at the Negev Nuclear Research Center near Dimona arrived at the scene, near the hilltop Bedouin village of Aroer. When the hijackers opened fire on the bus, the driver opened the door and some passengers managed to escape on foot. The hijackers took over the bus with 11 passengers still on board, including ten women and a man who had been unable to escape.

By that time, Israeli police and Army units surrounded the site, and Haim Benayoun, commander of the Negev police region, began negotiating with the hijackers. One of the first units on site was Yamam, the Israeli police's elite counter-terrorism unit, which arrived before Sayeret Matkal, the IDF's elite counter terrorism unit, whose helicopters had been given erroneous information regarding the location of the incident. All Army and police units came under the command of Major General Yitzhak Mordechai. The hijackers demanded the release of all PLO prisoners incarcerated as a result of the uprising in the occupied territories, and set a 30-minute ultimatum to see a representative of the Red Cross, or they would start executing hostages. Yamam officers collected valuable information regarding the number of hijackers and their position inside the bus from the bus passengers who managed to escape. The Yamam placed snipers around the bus, and tracked movements in it with binoculars. Based on the intelligence collected and the surveillance information, the Yamam's commander, Alik Ron, prepared an assault plan.

As the 30 minutes drew to a close, the gunmen began shooting out the bus windows, and tossed a grenade which failed to explode at the security forces surrounding the bus. Shortly thereafter, at 10:25 am, they executed the male hostage, Victor Ram, a 39-year-old father of three, shooting him in the chest, and one of the women, Miriam Ben-Yair, 46, a mother of four. At that point, Mordechai gave the order to the Yamam to storm the bus. Yamam snipers opened fire, while Yamam fighters breached the bus's windows and doors from 3 directions, tossing stun grenades to disorient the hijackers. In 30–40 seconds, they took over the bus, killing all three hijackers, but not before the hijackers managed to kill another hostage – Rina Shiratky, 31, a mother of two. Eight other hostages were lightly wounded.

== Aftermath ==
The event is notable as the first example of classical terrorist tactics against Israeli civilians during the First Intifada, which up to that point was known as a popular uprising primarily involving civil disobedience, mass protests, demonstrations, rioting and limited violence.

The Israeli government pointed to the incident as proof that the Intifada is a violent, anti-civilian terrorist campaign. Prime Minister Yitzhak Shamir was quoted as saying "The terrorists try to attack us daily. These are the same individuals who are inciting disturbances in the territories", and then-Defense Minister Yitzhak Rabin described the incident as part of a major PLO effort to show that terrorism remains the principal means by which its political goals will be achieved.

Palestinian leaders feared they would lose world sympathy for the Intifada, which until that point was viewed as a popular nationalist uprising conducted by civilians. Sari Nusseibeh called the hijacking a "deplorable act", and said "It's very worrying, because the whole point of the thing is to have a so-called white revolution in which people don't use any arms."

It was also the first time that Yamam, established in 1974 for these kind of missions, was called in instead of Sayeret Matkal, the Israeli Army's counter-terrorism unit. For many years, there had been a preference to use the latter, brought about by the fact that many key decision makers in top security and political positions in the Israeli government were former Sayeret Matkal officers, with loyalty to that unit.

It has been described as one of the most complicated rescue missions in Israel's history, with attackers who were better armed and more determined than their predecessors. It has since become a benchmark for counter-terrorism hostage rescue missions.

Israeli intelligence concluded that the hijacking of the bus had been planned and ordered by PLO military leader Khalil al-Wazir, and as a response, it is believed that they recommended a complex operation to assassinate him at his home in Tunis, carried out a few weeks later.

== See also ==
- Palestinian political violence
