= Freya Perdaens =

Belgian politician

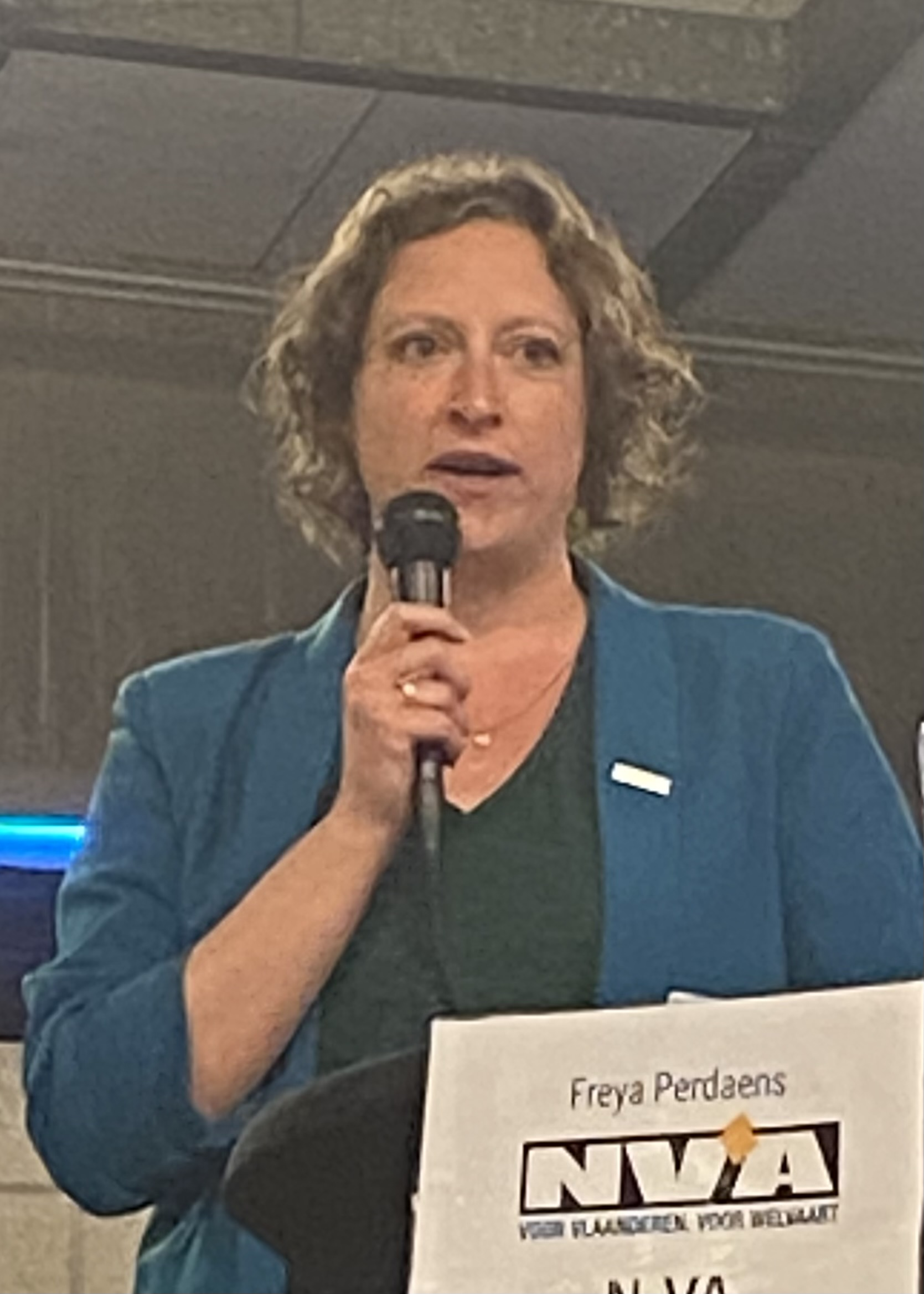
- Perdaens in 2024

Member of the Flemish Parliament
- Incumbent
- Assumed office 2019

Senator
- Incumbent
- Assumed office 2019

Personal details
- Born: 29 January 1989 (age 37) Mechelen
- Party: N-VA

Freya Perdaens (born 29 January 1989) is a Belgian politician of the New Flemish Alliance who has served as a member of the Flemish Parliament since 2019.

== Biography ==
Perdaens comes from Nekkerspoel. She completed a degree in communications at UCLouvain in 2010. After graduating she worked as a recruitment consultant before working in marketing for a solar panel company. Perdaens became a member of the municipal council of Mechelen in 2016. In the municipal elections of 2018, the N-VA Mechelen department chose Perdaens as the list leader. Since then, she has served as leader of the opposition on Mechelen council as an N-VA municipal councilor.

In the elections of 26 May 2019, Perdaens was elected as a Flemish Member of Parliament on the list of the N-VA in the Antwerp Constituency. After the election, she was designated by the N-VA as a state Senator. Perdaens is bisexual and has focused on LGBT rights in her political career.
