= Because of That War =

- Directed by: Orna Ben-Dor Niv
- Written by: Orna Ben-Dor Niv
- Produced by: Samuel Altman, David Schutz
- Starring: Yehuda Poliker, Yaakov Gilad
- Cinematography: Oren Schmukler
- Edited by: Rachel Yagil
- Music by: Yehuda Poliker
- Production company: Manor Productions Ltd.
- Release date: 1988
- Running time: 93 minutes
- Country: Israel
- Language: Hebrew

Because of That War (Hebrew: בגלל המלחמה ההיא, Biglal Hamilkhama Hahi) is a feature-length Hebrew-language documentary about Yehuda Poliker and Ya'akov Gilad, the sons of Holocaust survivors.

== History ==
The movie, which came out in 1988, was written and directed by Orna Ben-Dor Niv.

It was shown in Germany under the title Wegen dieses Krieges.

== See also ==
- Israeli cinema
