= Justin Quarry =

American writer

Justin Quarry is an American writer. He is a graduate of the MFA Program in Creative Writing at the University of Virginia, where he was a Henry Hoyns Fellow. His essays have appeared in The New York Times, The Guardian, The New York Daily News, Salon, The Chronicle of Higher Education, and Longreads. His short stories have been published in a number of magazines, including TriQuarterly, The Southern Review, New England Review, Alaska Quarterly Review, Sou'wester, CutBank, and The Normal School, which awarded him the Normal Prize in Fiction. He is also the recipient of the Robert Olen Butler Short Fiction Prize, a grant from the Elizabeth George Foundation, and an Individual Artist Fellowships from both the Tennessee Arts Commission and the Arkansas Arts Council.

He teaches English and creative writing at Vanderbilt University.
