= Yehuda Poliker =

Israeli musician and painter (born 1950)

Yehuda Poliker יהודה פוליקר
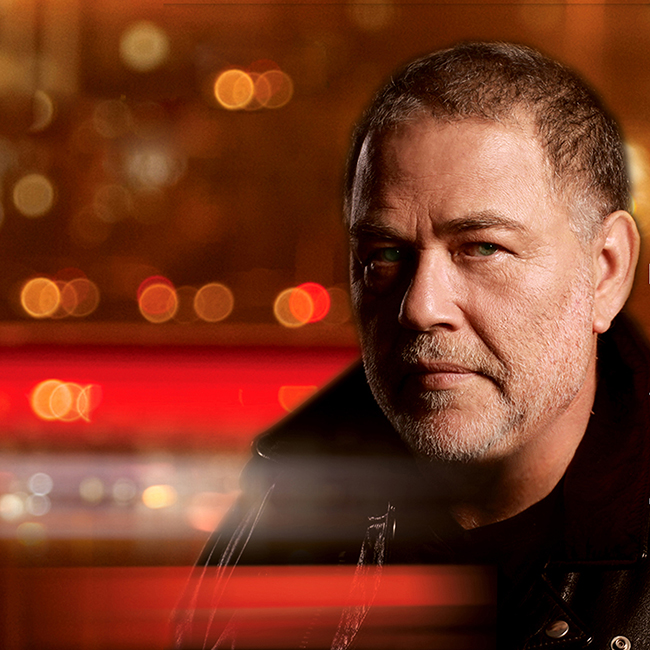
- Poliker in 2014

Background information
- Born: Leonidas Polikaris; 25 December 1950 (age 75); Kiryat Haim, Israel
- Genres: rock; Greek music; Mediterranean music
- Occupations: Musician, songwriter
- Instruments: Vocals, guitar
- Years active: 1980–present
- Formerly of: Benzene

Yehuda Leon Poliker (Hebrew: יהודה ליאון פוליקר; born Leonidas Polikaris; 25 December 1950) is an Israeli singer, songwriter, and musician. Poliker first became known in the 1980s as the lead vocalist for the band Benzene. In 1985, after Benzene broke up, he began a solo career that blended rock, pop, and traditional Greek music.

== Biography ==
=== Early life ===
Poliker was born Leonidas Polikaris in Kiryat Haim, a suburb of Haifa, Israel. His parents were Greek Jews and Holocaust survivors who were deported to Auschwitz from Thessaloniki.

=== Music career ===
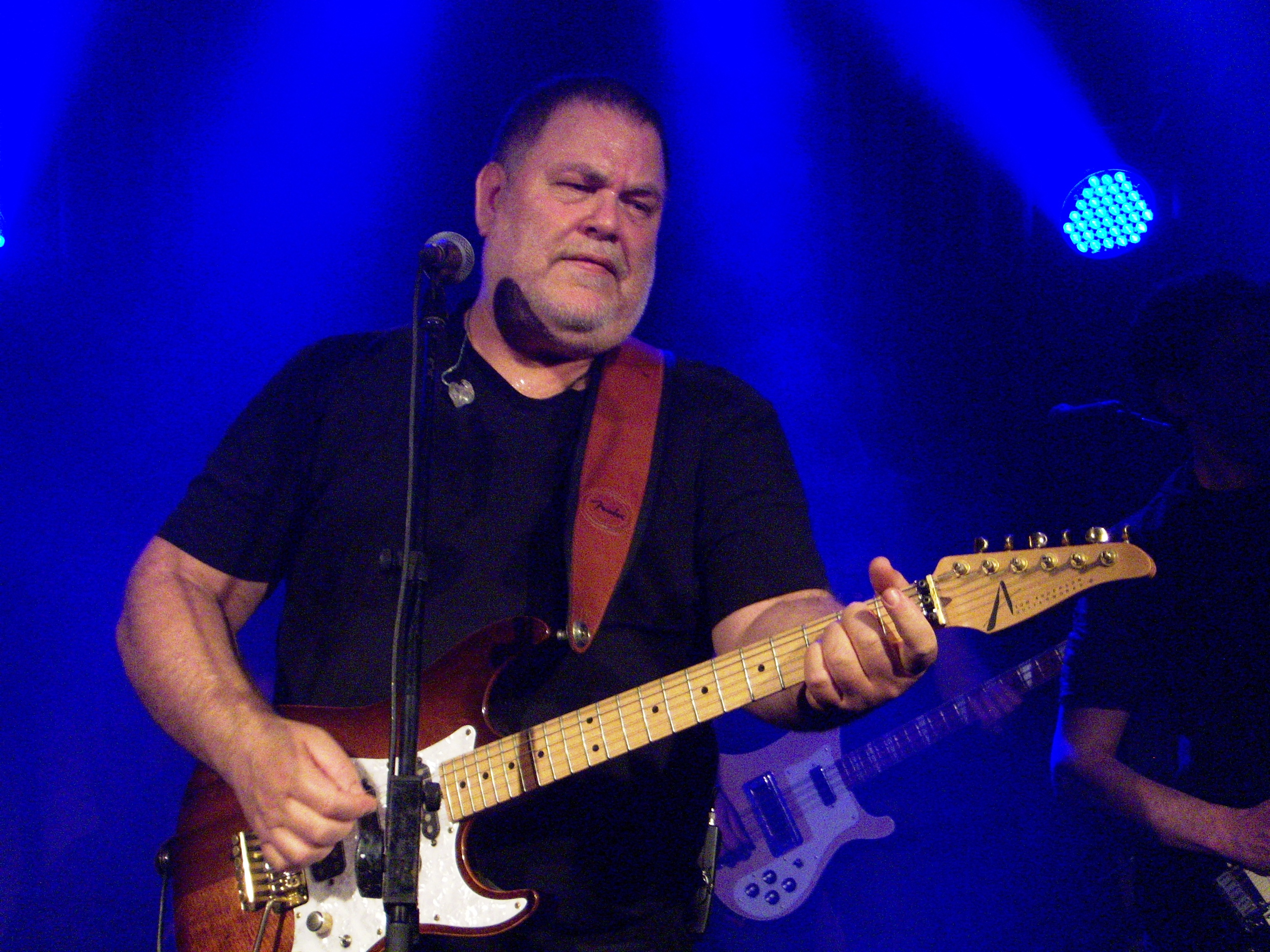
Poliker in Tel Aviv, 2011

1980s

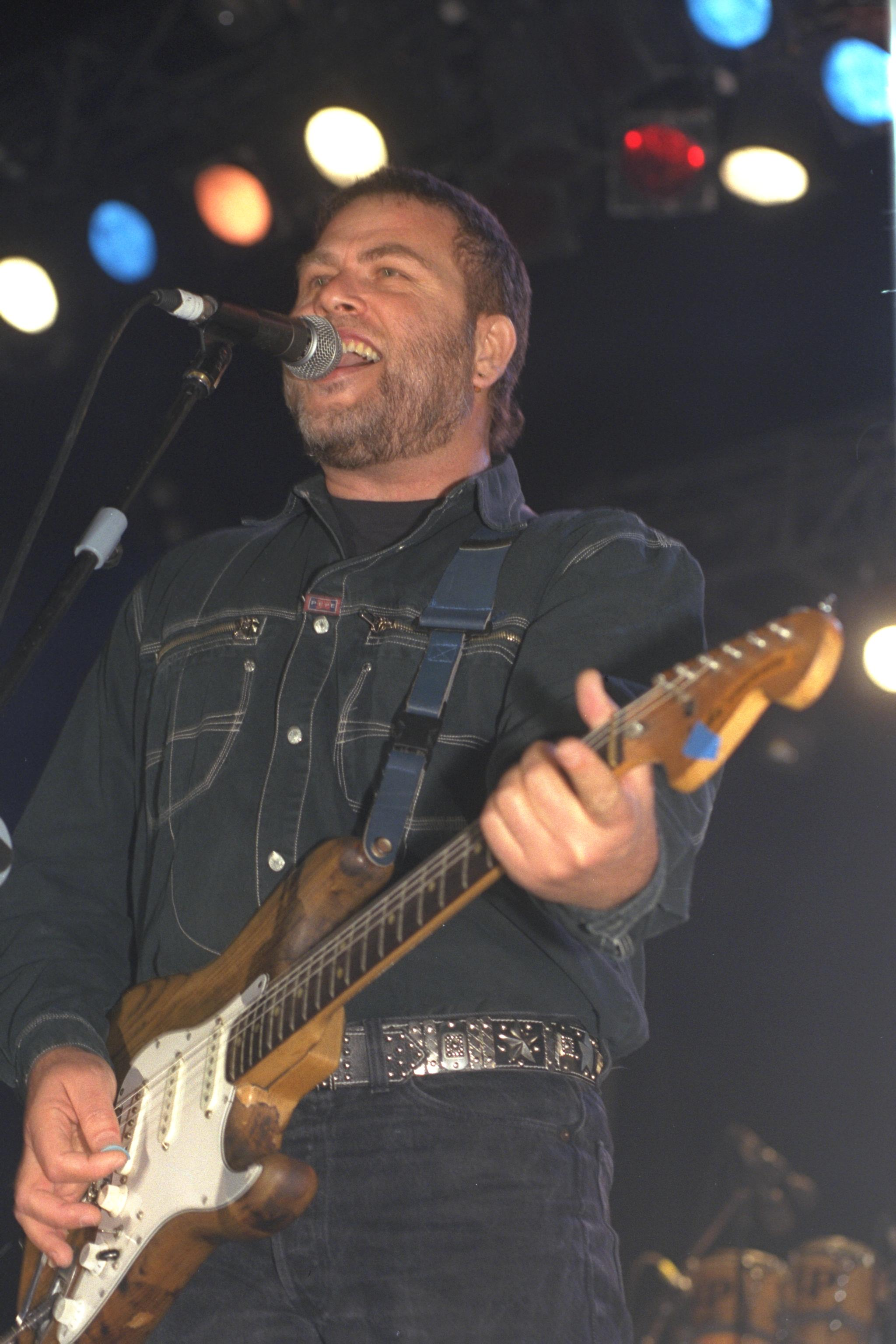
Poliker at Red Sea Jazz Festival in Eilat, 1992

In 1981, Poliker began his career-long collaboration with writer and producer Yaakov Gilad. Poliker's band, Benzene, released two albums: 24 Sha'ot and Mishmeret Layla, which included singles such as "Hofshi Ze Legamrei Levad", "Geshem", and "Yom Shishi". After Benzene broke up, Poliker began a solo career. In 1985, he released his first album, Einayim Sheli. All the tracks were well-known Greek songs translated into Hebrew. In 1986, he released his second solo album, Kholem Behakitz. His third, Efer VeAvak, issued in 1988, dealt mostly with the children of Holocaust survivors. It sold more than 70,000 copies, and in 2005, was rated by Ynet as No. 1 in the top 100 best albums ever recorded in Israel.

1990s

In 1990, Poliker released his fourth studio album, Pakhot Aval Ko'ev. It sold over 140,000 copies, becoming his most successful to date. Poliker subsequently began work on an instrumental record, released in 1992 as Le'enekha Hakekhulot. In 1995, he published a double album, Hayeled Sh'Beha. The ensuing concert tour was documented on the double live album Hofa'a Khaya Bekaysaria.

2000–present

In 2001, Poliker released the album Eih Korim Laahava Sheli? The title song won Song of the Year at the 2002 ACUM Golden Feather Awards. In 2003, he released his first compilation album, Hameitav, which included songs by both Benzene and his solo repertoire, as well as new tracks. In 2007, he released Hummus Sapiens in collaboration with Greek poet Manolis Rasoulis.

In 2010, Poliker began his Shirim Shehilkhanti Le'aherim tour. It featured his first songs for other singers, such as Yossi Banai, Riki Gal, and Arik Einstein. Also in 2010, he released Ahava Al Tnai. The first single, "Shlosha Yamim", reached the top of the Israeli charts. In 2011, he released Kol Davar Mazkir Li, which, like Einaim Sheli, consisted of well-known Greek songs translated into Hebrew. He sang the title track in Greek with Haris Alexiou and also recorded a Hebrew version. Two weeks after its release, the album was certified Gold.

In 2012, Poliker released Jacko and Yehuda Poliker, which contained rare recordings of his parents singing Thessaloniki Jewish songs in Greek and Ladino before World War II. In early 2014, he issued Muzeon Ha Halomot, which featured the guitar and the bouzouki. The album was certified Gold and was soon followed by a tour.

During a 2015 tour marking 40 years since the release of his 1985 debut album, Einayim Sheli, Poliker staged a performance at the Thessaloniki Concert Hall in Saloniki, Greece. It was the artist's first visit to the city from which his parents had been rounded up and deported to the Auschwitz concentration camp.

== Discography ==
Year	Album
1985	My Eyes (Hebrew: עיניים שלי)
1986	Daydreamer (Hebrew: חולם בהקיץ)
1988	Ashes and Dust (Hebrew: אפר ואבק)
1990	Hurts but Less (Hebrew: פחות אבל כואב)
1992	For Your Blue Eyes (Hebrew: לעיניך הכחולות)
1995	The Child Within You (Hebrew: הילד שבך)
1996	Live at Caesaria (Hebrew: הופעה חיה בקיסריה)
1998	Late Maybe It's Early (Hebrew: מאוחר אולי מוקדם)
2001	What Is My Love Called? (Hebrew: איך קוראים לאהבה שלי?)
2003	The Best (Hebrew: המיטב)
2007	Hummus Sapiens (with Manolis Rasoulis) (Hebrew: חומוס ספיינס)
2010	Conditional Love (Hebrew: אהבה על תנאי)
2011	Everything Reminds Me (Hebrew: כל דבר מזכיר לי)
2012	Jacko and Yehuda Poliker (Hebrew: ג'קו ויהודה פוליקר)
2014	Museum of Dreams (Hebrew: מוזיאון החלומות)

== Film ==
Poliker's father, Jacko, told the story of his escape from Auschwitz in the 1988 film Because of That War (Hebrew: B'Glal Hamilhamah Hahi), which featured music by his son. The film included interviews with Yehuda Poliker.

== Book ==
In 2019, Poliker's book My Shadow and I was published by Yedioth Books. It depicts situations and imagery from his childhood and adolescence, from the vantage point of both a child and an adult.

== Awards and recognition ==
In 2012, Poliker won the ACUM Lifetime Achievement Award. In 2014, he received the Gold Cross of the Order of the Phoenix, one of Greece's highest awards for achievement in the arts. It was presented by then-Greek ambassador to Israel, Spyridon Lampridis.

In 2019, Poliker was selected to light a torch on Israel's 71st Independence Day ceremony. In 2025, he was awarded an honorary doctorate by the Hebrew University of Jerusalem, in recognition of his work, Holocaust commemoration, and social involvement, marking the university's 100th anniversary.

== See also ==
- Music of Israel
- Greece-Israel relations
