= List of gay, lesbian or bisexual people: I–J =

This is a partial list of notable people who were or are gay men, lesbian or bisexual.

The historical concept and definition of sexual orientation varies and has changed greatly over time; for example the general term "gay" wasn't used to describe sexual orientation until the mid 20th century. A number of different classification schemes have been used to describe sexual orientation since the mid-19th century, and scholars have often defined the term "sexual orientation" in divergent ways. Indeed, several studies have found that much of the research about sexual orientation has failed to define the term at all, making it difficult to reconcile the results of different studies. However, most definitions include a psychological component (such as the direction of an individual's erotic desire) and/or a behavioural component (which focuses on the sex of the individual's sexual partner/s). Some prefer to simply follow an individual's self-definition or identity.

The high prevalence of people from the West on this list may be due to societal attitudes towards homosexuality. The Pew Research Center's 2013 Global Attitudes Survey found that there is “greater acceptance in more secular and affluent countries,” with "publics in 39 countries [having] broad acceptance of homosexuality in North America, the European Union, and much of Latin America, but equally widespread rejection in predominantly Muslim nations and in Africa, as well as in parts of Asia and in Russia. Opinion about the acceptability of homosexuality is divided in Israel, Poland and Bolivia.” As of 2013, Americans are divided – a majority (60 percent) believes homosexuality should be accepted, while 33 percent disagree.

A · Ba–Bh · Bi–Bz · C · D · E · F · G · H · I · J · K · L · M · N · O
P · Q · R · Sa–Sc · Sd–Si · Sj–Sz · T · U · V · W · X · Y · Z

== I ==
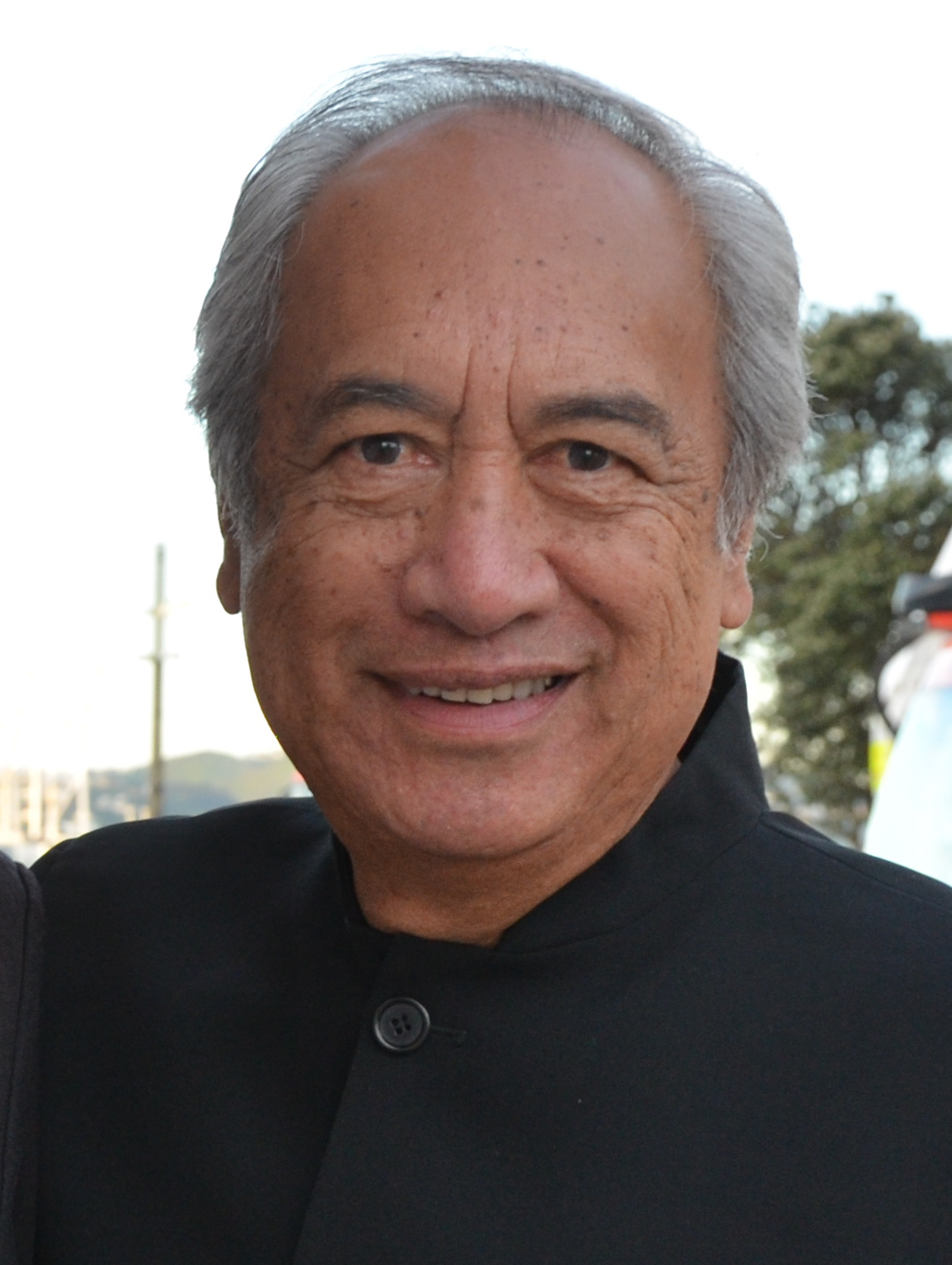
Author Witi Ihimaera

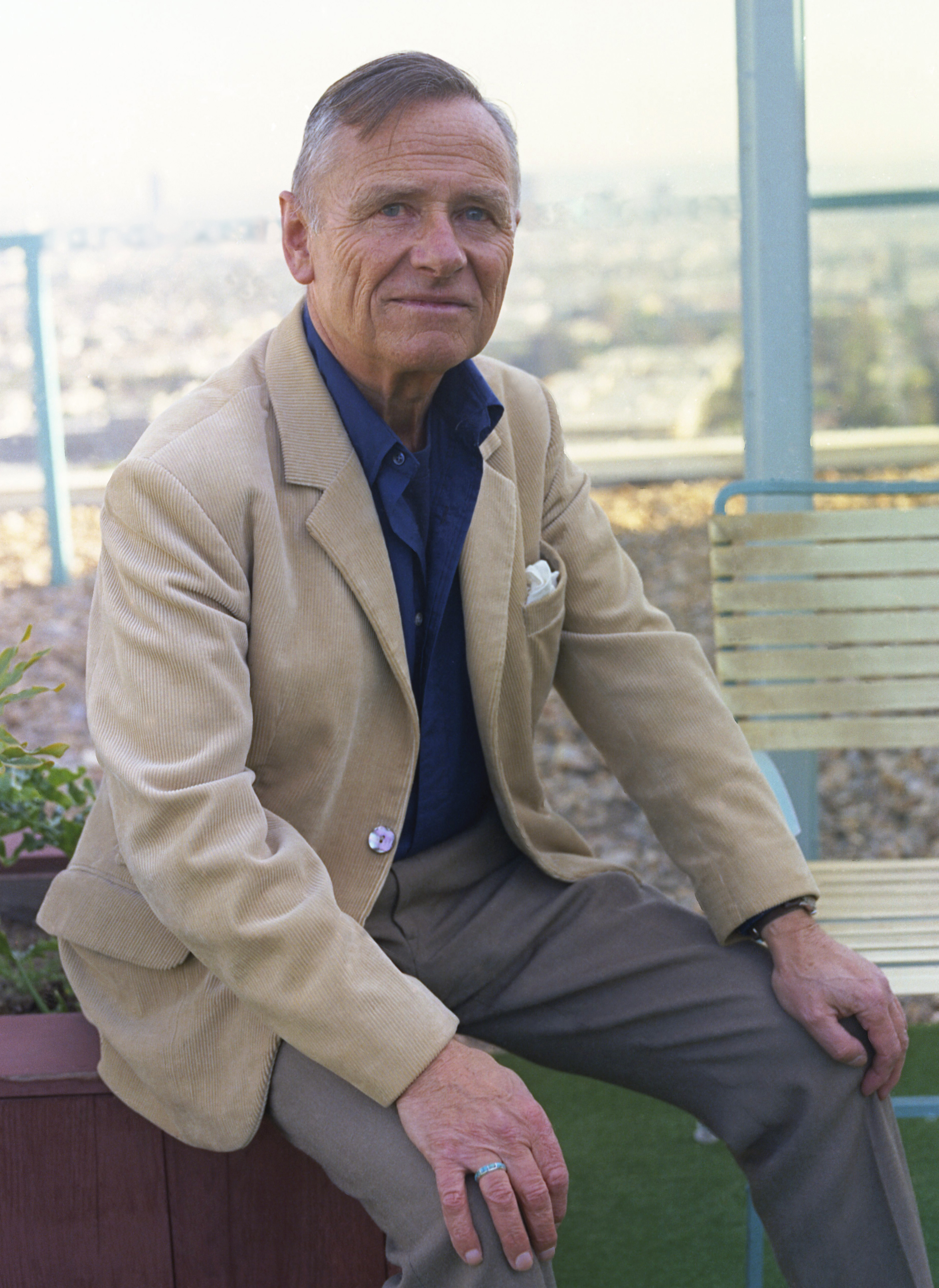
Novelist Christopher Isherwood

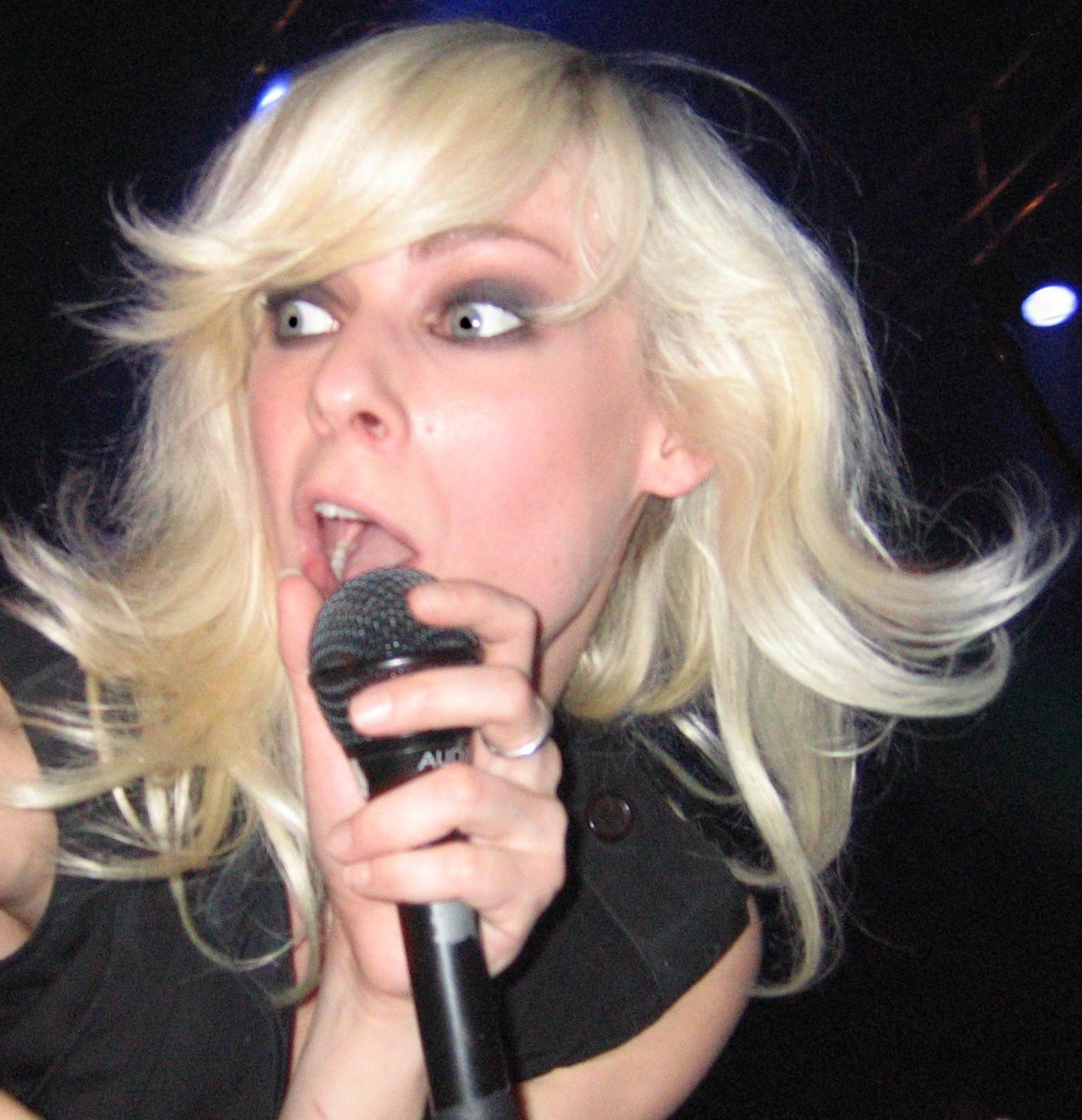
Rock musician Maja Ivarsson

Name	Lifetime	Nationality	Notable as	Notes
Paul Iacono	b. 1988	American	Actor	G
Janis Ian	b. 1951	American	Singer-songwriter	L
Eréndira Ibarra	b. 1985	Mexican	Actor	B
Xandra Ibarra	b. ?	American	Performance artist	L
Chukwuebuka Ibeh	b. 2000	Nigerian	Writer	G
Miquel Iceta	b. 1960	Spanish	Politician	G
Youssef Idilbi	1976–2008	Dutch	Actor	G
Marleen van Iersel	b. 1988	Dutch	Volleyball player	L
Eloy de la Iglesia	1944–2006	Spanish	Screenwriter, film director	G
Arnell Ignacio	b. 1964	Filipino	TV personality, actor, singer	B
Witi Ihimaera	b. 1944	New Zealand	Author	G
Allison Ikley-Freeman	b. ?	American	Politician	L
Ioannis Ikonomou	b. 1964	Greek	Translator for the EU	G
Nnanna Ikpo	b. ?	Nigerian	Novelist	G
Elton Ilirjani	b. 1980	Albanian–American	Fashionist, businessman	G
Pablo Illanes	b. 1973	Chilean	Writer, journalist, film director	G
iLoveMakonnen	b. 1989	American	Rapper, singer	G
Silvana Imam	b. 1986	Lithuanian-Swedish	Rapper	L
Blair Imani	b. 1993	American	African-American and Muslim activist, writer	L
Connie Imboden	b. 1953	American	Photographer	L
Per Imerslund	1912–1943	Norwegian	Nazi soldier, writer	G
Facundo Imhoff	b. 1989	Argentine	Volleyball player	G
Mark Indelicato	b. 1994	American	Actor	G
Gary Indiana	1950–2024	American	Writer, actor, artist, cultural critic	G
Rita Indiana	b. 1977	Dominican	Author, singer-songwriter	L
Alvin Ing	1932–2021	American	Singer, actor	G
William Inge	1913–1973	American	Playwright, novelist	G
John Inman	1935–2007	English	Actor	G
Vera Int-Veen	b. 1967	German	TV presenter and producer	L
Willoughby Ions	1881–1977	American	Dramatist	L
Cemil İpekçi	b. 1948	Turkish	Fashion designer	G
Daniela Iraschko-Stolz	b. 1983	Austrian	Ski jumper	L
Percy Irausquin	1969–2008	Aruban-Dutch	Fashion designer	G
Samantha Irby	b. 1980	American	Comedian, author	B
Doug Ireland	b. 1946	American	Journalist, blogger	G
Evelyn Irons	1900–2000	Scottish	Journalist	L
Daniel K. Isaac	b. 1988	American	Actor	G
Rachel Isaacs	b. ?	American	1st openly lesbian rabbi ordained by the Conservative movement's Jewish Theological Seminary	L
Håkan Isacson	1958–2002	Swedish	Intelligence agent	G
Richard Isay	b. 1934	American	Author, psychiatrist	G
Sharon Isbin	b. 1956	American	Classical musician	L
Taiga Ishikawa	b. 1974	Japanese	Politician, activist	G
Wataru Ishizaka	b. 1976	Japanese	Politician, LGBT rights activist	G
Tania Israel	b. 1966	American	Psychologist, professor	B
Sam Irvin	b. 1956	American	Director	G
Elisabeth Irwin	1880–1942	American	Educator, psychologist, reformer	L
Christopher Isherwood	1904–1986	English	Author	G
Arturo Islas	1938–1991	American	Academic	G
Tari Ito	1951–2021	Japanese	Performance artist, activist	L
Maja Ivarsson	b. 1979	Swedish	Rock musician (The Sounds)	B
George Cecil Ives	1867–1950	English	Poet, writer, penal reformer, gay rights campaigner	G
Rurik Ivnev	1891–1981	Russian	Poet, translator	G
James Ivory	b. 1928	American	Filmmaker	G
Jarosław Iwaszkiewicz	1894–1980	Polish	Poet, writer	B
Harish Iyer	b. 1979	Indian	Activist	G
Boris Izaguirre	b. 1965	Venezuelan	Writer	G

A · Ba–Bh · Bi–Bz · C · D · E · F · G · H · I · J · K · L · M · N · O
P · Q · R · Sa–Sc · Sd–Si · Sj–Sz · T · U · V · W · X · Y · Z

== J ==
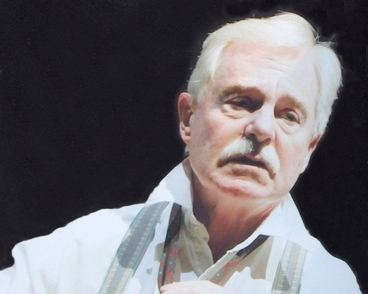
Actor and theatre director Derek Jacobi

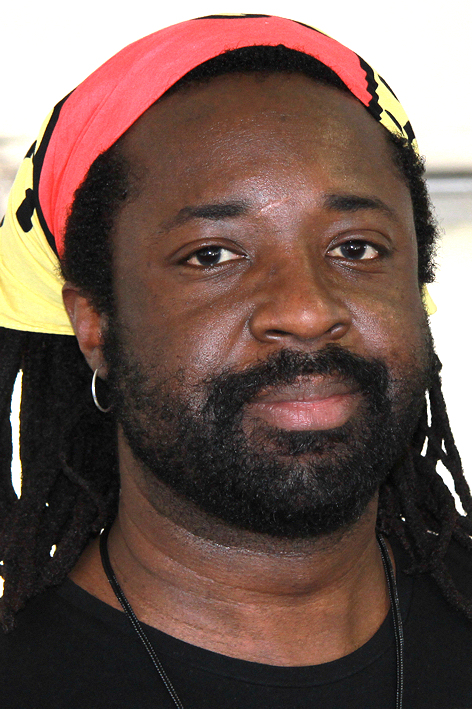
Author Marlon James

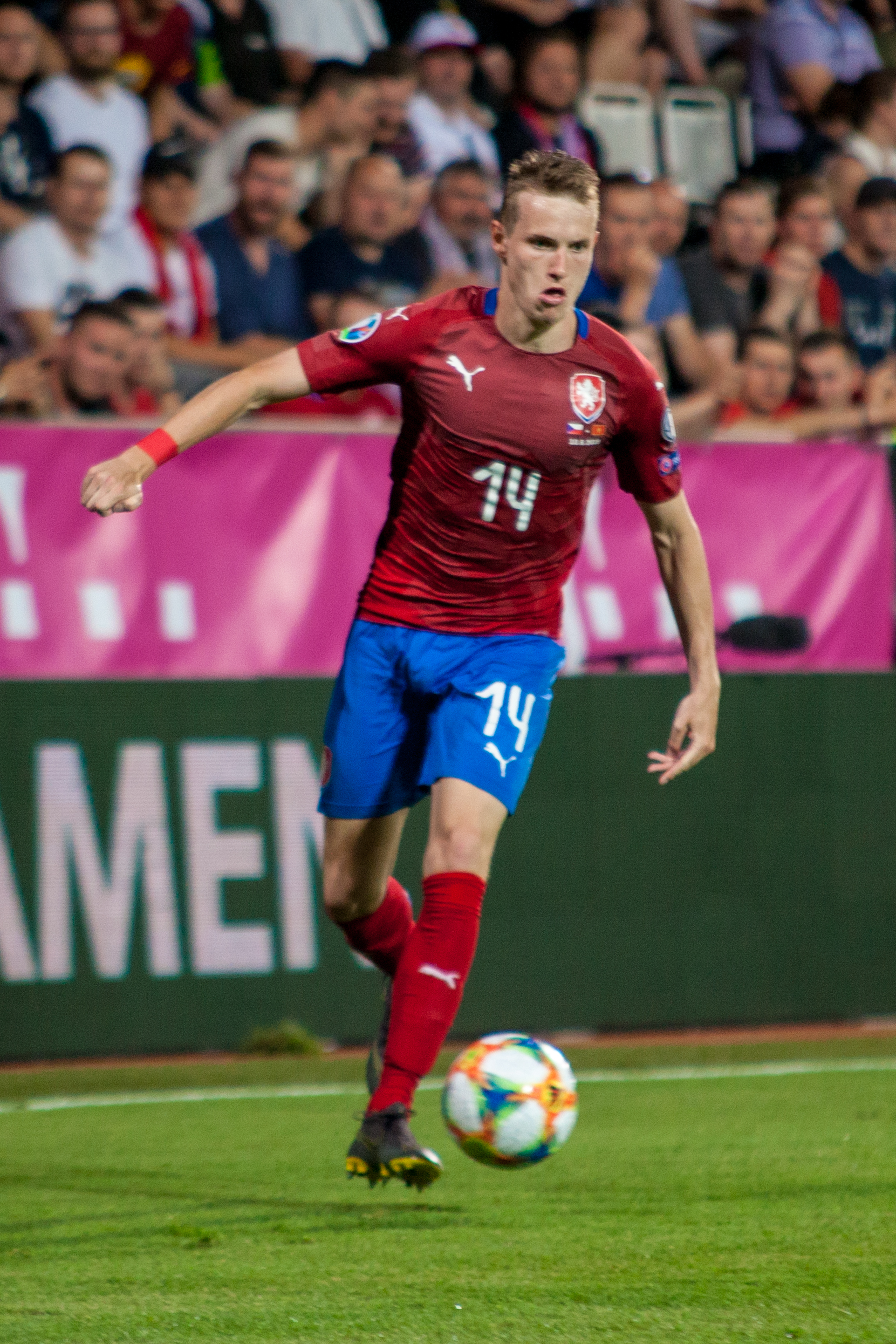
Footballer Jakub Jankto

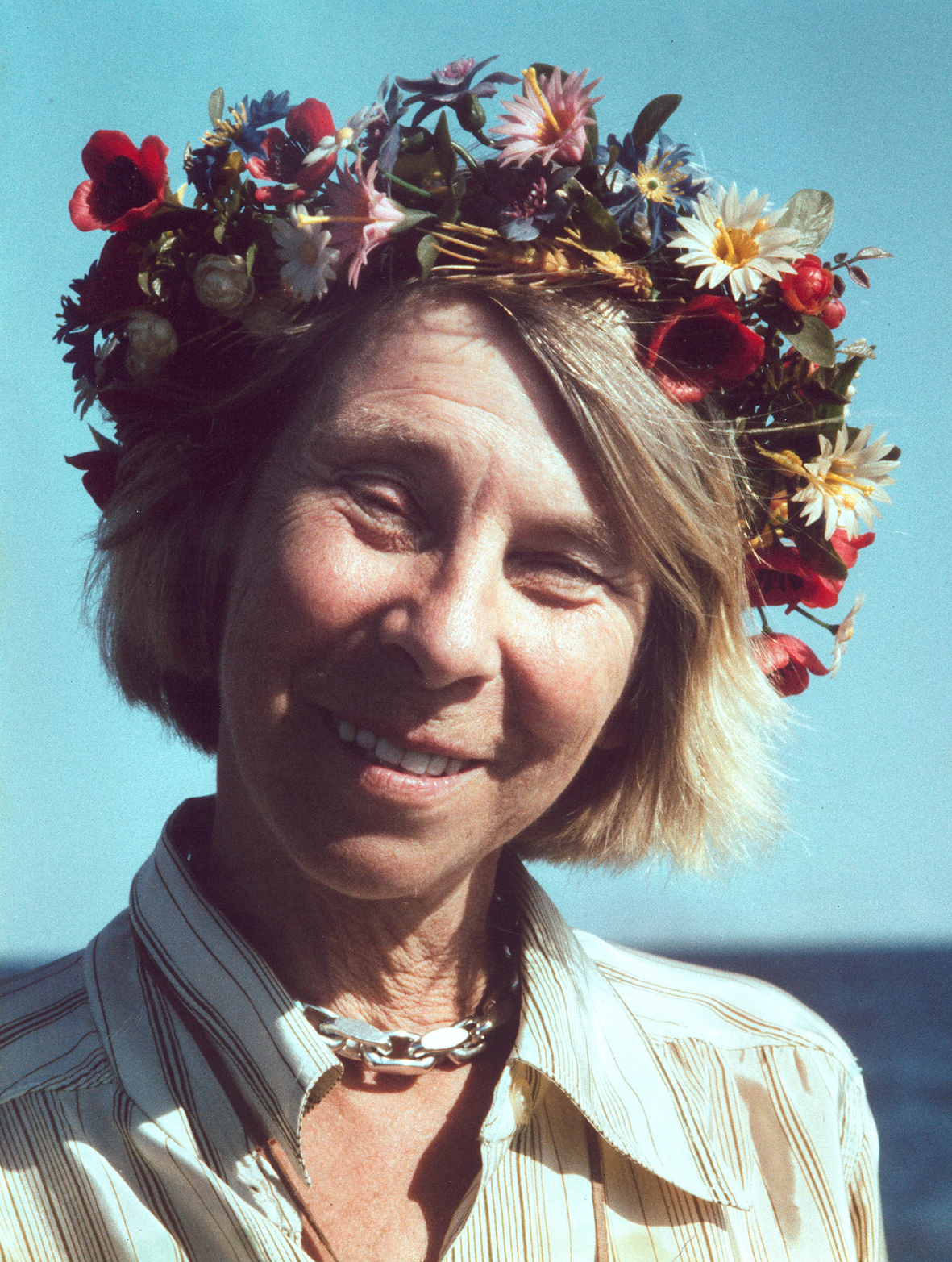
Writer and illustrator Tove Jansson

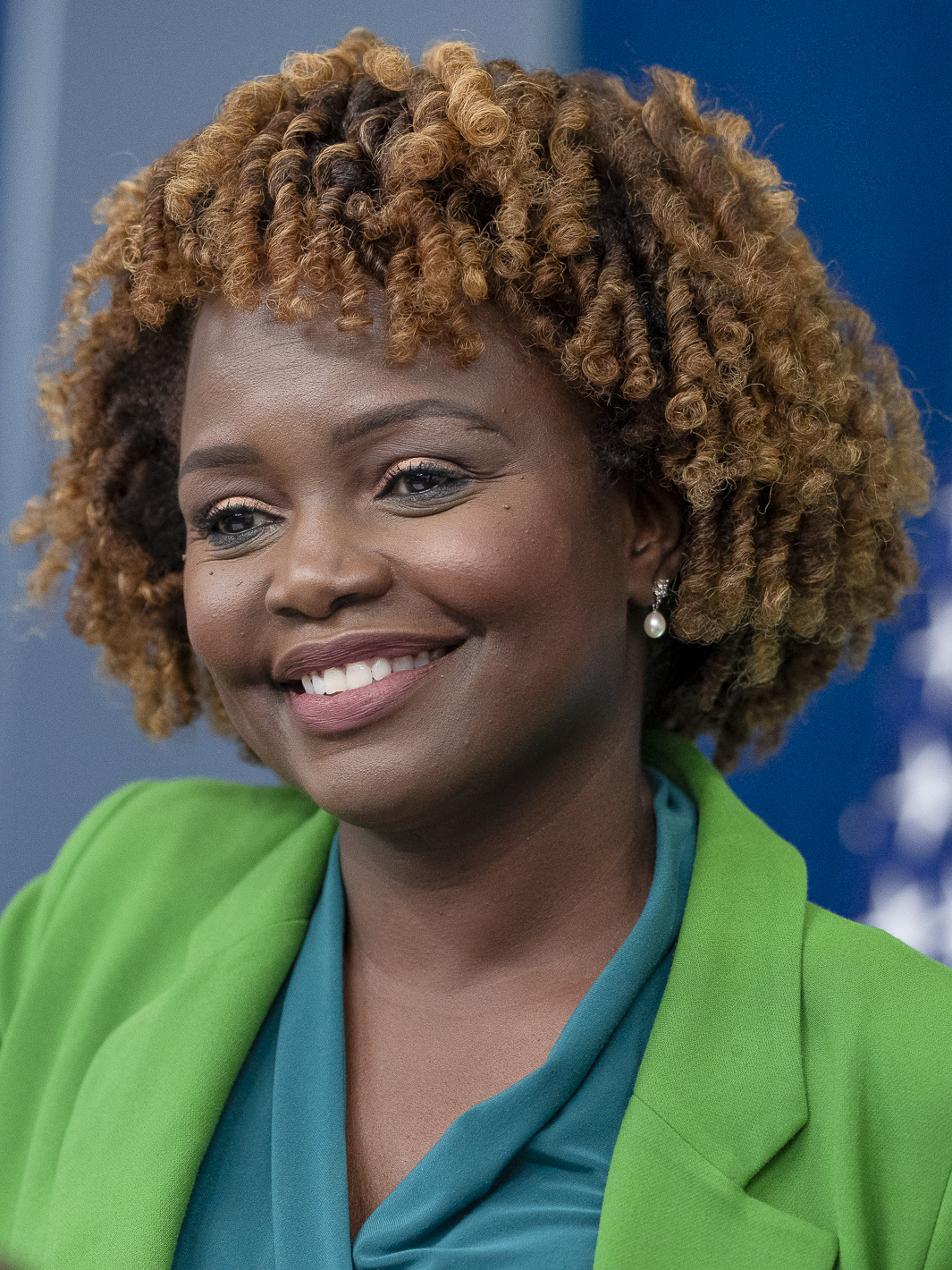
Political advisor and White House press secretary Karine Jean-Pierre

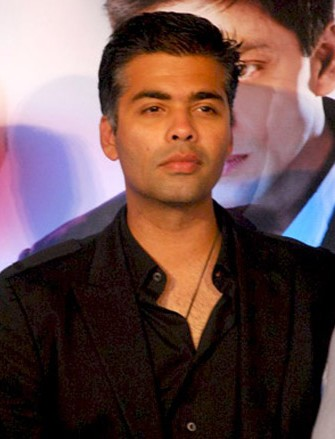
Film direcror Karan Johar

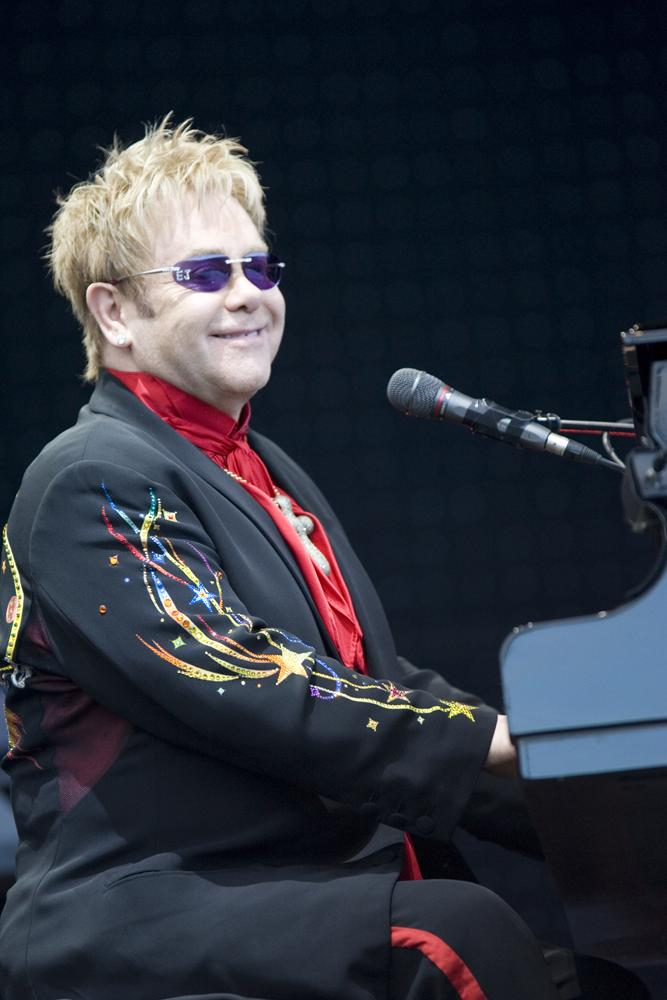
Musician Elton John

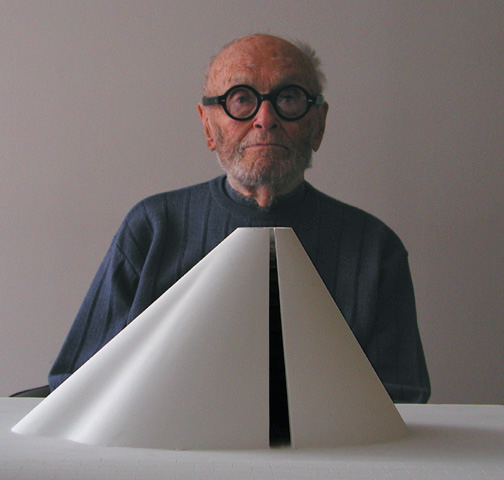
Architect Philip Johnson

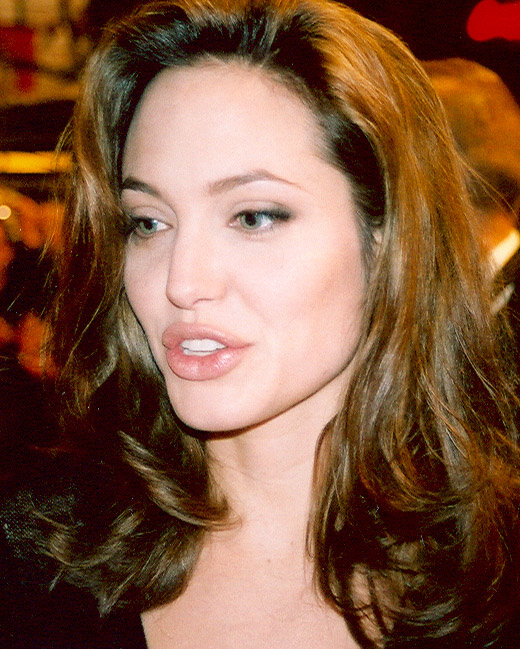
Actress Angelina Jolie

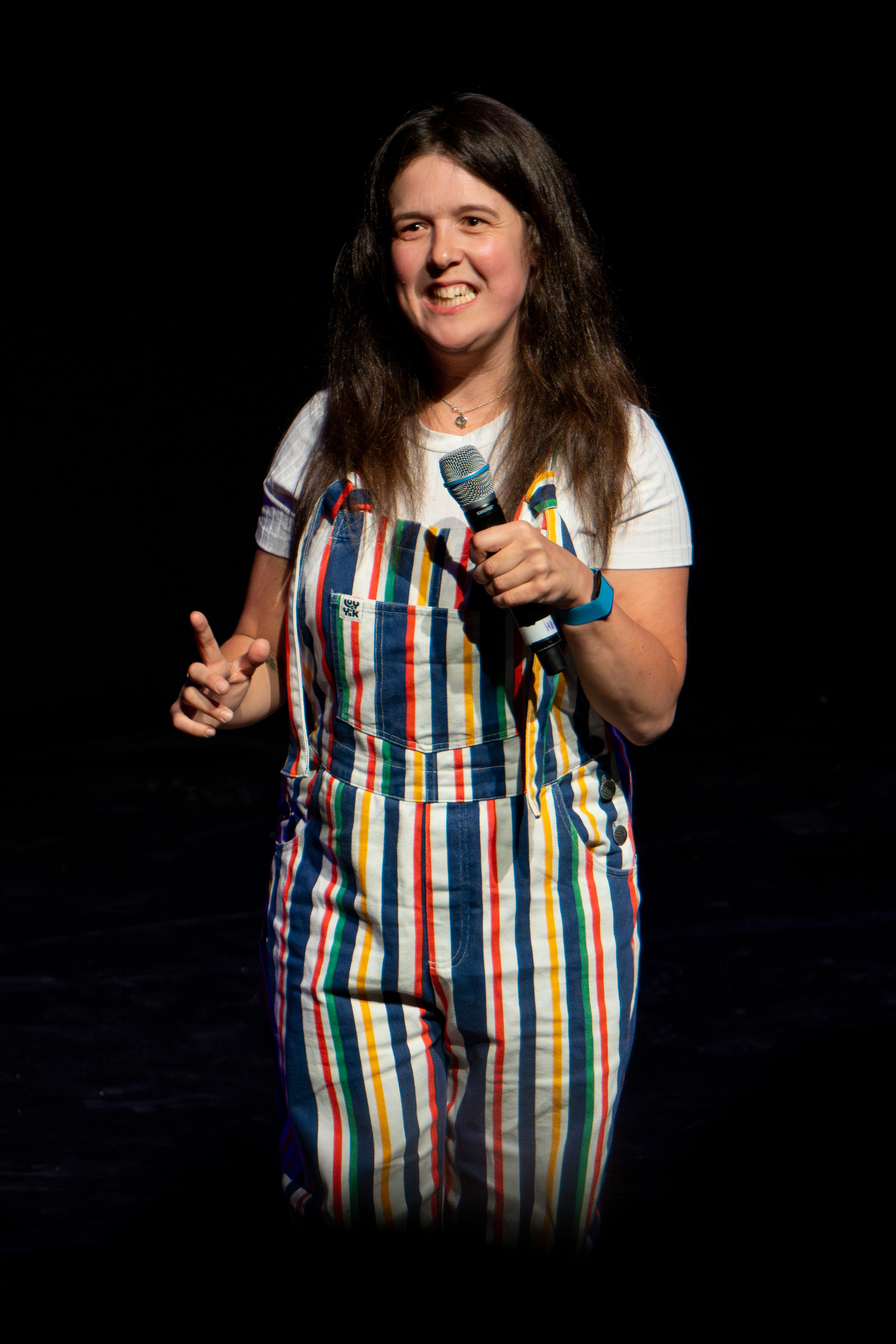
Comedian Rosie Jones

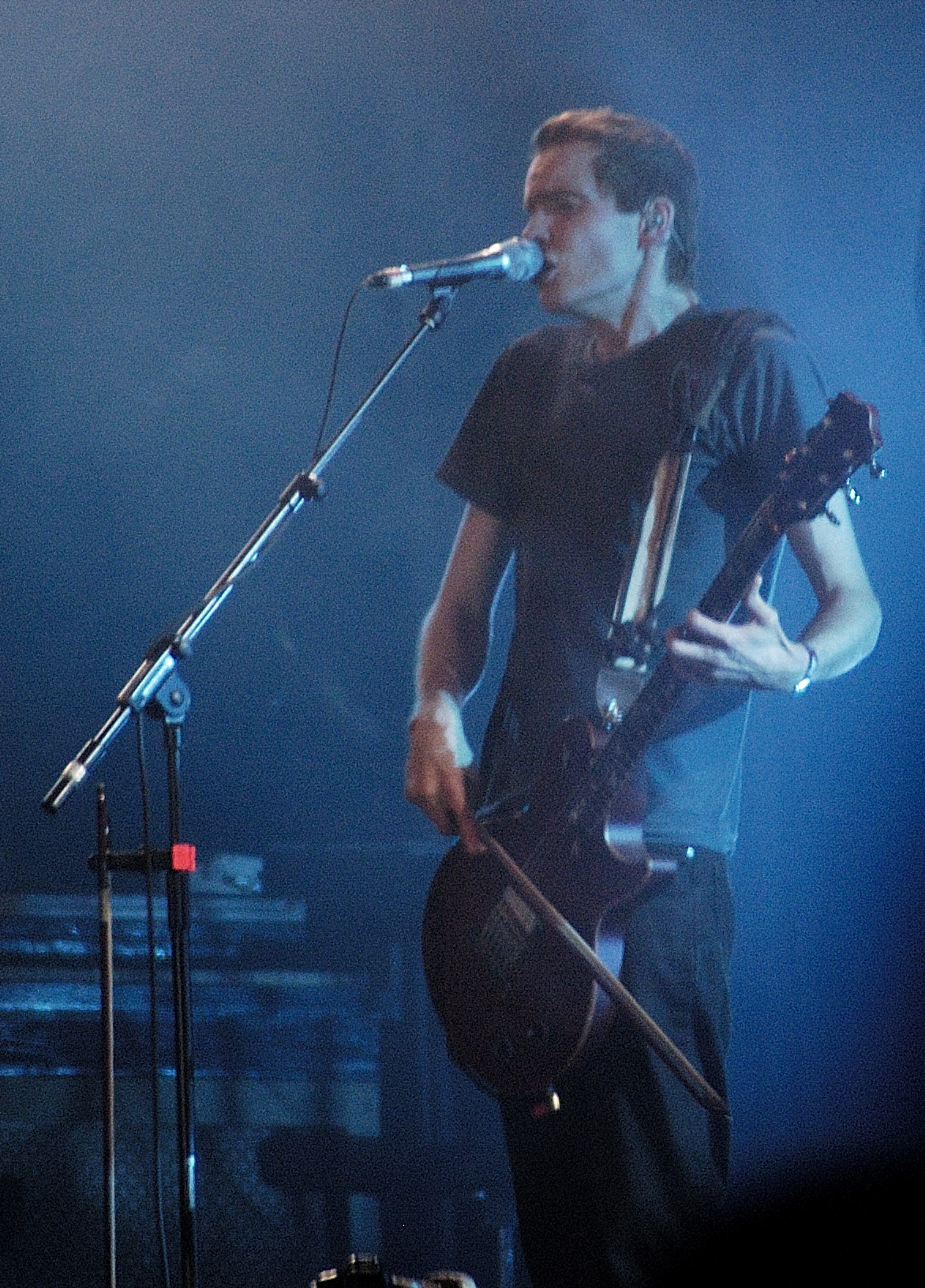
Rock musician Jónsi

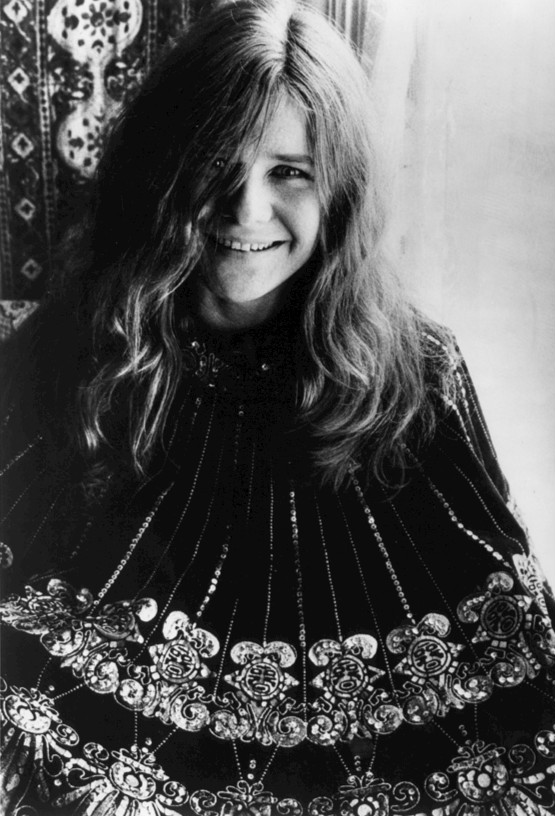
Singer-songwriter Janis Joplin

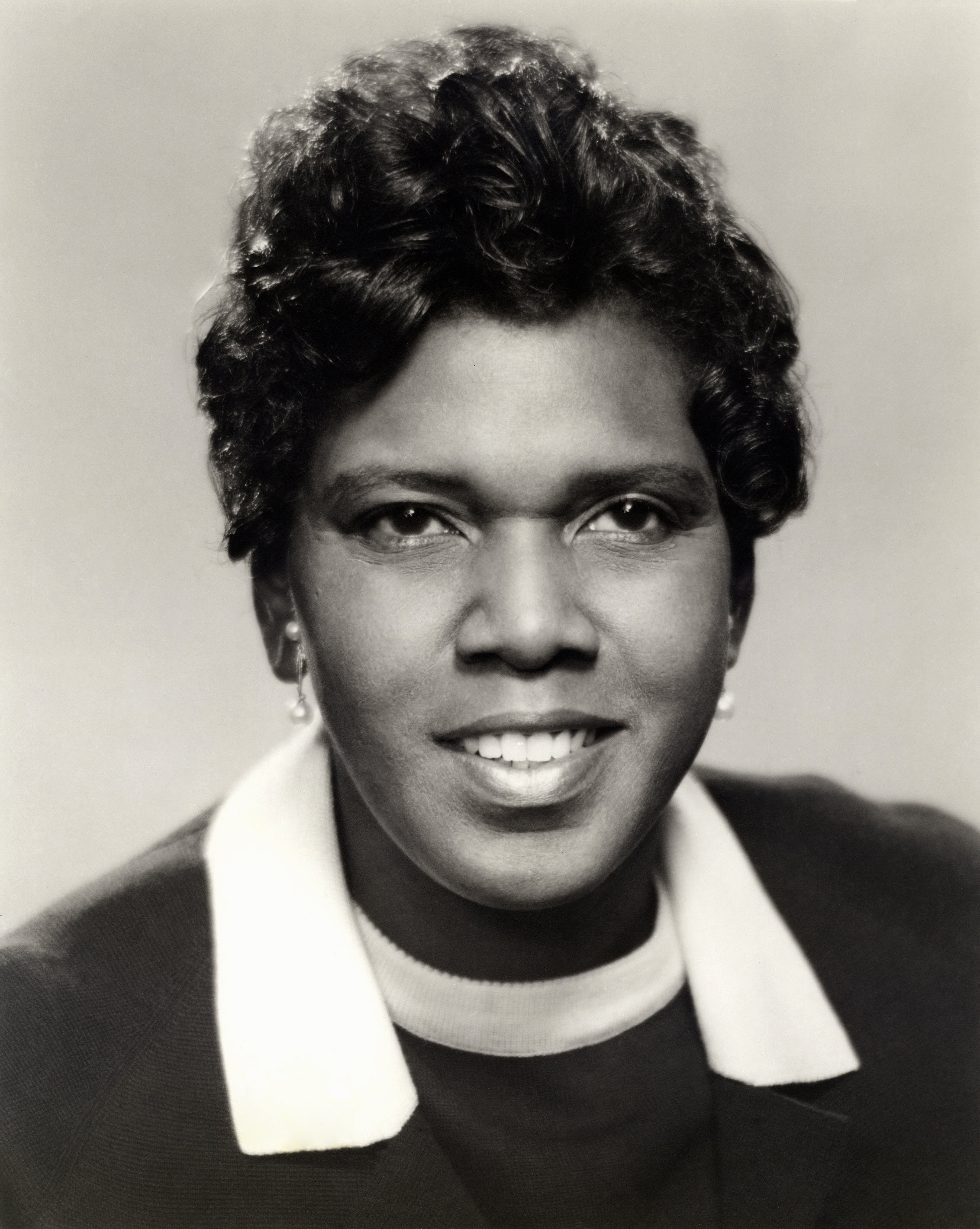
Politician, activist and lawyer Barbara Jordan

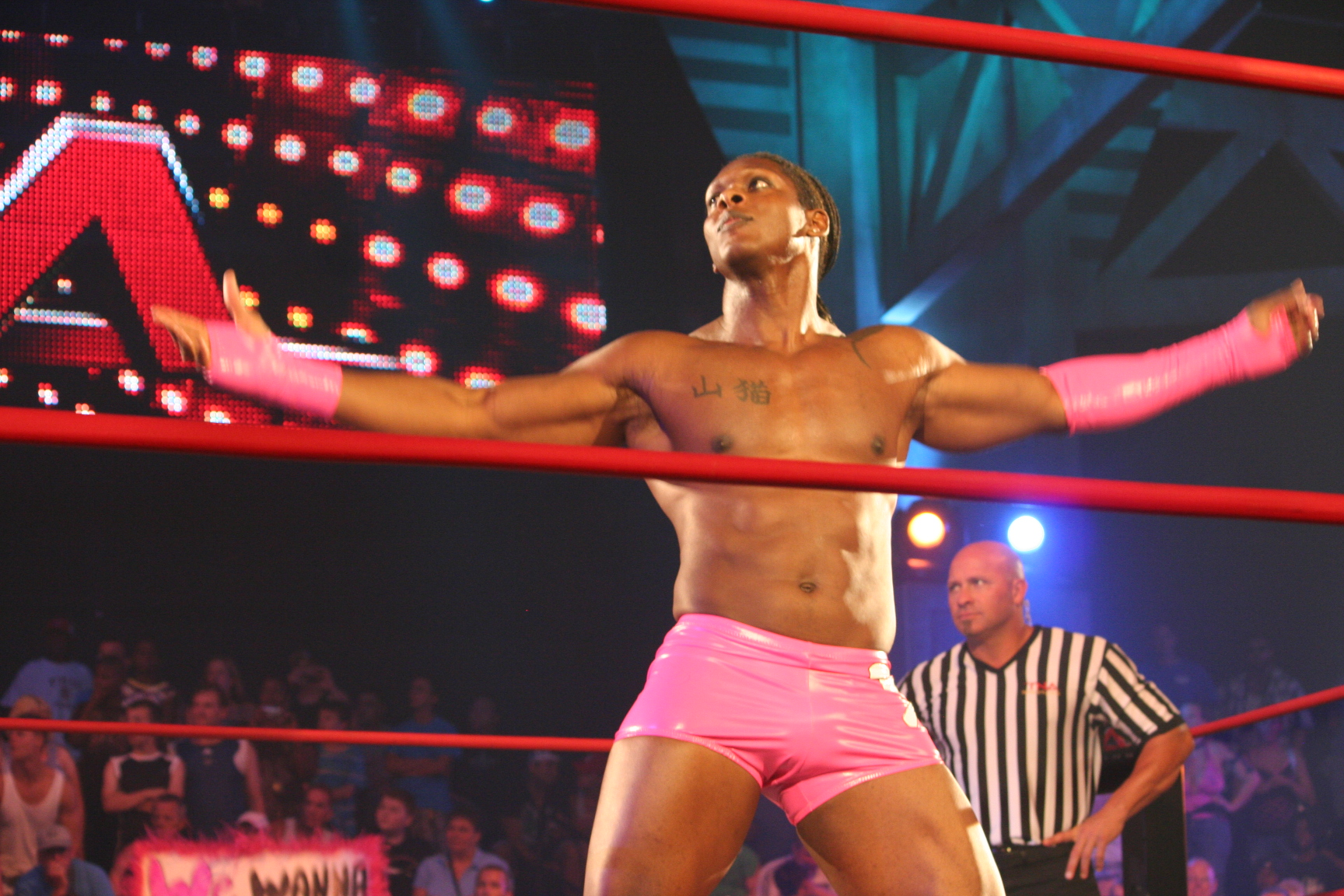
Professional wrestler Orlando Jones

Name	Lifetime	Nationality	Notable as	Notes
Paul Jabara	1948–1992	American	Actor, singer-songwriter	G
Harold Jackman	1901–1961	British-American	Teacher, model, patron of the arts	G
Brian Keith Jackson	b. 1968	American	Writer	G
Cheyenne Jackson	b. 1975	American	Actor	G
Colin Jackson	b. 1967	Welsh	Sprinter, hurdler	G
Jack Jackson Jr.	b. ?	American	Politician	G
Joe Jackson	b. 1954	English	Singer-songwriter, musician	B
Michael R. Jackson	b. ?	American	Playwright, lyricist and composer	G
Paris Jackson	b. 1998	American	Actor, daughter of Michael Jackson	B
Tony Jackson	1882–1921	American	Pianist, singer, composer	G
Max Jacob	1876–1944	French	Poet, painter, writer, critic	G
Derek Jacobi	b. 1938	English	Actor, director	G
Helen Jacobs	1908–1997	American	Professional tennis player	L
Marc Jacobs	b. 1963	American	Fashion designer	G
Abbi Jacobson	b. 1984	American	Film actor	B
Louisa Jacobson	b. 1991	American	Model, actor	L
Peter Marc Jacobson	b. 1957	American	Actor, director	G
Simon Porte Jacquemus	b. 1990	French	Fashion designer	G
Cheryl Jacques	b. 1962	American	Politician, LGBT rights activist	L
Louis Jacquinot	1898–1993	French	Politician, lawyer	G
Felix Jaehn	b. 1994	German	DJ, record producer	B
Michal Jagelka	b. 1977	Czech	Actor	G
Nico de Jager	b. ?	South African	Politician	G
Hans Henny Jahnn	1894–1959	German	Playwright, novelist	B
Sabrina Jalees	b. 1985	Canadian	Comedian	L
Afdhere Jama	b. 1978	Somalian	Writer	G
Paco Jamandreu	1925–1995	Argentine	Fashion designer, actor	G
Aiden James	b. 1982	American	Singer-songwriter	G
Duncan James	b. 1978	English	Singer-songwriter (Blue)	B
G. Winston James	b. ?	American	Poet, essayist, editor, activist	G
Jeremy James	b. 1978	American	Singer-songwriter	G
Kevin James	b. 1963	American	Broadcaster, politician, former Assistant U.S. Attorney	G
Margot James	b. 1958	English	Politician, entrepreneur	L
Marlon James	b. 1970	Jamaican	Writer	G
Parson James	b. 1994	American	Singer-songwriter	G
Ryland James	b. 1999	Canadian	Singer-songwriter	Q
Sylvester James	1948–1988	American	Singer	G
Piroska Jancsó-Ladányi	1934–1954	Hungarian	Serial killer	L
Gary Janetti	b. 1966	American	TV writer and producer	G
Crystal Jang	b. ?	American	LGBT activist	L
Jang Yeong-jin	b. 1957/1958	Korean	Writer, North Korean defector	G
Claude Janiak	b. 1948	Swiss	Politician	
Maria Janion	1926–2020	Polish	Scholar, critic, literary theoretician, politician	L
Jakub Jankto	b. 1996	Czech	Footballer	G
Tove Jansson	1914–2001	Finnish	Author	L
Arthur Japin	b. 1956	Dutch	Novelist	G
Derek Jarman	1942–1994	English	Film director	G
Aleksandra Jarmolińska	b. 1990	Polish	Sports shooter	L
Alfred Jarry	1873–1907	French	Playwright	G
Jason and deMarco (band)	b. 1975/1976	American	Christian musical duo	G
Carlos Jáuregui	1957–1996	Argentine	LGBT rights activist, founder of La Comunidad Homosexual Argentina, brother of Roberto Jáuregui	G
Lauren Jauregui	b. 1996	American	Pop singer (Fifth Harmony)	B
Roberto Jáuregui	1960–1994	Argentine	Journalist, actor, human rights activist, brother of Carlos Jáuregui	G
Karla Jay	b. 1947	American	Professor, LGBT rights activist	L
Sam Jay	b. 1982	American	Writer, comedian	L
Lorri Jean	b. ?	American	LGBT rights activist	L
Karine Jean-Pierre	b. 1974	Haitian-American	Political campaign organizer, activist, political commentator, and author who served as White House Deputy Press Secretary from 2021 to 2022 and as White House Press Secretary from 2022 to 2025	L
Alex Jeffers	b. ?	American	Writer	G
Patrick Jeffrey	b. 1965	American	Diver	G
Mike Jeffries	b. 1944	American	Businessman	G
Konstanty Jeleński	1922–1987	Polish	Writer	G
Martin Jenkins	b. 1953	American	1st openly gay Justice of the California Supreme Court	G
Max Jenkins	b. 1985	American	Actor, writer	G
Roy Jenkins	1920–2003	Welsh	Politician, historian, writer	B
Walter Jenkins	1918–1985	American	Special assistant to U.S. President Lyndon B. Johnson	B
Dale Jennings	1917–2000	American	LGBT rights activist, playwright, author	G
Drake Jensen	b. 1970	Canadian	country singer-songwriter	G
Hayley Jensen	b. 1992	New Zealand	Cricketer	L
Jeong Yol	b. 1976	South Korean	LGBT and Human Rights activist	G
Daniel Jervis	b. 1996	Welsh	Swimmer	G
Christian Jessen	b. 1977	English	Physician, TV presenter	G.
Jessie J	b. 1988	English	Singer-songwriter	B
Connor Jessup	b. 1994	Canadian	Actor, writer, director	G
Robin de Jesús	b. 1984	American	Actor	G
Michael Jeter	1952–2003	American	Actor	G
Charlot Jeudy	1984–2019	Haitian	LGBT rights activist	G
Geri Jewell	b. 1956	American	Comedian, actor	L
Sarah Orne Jewett	1849–1909	American	Author	L
Sophia Jex-Blake	1840–1912	English	Physician, suffragette	L
Barbara Jezeršek	b. 1986	Slovenian	Skier	L
Patria Jiménez	b. 1957	Mexican	Politician, first openly lesbian member of the Congress of Mexico	L
Phil Jimenez	b. 1970	American	Comic artist	G
Emperor Jing of Han	188–141 BC	Chinese (Han Dynasty)	Head of state	B
Laurie Jinkins	b. ?	American	Politician	L
Napolean Jinnies	b. ?	American	One of the first male National Football League (NFL) cheerleaders to perform during the Super Bowl	G
Peter Jöback	b. 1971	Swedish	Singer	G
Jobriath	1946–1983	American	Rock musician	G
Percy Jocelyn	1764–1842	Irish	Anglican Bishop of Clogher	G
Sonja Jógvansdóttir	b. 1977	Faroese	Journalist, establisher and coordinator of SAMTAK	L
Klara Johanson	1875–1948	Swedish	Journalist	L
Karan Johar	b. 1972	Indian	Actor, film director, screenwriter, TV personality	G
Navtej Johar	b. 1959	Indian	Choreographer	G
Edmund John	1883–1917	English	Uranian poet	G
Elton John	b. 1947	English	Pop singer, musician	G
Gwen John	1876–1939	Welsh	Painter	B
Jeffrey John	b. 1953	English	Anglican priest	G
Jasper Johns	b. 1930	American	Artist	G
Christine Johnson	b. 1968	American	Politician	L
Craig Johnson	b. ?	American	Film director, screenwriter	G
Darren Johnson	b. 1966	English	Politician	G
Dean Johnson	1961–2007	American	Musician, party promoter	G
Deon K. Johnson	b. ?	Barbadian-American	XI Bishop of Missouri	G
E. Patrick Johnson	b. 1967	American	Academic	G
Fenton Johnson	b. 1954	American	Author	G
Glory Johnson	b. 1990	American	Basketball player	L
Holly Johnson	b. 1960	English	Pop singer (Frankie Goes to Hollywood)	G
Jay Armstrong Johnson	b. 1987	American	Actor, singer, dancer	G
Jed Johnson	1948–1996	American	Interior designer, film director	G
Joanna Johnson	b. 1961	American	Actor	L
Ken "Snakehips" Johnson	1914–1941	Guyanese-British	Jazz band leader, dancer	G
Lionel Johnson	1867–1902	English	Poet	G
Liz Johnson	b. 1974	American	Ten-pin bowler	L
My-King Johnson	b. ?	American	Football player	G
Philip Johnson	1906–2005	American	Architect	G
Punkie Johnson	b. 1985	American	Actress, comedian	L
Sam Johnson	b. 1989	New Zealand	Social entrepreneurship, activist	G
Scott Johnson	1961–1988	American	PhD student who was killed in a homophobic attack	G
Sonia Johnson	b. 1936	American	Feminist activist, writer	L
Van Johnson	1916–2008	American	Actor, dancer	G
William R. Johnson	b.1946	American	First openly gay minister to be ordained in a historic protestant denomination	G
Frances Benjamin Johnston	1864–1952	American	Photographer	L
Gus Johnston	b. 1979	Australian	Creative director, filmmaker, LGBT activist, field hockey player	G
Jill Johnston	1929–2010	American	Feminist author, cultural critic	L
Lyndon Johnston	b. 1961	Canadian	Figure skater	G
Michael Johnston	b. 1996	American	Actor	G
Campbell Johnstone	b. 1980	New Zealand	Rugby player	G
Angelina Jolie	b. 1975	American	Actor	B
Gerard Joling	b. 1960	Dutch	Pop singer	G
Jess Jonassen	b. 1992	Australian	Cricketer	L
Adam Garnet Jones	b. 1982/83	Canadian	Filmmaker, screenwriter	G
Aled Haydn Jones	b. 1976	Welsh	Radio DJ	G
Allison Jones	b. 1984	American	Paralympic skier, cyclist	L
Bill T. Jones	b. 1952	American	Dancer, choreographer	G
Brandon Scott Jones	b. ?	American	Actor, writer	G
Cherry Jones	b. 1956	American	Actor	L
Cleve Jones	b. 1954	American	Activist	G
Dot-Marie Jones	b. 1964	American	Shot putter, arm wrestler, actor	L
G. B. Jones	b. 1965	Canadian	Artist, filmmaker	B
Gina Ortiz Jones	b. 1981	American	Intelligence officer, politician	L
Ignatius Jones	b. 1957	Filipino-Australian	Singer (Jimmy and the Boys, Pardon Me Boys), contortionist, actor, events director	B
Jason Jones	b. 1964	Trinidadian and Tobagonian	LGBT activist	G
Jim Jones	1931–1978	American	Cult leader	B
Jolanda Jones	b. 1965	American	Attorney, TV personality, politician, heptathlete	L
Megan Jones	b. 1996	Welsh	Rugby player	L
Owen Jones	b. 1984	English	Columnist, political commentator, writer, activist	G
Rahne Jones	b. 1987	American	Actor	L
Randy Jones	b. 1952	American	Pop singer (Village People)	G
Robert Jones	b. ?	British	Writer, figure skating popularizer	G
Rosie Jones	b. 1959	American	Golfer	L
Rosie Jones	b. 1990	English	Comedian, actress	L
Saeed Jones	b. 1985	American	Poet	G
Sarah Jones	b. 1990	Welsh	Field hockey player	L
Shevrin D. Jones	b. 1983	American	Politician, teacher; 1st openly gay African-American legislator in Florida	G
Steffi Jones	b. 1972	German	Footballer, manager	L
Venton Jones	b. ?	American	Politician	G
Jocelyn Jones-Lybarger	b. 1985	American	Mixed martial arts fighter	L
Jónsi	b. 1975	Icelandic	Rock musician (Sigur Rós, Jónsi & Alex)	G
Dennis de Jong	b. 1955	Dutch	Politician	G
Wolfgang Joop	b. 1944	German	Fashion designer	B
Janis Joplin	1943–1970	American	Singer	B
Barbara Jordan	1936–1996	American	U.S. Representative from Texas	L
June Jordan	1936–2002	American	Poet, essayist, teacher, activist	B
Leslie Jordan	1955–2022	American	Actor	G
Orlando Jordan	b. 1974	American	Professional wrestler	B
Jonathan Joss	1965–2025	American	Actor	G
Matthieu Jost	b. ?	French	Entrepreneur	G
Marcel Jouhandeau	1888–1979	French	Writer	G
Éric Jourdan	1938–2015	French	Novelist, playwright	G
Michel Journiac	1935–1995	French	Artist	G
Robert Joy	b. 1951	Canadian	Actor	G
Mychal F. Judge	1933–2001	American	Franciscan priest, FDNY chaplain, "Saint of 9/11"	G
Rafe Judkins	b. 1983	American	TV personality	G
Ildikó Juhász	b. 1953	Hungarian	LGBT rights activist	L
Isaac Julien	b. 1960	English	Installation artist, filmmaker, director	G
Jacqueline Julien	b. 1945	French	Lesbian activist	L
Bruno Julliard	b. 1981	French	Politician	G
Miranda July	b. 1974	American	Performance artist, filmmaker, writer	B
Hansol Jung	b. ?	South Korean	Translator, playwright	L
Sabine Jünger	b. 1973	German	Politician	L
Sondre Justad	b. 1990	Norwegian	Pop singer, musician	B
Jolie Justus	b. 1971	American	Politician	L
Claude Jutra	1930–1986	Canadian	Filmmaker	G
Kersti Juva	b. 1948	Finnish	Translator	L
Patrick Juvet	1950–2021	Swiss	Singer	B
Helvi Juvonen	1919–1959	Finnish	Poet	L

A · Ba–Bh · Bi–Bz · C · D · E · F · G · H · I · J · K · L · M · N · O
P · Q · R · Sa–Sc · Sd–Si · Sj–Sz · T · U · V · W · X · Y · Z

== See also ==
- List of gay, lesbian or bisexual people
