= Brigitte Boucheron =

French feminist and anarchist activist

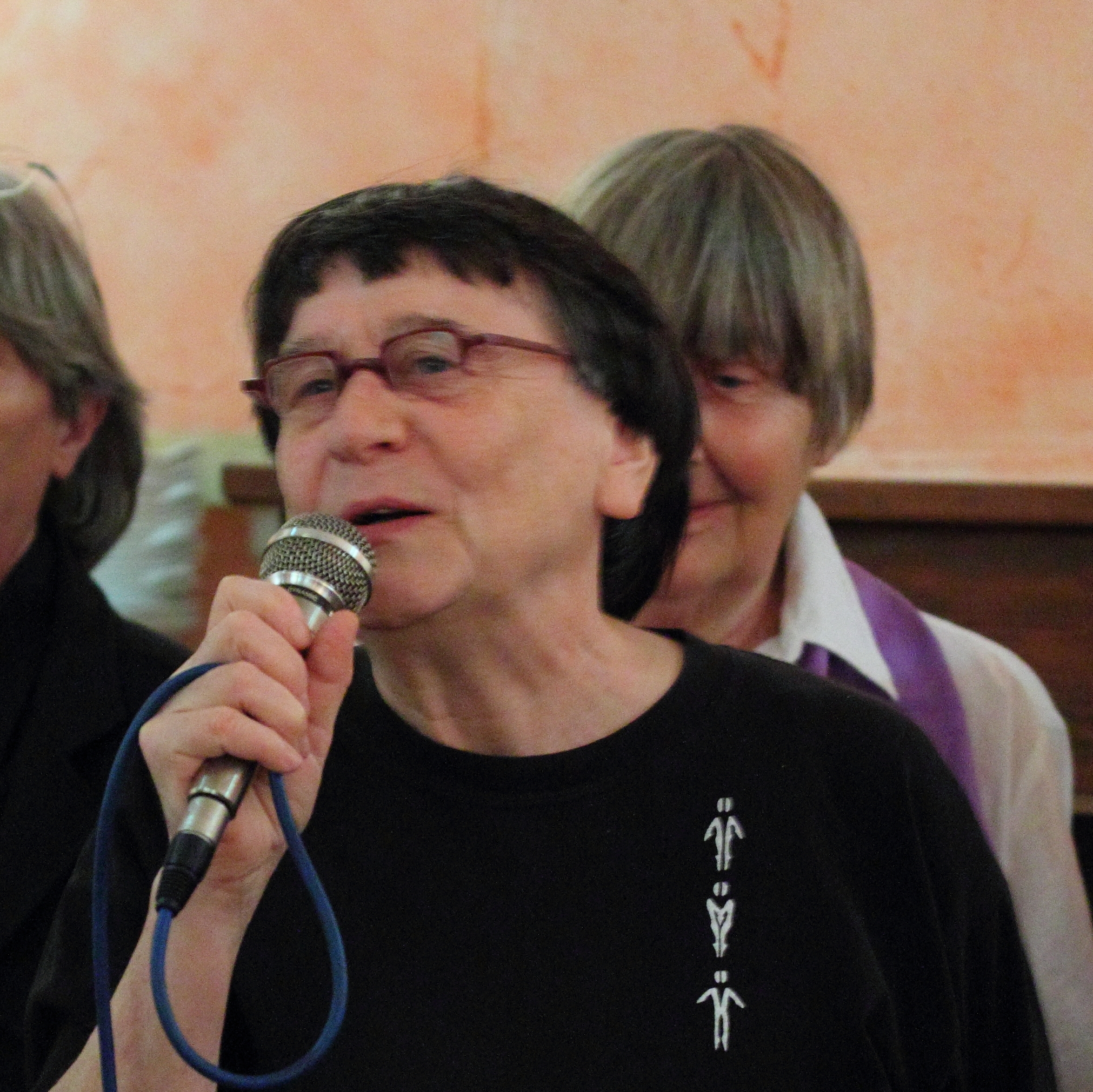
- in 2012
- Born: 23 August 1947 (age 78)
- Education: Universities in Nantes and Poitiers
- Known for: opening the Bagdam Cafee a real and later virtual focus for lesbian culture
- Partner: Jacqueline Julien

Brigitte Boucheron (born 23 August 1947) is a French feminist and anarchist Lesbian activist. She was a co-founder of the women-only Bagdam Cafée in Toulouse which opened in 1988. The cafe closed in 1999 but the name lives on with annual events as a focus for lesbian culture.

== Life ==
She was born in 1947. Her family were traders and as she grew up she read George Sand. She was academic but her exploits with a Catholic teacher's daughter got her expelled. Nevertheless she went on to study literature, art history and musicology at universities in Nantes and Poitiers. She met Jacqueline Julien.

In 1988 she and Jacqueline Julien opened the Bagdam Cafée in Toulouse. This open cafe is credited with moving the focus of French lesbian culture south. She and Julien had been active about ten years before but they had given up as it held no pleasure for them. Their creation was targeted at pleasure rather than politics, but this women only cafe was also part of a larger movement where lesbians were making themselves visible in society. Julien, at least, saw the cafe as a way of establishing a "new order". The cafe hosted seminars, concerts, film screenings, and art exhibitions.

The Bagdam Cafée closed on 1 January 1999 but its name continued in the Bagdam Espace Lesbien. This was more than a web presence, although that was part of it. The organisation published books, organised an annual festival named "Lesbian Spring", created other events as well as contesting legal events and organising protests.

== Publications et contributions ==
- with Jacqueline Julien, Le sexe sur le bout de la langue (Sex on the Tip of your Tongue), Toulouse, Espace Lesbien, 2002.
- France, 1990s, the lesbian decade, communication in the seminar Orientation and sexual identity, gender issues, Université Toulouse-Jean-Jaurès, 12 mai 1999.
- Introduction to a history of the lesbian movement in France', contribution Visibility / invisibility of lesbians, Coordination lesbienne en France (CLF), Paris, 19 mai 2007.
