= List of gay, lesbian or bisexual people: Sd–Si =

This is a partial list of notable people who were or are gay men, lesbian or bisexual.

The historical concept and definition of sexual orientation varies and has changed greatly over time; for example the general term "gay" was not used to describe sexual orientation until the mid 20th century. A number of different classification schemes have been used to describe sexual orientation since the mid-19th century, and scholars have often defined the term "sexual orientation" in divergent ways. Indeed, several studies have found that much of the research about sexual orientation has failed to define the term at all, making it difficult to reconcile the results of different studies. However, most definitions include a psychological component (such as the direction of an individual's erotic desire) and/or a behavioural component (which focuses on the sex of the individual's sexual partner/s). Some prefer to simply follow an individual's self-definition or identity.

The high prevalence of people from the West on this list may be due to societal attitudes towards homosexuality. The Pew Research Center's 2013 Global Attitudes Survey found that there is "greater acceptance in more secular and affluent countries," with "publics in 39 countries [having] broad acceptance of homosexuality in North America, the European Union, and much of Latin America, but equally widespread rejection in predominantly Muslim nations and in Africa, as well as in parts of Asia and in Russia. Opinion about the acceptability of homosexuality is divided in Israel, Poland and Bolivia." As of 2013, Americans are divided – a majority (60 percent) believes homosexuality should be accepted, while 33 percent disagree.

== Sd–Si ==
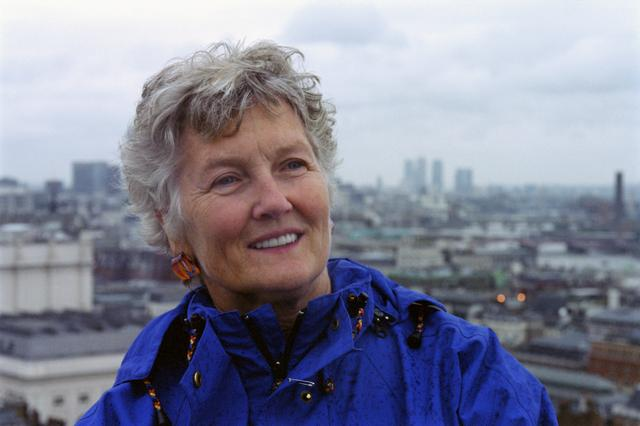
Folk singer Peggy Seeger

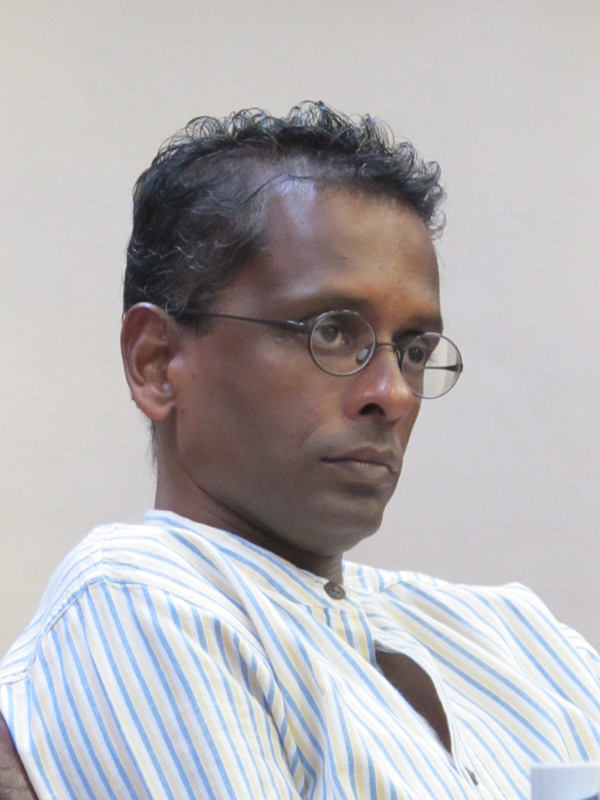
Author Shyam Selvadurai

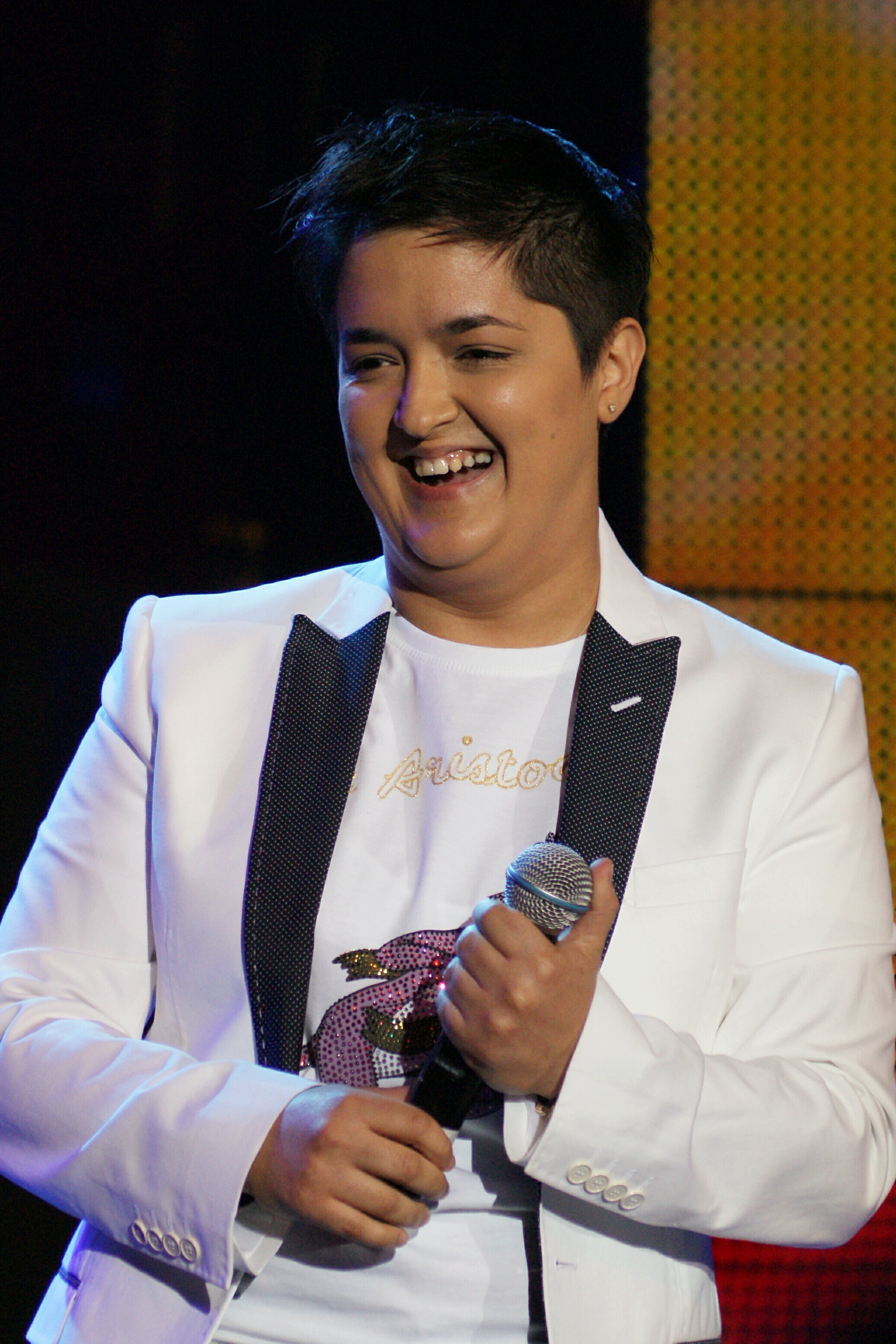
Singer Marija Šerifović

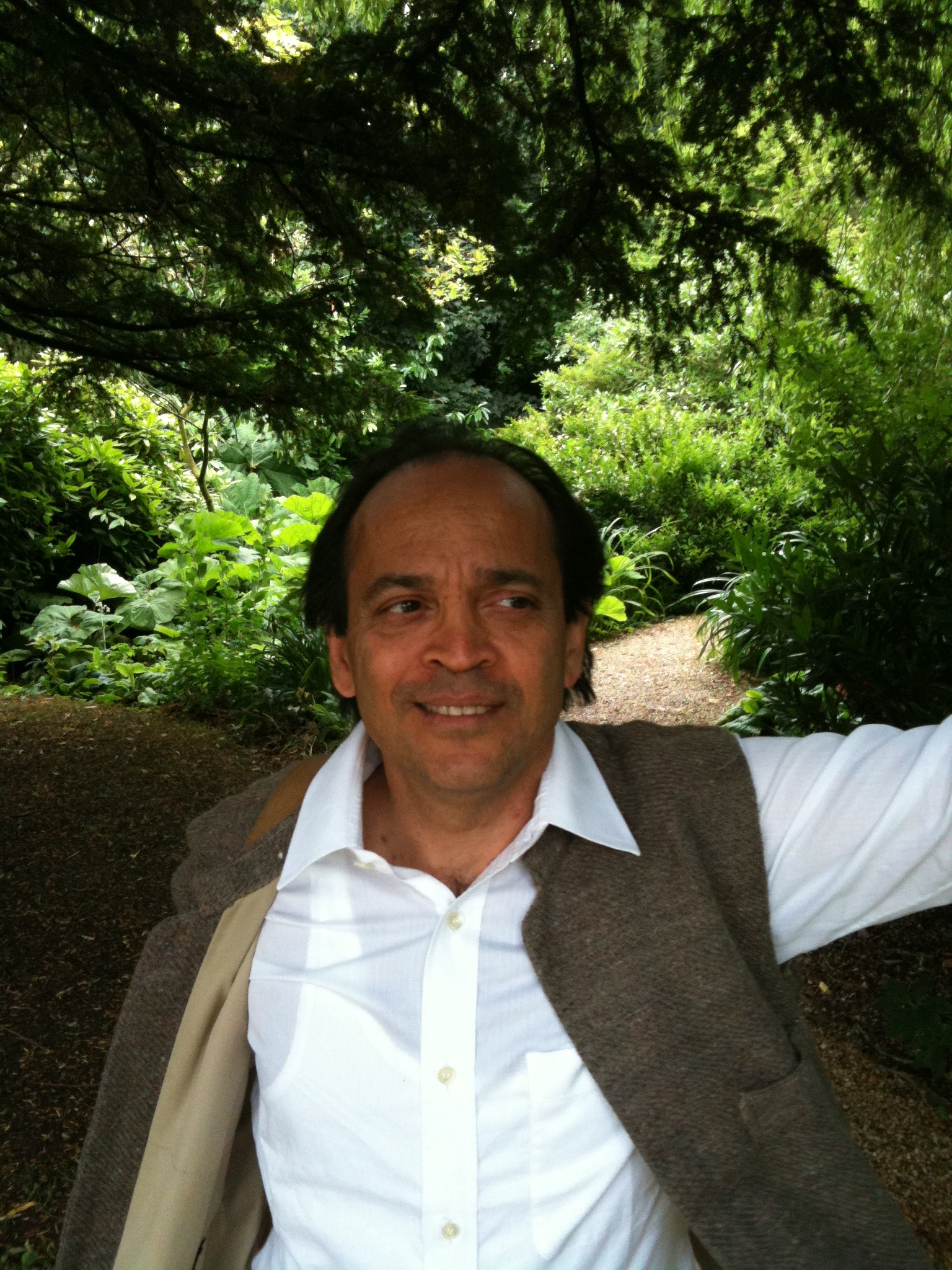
Writer and poet Vikram Seth

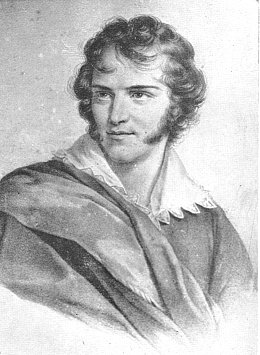
Poet and actor Tommaso Sgricci

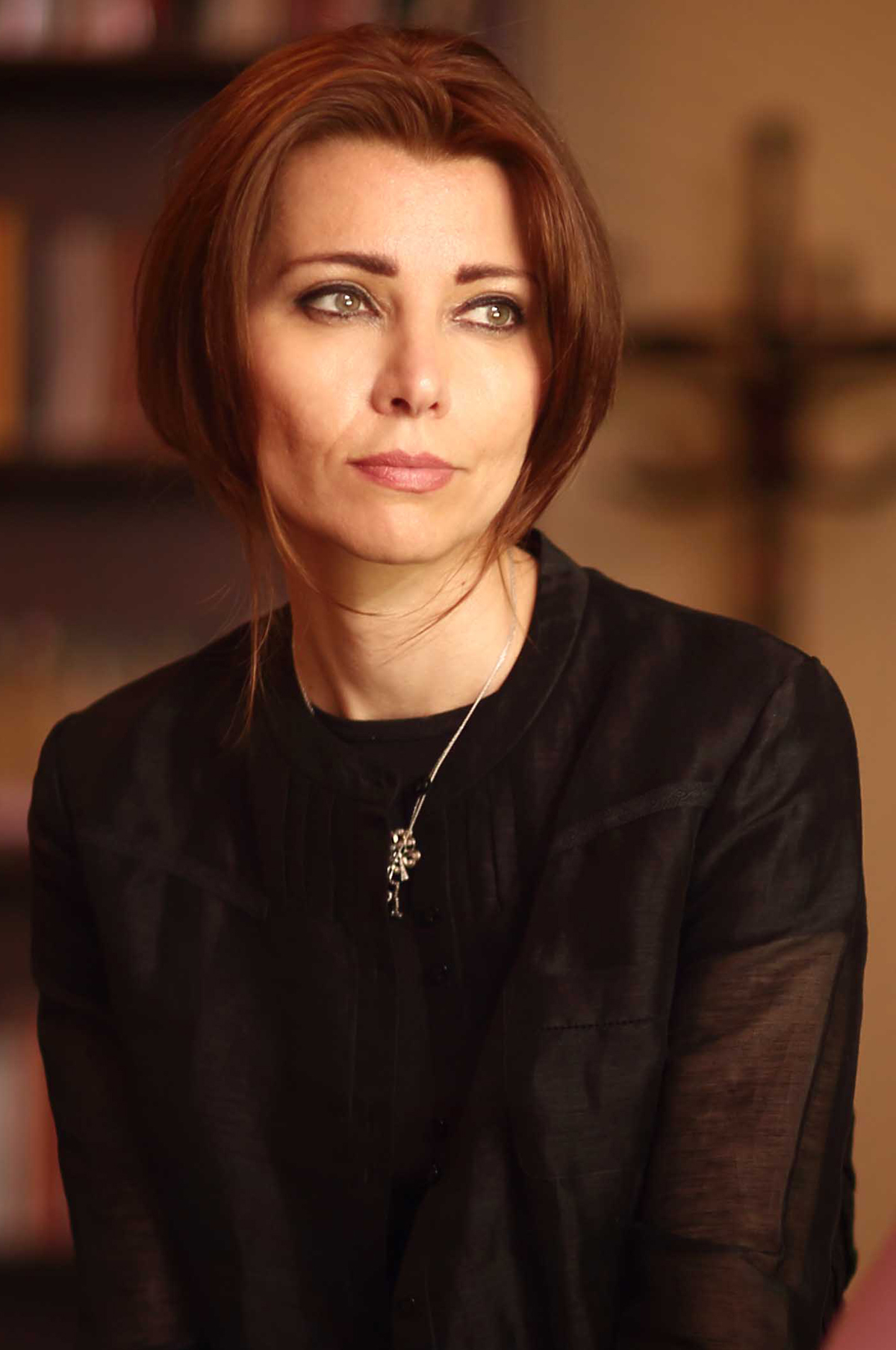
Writer, public speaker, and women's rights activist Elif Shafak

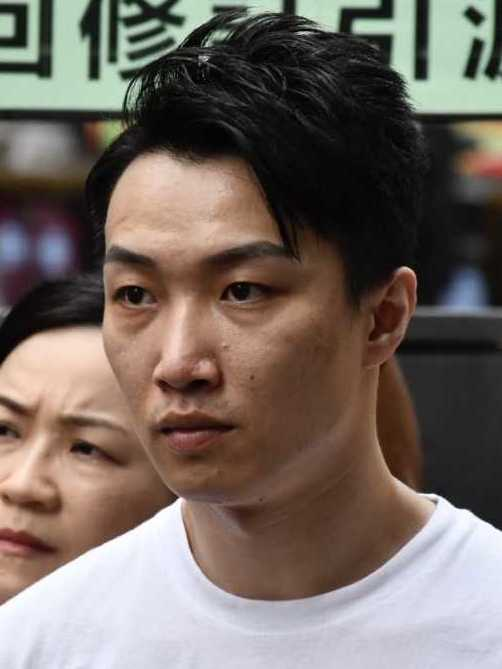
Pro-democracy and LGBT rights activist Jimmy Sham

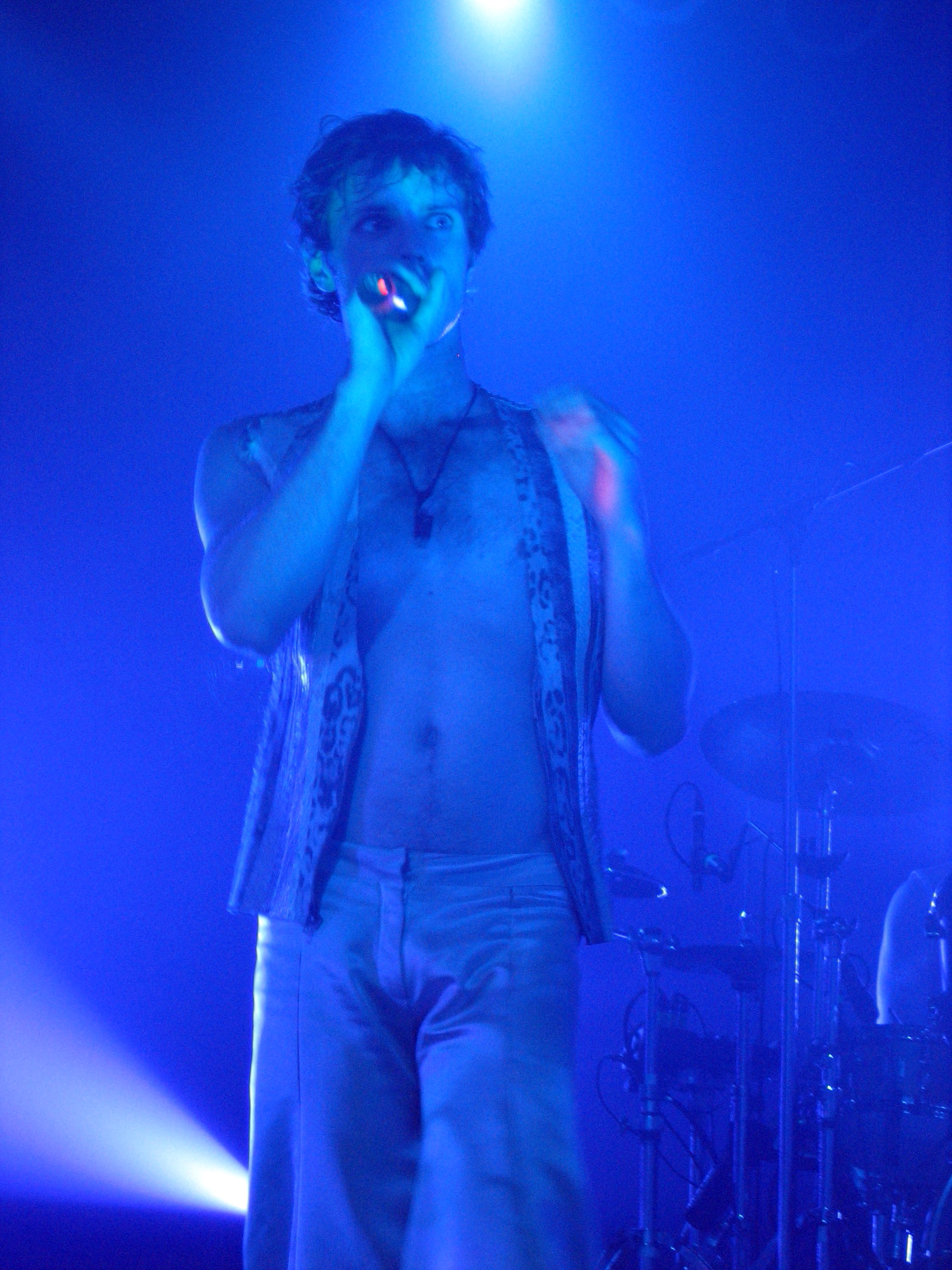
Musician Jake Shears

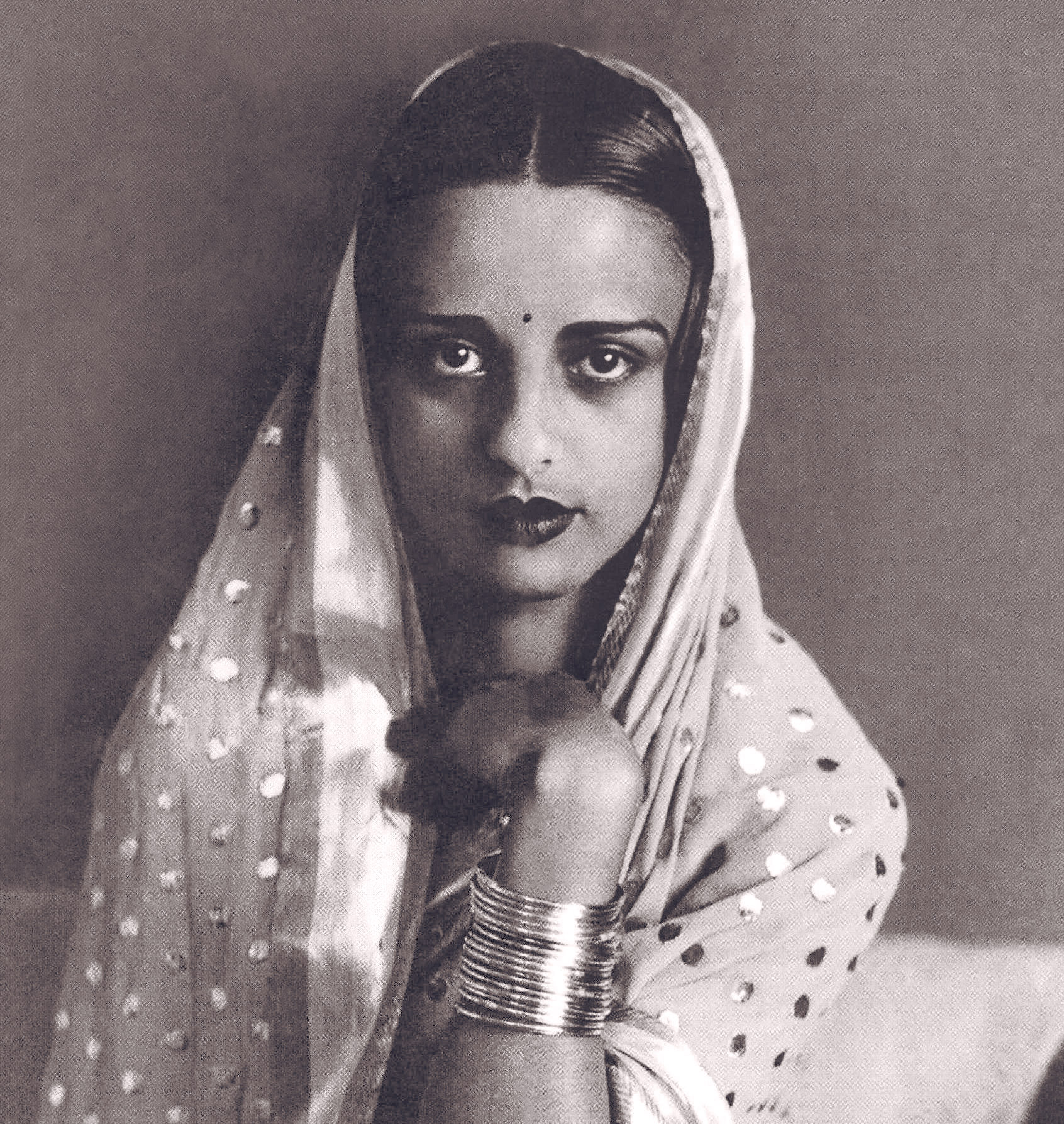
Painter Amrita Sher-Gil

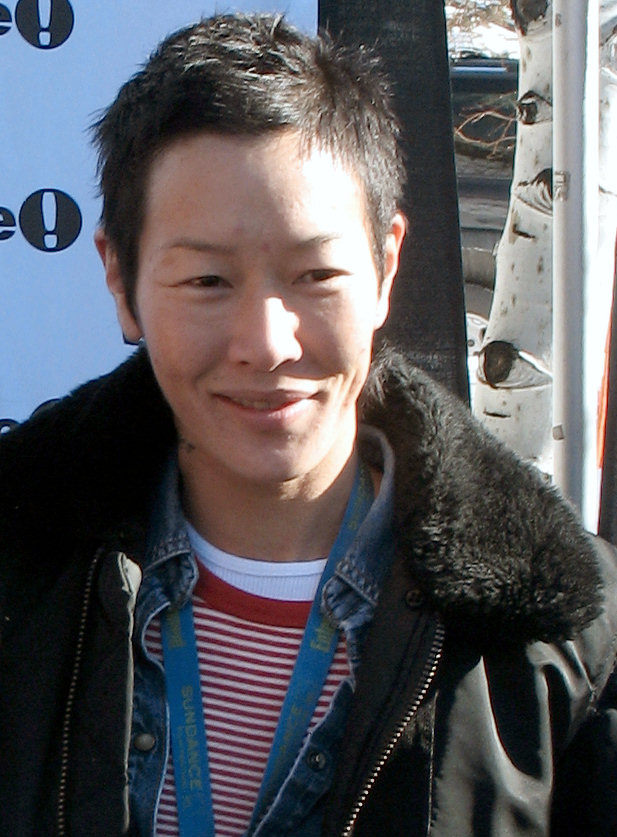
Model and actor Jenny Shimizu

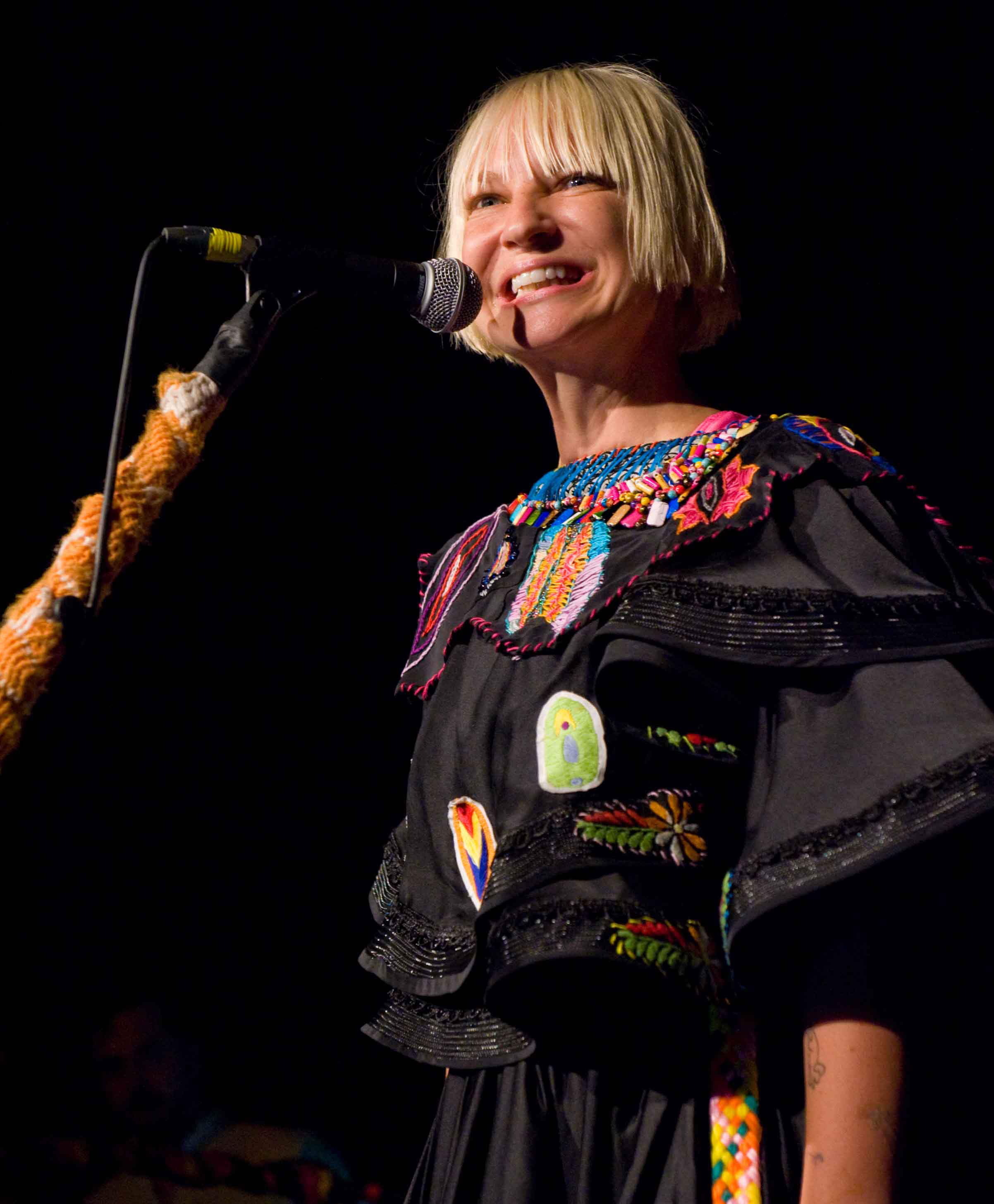
Singer and songwriter Sia

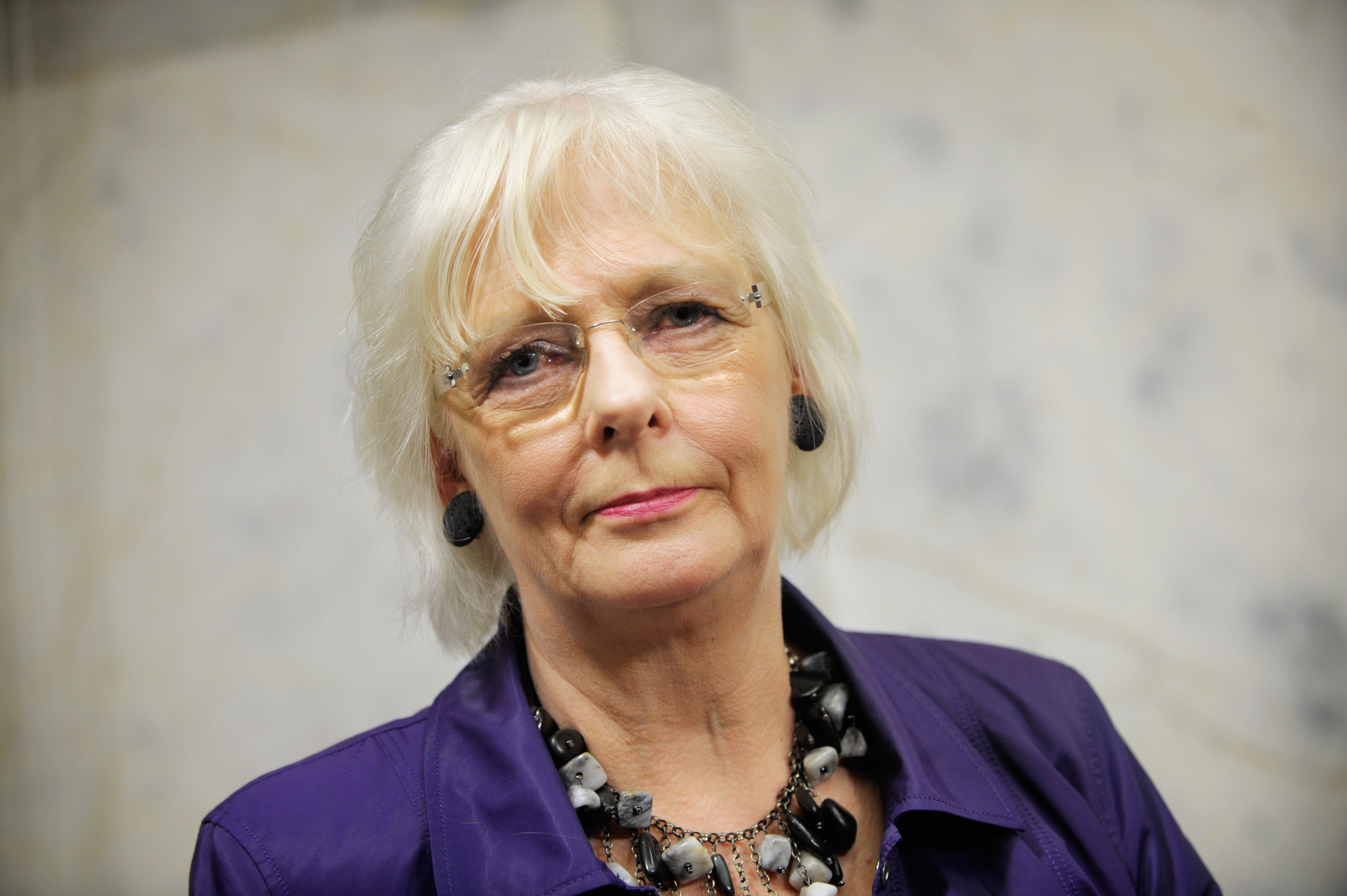
Former Icelandic Prime Minister Jóhanna Sigurðardóttir

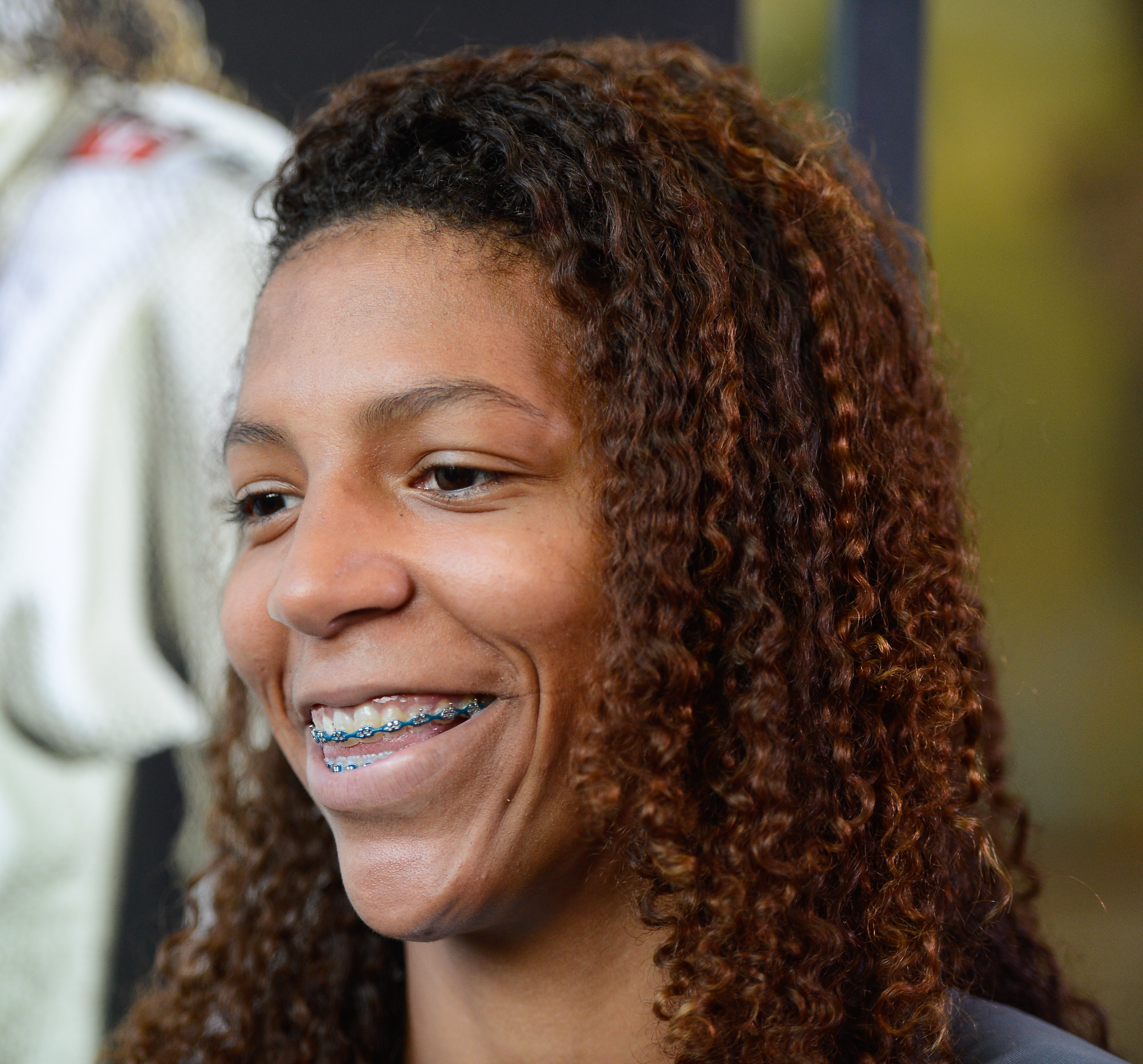
Judoka Rafaela Silva

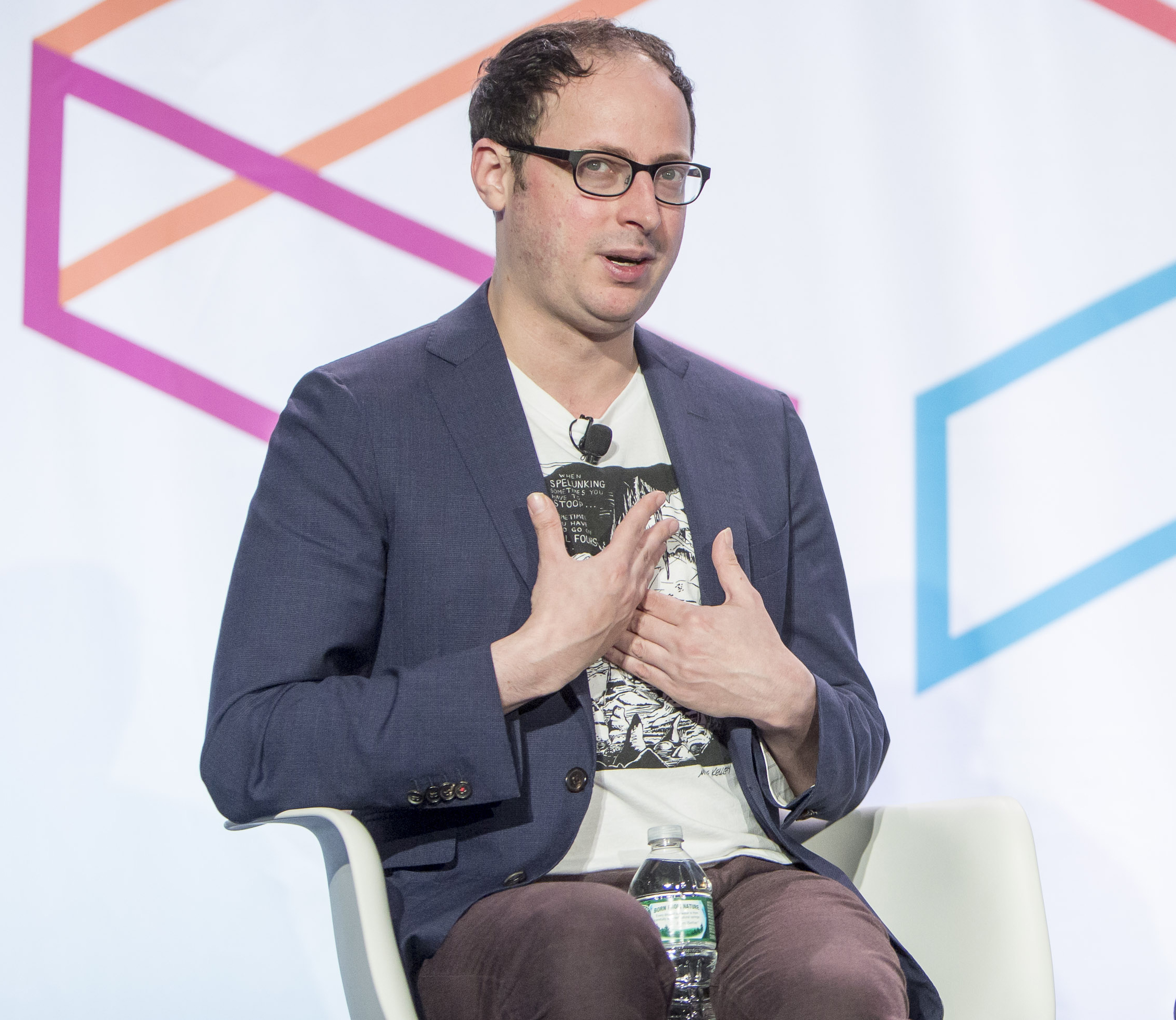
Statistician Nate Silver

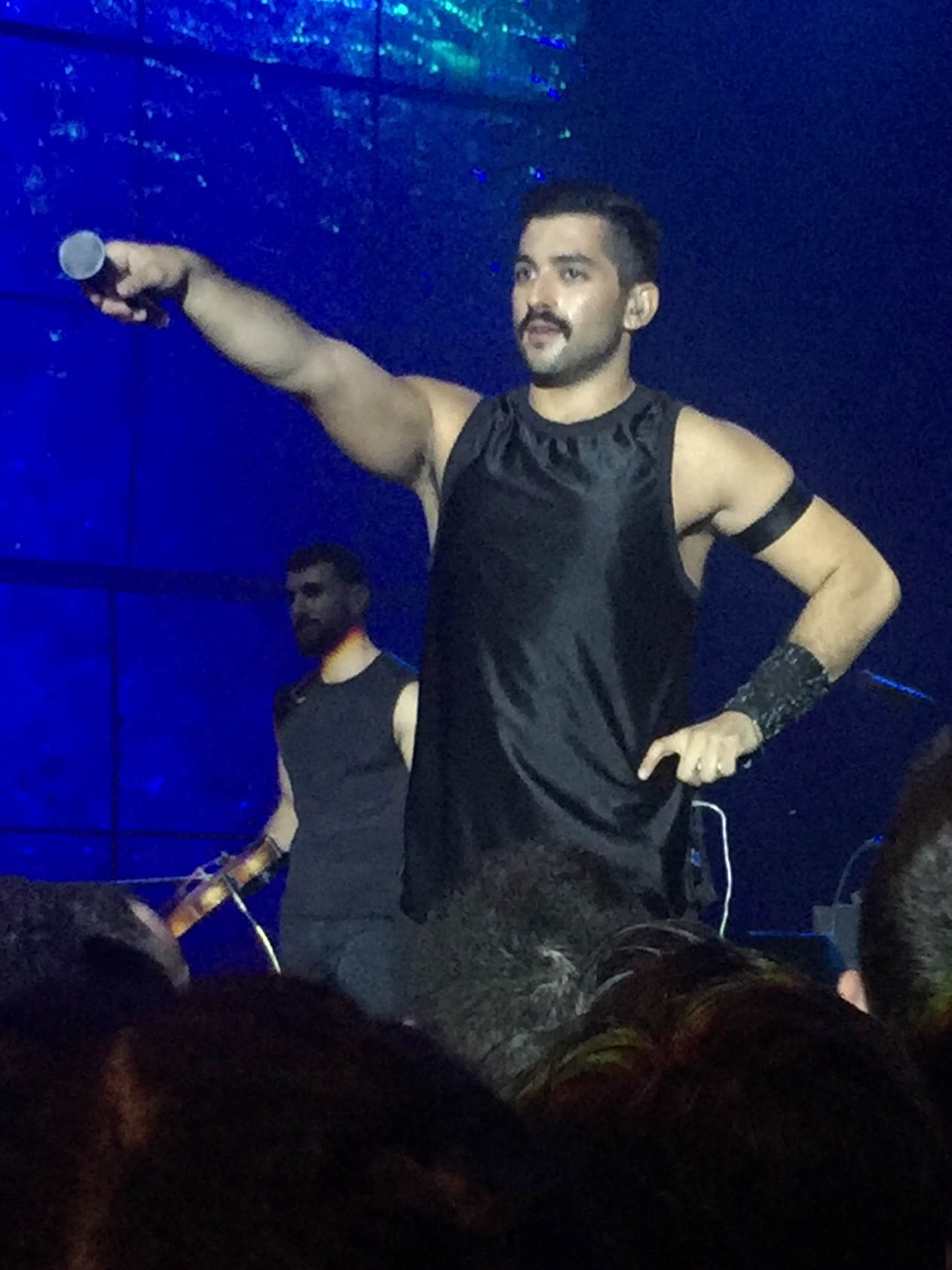
Singer Hamed Sinno

Name	Lifetime	Nationality	Notable as	Notes
Daniela Sea	b. 1977	American	Filmmaker, actor, musician	B
Jason Sechrest	b. 1979	American	Writer, actor	G
David Secter	b. 1979	Canadian	Film director	G
David Sedaris	b. 1956	American	Writer, radio personality	G
Walter Sedlmayr	1926–1990	German	Actor	G
Anna Sedokova	b. 1982	Ukrainian	Singer, actor, TV presenter	B
Peggy Seeger	b. 1935	American	Folk singer	B
Pierre Seel	1923–2005	French	WWII concentration camp survivor, writer	G
Caroline Seger	b. 1985	Swedish	Footballer	L
Guenter Seidel	b. 1960	American	Equestrian	G
Stéphane Séjourné	b. 1985	French	Politician	G
Sonia Sekula	1918–1963	Swiss	Painter	L
Andrzej Selerowicz	b. 1948	Polish	LGBT activist, writer, translator	G
Jeffery Self	b. 1987	American	Actor	G
Stephanie Sellars	b. ?	American	Writer, actor	B
Shyam Selvadurai	b. 1965	Sri Lankan-Canadian	Writer	G
Caster Semenya	b. 1991	South African	Middle-distance runner	L
Maurice Sendak	1928–2012	American	Author, illustrator	G
Seo Dong-jin	b. ?	South Korean	Sociologist, cultural critic	G
Joe Serafini	b. 1998	American	Actor	B
Julia Serano	b. 1967	American	Writer, spoken word performer	L
Marija Šerifović	b. 1984	Serbian	Pop singer	L
Serpentwithfeet	b. 1989	American	Experimental musician	G
António Serzedelo	b. 1945	Portuguese	Human rights activist, radio broadcaster, actor, scholar	G
John Sessions	1953–2020	Scottish	Actor	G
Kevin Sessums	b. 1956	American	Writer	G
Vikram Seth	b. 1952	Indian	Poet, writer	G
Luigi Settembrini	1813–1877	Italian	Writer, nationalist	G
Wolfram Setz	1941–2023	German	Historian, editor, translator, essayist	G
Pascal Sevran	1945–2008	French	Author, TV presenter, singer	G
Tommy Sexton	1957–1993	Canadian	Comedian, actor	G
Tommaso Sgricci	1789–1836	Italian	Poet, actor	G
Glenn Shadix	1952–2010	American	Actor	G
Elif Shafak	b. 1971	Turkish-British	Novelist, essayist, academic, public speaker, women's rights activist	B
Dirk Shafer	b. 1962	American	Model, actor	G
Peter Shaffer	1926–2016	English	Playwright	G
Ramses Shaffy	1933–2009	Dutch	Singer, actor	B
Shah Hussain	1538–1599	Indian-Pakistani	Poet	G
Shahin Shahablou	1964–2020	Iranian	Photographer	G
Marc Shaiman	b. 1959	American	Composer, lyricist	G
Jimmy Sham	b. 1987	Hong Kong	Political and LGBT rights activist	G
Otep Shamaya	b. 1979	American	Rock musician (Otep)	L
Miss Shangay Lily	1963–2016	Spanish	Activist, drag queen	G
Adam Shankman	b. 1964	American	Film director	G
Charles Haslewood Shannon	1865–1937	English	Artist	G
Lori Shannon	1938–1984	American	Actor	L
Eric Shanower	b. 1963	American	Comics artist, writer	G
Michael Shaowanasai	b. 1964	Thai	Artist, actor	G
Ari Shapiro	b. 1978	American	Radio broadcaster	G
Eve Shapiro	1930–2022	South African	Drama teacher and theatre director	L
Milly Shapiro	b. 2002	American	Actor, singer	L
Irene Sharaff	1910–1993	American	Costume designer	L
Omar Sharif Jr.	b. 1983	Egyptian-Canadian	Actor, model, activist	G
Kevin Sharkey	b. 1960	Irish	Artist, activist	B
Parvez Sharma	b. 1976	Indian-American	Filmmaker, author, journalist	G
Alena Sharp	b. 1981	Canadian	Golfer	L
Maia Sharp	b. ?	American	Singer-songwriter	L
Penny Sharpe	b. 1970	Australian	Politician	L
Anna Sharyhina	b. 1978	Ukrainian	Feminist, LGBT activist	L
Aiden Shaw	b. 1966	English	Pornographic actor, writer	G
Brian Shaw	1928–1992	English	Ballet dancer, teacher	G
Fiona Shaw	b. 1955	Irish	Actor	L
Raqib Shaw	b. 1974	Indian-English	Artist	G
Robert Gould Shaw III	1898–1970	English	Socialite	G
Alia Shawkat	b. 1989	American	Actor	B
Linda Shear	b. 1948	American	Rock musician, activist	L
Jake Shears	b. 1978	American	Rock/pop musician, singer-songwriter (Scissor Sisters)	G
Jeff Sheehy	b. ?	American	Politician	G
Jeremy Sheffield	b. 1966	English	Actor	G
Bradford Shellhammer	b. 1976	American	Entrepreneur, designer	G
Dominic Shellard	b. 1966	English	Academic administrator, theatre historian	G
George Shelley	b. 1993	English	Pop singer (Union J), radio presenter	B
Pete Shelley	1955–2018	English	Rock musician (Buzzcocks)	B
James Sheldon	1920–2016	American	Director	B
Lynn Shelton	1965–2020	American	Filmmaker	B
Jeff Sheng	b. 1980	American	Photographer	G
Matthew Shepard	1976–1998	American	Murder victim	G
Reginald Shepherd	1963–2008	American	Poet	G
Simon Sheppard	1948–2021	American	Writer	G
Antony Sher	b. 1949	English	Actor	G
Amrita Sher-Gil	1913–1941	Hungarian-Indian	Painter	B
Hugh Sheridan	b. 1985	Australian	Actor, singer	B
David Sherlock	b. ?	English	Writer	G
Delia Sherman	b. 1951	American	Writer	L
Martin Sherman	b. 1938	American	Playwright, director	G
Michael Shernoff	1951–2008	American	Specialist in the mental health concerns of gay men	G
Ned Sherrin	1931–2007	English	TV and radio personality	G
Bill Sherwood	1952–1990	American	Musician, screenwriter, film director	G
Shi Pei Pu	1938–2009	Chinese	Opera singer, spy, inspired the play M. Butterfly	G
Randy Shilts	1951–1994	American	Journalist, writer, AIDS activist	G
Meleana Shim	b. 1991	American	Soccer player	L
Jenny Shimizu	b. 1967	American	Model, actor	L
Sab Shimono	b. 1937	American	Actor	G
William F. Shipley	1921–2011	American	Linguist, professor	G
Shitou	b. 1969	Chinese	Activist, actor, filmmaker, multimedia artist	L
Itzik Shmuli	b. 1980	Israeli	Politician	G
Gil Shohat	b. 1973	Israeli	Classical music composer, conductor, pianist, lecturer	G
Alireza Shojaian	b. 1988	Iranian	Painter	G
Del Shores	b. 1957	American	Writer, director, actor	G
Hassard Short	1877–1956	English-American	Theatre director	G
Evgeny Shtorn	b. 1983	Kazakh-Russian	LGBT activist, organizer, scholar, poet	G
Shunda K	b. 1980	American	Rapper (Yo Majesty)	L
Nerina Shute	1908–2004	English	Writer, journalist	B
Sia	b. 1975	Australian	Pop singer	B
Choire Sicha	b. 1971	American	Writer, blogger	G
Bastian Sick	b. 1965	German	Journalist, author, linguist	G
Mark Sickles	b. 1957	American	Politician	G
Janis Sidovský	b. 1968	Czech	TV producer, manager	G
James Sie	b. ?	American	Actor, author	G
Christopher Sieber	b. 1969	American	Actor	G
Kate Siegel	b. 1982	American	Actor, screenwriter	B
Bianca Sierra	b. 1992	Mexican	Footballer	L
Eva Siewert	1907–1994	German	Journalist, writer, radio announcer, opera singer	L
Labi Siffre	b. 1945	English	Poet, songwriter, singer	G
Michelangelo Signorile	b. 1960	American	Writer, LGBT rights activist	G
Alfonso Signorini	b. 1964	Italian	TV and radio presenter, journalist, magazine editor	G
Roy Sigüenza	b. 1958	Ecuadorian	Poet	G
Jóhanna Sigurðardóttir	b. 1942	Icelandic	Politician, first openly gay/lesbian Prime Minister in the world	L
Jendrik Sigwart	b. 1994	German	Singer	G
Richard Siken	b. 1967	American	Writer, poet	G
Ed Sikov	b. 1957	American	Writer	G
Bill Siksay	b. 1955	Canadian	Politician	G
Ayman Sikseck	b. 1984	Israeli-Arab	Author, literary critic, journalist	G
Steve Silberman	b. ?	American	Writer	G
Judee Sill	1944–1979	American	Singer-songwriter	B
Jari Sillanpää	b. 1966	Finnish	Pop singer	G
Ursula Sillge	b. 1946	German	Sociologist, LGBT right activist	L
Aguinaldo Silva	b. 1943	Brazilian	Playwright, screenwriter, journalist, filmmaker	G
ire'ne lara silva	b. ?	American	Poet, writer	L
Mario Silva	b. 1966	Canadian	Politician	G
Mayra Bueno Silva	b. 1991	Brazilian	Mixed martial artist	L
Rafael L. Silva	b. 1994	Brazilian-American	Actor	G
Rafaela Silva	b. 1992	Brazilian	Judoka	L
Sebastián Silva	b. 1979	Chilean	Film director	G
Lucas Silveira	b. 1979	Canadian	Rock musician (The Cliks)	G
Mikko Silvennoinen	b. 1975	Finnish	TV presenter, producer, editor	G
Josh Silver	b. 1989	British	Author	G
Nate Silver	b. 1978	American	Statistician, writer	G
Adam Silvera	b. 1990	American	Writer	G
Makeda Silvera	b. 1955	Jamaican-Canadian	Writer	G
Charles Silverstein	1935–2023	American	Writer	G
Edith Simcox	1844–1901	English	Writer	L
Eudy Simelane	1977–2008	South African	Footballer, LGBT rights activist, hate crime murder victim	L
Mima Simić	b. 1976	Croatian	Writer, film critic, translator, LGBT activist	L
Justin Simien	b. 1983	American	Film director, screenwriter	G
Joel Simkhai	b. 1976	Israeli-American	CEO and founder of geosocial networking and dating apps Grindr and Blendr	G
Georgia Simmerling	b. 1989	Canadian	Skier, cyclist	L
E. Denise Simmons	b. 1951	American	Politician	L
Jaason Simmons	b. 1970	American	Actor	G
Julian Simmons	b. 1952	Irish	TV presenter	G
Roy Simmons	1956–2014	American	American football player	G
Ana María Simo	b. ?	Cuban-American	Playwright, essayist, novelist	L
Joshua Simon	b. 1990	Singaporean	Radio presenter	G
Meagan Simonaire	b. 1990	American	Politician	B
António Simões	b. 1975	Portuguese	Banking executive	G
Nicholas Simons	b. ?	Canadian	Politician	G
Mark Simpson	b. ?	English	Journalist, writer, broadcaster	G
Marnie Simpson	b. ?	English	Reality TV personality	B
Brian Sims	b. 1978	American	Politician; 1st openly gay elected state legislator in Pennsylvania's history	G
Jamal Sims	b. ?	American	Choreographer, director	G
Mary-Woo Sims	b. ?	Canadian	Politician, activist	L
Reynhard Sinaga	b. 1983	Indonesian	Convicted serial rapist	G
H. A. Sinclair de Rochemont	1901–1942	Dutch	Fascist, Nazi collaborator	G
Nikki Sinclaire	b. 1968	English	Politician	L
Kyrsten Sinema	b. 1976	American	Politician	B
Alan Sinfield	1941–2017	English	Professor, literary critic	G
Bryan Singer	b. 1965	American	Film director	B
Gary Singer	b. ?	Australian	Politician	G
Winnaretta Singer	1865–1943	American	Patron	L
Lilly Singh	b. 1988	Canadian	Comedian and YouTube personality	B
Ranj Singh	b. 1979	British	Doctor, TV presenter, author	G
Paul Sinha	b. 1970	English	GP, Comedian, Broadcaster Quiz player	G
Hella von Sinnen	b. 1959	German	Comedian	L
Hamed Sinno	b. 1988	Lebanese	Rock singer, musician (Mashrou' Leila)	G
Renée Sintenis	1888–1965	German	Sculptor, Olympic art medalist	L
Oliver Sipple	1941–1989	American	Military veteran	G
Clara Sipprell	1885–1975	Canadian	Photographer	L
Ramchandra Siras	1948–2010	Indian	Author, linguist, professor	G
Christian Siriano	b. 1985	American	Fashion designer, reality TV personality	G
Osbert Sitwell	1892–1969	English	Writer	G
Terence Siufay	b. 1976	Macanese	Musical artist	G
Troye Sivan	b. 1995	Australian	YouTube personality, singer, songwriter	G
JoJo Siwa	b. 2003	American	Dancer, singer, YouTuber	B
Siya	b. 1987	American	Rapper	L

== See also ==
- List of gay, lesbian or bisexual people
