= List of gay, lesbian or bisexual people =

This is a list of notable gay men, lesbian or bisexual people who have been open about their sexuality.

The definition of sexual orientation has changed greatly over time and the general term "gay" was not used to describe sexual orientation until the mid 20th century. A number of different classification schemes have been used to describe sexual orientation since the mid-19th century. Much of the research about sexual orientation has failed to define the term at all, making it difficult to reconcile the results of different studies.

However, most definitions include a psychological component (such as the direction of an individual's erotic desire) and/or a behavioural component (which focuses on the sex of the individual's sexual partner/s). Some prefer to simply follow an individual's self-definition or identity. The high prevalence of people from the West on this list may be due to societal attitudes toward homosexuality. The Pew Research Center's 2013 Global Attitudes Survey found that there is "greater acceptance in more secular and affluent countries," with "publics in 39 countries [having] broad acceptance of homosexuality in North America, the European Union, and much of Latin America, but equally widespread rejection in predominantly Muslim nations and in Africa, as well as in parts of Asia and in Russia. Opinion about the acceptability of homosexuality is divided in Israel, Poland and Bolivia." As of 2013, Americans are divided: A majority (60 percent) believes homosexuality should be accepted, while 33 percent disagree. Attitudes towards homosexuality in Latin American countries have increasingly been more legally tolerant, but Mexico and Brazil have remained unaccepting about the subject.

A · Ba–Bh · Bi–Bz · C · D · E · F · G · H · I · J · K · L · M · N · O
P · Q · R · Sa–Sc · Sd–Si · Sj–Sz · T · U · V · W · X · Y · Z

== Persons of confirmed lesbian, gay or bisexual orientation ==
The following list includes notable people who have self-identified as homosexual or bisexual.

- List of gay, lesbian or bisexual people: A
- List of gay, lesbian or bisexual people: Ba–Bh
- List of gay, lesbian or bisexual people: Bi–Bz
- List of gay, lesbian or bisexual people: C
- List of gay, lesbian or bisexual people: D–E
- List of gay, lesbian or bisexual people: F
- List of gay, lesbian or bisexual people: G
- List of gay, lesbian or bisexual people: H
- List of gay, lesbian or bisexual people: I–J
- List of gay, lesbian or bisexual people: K
- List of gay, lesbian or bisexual people: L
- List of gay, lesbian or bisexual people: M
- List of gay, lesbian or bisexual people: N–O
- List of gay, lesbian or bisexual people: P–Q
- List of gay, lesbian or bisexual people: R
- List of gay, lesbian or bisexual people: Sa–Sc
- List of gay, lesbian or bisexual people: Sd–Si
- List of gay, lesbian or bisexual people: Sj–Sz
- List of gay, lesbian or bisexual people: T–V
- List of gay, lesbian or bisexual people: W–Z

== See also ==
- Lists of bisexual people
- List of LGBT African Americans
- List of LGBTQ Jews
- Lists of LGBTQ people
- List of people with non-binary gender identities
- List of transgender people
- LGBTQ

Fictional

- Lists of LGBTQ figures in fiction and myth
