= Jacqueline Julien =

French feminist (born 1945)

- Born: 22 July 1945 (age 81); Rabat
- Known for: co-founded the Bagdam Cafee in Toulouse
- Children: a son

Jacqueline Julien (born 22 July 1945) is a French feminist, film maker and lesbian role model. She co-founded the Bagdam Cafée in Toulouse. This cafe is credited with moving the focus of French lesbian culture south. It closed after ten years but its virtual self continues today.

== Life ==
Julien was born in Rabat in Morocco in 1945. Her family were from Beauce. Her brother, who was eleven years older than her, was a non-commissioned officer during the Algerian war. She boarded at the Dreux college and Chartres high school. She discovered she was attracted to women and she punished twice for misconduct. She met Brigette Boucheron in Poitiers.

In about 1987 she was one of four partners who formed a successful consulting company for publishers. In 1988 she and Brigitte Boucheron opened the Bagdam Cafée in Toulouse. This cafe is credited with moving the focus of French lesbian culture south, although Julien acknowledged that Toulouse had embraced the women's movement. She and Boucheron had been activists about ten years before but they had given up campaigning as it held no pleasure for them. Their cafe creation was targeted at pleasure as well as politics. This strictly women only cafe was part of a larger movement where lesbians were making themselves visible in society. Julien saw the cafe as a way of establishing a "new order".

The cafe only allowed women inside but it did not specify their sexual orientation. Nevertheless, the cafe was the focus for lesbian culture in the area of France known as the midi pyrenee attracting 8,000 visits during its existence. In 1995 alone it had dozens of events from seminars to films and it collected money for lesbian based legal battles. In 1997 the cafe had 400 women members.

The Bagdam Cafée closed on 1 January 1999 but its name continued in the Bagdam Espace Lesbien. This was more than a web presence, although that was part of it. The organisation published books, organised an annual festival named "Lesbian Spring", created other events as well as contesting legal events and organising protests. Nicknames that Toulouse has gathered include the "Pink City" and "Lesbopolis."

Julienne has created films and her first short film "Yes, I am single!" won a prize in Rome. Her film ''Time Bomb'' was filmed in Toulouse because it is known as the lesbian city. The central characters of the film are a lesbian couple and she was able to find 100 extras from the lesbian community to make up crowd scenes.

In 2020 the Lesbian Spring Festival was scheduled. Julien was featured in the press noting that this was the first time that the town hall had publicised the event.

== Publications et contributions ==
- with Brigette Boucheron, Le sexe sur le bout de la langue (Sex on the Tip of your Tongue), Toulouse, Espace Lesbien, 2002.
