= Michal Jagelka =

Czech actor and presenter (born 1977)

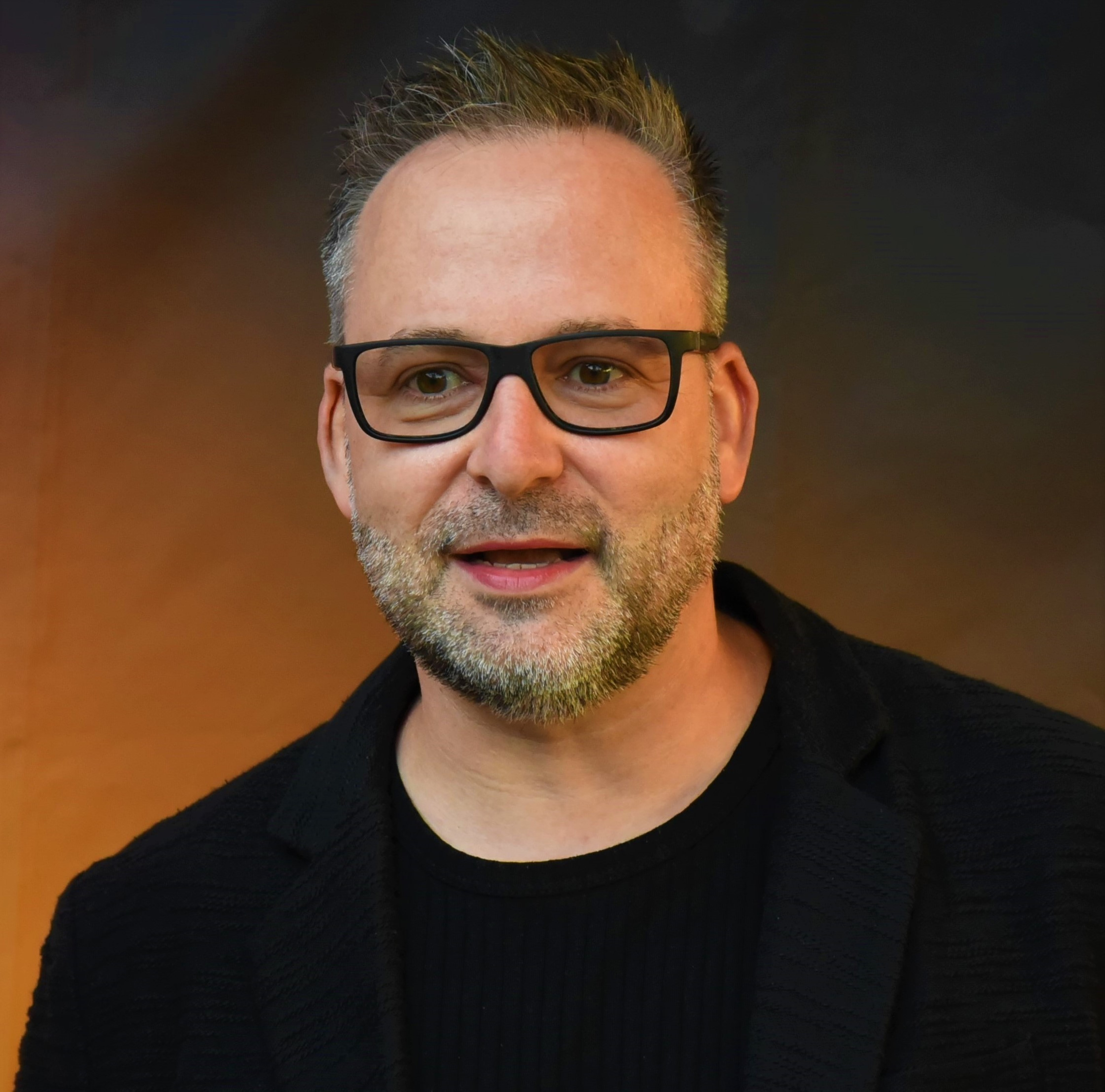
Michal Jagelka in 2020

Michal Jagelka (born 17 April 1977) is a Czech actor and voice actor, known for dubbing Leonardo DiCaprio, Matt Damon, Orlando Bloom and Bradley Cooper, among others.

== Biography ==
Michal was born in Prague, Czechoslovakia. He studied at the Prague Conservatory. He hosted in a radio Golden Prague.

== Theatre ==
=== Háta Theatre Company ===
- Smrt Hippodmaie (2002) .... Thyest
- Blázinec v prvním patře
- Vlčí srdce
- Jsme holt už takový
- Prázdniny snů .... Arnaud Fauchin
- Na správné adrese .... Jean

=== Jaroslav Ježek Conservatory ===
- Tartuff .... Molière
- Slaměný klobouk .... Felix

== Filmography ==
=== TV series ===
- Nováci (1995)
- Hospoda (1996)
- Ulice (2005)

== Dubbing roles ==
- Matt Damon
  - Will & Grace (Owen)
  - House of Lies (Himself)
  - Saving Private Ryan (James Francis Ryan)
  - The Talented Mr. Ripley (Tom Ripley)
  - Rounders (Mike McDermott)
  - Good Will Hunting (Will Hunting)
  - Dogma (Loki)
  - Ocean's Eleven (Linus Caldwell)
  - Ocean's Twelve (Linus Caldwell)
  - Syriana (Bryan Woodman)
  - The Brothers Grimm (Will Grimm)
  - Ocean's Thirteen (Linus Caldwell)
  - The Good Shepherd (Edward Wilson)
  - Jersey Girl (PR Exec.)
  - The Informant! (Mark Whitacre)
  - Hereafter (George Lonegan)
  - Green Zone (Roy Miller)
  - The Rainmaker (Rudy Baylor)
  - True Grit (LaBoeuf)
  - Invictus (Francois Pienaar)
  - The Adjustment Bureau (David Norris)
  - Contagion (Mitch Emhoff)
  - Stuck on You (Bob Tenor)
  - We Bought a Zoo (Benjamin Mee)
  - Promised Land (Steve Butler)
  - Margaret (Mr. Aaron)
  - Behind the Candelabra (Scott Thorson)
  - The Monuments Men (James Granger)
  - Thor: Ragnarok (Loki actor)
  - No Sudden Move (Mike Lowen)
  - Stillwater (Bill Baker)
  - Thor: Love and Thunder (Loki actor)
  - Air (Sonny Vaccaro)
  - Oppenheimer (Leslie Groves)
  - Drive-Away Dolls (Gary Channel)
  - The Rip (Lt. Dane Dumars)
- Leonardo DiCaprio
  - Critters 3 (Josh)
  - Romeo + Juliet (Romeo Montague)
  - Titanic (Jack Dawson)
  - The Man in the Iron Mask (King Louis XIV / Philippe)
  - Marvin's Room (Hank Lacker)
  - The Beach (Richard)
  - Total Eclipse (Arthur Rimbaud)
  - Catch Me If You Can (Frank Abagnale)
  - Gangs of New York (Amsterdam Vallon)
  - The Aviator (Howard Hughes)
  - The Departed (William "Billy" Costigan Jr.)
  - Blood Diamond (Daniel "Danny" Archer)
  - Body of Lies (Roger Ferris)
  - Revolutionary Road (Frank Wheeler)
  - Hubble (Narrator)
  - Shutter Island (Edward "Teddy" Daniels)
  - Inception (Dom Cobb)
  - J. Edgar (J. Edgar Hoover)
  - The Great Gatsby (Jay Gatsby)
  - The Wolf of Wall Street (Jordan Belfort)
  - Before the Flood (Narrator)
  - Once Upon a Time in Hollywood (Rick Dalton)
  - Don't Look Up (Dr. Randall Mindy)
  - One Battle After Another ("Ghetto" Pat Calhoun / Bob Ferguson)
- Orlando Bloom
  - The Lord of the Rings: The Fellowship of the Ring (Legolas)
  - Pirates of the Caribbean: The Curse of the Black Pearl (Will Turner)
  - The Lord of the Rings: The Two Towers (Legolas)
  - Troy (Paris)
  - The Lord of the Rings: The Return of the King (Legolas)
  - The Calcium Kid (Jimmy "The Calcium Kid" Connelly)
  - Kingdom of Heaven (Balian of Ibelin)
  - Pirates of the Caribbean: Dead Man's Chest (Will Turner)
  - Elizabethtown (Drew Baylor)
  - Pirates of the Caribbean: At World's End (Will Turner)
  - The Three Musketeers (George Villiers, 1st Duke of Buckingham)
  - The Hobbit: The Desolation of Smaug (Legolas)
  - The Hobbit: The Battle of the Five Armies (Legolas)
  - Zulu (Brian Epkeen)
  - Pirates of the Caribbean: Dead Men Tell No Tales (Will Turner)
  - Unlocked (Jack Alcott)
  - The Outpost (Captain Benjamin D. Keating)
  - Gran Turismo (Danny Moore)
  - Red Right Hand (Cash)
- Bradley Cooper
  - Alias (Will Tippin)
  - The Hangover (Phil Wenneck)
  - I Want to Marry Ryan Banks (Todd Doherty)
  - He's Just Not That Into You (Ben)
  - The A-Team (Templeton Peck)
  - The Hangover Part II (Phil Wenneck)
  - Silver Linings Playbook (Patrizio "Pat" Solitano Jr.)
  - The Hangover Part III (Phil Wenneck)
- Brendan Fraser
  - Blast from the Past (Adam Webber)
  - Dudley Do-Right (Dudley Do-Right)
  - Bedazzled (Elliot Richards)
  - Scrubs (Ben Sullivan)
  - The Last Time (Jamie Bashant)
  - The Air I Breathe (Pleasure)
  - Furry Vengeance (Dan Sanders)
- Michael Winslow
  - Police Academy (Cadet Larvell Jones)
  - Police Academy 2: Their First Assignment (Officer Larvell Jones)
  - Police Academy 3: Back in Training (Sergeant Larvell Jones)
  - Police Academy 4: Citizens on Patrol (Sergeant Larvell Jones)
  - Police Academy 5: Assignment Miami Beach (Sergeant Larvell Jones)
  - Police Academy 6: City Under Siege (Sergeant Larvell Jones)
  - Police Academy: Mission to Moscow (Sergeant Larvell Jones)
- Ethan Hawke
  - White Fang (Jack Conroy)
  - White Fang 2: Myth of the White Wolf (Jack Conroy)
  - Great Expectations (Finnegan "Finn" Bell)
  - Before the Devil Knows You're Dead (Hank Hanson)
  - Sinister (Ellison Oswalt)

== Personal life ==
He is in civil union with Czech TV host Aleš Cibulka.
