= Anna Sharyhina =

Ukrainian feminist and LGBT rights activist

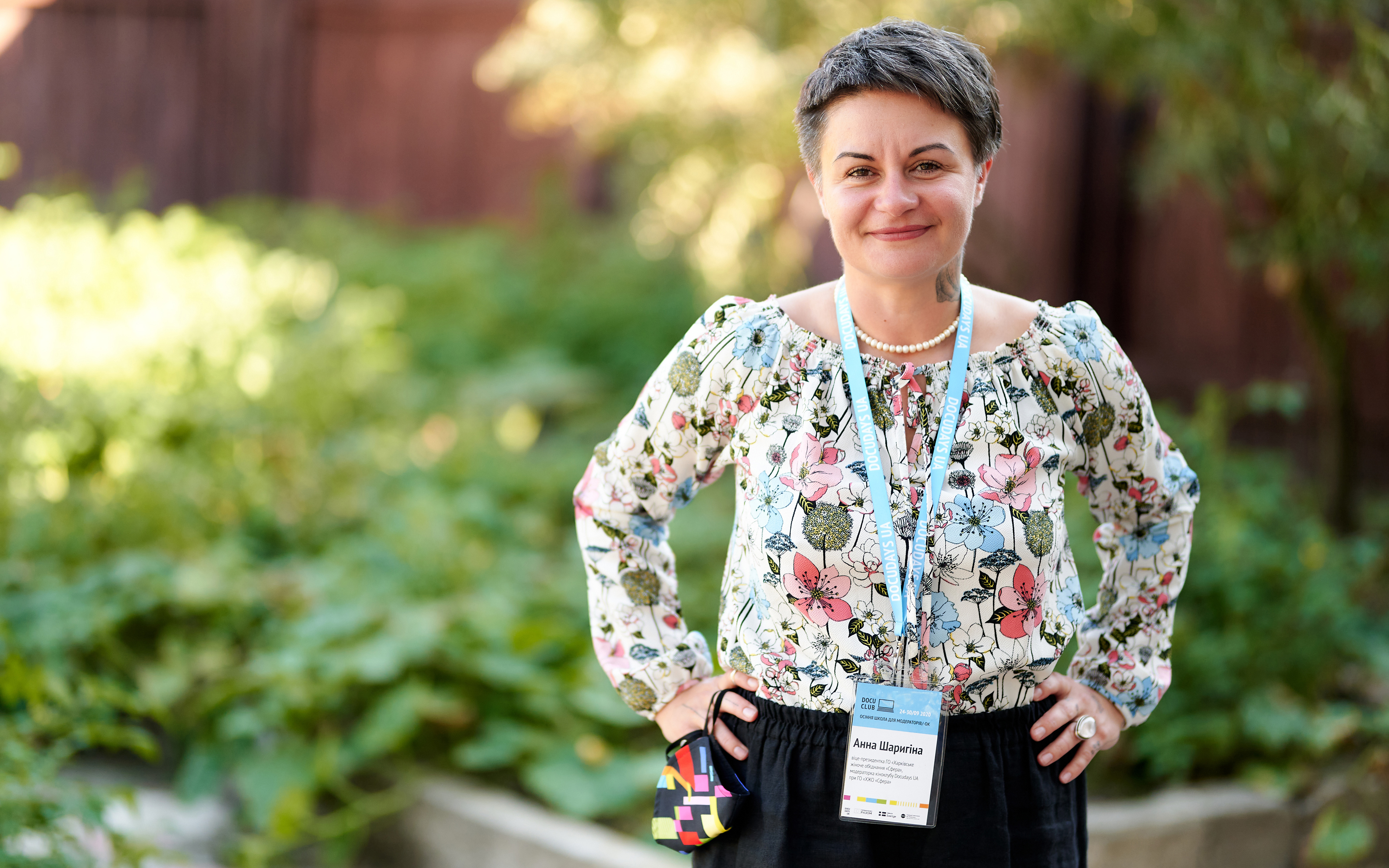
- Sharyhina in 2020
- Born: c. 1978 (age 47–48)
- Other name: Anna Borysivna Sharyhina
- Occupation: Activist
- Organization(s): Co-founder in NGO Woman Association Sphere and NGO Kyivpride

Anna Borysivna Sharyhina (Ukrainian: Анна Борисівна Шаригіна; born c. 1978) is a Ukrainian feminist and LGBT activist. She is a cofounder of the Sphere Women's Association, a lesbian feminist organisation in Kharkiv, and of the NGO Kyiv Pride, the organizing committee of the Pride Parade in Kyiv.

== Biography ==
Sharyhina was born into a Russian-speaking family.

Sharyhina and her partner, Vira Chemygina, have been involved in the Ukrainian LGBT community and lesbian organizations for over a decade. They organized Kyiv's first walks for equality. Kyiv's second walk for equality, held in 2015, was accompanied by police and had the support of a range of public figures. However, the march only lasted 15 minutes because of extreme-right violence against the marchers. Ten people, including police officers guarding the event, were injured.

Sharyhina's feminist and LGBT activity has faced continued opposition in Ukraine. When she gave a lecture on LGBT movements at a Kharkiv bookstore, the meeting needed to be relocated twice: first to Kharkiv’s Nakipelo press centre and then to Kyiv’s Izolyatsiya centre. PrideHub, a Kharkiv community center, was attacked by masked men with smoke grenades in July 2018; the building was later vandalised with graffiti and animal blood. Though complaints were made to police, and over 1,000 letters of complaint addressed to Interior Minister Arsen Avakov, nobody has been punished for the offence.

In March 2019, Sharyhina was amongst those organizing a Week of Women's Solidarity in Kharkiv for the first week of March:

The event’s goal is to return to the original essence International Women’s Day when women unite in the struggle for their rights. This is a day of female solidarity, not bouquets and sweets. The Week of Women’s Solidarity is primarily an educational project, and we are united not against something, but for the development of women, women’s communities and the whole of Ukrainian society

In January 2020, Sharyhina criticized (then) United States Secretary of State Mike Pompeo for visiting Ukraine without meeting LGBTQ community leaders.

Sharyhina has been criticized by Ukrainian nationalists for cooperating with Russian organizations like Russian LGBT Network.

== See also ==
- LGBT rights in Ukraine
