= List of gay, lesbian or bisexual people: G =

This is a partial list of notable people who were or are gay men, lesbian or bisexual.

The historical concept and definition of sexual orientation varies, and has changed greatly over time; for example the general term "gay" wasn't used to describe sexual orientation until the mid 20th century. A number of different classification schemes have been used to describe sexual orientation since the mid-19th century, and scholars have often defined the term "sexual orientation" in divergent ways. Indeed, several studies have found that much of the research about sexual orientation has failed to define the term at all, making it difficult to reconcile the results of different studies. However, most definitions include a psychological component (such as the direction of an individual's erotic desire) and/or a behavioural component (which focuses on the sex of the individual's sexual partner/s). Some prefer simply to follow an individual's self-definition or identity.

The high prevalence of people from the West on this list may be due to societal attitudes towards homosexuality. The Pew Research Center's 2013 Global Attitudes Survey found that there is "greater acceptance in more secular and affluent countries," with "publics in 39 countries [having] broad acceptance of homosexuality in North America, the European Union, and much of Latin America, but equally widespread rejection in predominantly Muslim nations and in Africa, as well as in parts of Asia and in Russia. Opinion about the acceptability of homosexuality is divided in Israel, Poland and Bolivia.” As of 2013, Americans are divided – a majority (60 percent) believes homosexuality should be accepted, while 33 percent disagree.

== G ==
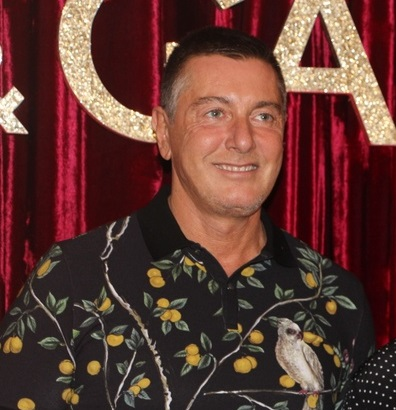
Fashion designer Stefano Gabbana

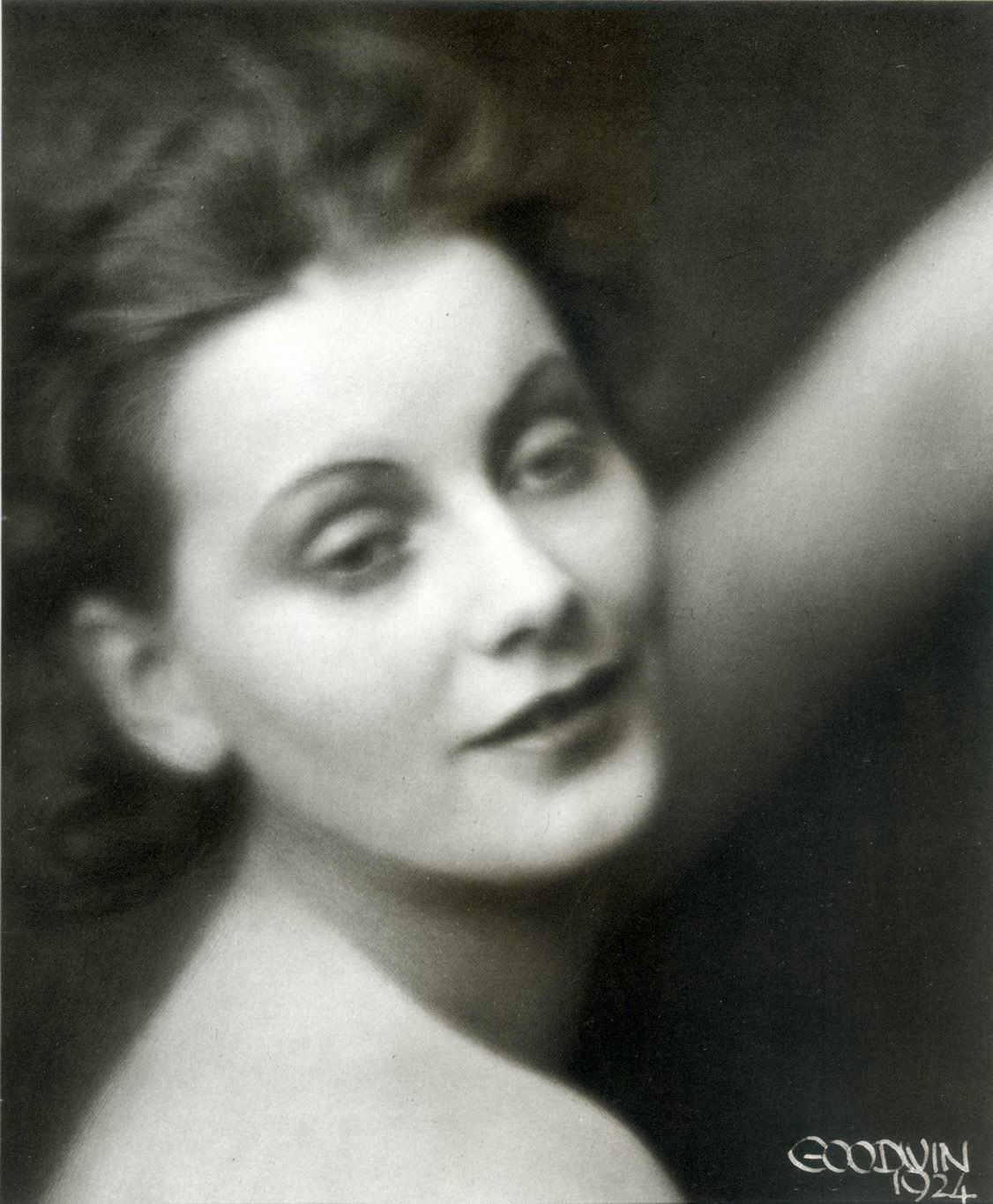
Actor Greta Garbo

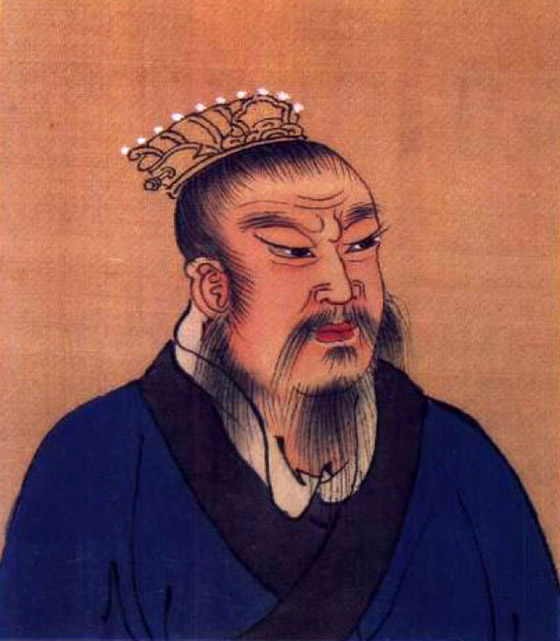
Emperor Gaozu of Han

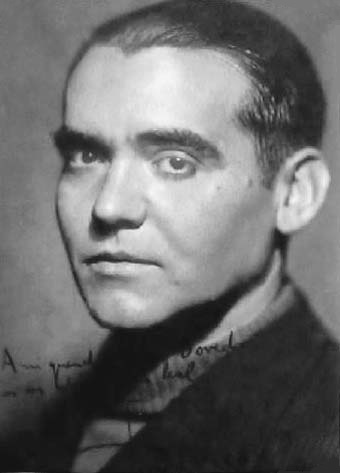
Poet Federico García Lorca

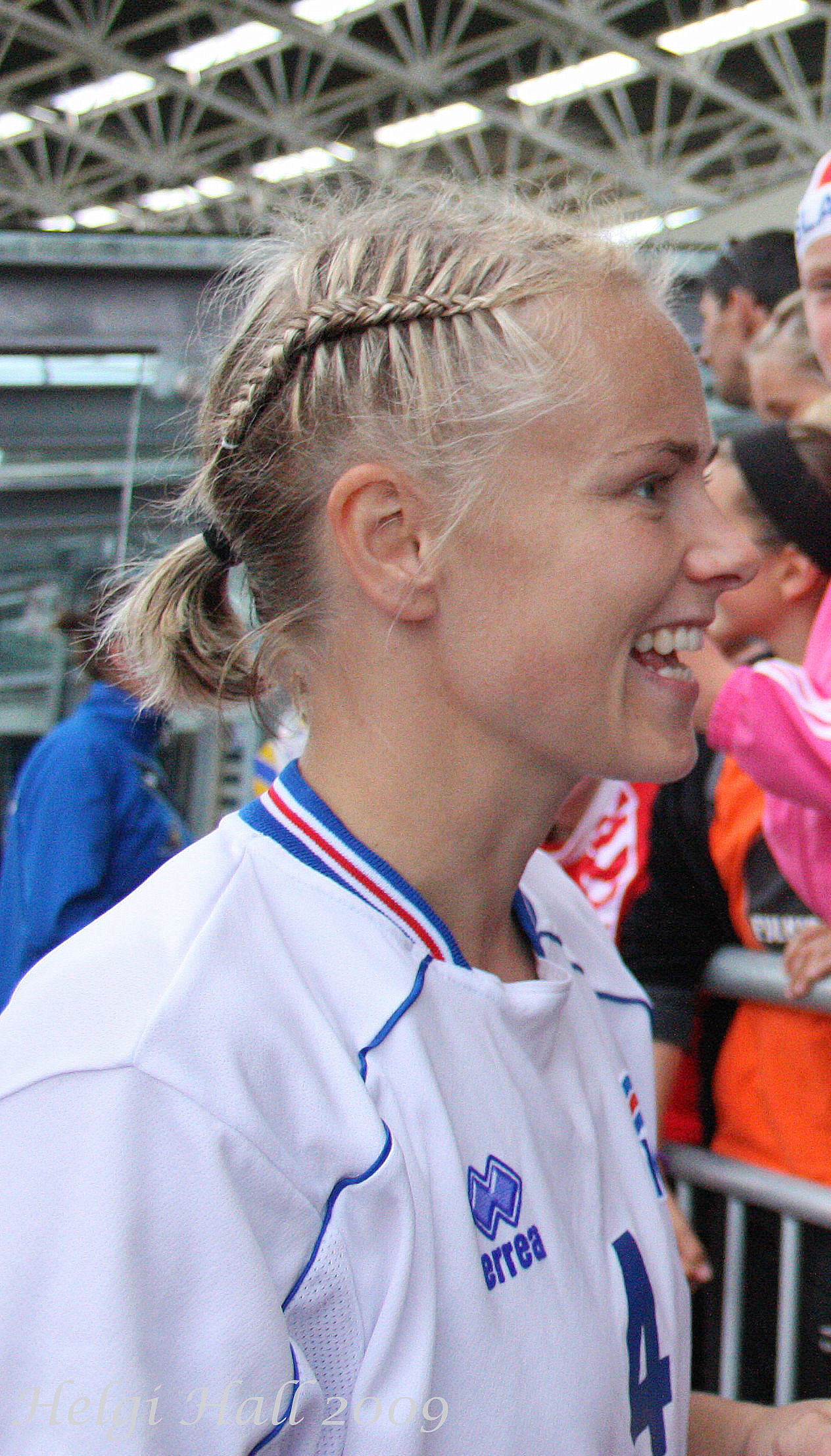
Footballer Edda Garðarsdóttir

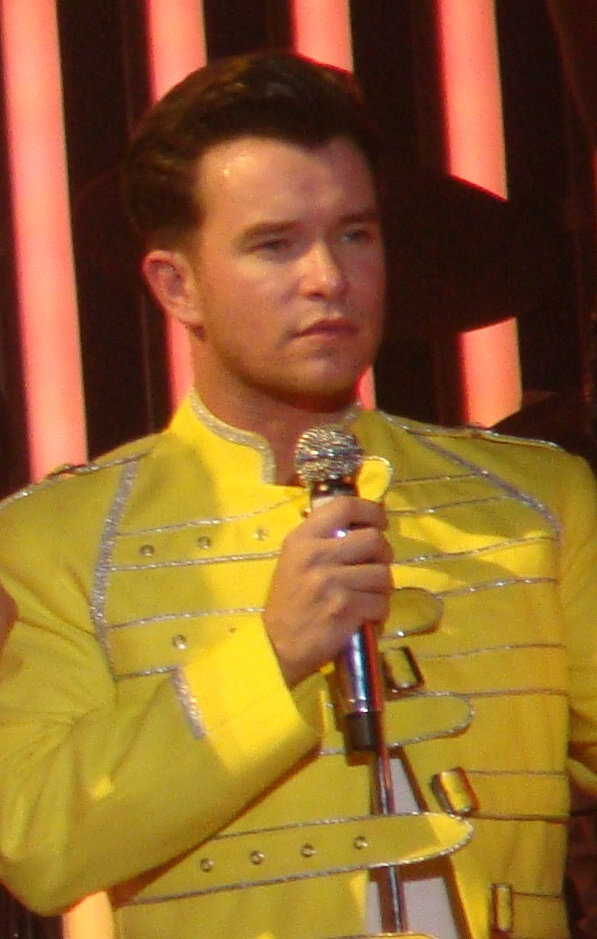
Pop musician Stephen Gately

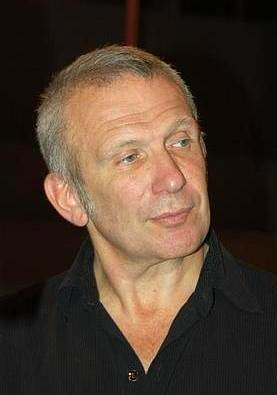
Designer Jean-Paul Gaultier

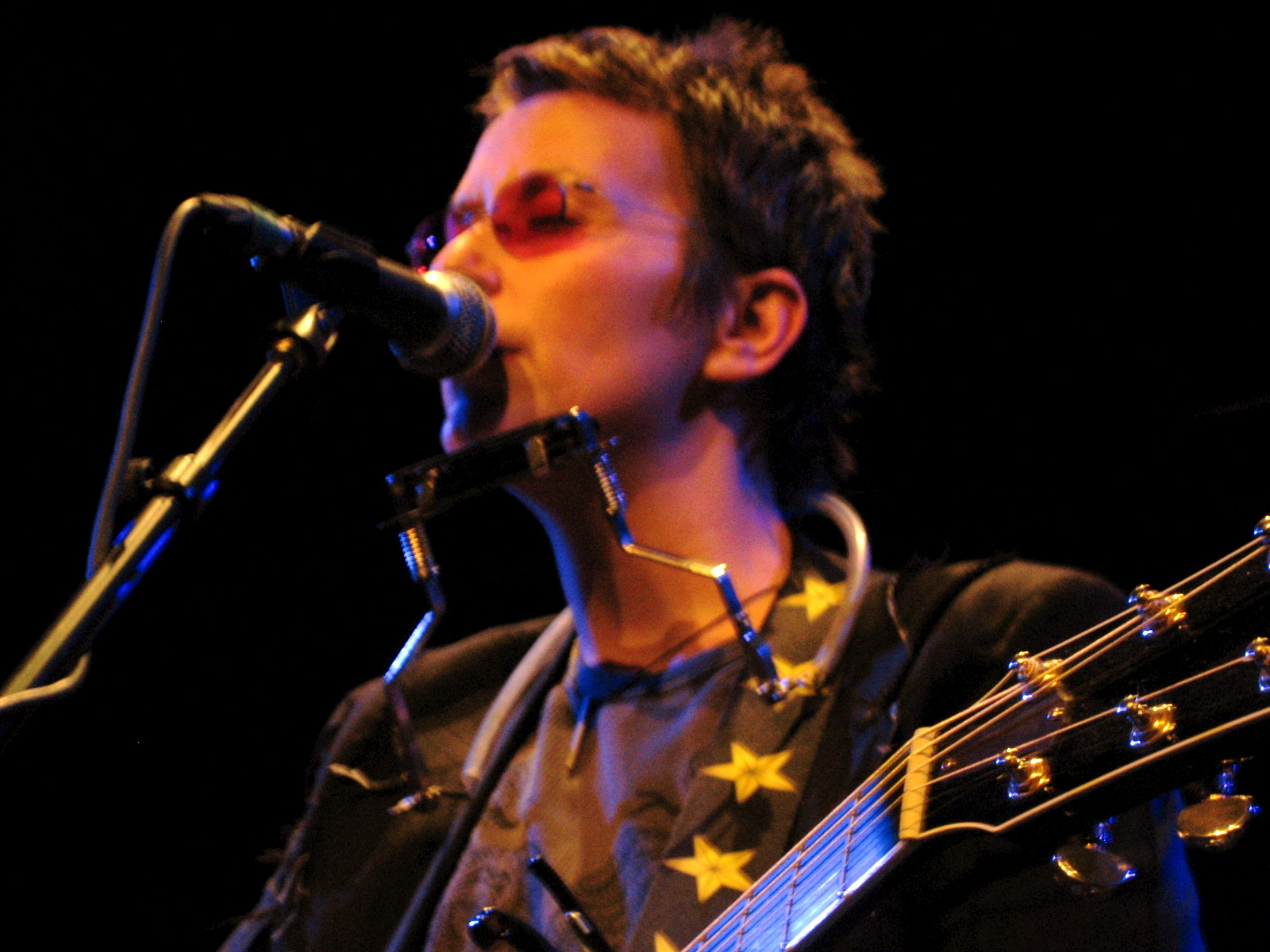
Musician Mary Gauthier

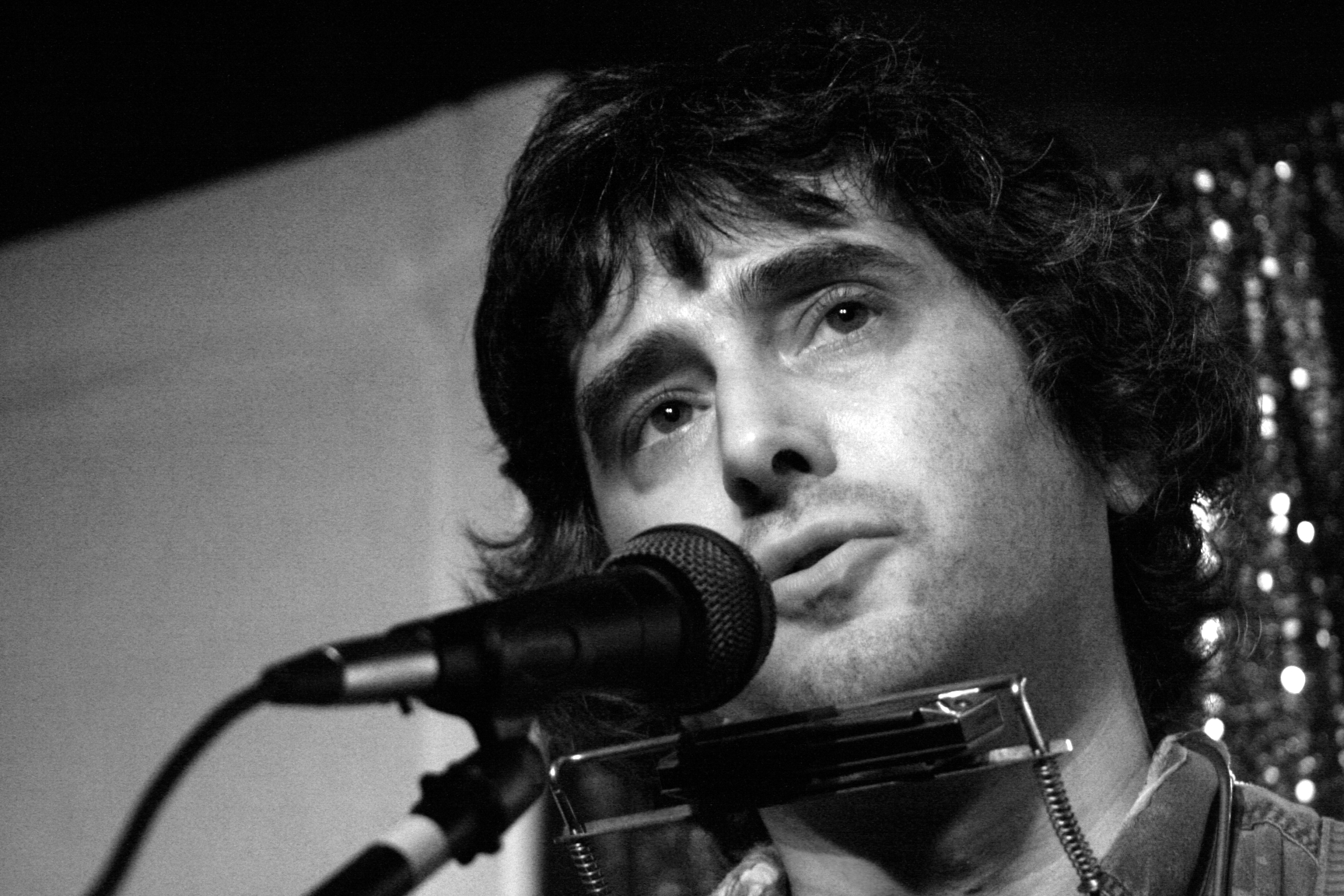
Singer Joe Genaro

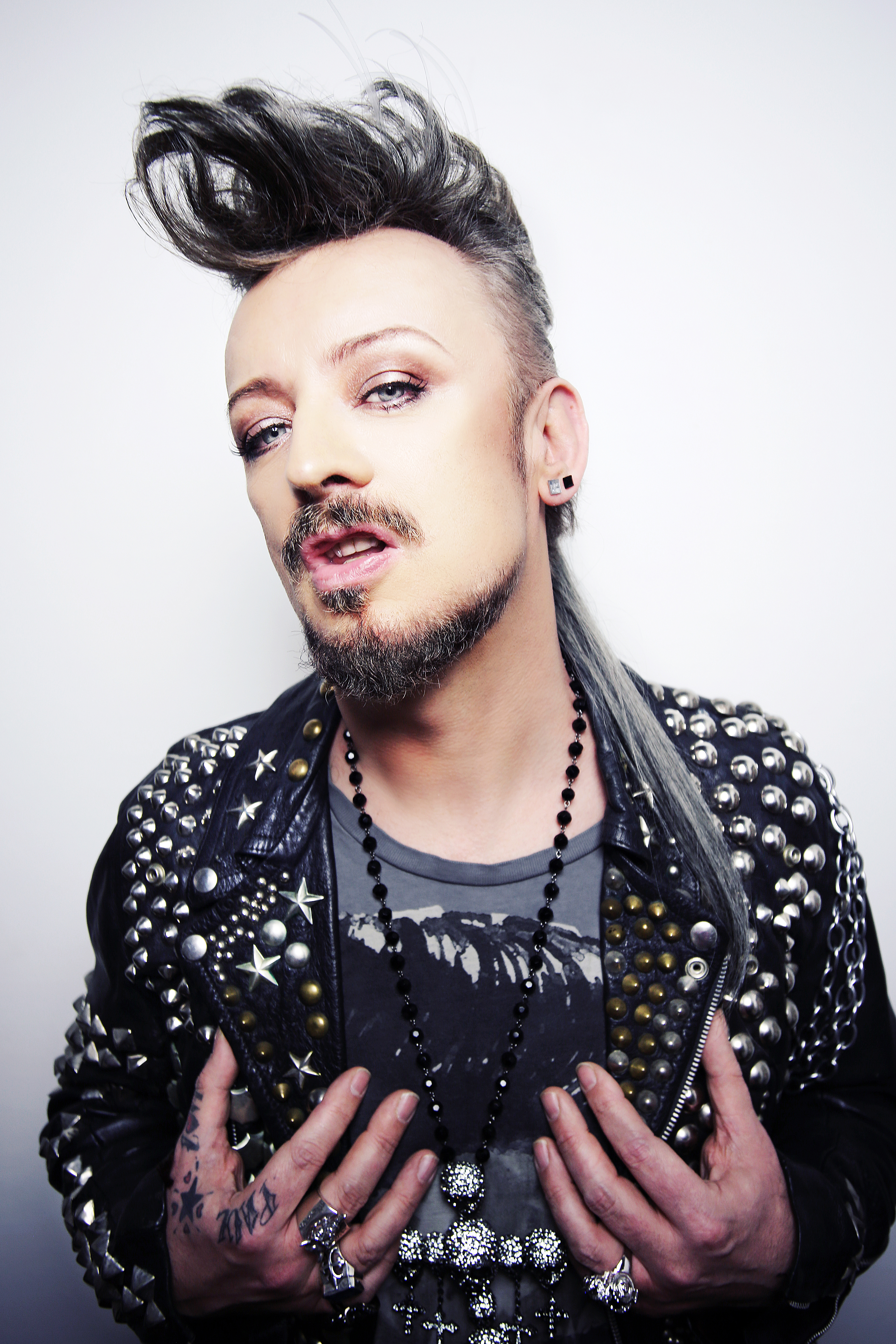
Pop musician Boy George

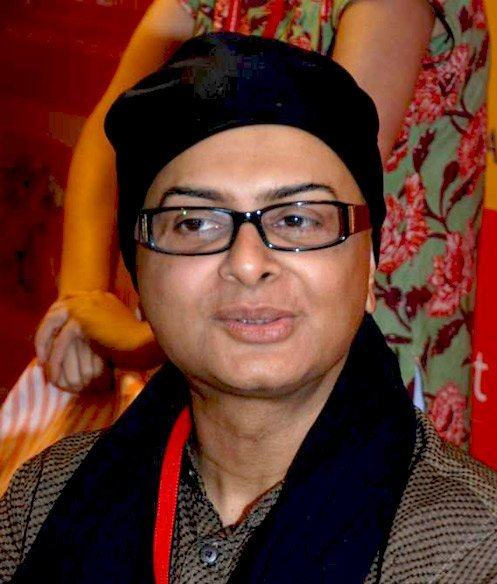
Filmmaker Rituparno Ghosh

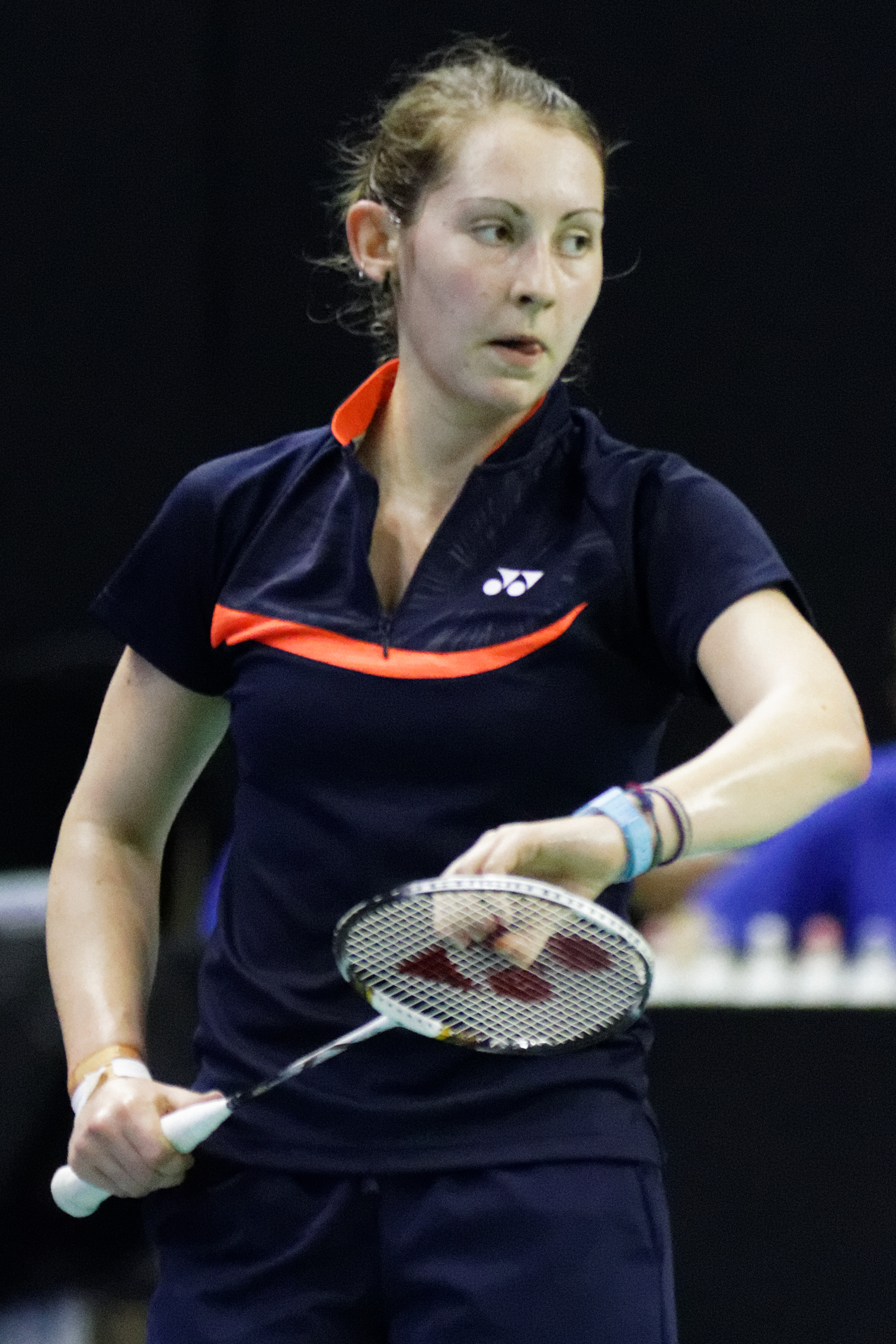
Badminton player Kirsty Gilmour

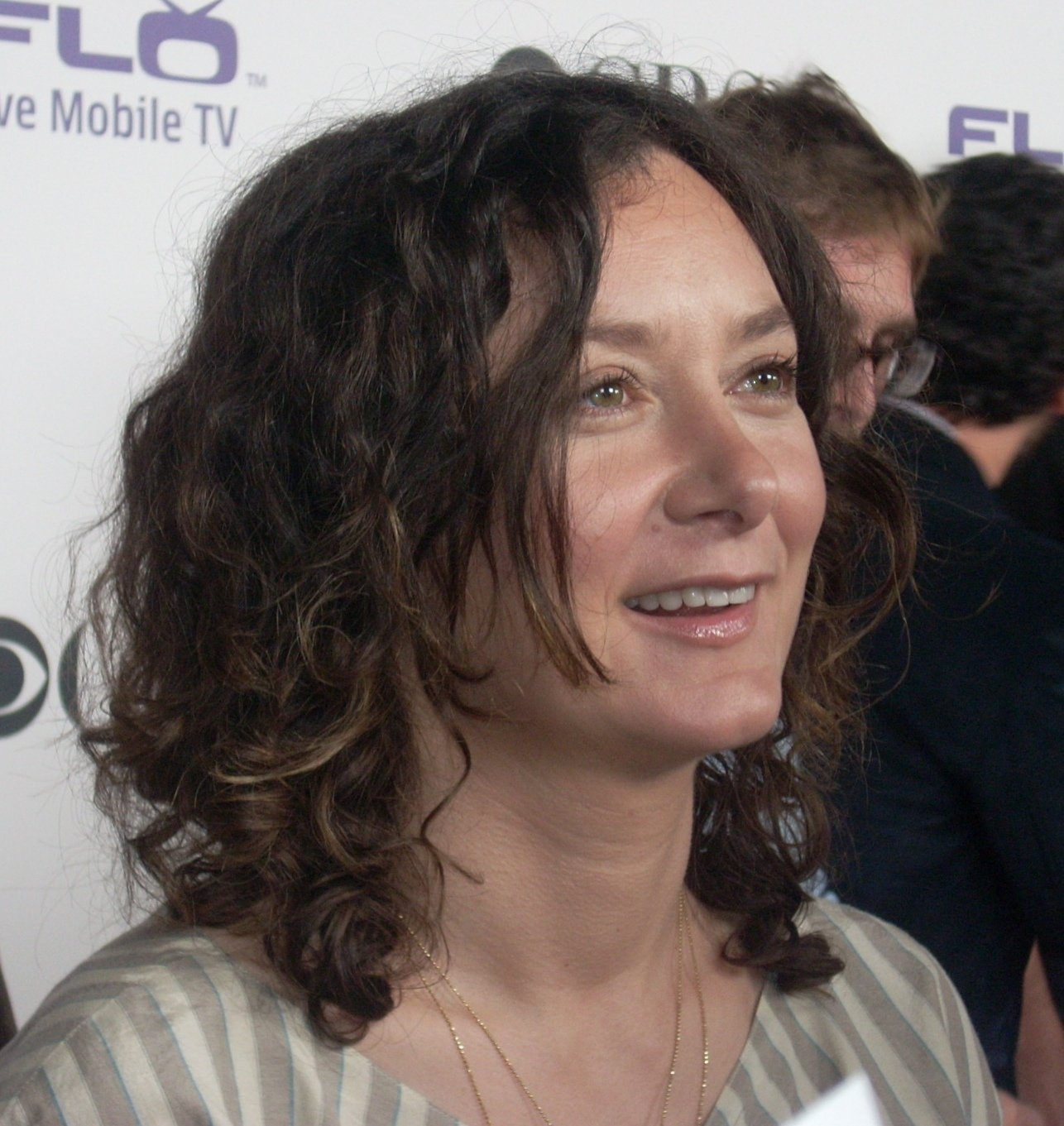
Actor Sara Gilbert

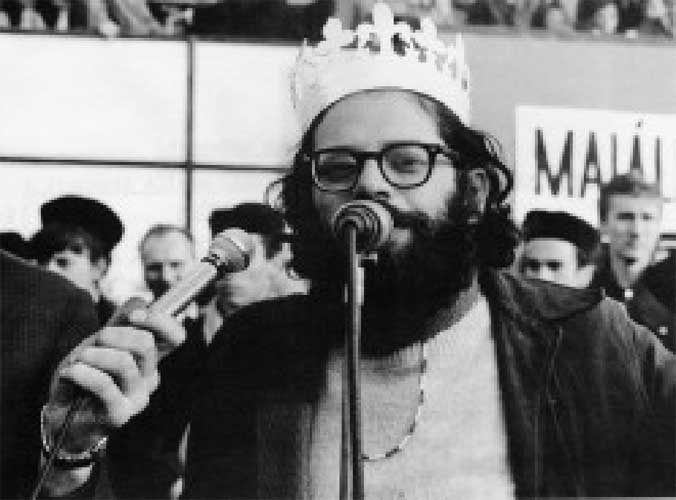
Poet Allen Ginsberg

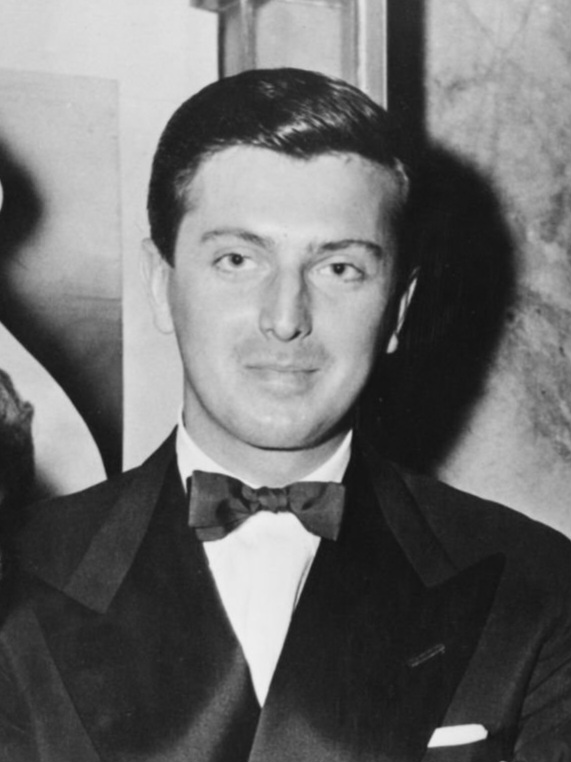
Fashion designer Hubert de Givenchy

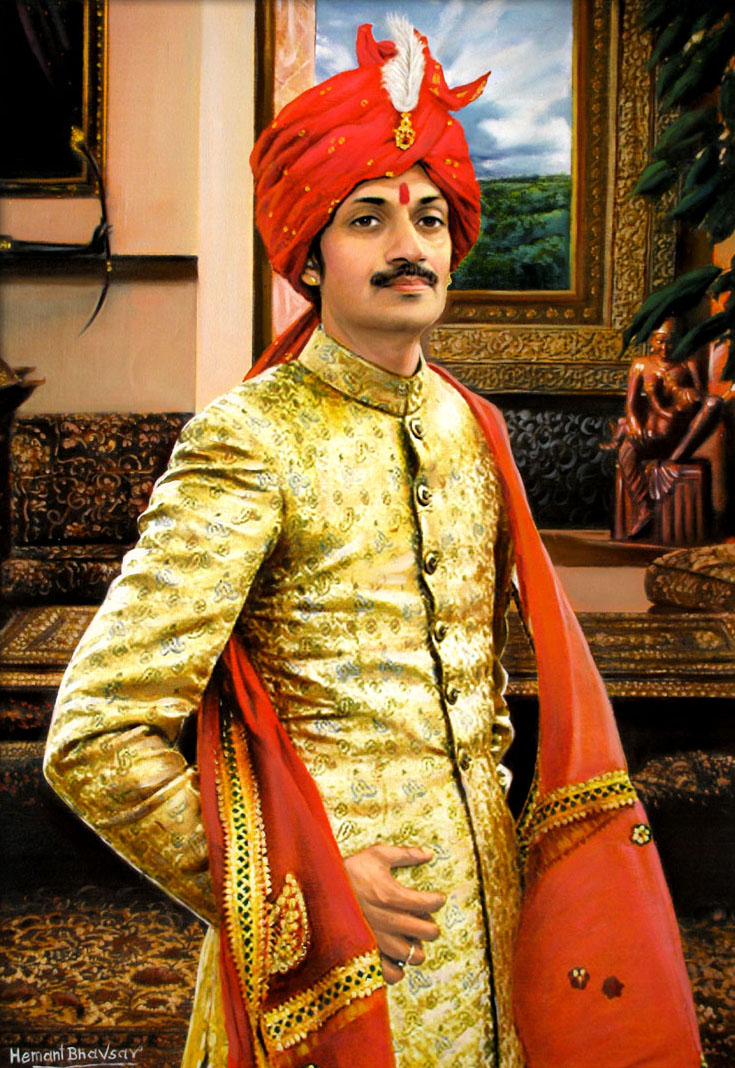
Prince Manvendra Singh Gohil

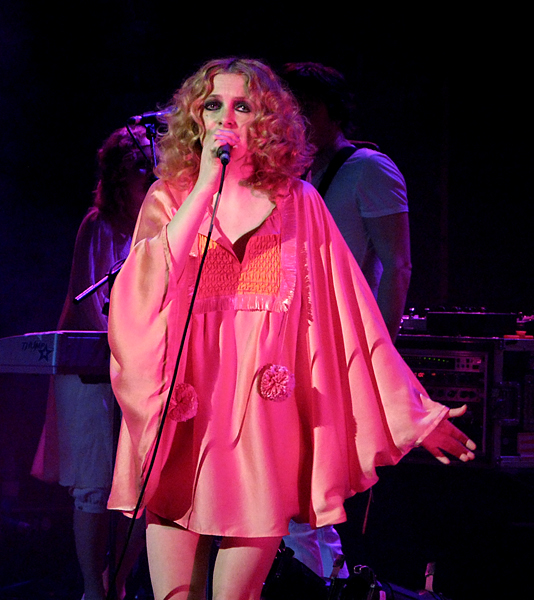
Musician Alison Goldfrapp

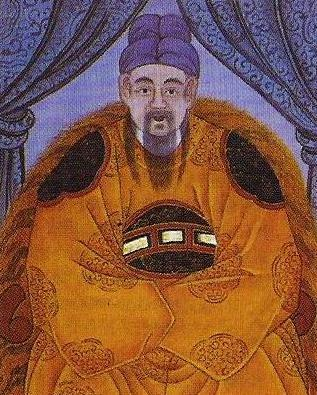
King Gongmin of Goryeo

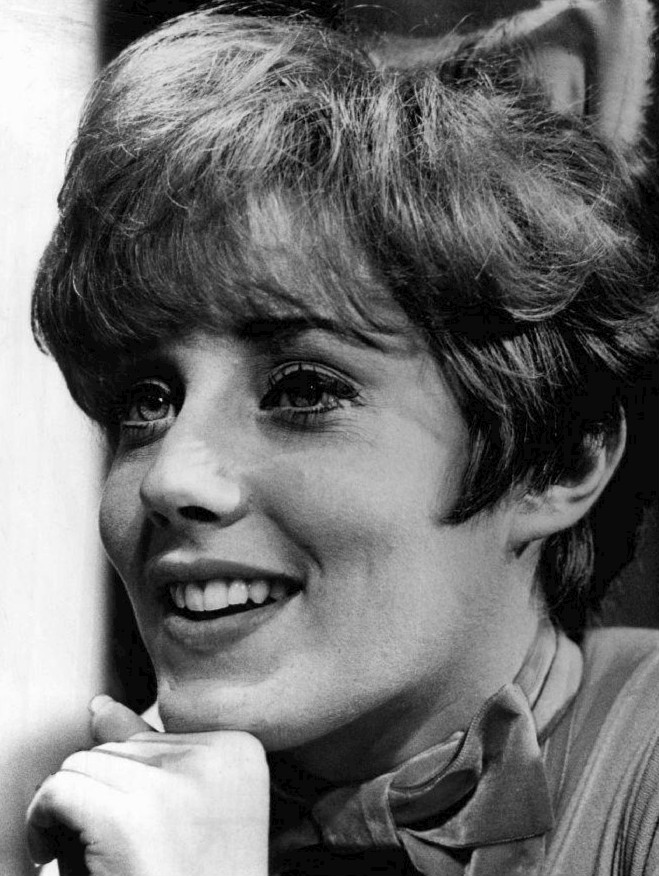
Pop musician Lesley Gore

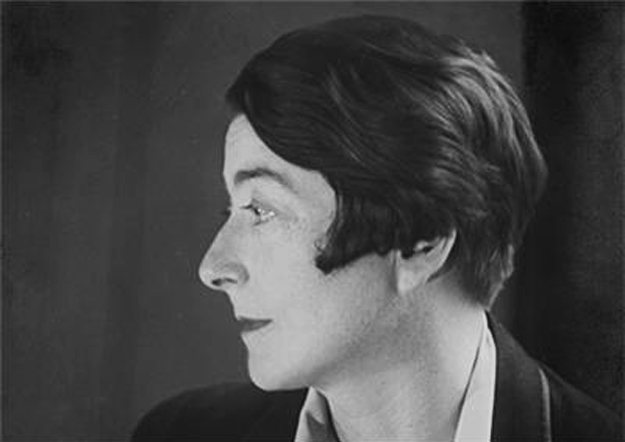
Architect Eileen Gray

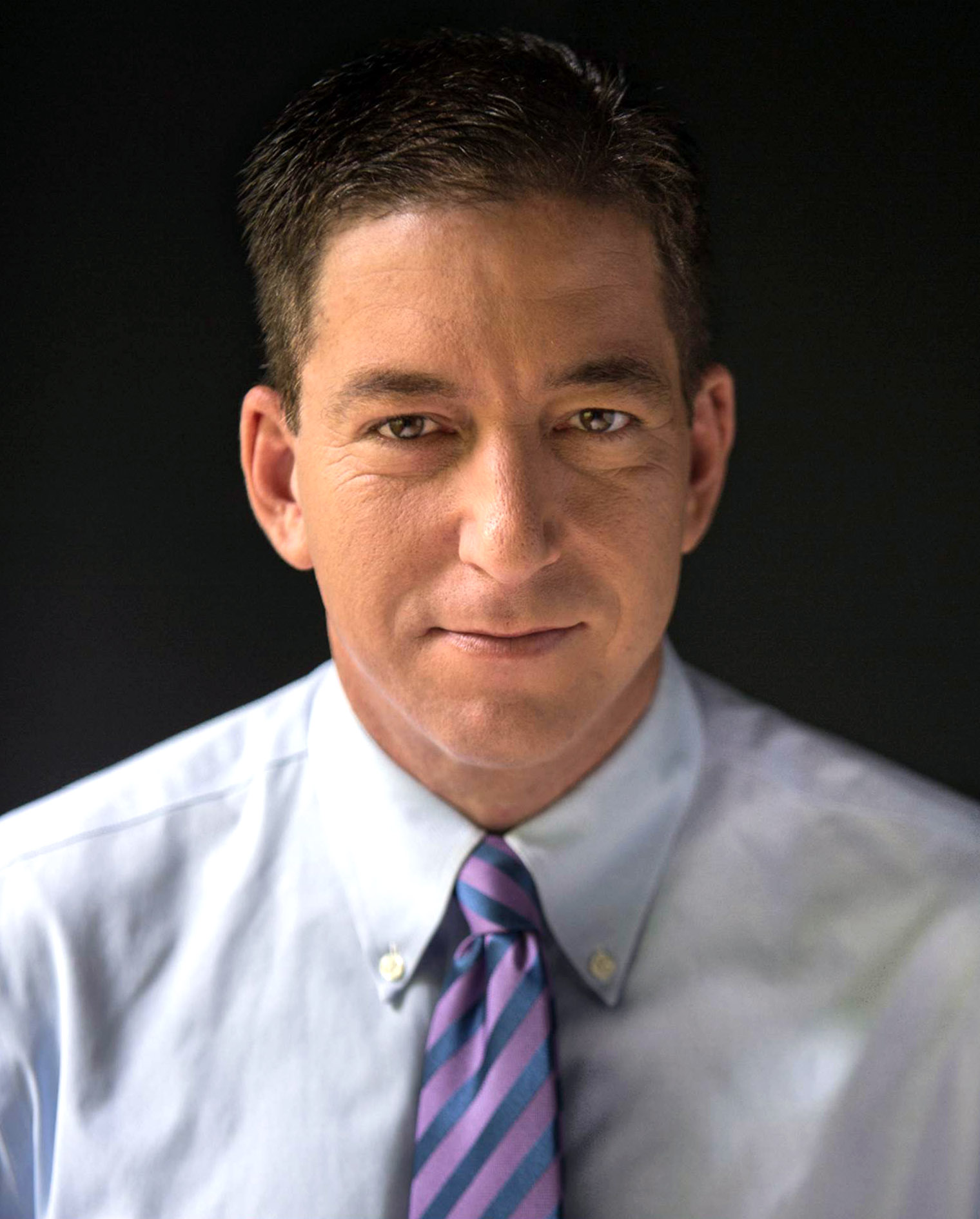
Journalist Glenn Greenwald

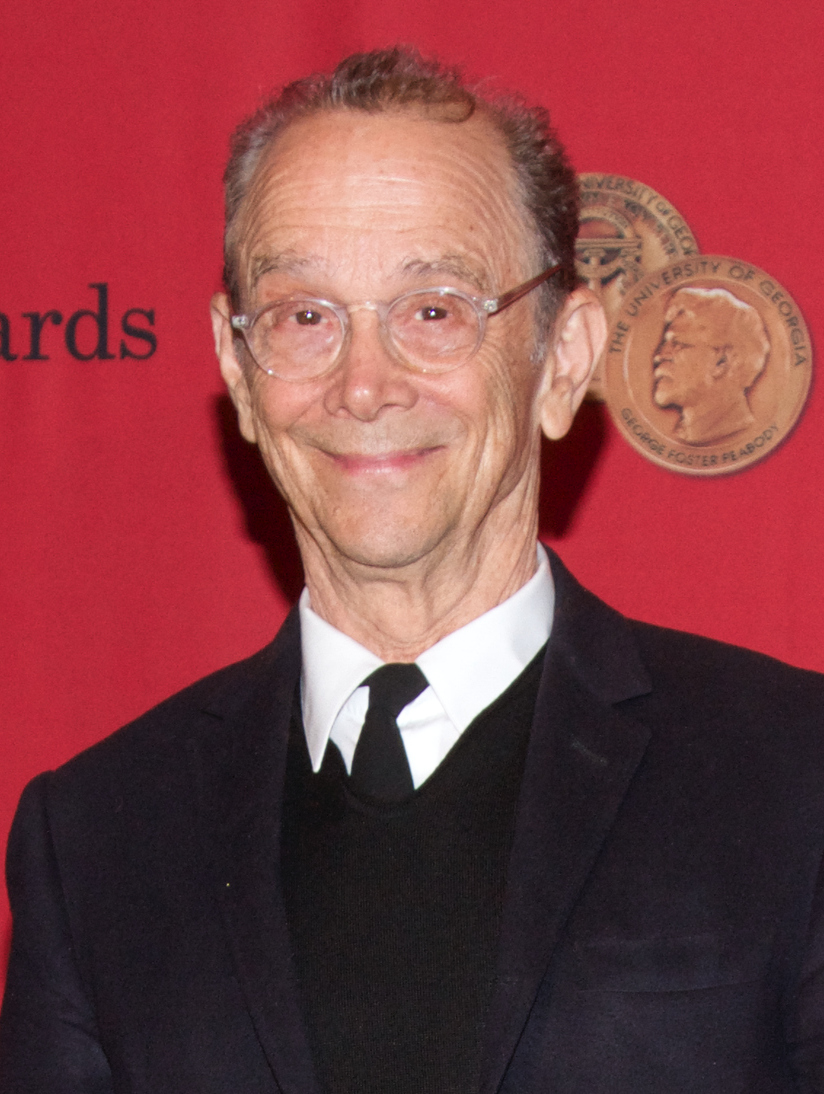
Actor Joel Grey

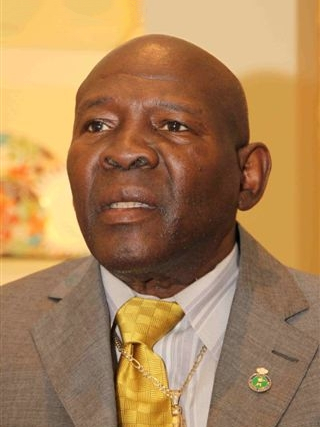
Boxer Emile Griffith

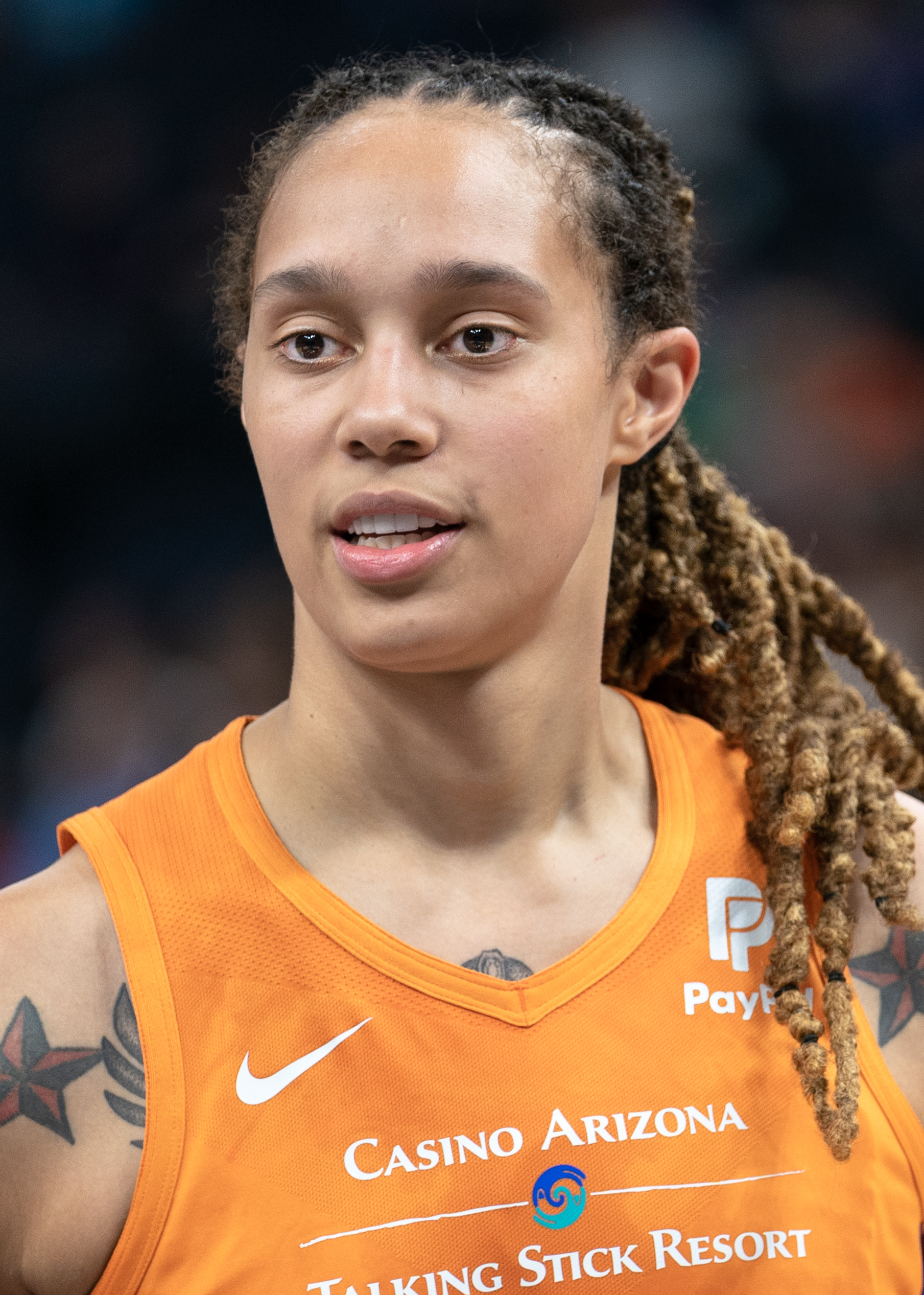
Basketball player Brittney Griner

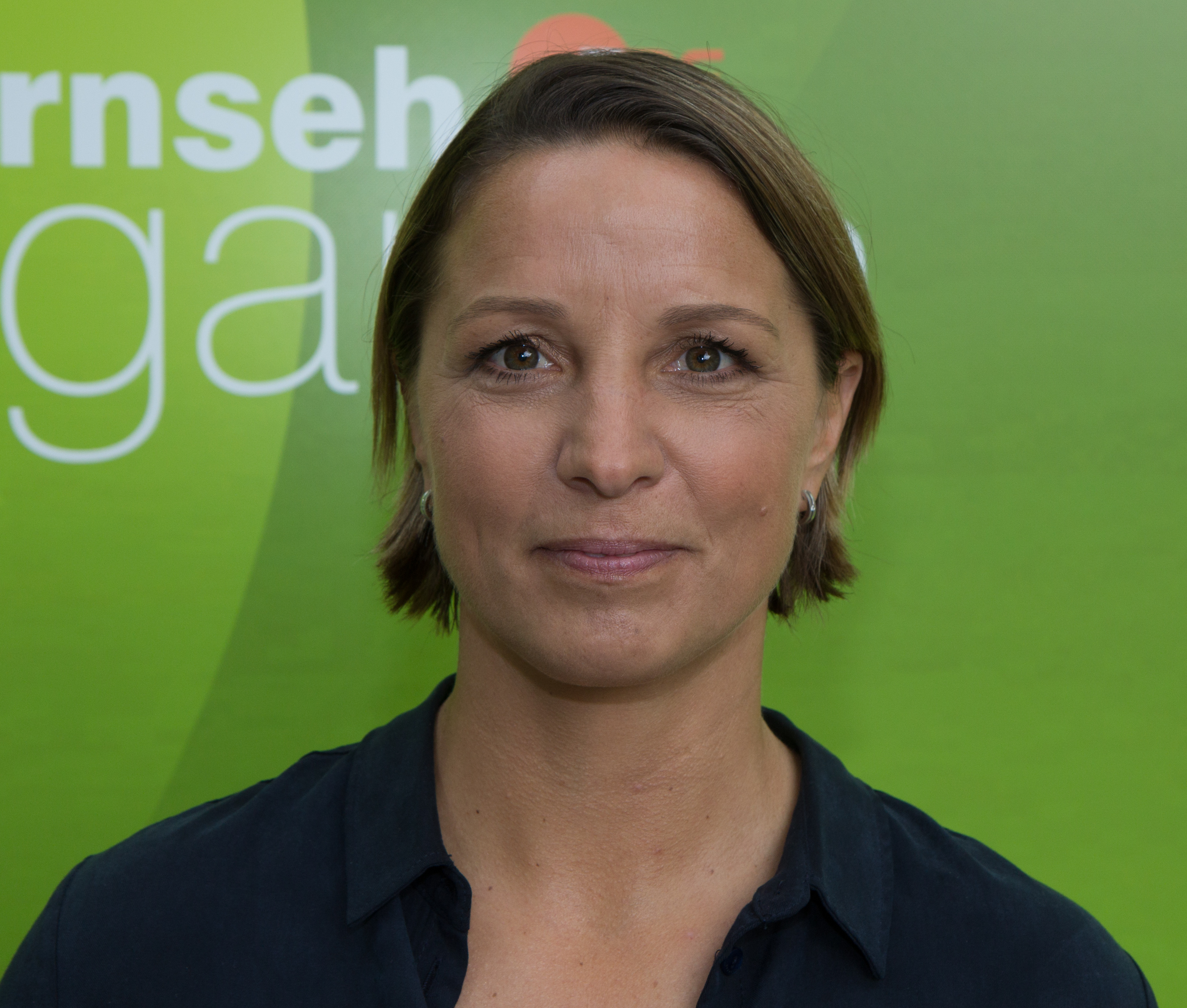
Footballer Inka Grings

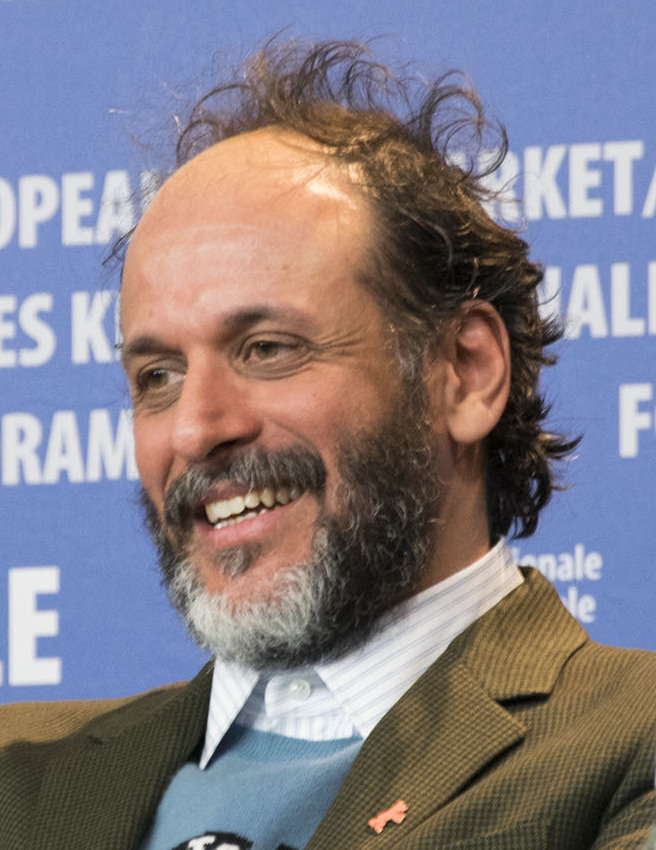
Filmmaker Luca Guadagnino

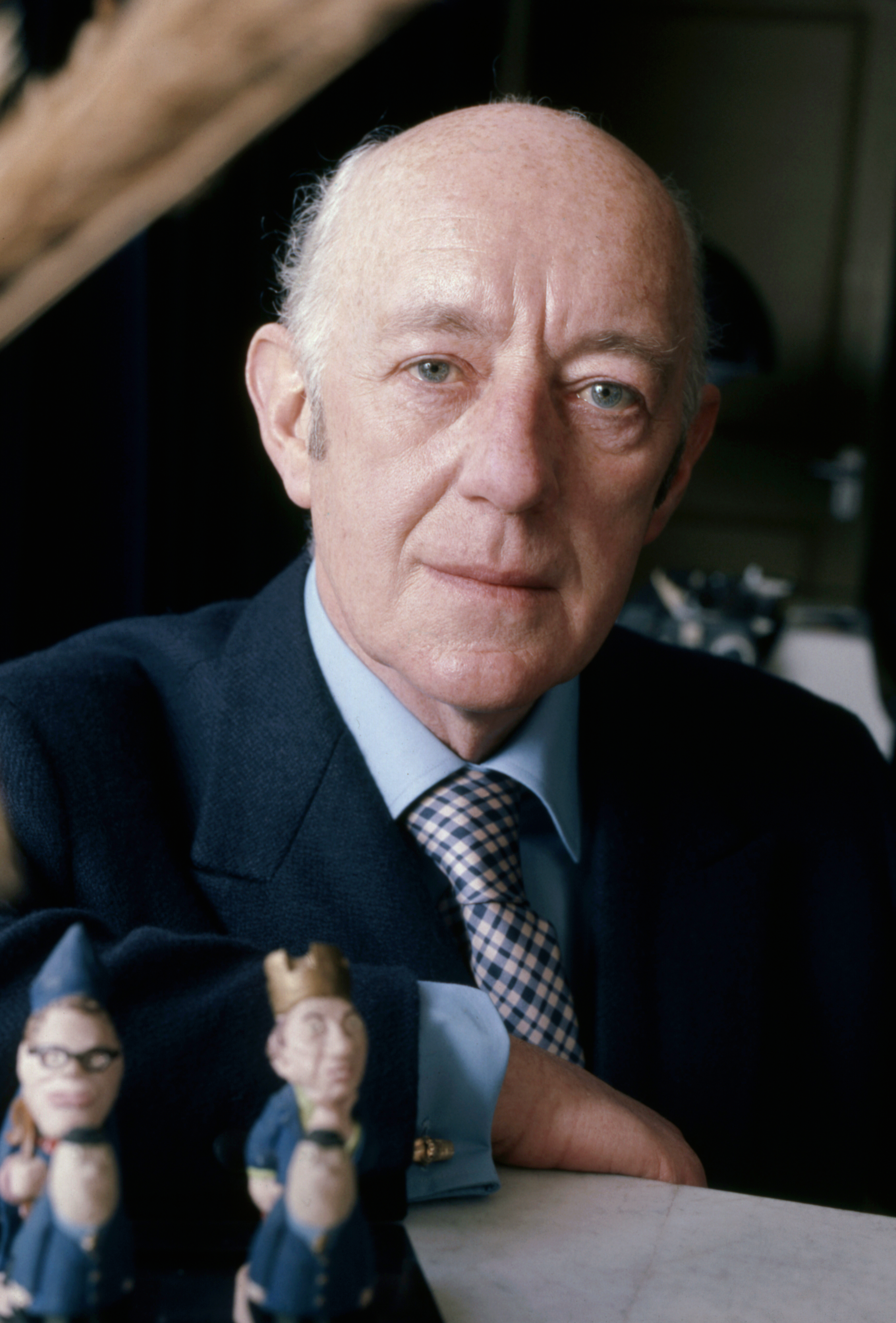
Actor Alec Guinness

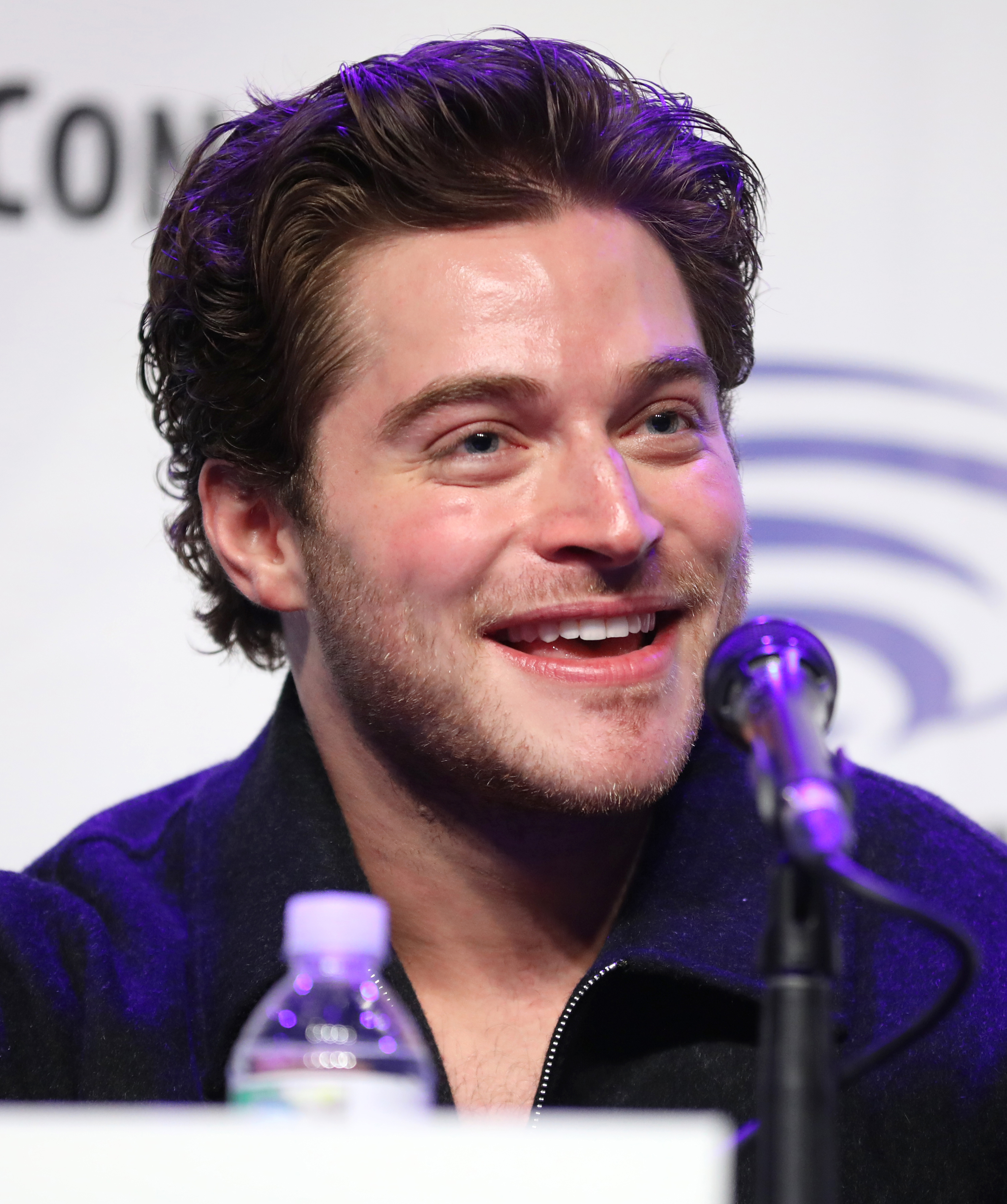
Actor Froy Gutierrez

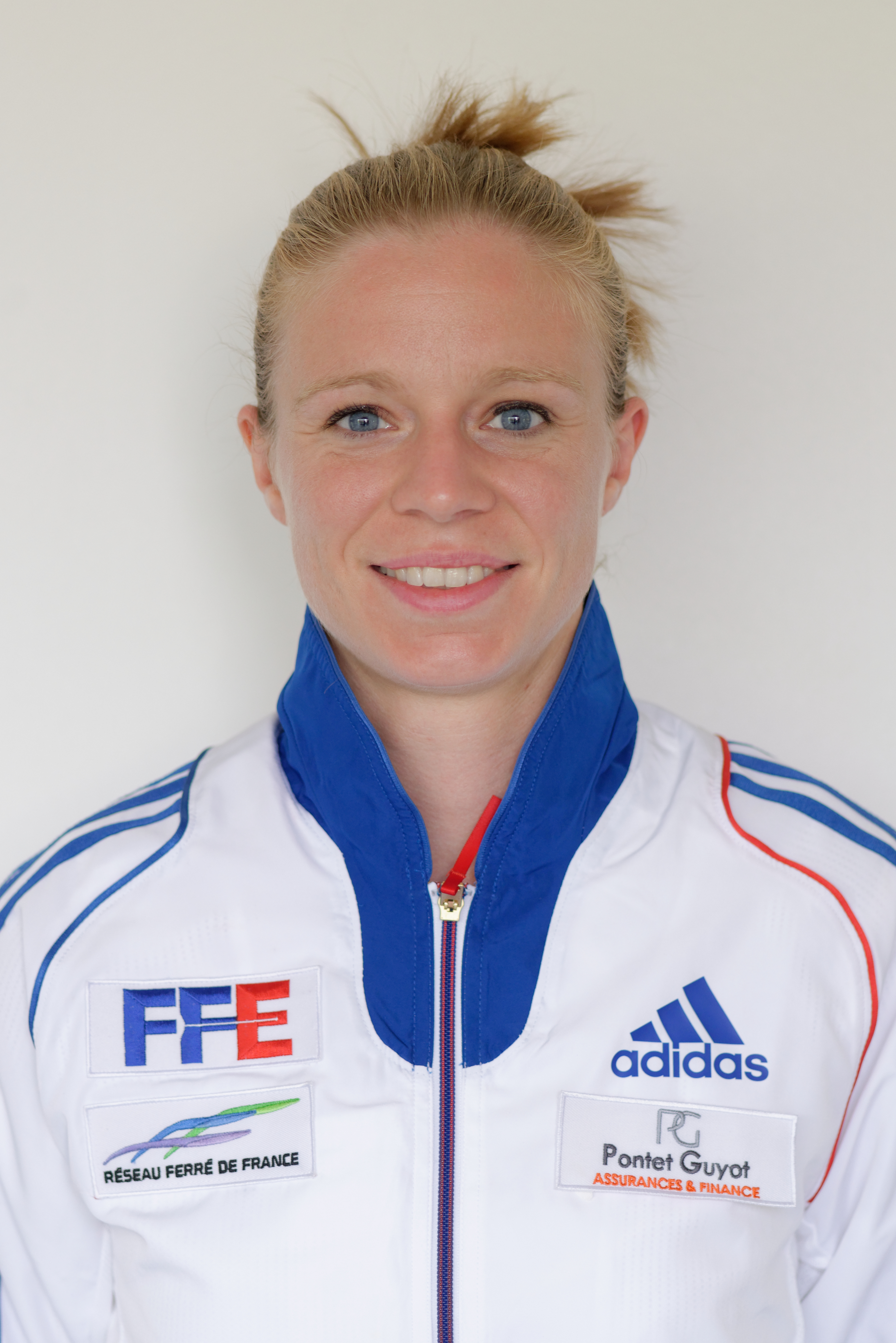
Fencer Astrid Guyart

Name	Lifetime	Nationality	Notable as	Notes
Gaahl	b. 1975	Norwegian	Black Metal vocalist (Gorgoroth)	G
Seth Gaaikema	1939–2014	Dutch	Entertainer, writer	G
Stefano Gabbana	b. 1962	Italian	Fashion designer (Dolce & Gabbana)	G
Davit Gabunia	b. 1982	Georgian	Playwright, translator	G
Hannah Gadsby	b. 1978	Australian	Comedian, writer, actor, TV presenter	L
John Wayne Gacy	1942–1994	American	Serial killer	B
Maria Gadú	b. 1986	Brazilian	Singer, musician	L
Lukas Gage	b. 1995	American	Actor	G
Tracy Gahan	b. 1980	American	Basketball player	L
Edward Gal	b. 1970	Dutch	Dressage rider	G
Antonio Gala	1930–2023	Spanish	Poet, playwright, novelist, writer	B
París Galán	b. 1968	Bolivian	Drag queen, LGBT rights activist, politician	G
Frank Galati	1943–2023	American	Writer, director, actor	G
Patrick Gale	b. 1962	English	Author	G
Cathleen Galgiani	b. 1964	American	Politician	L
Erzsébet Galgóczi	1930–1989	Hungarian	Playwright, screenwriter	L
Damon Galgut	b. 1963	South African	Playwright, novelist	G
Paolo Galimberti	b. 1968	Italian	Politician, entrepreneur	G
María Galindo	b. 1964	Bolivian	Psychologist, feminist, radio presenter, TV presenter, writer	L
Rudy Galindo	b. 1969	American	Figure skater	G
Vicky Galindo	b. 1983	American	Softball player, coach	B
Anya Gallaccio	b. 1963	Scottish	Artist	L
Ed Gallagher	1957–2005	American	Football player	G
Tom Gallagher	1940–2018	American	Diplomat and 1st officer of the U.S. Foreign Service to come out as gay	G
Simon Gallaher	b. 1958	Australian	Artist	B
John Galliano	b. 1960	Gibraltarian-British	Fashion designer	G
Steve Galluccio	b. 1960	Canadian	Screenwriter	G
Ron Galperin	b. 1963	American	Politician, lawyer	G
Noah Galvin	b. 1994	American	Actor, singer	G
Jeanne Galzy	1883–1977	French	Author	L
Paul Gambaccini	b. 1949	British-American	Radio and TV presenter	G
Facundo Gambandé	b. 1990	Argentine	Actor, singer	G
Philip Gambone	b. 1948	American	Writer	G
McCrae Game	b. ?	American	Former conversion therapy founder	G
Herbert Ganado	1906–1979	Maltese	Politician	G
Nisha Ganatra	b. 1974	Canadian	Director, actor	L
Vice Ganda	b. 1976	Filipino	Actor, comedian, TV host, recording artist	G
Jeff Gannon	b. 1958	American	Columnist	B
Will Ganss	b. 1992	American	Broadcast journalist	G
Robert Gant	b. 1968	American	Actor	G
Emperor Gaozu of Han	c. 256–195 BC	Chinese (Han Dynasty)	Head of state	B
Victor Garber	b. 1949	Canadian	Actor	G
Greta Garbo	1905–1990	Swedish	Actor	L or B
Angelo Garcia	b. 1976	American	Pop singer (Menudo)	G
Edênia Garcia	b. 1987	Brazilian	Para swimmer	L
Kany García	b. 1982	Puerto Rican	Pop singer, musician	L
Lambda Garcia	b. 1987	Mexican	Actor	G
Leo García	b. 1970	Argentine	Pop singer	G
Robert Garcia	b. 1977	Peruvian-American	Politician	G
Federico García Lorca	1898–1936	Spanish	Poet, dramatist	G
Edda Garðarsdóttir	b. 1979	Icelandic	Footballer. coach	L
Jonas Gardell	b. 1963	Swedish	Author, playwright, comedian	G
Jason Gardiner	b. 1971	Australian	Choreographer, singer, theatre producer	G
Randy Gardner	b. 1958	American	Figure skater	G
Heiner Garg	b. 1966	German	Politician	G
Gabriel Garko	b. 1972	Italian	Model, actor	B
Ante Garmaz	1928–2011	Argentine	Actor, fashion designer, model	G
Chris Garneau	b. 1982	American	Singer-songwriter	G
Randall Garrison	b. 1951	Canadian	Politician	G
Sam Garrison	1942–2007	American	Lawyer, defended Nixon during impeachment trial	G
Vasil Garvanliev	b. 1984	Macedonian	Singer	G
Krzysztof Garwatowski	b. 1967	Polish	LGBT activist, journalist, publisher	G
Alicia Garza	b. 1981	American	Activist, co-founder of Black Lives Matter	L
Anders Gåsland	b. 1968	Norwegian	Politician	G
Alicia Gaspar de Alba	b. 1958	American	Writer	L
Gian Gastone de' Medici	1671–1737	Italian	Grand Duke of Tuscany	G
Stephen Gately	1976–2009	Irish	Pop musician (Boyzone), actor	G
Mark Gatiss	b. 1966	English	Actor, writer	G
Carol Gattaz	b. 1981	Brazilian	Volleyball player	L
Sylvain Gaudreault	b. 1970	Canadian	Politician	G
Jean-Paul Gaultier	b. 1952	French	Fashion designer	G
Kerry Gauthier	b. 1955	American	Politician	G
Mary Gauthier	b. 1962	American	Singer, songwriter	L
Jordan Gavaris	b. 1989	Canadian	Actor	G
Roxane Gay	b. 1974	American	Writer, editor, professor, social commenter	B
Darrin P. Gayles	b. 1966	American	Judge of the United States District Court	G
Jane Geddes	b. 1960	American	Golfer	L
Megan Rose Gedris	b. 1986	American	Comic artist, writer	L
Vera Gedroits	1876–1932	Russian	Surgeon, poet	L
Will Geer	1902–1978	American	Actor, musician, social activist	B
Nathalie Geeris	b. 1971	Dutch	Footballer	L
David Geffen	b. 1943	American	Record executive	G
Kai Gehring	b. 1977	German	Politician	G
Chris Geidner	b. ?	American	Journalist	G
Ian Gelder	b. 1949	English	Actor	G
Henry Geldzahler	1935–1994	Belgian-American	Art curator	G
Raja Gemini	b. 1974	American	Drag performer, makeup artist	G
Rigel Gemini	b. 1988	American	Music artist	G
Joe Genaro	b. 1962	American	Singer, punk rock musician (Dead Milkmen)	G
Alan Gendreau	b. 1989	American	Football player	G
Jean Genet	1910–1986	French	Playwright, political activist	G
Hiraga Gennai	c.1729–779 or 1780	Japanese	Polymath, physician, author, painter, inventor	G
Kitty Genovese	1935–1964	American	Murder victim	L
Gentleman Reg	b. ?	Canadian	Singer-songwriter	G
Prince George of Greece and Denmark	1869–1957	Greek	Noble, High commissioner of the Cretan State	G
Boy George	b. 1961	English	Pop musician (Culture Club)	G
Mat George	1995–2021	American	Podcast host	G
Regina George	b. 1991	Nigerian-American	Sprinter	L
Stefan George	1868–1933	German	Poet	G
Nicole Georges	b. 1981	American	Illustrator, zinester, educator	L
Adam Georgiev	b. 1980	Czech	Poet	G
Chrissy Gephardt	b. ?	American	Activist	L
Raphaël Gérard	b. 1968	French	Politician	G
Henry Gerber	1892–1972	German-American	Gay rights activist	G
András Gerevich	b. 1976	Hungarian	Poet, screenwriter, professor, literary translator	G
Karl Gerhard	1891–1964	Swedish	Singer, actor, songwriter, revue writer	G
Sven Gerich	b. 1974	German	Politician	G
Rudi Gernreich	1922–1985	Austrian-American	Fashion designer, founding member of the Mattachine Society	G
David Gerrold	b. 1944	American	Science fiction writer	G
Uri Gershuni	b. 1970	Israeli	Photographer, educator	G
Masha Gessen	b. 1967	Russian-American	Journalist, author, activist	L
Malcolm Gets	b. 1963	American	Actor	G
August Getty	b. 1994	American	Fashion designer	G
Nats Getty	b. 1992	American	Model, socialite, designer, artist, LGBTQ rights activist	L
Henri Ghéon	1875–1944	French	Playwright, novelist, poet, critic	G
Nicolas Ghesquière	b. 1971	French	Fashion designer	G
Rituparno Ghosh	1963–2013	Indian	Filmmaker, actor	G
Hyeong-do Gi	1960–1989	Korean	Poet	G
Constantine Giannaris	b. 1959	Greek	Filmmaker	G
Robert Giard	1939–2002	American	Photographer	G
Joel Gibb	b. 1977	Canadian	Folk-rock musician (The Hidden Cameras)	G
Nick Gibb	b. 1960	English	Politician	G
Christopher Gibbs	1938–2018	English	Antiques dealer and collector	G
Jonica T. Gibbs	b. ?	American	Actor, comedian	L
Andrea Gibson	1975–2025	American	Poet, activist	L
André Gide	1869–1951	French	Author, Nobel prize winner	G
Elsa Gidlow	1898–1986	British-Canadian-American	Poet, journalist, philosopher, humanitarian	L
John Gielgud	1904–2000	English	Actor	G
Godehard Giese	b. 1972	German	Actor	G
Karl Giese	1898–1938	German	Archivist, museum curator, partner of Magnus Hirschfeld	G
Rufus Gifford	b. 1974	American	Former ambassador and congressional candidate	G
Elizabeth Gilbert	b. 1969	American	Writer	B
Sara Gilbert	b. 1975	American	Actor	L
Jaime Gil de Biedma	1929–1990	Spanish	Poet	G
Virginia "Ginny" Gilder	b. 1958	American	Rower	L
Nikita Gill	b. ?	British–Indian	Poet, writer	B
Peter Gill	b. 1939	Welsh	Playwright	G
Thea Gill	b. 1970	Canadian	Actor	B
Tim Gill	b. 1953	American	Software entrepreneur, LGBT rights activist	G
Kayne Gillaspie	b. 1979	American	Fashion designer	G
Christopher Gillis	1951–1993	Canadian	Dancer, choreographer	G
Dan Gillespie Sells	b. 1979	English	Rock musician (The Feeling)	G
Ann Louise Gilligan	1945–2017	Irish	Theologian	L
Andrew Gillum	b. 1979	American	Politician	B
Billy Gilman	b. 1988	American	Country singer and activist	G
Elka Gilmore	1960–2019	American	Chef	L
Kirsty Gilmour	b. 1993	Scottish	Badminton player	L
Laura Gilpin	1891–1979	American	Photographer	L
Beatriz Gimeno	b, 1962	Spanish	Politician, LGBT rights activist	L
Mike Gin	b. ?	American	Former mayor of Redondo Beach, California	G
Joann Ginal	b. ?	American	Politician	L
Rolf Gindorf	1939–2016	German	Sexologist	G
Candace Gingrich	b. 1966	American	LGBT rights activist	L
Jon Ginoli	b. 1959	American	Rock musician (Pansy Division)	G
Allen Ginsberg	1926–1997	American	Poet	G
Eitan Ginzburg	b. 1977	Israeli	Politician	G
John Giorno	b. 1936	American	Poet, performance artist	G
Giovanni di Giovanni	1350–1365	Italian	Hate crime victim	G
Nikki Giovanni	1943–2024	American	Poet, writer, activist	L
Missy Giove	b. 1972	American	Professional mountain biker	L
Joël Giraud	b. 1959	French	Politician	G
Barbara Gittings	1932–2007	American	Gay rights activist	L
Hubert de Givenchy	1927–2018	French	Fashion designer	G
Joseph Glasco	1925–1996	American	Painter, sculptor	G
Chris Glaser	b. 1977	American	Christian minister, activist, author	G
Sherry Glaser	b. 1960	American	Activist, actor	L
Gerald Glaskin	1923–2000	Australian	Writer	G
Todd Glass	b. 1964	American	Stand-up comedian	G
Mary Glasspool	b. 1954	American	1st openly lesbian bishop ordained by the Episcopal Church of the United States	L
Thomas Glave	b. 1964	American	Writer, essayist, professor	G
Amber Glenn	b. 1999	American	Figure skater	B
Tyler Glenn	b. 1983	American	Musician, vocalist (Neon Trees)	G
James Gleeson	1915–2008	Australian	Painter	G
Deborah J. Glick	b. 1950	American	Politician	L
Gideon Glick	b. 1988	American	Actor	G
Bogdan Globa	b. 1988	Ukrainian	LGBT rights activist	G
Wilhelm von Gloeden	1856–1931	German	Photographer	G
Todd Gloria	b. 1978	American	Politician	G
John Glover	b. 1944	American	Actor	G
Gluck	1895–1978	English	Painter	L
Bob Glück	b. 1947	American	Poet, fiction writer, editor, co-founder of the New Narrative Movement	G
Connie Glynn	b. 1994	English	Author, YouTuber	B, A
Moud Goba	b. ?	Zimbabwean	LGBTIQ+ activist	L
Hilda Gobbi	1913–1998	Hungarian	Actor	L
Aldis Gobzems	b. 1978	Latvian	Politician	G
God-Des and She (duo)	b. ?	American	Hip-hop duo	L
Linsey Godfrey	b. 1988	American	Actor	B
Adam Godley	b. 1964	English	Actor	G
Glen Goei	b. 1962	Singaporean	Film and theatre director	G
Karel Goeyvaerts	1923–1993	Belgian	Composer	G
Bruce Goff	1904–1982	American	Architect	G
Michael Goff	b. ?	American	Publisher, founder of Out Magazine	G
Theresa Goh	b. 1987	Singaporean	Paralympic swimmer	L
Manvendra Singh Gohil	b. 1965	Indian	Prince of Rajpipla	G
Ari Gold	1974–2021	American	Pop singer	G
Judy Gold	b. 1962	American	Comedian	L
Dana Goldberg	b. 1974	American	Comedian	L
Jackie Goldberg	b. 1937	American	Politician	L
Jason Goldberg	b. ?	American	Internet entrepreneur	G
Alison Goldfrapp	b. 1966	English	Singer, musician (Goldfrapp)	B
Brett Goldin	1977–2006	South African	Actor	G
Nan Goldin	b. 1953	American	Photographer	B
Julie Goldman	b. ?	American	Comedian	L
Andrea Goldsmith	b. 1950	Australian	Writer	L
Christy Goldsmith Romero	b. ?	American	Lawyer, government official	B
Andrew Goldstein	b. 1983	American	Lacrosse player	G
Richard Goldstein	b. 1944	American	Writer, journalist, editor	G
Oliver Goldstick	b. 1961	American	Screenwriter, producer	G
Gabriella Goliger	b. ?	Canadian	Writer	L
Marija Golubeva	b. 1973	Latvian	Politician, political scientist, historian	L
Witold Gombrowicz	1904–1969	Polish	Author, playwright	B
Marcelo Gomes	b. 1979	Brazilian	Ballet dancer	G
Peter Gomes	b. 1942	American	Baptist preacher, theologian	G
Georgette Gómez	b. 1975	American	Politician	L
Jewelle Gomez	b. 1948	American	Writer, cultural worker	L
Marga Gomez	b. 1960	American	Comedian	L
Agustín Gómez-Arcos	1933–1998	Spanish	Author	G
Prince Gomolvilas	b. 1972	American	Playwright	G
Gongmin of Goryeo	1330–1374	Korean	King during the Goryeo Dynasty	B
Ginger Gonzaga	b. 1983	American	Comedian, actor	B
Javier Gonzales	b. 1966	American	Politician; 1st only openly gay mayor of Santa Fe, New Mexico	G
Maya Christina Gonzalez	b. 1964	American	Artist	L
Naomi Gonzalez	b. 1978	American	Politician, lawyer	L
Rigoberto González	b. 1970	American	Writer	G
Tomás González	b. 1985	Chilean	Gymnast	G
Félix González-Torres	1957–1996	Cuban	Artist	G
X González	b. 1999	American	Activist, gun control advocate	B
Noam Gonick	b. 1970	Canadian	Artist, filmmaker	G
Brad Gooch	b. 1952	American	Writer	G
Paul Goodman	1911–1972	American	Writer	B
Wes Goodman	b. 1984	American	Politician outed after several sex scandals	G
Agnes Goodsir	1864–1939	Australian	Portrait painter	L
Julie Goodyear	b. 1942	English	Actor	B
Debbie Googe	b. 1962	English	Rock musician (My Bloody Valentine)	L
Daniel Vincent Gordh	b. 1985	American	Actor, writer, comedian	G
Derrick Gordon	b. 1991	American	College basketball player	G
Peter Gordon	b. 1963	New Zealand	Chef	G
Rich Gordon	b. 1948	American	Politician	G
Lesley Gore	1946–2015	American	Pop musician	L
Eva Gore-Booth	1870–1926	Irish	Writer, activist	L
Geoffrey Gorer	1905–1985	English	Anthropologist, author	G
Brad Goreski	b. 1977	American	TV personality	G
R. C. Gorman	1931–2005	American	American artist of the Navajo Nation	G
Stephanie Gosk	b. 1972	American	Journalist, correspondent	L
James Goss	b. 1974	English	Writer, TV producer	G
John C. Goss	b. 1958	American	Artist, writer	G
Tom Goss	b. 1981	American	Singer-songwriter, actor	G
Deondray Gossett	b. 1973	American	Producer, director, actor	G
Manuel Luís Goucha	b. 1954	Portuguese	TV personality, actor, restaurateur	G
Alex Goude	b. 1975	French	Actor, TV host, theatre director	G
Jason Gould	b. 1966	American	Actor	G
Juan Goytisolo	1931–2017	Spanish	Author, poet	B
Joseph Grabarz	b. 1956	American	Politician	G
Jasmin Grabowski	b. 1991	German	Judoka	L
Chris Grace	b. 1973	American	Actor, comedian	G
Nickolas Grace	b. 1947	English	Actor	G
Joey Graceffa	b. 1991	American	YouTube Personality	G
Colin Grafton	b. 1991	American	Pair skater	G
Gary Graham	b. 1969	American	Fashion designer, artist	G
Gwendolyn Graham	b. 1963	American	Serial killer	L
Jessica Graham	b. ?	American	Actor	L
Judy Grahn	b. 1940	American	Poet	L
Ofir Raul Graizer	b. 1981	Israeli	Film director	G
Julieta Grajales	b. 1986	Mexican	Actor	L
Élisabeth de Gramont	1875–1954	French	Writer	B
Steve Grand	b. 1990	American	Singer, songwriter, model	G
Frankie Grande	b. 1983	American	Actor, dancer, TV personality	G
Michael Grandage	b. 1962	English	Theatre director	G
Fernando Grande-Marlaska	b. 1962	Spanish	Judge, politician	G
LZ Granderson	b. 1972	American	Sportswriter	G
Farley Granger	1925–2011	American	Actor	B
John Grant	b. 1968	American	Rock musician (The Czars)	G
Russell Grant	b. 1951	English	Astrologer	G
Stephen Granville	b. ?	British	Pop musician (Bronski Beat)	G
Francisco Granizo Ribadeneira	1925–2009	Ecuadorian	Poet	G
Toni Graphia	b. 1961/62	American	TV writer, producer	L
Stéphane Grappelli	1908–1997	French	Jazz violinist (Quintette du Hot Club de France)	G
Mitch Grassi	b. 1992	American	Singer, songwriter (Pentatonix, Superfruit)	G
John C. Graves	1938–2003	American	Professor, psychotherapist, singer, philanthropist	G
Mette Gravholt	b. 1984	Danish	Handball player	L
Chelsea Gray	b. 1992	American	Basketball player	L
Eileen Gray	1878–1976	Irish	Architect, furniture designer	B
Gregory Gray	1959–2019	Northern Irish	Singer, musician	G
Jim Gray	b. 1953	American	Politician and 1st openly gay man to serve as the mayor of Lexington and a cabinet secretary in Kentucky	G
Jim Gray	1958–2005	Northern Irish	Northern Ireland Ulster loyalist paramilitary leader	B
Devon Graye	b. 1987	American	Actor	G
Devin K. Grayson	b. ?	American	Comic book writer and novelist	B
Jack Dylan Grazer	b. 2003	American	Actor	B
Hank Green	b. 1980	American	YouTuber, science communicator, novelist, comedian	B
Steven Greenberg	b. 1956	American	Orthodox rabbi	G
Harlan Greene	b. 1953	American	Writer	G
Kenny Greene	1969–2001	American	R&B musician (The Intro)	G
Robert Joseph Greene	b. 1973	Canadian	Writer	G
Justine Greening	b. 1969	English	Politician	B
Glenn Greenwald	b. 1967	American	Journalist	G
Alex Greenwich	b. 1980	Australian	Politician	G
Michael Greer	1938–2002	American	Actor, comedian, cabaret performer	G
Pascal Greggory	b. 1954	French	Actor	G
Francesca Gregorini	b. 1968	Italian-American	Screenwriter, film director	L
Brian Greig	b. 1966	Australian	Politician	G
Richard Grenell	b. 1966	American	Diplomat	G
Dorien Grey	1933–2015	American	Mystery writer	G
Joel Grey	b. 1932	American	Actor	G
Sasha Grey	b. 1988	American	Actor, writer	B
John Greyson	b. 1960	Canadian	Filmmaker	G
Barbara Grier	1933–2011	American	Writer, publisher	L
Charles Griffes	1884–1920	American	20th century classical composer	G
Chad Griffin	b. 1973	American	Political strategist	G
Emile Griffith	1938–2013	American	Boxer	B
Franco Grillini	b. 1955	Italian	Politician, LGBT rights activist	G
Brittney Griner	b. 1990	American	Basketball player	L
Inka Grings	b. 1978	German	Footballer	B
Darren Grimes	b. 1993	English	Political commentator, activist	G
Angelina Weld Grimke	1880–1958	American	Journalist, poet	L
Nick Grimshaw	b. 1984	English	DJ, radio and TV presenter	G.
Jim Grimsley	b. 1955	American	Writer, playwright	G
Pierre Gripari	1925–1990	French	Author	G
GRiZ	b. 1990	American	DJ, electronic music producer	G
George Grizzard	1928–2007	American	Actor	G
David Groff	b. ?	American	Poet, author	G
Jonathan Groff	b. 1985	American	Actor	G
Ole Henrik Grønn	b. 1984	Norwegian	Politician	G
Gloria Groove	b. 1995	Brazilian	Singer, rapper, drag queen	G
Leonardo Grosso	b. 1983	Argentine	Politician	G
Gerald Grosz	b. 1977	Austrian	Politician, author, columnist	G
Friedrich-Paul von Groszheim	1906–2003	German	WWII concentration camp survivor	G
James Gruber	1928–2011	American	Activist	B
Brett Josef Grubisic	b. 1963	Canadian	Writer	G
Detlef Grumbach	b. 1955	German	Writer, journalist	G
Luca Guadagnino	b. 1971	Italian	Film director	G
Stephen Guarino	b. 1975	American	Actor, comedian	G
Guðmundur Ingi Guðbrandsson	b. 1977	Icelandic	Politician, first Icelandic openly gay male minister	G
Pierre Guénin	1927–2017	French	Journalist, magazine publisher, gay rights activist	G
Jacques Guérin	1902–2000	French	Industrialist	G
Mondo Guerra	b. 1978	American	Fashion designer	G
Thomas Guerra	b. 1985	American	Landscape architect convicted in California of purposefully infecting others with HIV	G
Alexis Guerrera	b. 1971	Argentine	Politician	G
Patrick Guerriero	b. 1968	American	Politician	G
Michael E. Guest	b. 1957	American	Diplomat, Ambassador to Romania	G
Carol Guess	b. 1968	American	Writer	L
Joan Guetschow	b. 1966	American	Biathlete	L
Annie Guglia	b. 1990	Canadian	Skateboarder	L
Hervé Guibert	1955–1990	French	Writer	G
Norma Guillard	b. ?	Cuban	Social psychologist, adjunct lecturer at the University of Havana	L
Harvey Guillén	b. 1990	American	Actor	G
Alec Guinness	1914–2000	English	Actor	B
Jack Guinness	b. 1982	British	Writer, model	G
Alain Guiraudie	b. 1964	French	Film director, screenwriter	G
Guitarricadelafuente	b. 1997	Spanish	Singer, guitarist	G
Joe Gulla	b. 1964	American	Playwright, actor	G
Leo Gullotta	b. 1946	Italian	Actor, comedian, writer	G
Steve Gunderson	b. 1951	American	Politician	G
Isobel Gunn	1780–1861	Scottish	Laborer who passed as a man	L
Sakia Gunn	1987–2003	American	Teenage murder victim	L
Sean Gunn	b. 1993	Zimbabwean	Swimmer	G
Tim Gunn	b. 1953	American	TV personality	G
Jessica Gunning	b. 1986	English	Actor	L
Michael Gunning	b. 1994	Jamaican	Swimmer	B
Sunil Gupta	b. 1953	Indian-Canadian	Photographer	G
Vikas Gupta	b. 1988	Indian	TV host, producer, screenwriter	B
Allan Gurganus	b. 1947	American	Writer	G
Prabal Gurung	b. 1975	Nepalese-American	Fashion designer	G
Menaka Guruswamy	b. 1974	Indian	Senior Advocate of the Supreme Court of India	L
Reed Gusciora	b. 1960	American	Politician	G
Elina Gustafsson	b. 1992	Finnish	Boxer	L
Paulo Gustavo	1978–2021	Brazilian	Actor, comedian	G
Froy Gutierrez	b. 1998	American	Actor, singer	G
Ignacio Gutiérrez	b. 1976	Chilean	Journalist	G
Israel Gutierrez	b. 1977	American	Journalist	G
Raymond Gutierrez	b. 1984	Filipino	Actor, TV host	G
Víctor Gutiérrez	b. 1991	Spanish	Water polo player	G
Eva Gutowski	b. 1994	American	YouTube personality, actor	B
Amos Guttman	1954–1993	Israeli	Film director	G
Roma Guy	b. 1942	American	LGBT and women's rights activist	L
Astrid Guyart	b. 1983	French	Fencer	L
Lucía Guzmán	b. 1945	American	Politician	L
Demna Gvasalia	b. 1981	Georgian	Fashion designer	G
Roland Gwynne	1882–1971	English	Politician, lover of suspected serial killer John Bodkin Adams	G

== See also ==
- List of gay, lesbian or bisexual people
