= Fasana (surname) =

Fasana is an Italian surname. Notable people with this surname include:

- Erika Fasana (born 1996), Italian artistic gymnast
- Paul Fasana, American librarian and archivist

== See also ==
- Fasana (disambiguation)
- Fasano (surname)
