= Fasana =

Fasana may refer to:

- Fasana, Italian name of Fažana, a village and a municipality on the western coast of Istria, in Croatia
- SMS Tátra renamed Fasana, Austro-Hungarian lead ship
- Fasana-class destroyer or Tátra-class destroyer, ship class
- Fasana (surname), an Italian surname
- Fasana Channel, a strait in the northern Adriatic Sea

== See also ==
- Fasana-class destroyer, a group of six destroyers built for the Austro-Hungarian Navy
- Fasano, a commune in Apulia, Italy
- Fasana-e-Azad, an Urdu-language novel in four parts by Indian writer Ratan Nath Dhar Sarshar
