= Fasano (surname) =

Fasano is an Italian surname. Notable people with the surname include:

- Alessio Fasano, Italian pediatric gastroenterologist
- Anthony Fasano (born 1984), American football tight-end
- Clara Fasano (1900–1990), Italian-born American sculptor
- Joseph Fasano (born 1982), poet
- Len Fasano (born 1958), American politician
- Mike Fasano (born 1958), state politician in Florida
- Renato Fasano (1902–1979), Italian conductor and musicologist, Founder of I Virtuosi di Roma.
- Sal Fasano (born 1971), American baseball catcher

== See also ==
- Fasana (surname)
