= Stonewall National Museum and Archives =

Museum and library

Coordinates: 26.1367°N 80.1301°W

Stonewall National Museum Archives & Library
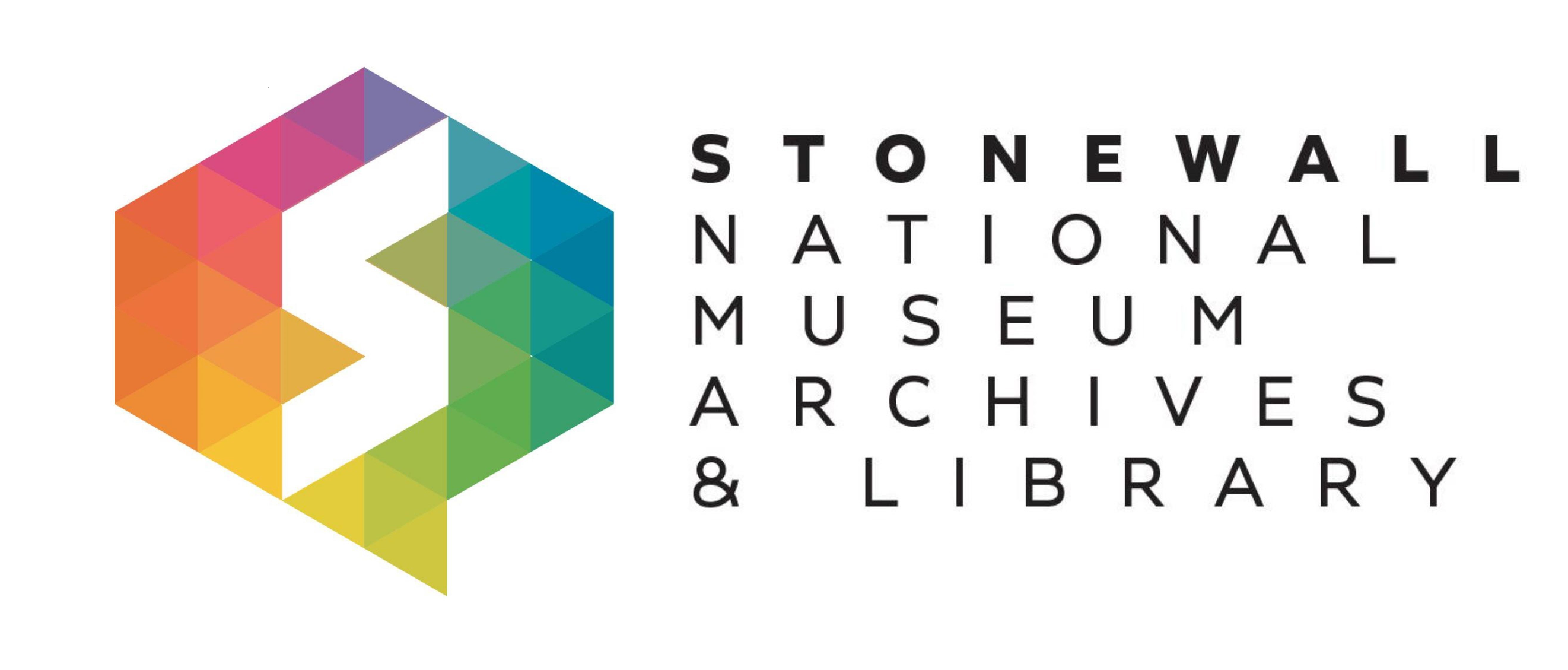
- Established: 1973
- Location: 1300 E Sunrise Blvd, Fort Lauderdale, Florida, United States
- Founder: Mark Silber
- Executive director: Robert Kesten
- Website: stonewall-museum.org

Stonewall National Museum Archives & Library (SNMAL, officially Stonewall Library & Archives Inc.) is the first national LGBTQ+ Museum in the United States. SNMAL is a nonprofit, tax-exempt 501(c)(3) organization in Fort Lauderdale, Florida that promotes understanding through preserving, interpreting and sharing the culture of lesbian, gay, bisexual and transgender people and their role in society. It owns and manages a library and archival collection and presents a series of public programs. SNMAL has two small exhibition areas (Ross Gallery and Hester Gallery) with changing exhibitions drawn primarily from its collections, with notable exceptions organized with partner organizations such as their program presented in partnership with the Bayard Rustin Center for Social Justice, amplifying the oft-erased intersectional Black Queer Civil & LGBTQIA+ Rights Pioneer Bayard Rustin that spotlights the importance of intersectionality intertwined with stories of the civil rights movement in their “Bayard Rustin at the Crossroads” exhibit. Additionally, SNMAL hosts a web-based LGBTQ timeline of American LGBTQ history, launched in 2021 and known as In Plain Sight. Although Stonewall's name is inspired by the Stonewall Inn where the 1969 Stonewall riots took place, the museum and archive has no direct connection with the New York location.

== History ==
SNMAL was founded in 1973 by Mark N. Silber. The collection was housed in his parents' home for 10 years. It was moved to a classroom at the Sunshine Cathedral, Metropolitan Community Church in Fort Lauderdale, Florida, around 1983. The library merged with the Boca Raton-based Southern Gay Archives which were organized by Joel Starkey and collectively they formed Stonewall Library & Archives, Inc. In 2001, the library and archive moved into the Gay and Lesbian Community Center of South Florida at 1717 North Andrews Avenue.

Several years later, the center was slated for demolition, so Stonewall began looking for other options. They were approached by Broward County, who offered space at a former Fort Lauderdale library branch of the Broward County library at 1300 East Sunrise Blvd in Fort Lauderdale. The Broward County Commission approved the move in a 9-0 vote on 10 June 2007. The new location opened in February 2009.

In 2014 the Stonewall opened a branch, the Stonewall Gallery, at 2157 Wilton Drive in neighboring Wilton Manors. That location was closed in June 2020 as part of the Stonewall's efforts to consolidate its operations in a single location.

== Library ==
The John C. Graves Library contains volumes all relating to or about LGBTQ+ topics, and it is one of the largest lending libraries of LGBTQ+ materials in the United States. A membership to SNMAL is required in order to check-out materials, but the library is free and open to the public for researching and browsing, and membership is free to all high school and college students. SNMAL also provides free wireless internet access to all who visit. The library accepts donations, but the materials must be by or about LGBTQ+ subjects. Non-LGBTQ+ materials will not be accepted. For any donations they receive that are already in the collection, these duplicate materials are typically sold for $1 or placed with another LGBTQ+ library or community center. All are welcome to search SNMAL's library catalogue.

Circulating collection topics include: fiction; non-fiction; biography; foreign languages; fine arts; pulp fiction; youth and young adult; and, DVDS, audio books and CDs.

Available by request to members are subjects in the Special and Restricted collections. These are:

- Special collections: These items are unique in nature or content.
- Out-of-date AIDS books: These books go as far back as the early 1980s and are about the cause, prevention, and care of HIV and AIDS related illnesses. Due to no longer being factually correct, these items are kept off of public shelves. They are, however, preserved as a record of the impact that AIDS had on the gay male community.
- Erotica: These materials only are available to people 18 years or older who have an SNMAL membership.
- Signed and/or highly valued books: Due to the uniqueness and difficulty in replacing these books, they are kept off of public shelves.
- Restricted collection: These materials are non-circulating books due to their rare nature, which include first editions, antique volumes signed by the author, and other special attributes. There are usually later versions of the same book in this collection on the public shelves that are available for circulation.

== Items in collections ==
As of 2026, there are about 30,000 volumes in the library, including nearly 1,000 rare books. The library is organized under the Library of Congress system and the entire catalog can be viewed on SNMA's website. About 5,000 people visit the library each year including casual readers and academic researchers.

Additionally, there are 2,700 linear feet of archival materials, totaling more than 6 million pieces of paper, mostly from 1950 to the present day. The collection contains serials from around the nation, as well as private and organizational papers. However, its principle focus is the American Southeast (west of Houston, TX and south of Washington, DC). In some cases, the copies of serials in Stonewall's possession are the only known paper copy. Three warehouses worth of archival content were organized into a single collection by volunteer chief archivist Paul Fasana, in whose honour the collection is now named. In 2020, SNMAL received a grant from the Andrew W. Mellon Foundation which will allow it to digitize a portion of its archive to preserve the contents and to make them available to a world-wide audience.

In 2020, SNMAL's board adopted recommendations from its Anti-Racism Task Force with the intention of diversifying its holdings, programs, staff and board.

== Programs ==
Stonewall hosts numerous public programs which bring awareness to LGBTQ issues. Stonewall hosts movie nights, book clubs, workshops, film screenings, and socials. Other events include fundraisers, walks, talks with writers, gallery exhibits, volunteer programs, and participation in LGBTQ events out in the community.

The Stonewall National Education Project conducts an annual symposium for educators and administrators on LGBTQ curriculum and best practices for providing a safe environment for LGBTQ youth. The Stonewall Archives is a resource that is used to integrate historically-relevant, accurate, information about LGBTQ history and culture into curriculum and lesson plans, intended to provide teachers the opportunity to teach and discuss LGBTQ history

== See also ==
- Timeline of LGBT history
