= Paul Fasana =

American librarian and archivist

- Born: Utah, US
- Died: April 2021
- Education: UC Berkeley
- Occupation: Librarian
- Partner: Robert Graham

Paul Fasana (died April 2021) was an American librarian and archivist.

Born in Utah to Mary and Oreste Fasana, he moved to San Francisco by age six. He enlisted in the U.S. Army and served the Korean War. He used funding from the GI Bill to enter the University of California, Berkeley, receiving a bachelor's degree in 1959 and a Master of Library Science in 1960. He came out as gay during his masters studies.

On graduation he began working at the New York Public Library (NYPL) in cataloguing, and subsequently worked at Itek Corporation and Columbia University Libraries before returning to NYPL as a vice president and Director of the Research Libraries. He retired in 1995.

From his retirement until his death, Fasana served in a volunteer capacity as the chief archivist of the Stonewall National Museum and Archives (SNMA). He was responsible for organizing three warehouses of content into a single accessible collection. A SNMA executive director said "More than any other single individual, [Fasana] is responsible for the richness of the vast archives at Stonewall... Future generations of scholars and researchers will owe him a debt of gratitude".

A named fellowship at UC Berkeley supports School of Information students "whose research interests or studies are related to lesbian, gay, bisexual, transgender and/or queer studies in any field or discipline". The SNMA archival collection is named the Fasana/Graham collection in recognition of Fasana and his longtime partner Robert Graham.
