= John C. Graves =

American psychotherapist and gay rights philanthropist (1938–2003)

John Cowperthwaite Graves (May 16, 1938 – October 13, 2003) was a professor, psychotherapist, singer, and philanthropist associated with the LGBTQ+ rights movement in Boston, Massachusetts and Fort Lauderdale, Florida. He died on October 13, 2003, from heart failure at the age of 65.

== Biography ==
Graves was born on May 16, 1938, in New York City into an affluent family. He attended Princeton University where he received his doctorate degree in philosophy. He then went on to work as a professor teaching philosophy at Massachusetts Institute of Technology (MIT) for ten years between 1964 and 1974. After receiving a sizable inheritance, Graves left teaching and began working as a psychotherapist with Homophile Community Health Service in Boston.

In 1972, three years after the Stonewall riots, Graves came out to his students at MIT, becoming the first openly gay professor at the university. In addition to his work with Homophile Community Health Service, Graves became involved in Boston's LesBiGay community, which included helping to found the Boston Center for Lesbians and Gay Men and the Gay Academic Union of New England. Graves was also an opera singer who sang in choirs in Provincetown, Fort Lauderdale, and Boston, including the Boston Gay Men's Chorus. Graves was interviewed in 1994 for the book Out for Good: The Struggle to Build a Gay Rights Movement in America.

In 1990, Graves moved to Fort Lauderdale, Florida and became involved in local LGBTQ+ organizations. Notably, Graves was elected president of Stonewall Library and Archives in 1992 and subsequently as president of its honorary board of trustees until his death. Other local involvements included singing in the choir at the Sunshine Cathedral Metropolitan Community Church and serving as president of Gays United to Attack Repression and Discrimination.

Graves put a great deal of wealth towards various institutions, including the Gay and Lesbian Community Center, MIT, Princeton, Boston Concert Opera, Institute of Gay and Lesbian Strategic Studies, Pride Center at Equality Park, and the American Civil Liberties Union (ACLU) Lesbian, Gay, Bisexual, and Transgender Project. Graves also donated $100,000 to Stonewall Library and Archives to help the institution's expansion and $300,000 to Metropolitan Community Church’s Sunshine Cathedral to help support a move to a new campus.

The John C. Graves Charitable Fund, which began with $3.1 million managed by the Community Foundation of Broward, was set up to fund the Metropolitan Community Church, the Stonewall Library and Archives, and a new facility for the Pride Center and was intended to be fully spent within ten years of Graves’s death. A $50,000 grant awarded to the ACLU from the fund led to the creation of the John C. Graves Fellowship to advance gay and lesbian rights. The first recipient of this fellowship was Robert Rosenwald Jr., the attorney who helped overturn Florida’s ban on gay couples’ ability to adopt in 2010.

== Written Work ==
In addition to his 1971 doctoral dissertation entitled The Conceptual Foundations of Contemporary Relativity Theory and his 1972 MIT Report on Undergraduate Housing in the 1970s, Graves wrote and published an autobiography entitled Many Roads Traveled.

== Honors & Legacy ==
Graves received a number of accolades for his philanthropy and charity. The Gay and Lesbian Foundation of Florida honored Graves with a humanitarian award. In 2001, the Association of Fundraising Professionals honored Graves as an outstanding philanthropist for his charity, making him the first openly gay man to receive said honor. Thanks to his work and donations, the Stonewall Library and Archives named the John C. Graves Reading Room in his honor. The Sunshine Cathedral of the Metropolitan Community Church also named and dedicated its John C. Graves building to the legacy and contribution of Graves’ philanthropic work.

== Bibliography ==
“ACLU of Florida Creates John C. Graves Gay Rights Fellowship with Grant from Community Foundation of Broward.” American Civil Liberties Union.

‌Cavanaugh, Donald. “John C. Graves Fund Still Supporting the Community Years after His Passing.” Southfloridagaynews.com. Accessed 26 Feb. 2021.

Graves, John C. Many Roads Traveled : The Autobiography of John C. Graves. S.l.: Economy Printing, 2000. Print. ISBN 0970457405

Monteagudo, Jesse. “John Graves and His Legacy.” GayToday.com. Accessed 26 Feb. 2021.

‌Nagourney, Adam, and Clendinen, Dudley. Out For Good: The Struggle to Build a Gay Rights Movement in Ame. N.p., Simon & Schuster, 2013. ISBN 0684867435

Wyman, Scott. “JOHN GRAVES, PHILANTHROPIST.” Sun-Sentinel.com. Accessed 26 Feb. 2021.
