= List of gay, lesbian or bisexual people: Sj–Sz =

This is a partial list of notable people who were or are gay men, lesbian or bisexual.

The historical concept and definition of sexual orientation varies and has changed greatly over time; for example, the general term "gay" wasn't used to describe sexual orientation until the mid-20th century. A number of different classification schemes have been used to describe sexual orientation since the mid-19th century, and scholars have often defined the term "sexual orientation" in divergent ways. Indeed, several studies have found that much of the research about sexual orientation has failed to define the term at all, making it difficult to reconcile the results of different studies. However, most definitions include a psychological component (such as the direction of an individual's erotic desire) and/or a behavioural component (which focuses on the sex of the individual's sexual partner/s). Some prefer to simply follow an individual's self-definition or identity.

The high prevalence of people from the West on this list may be due to societal attitudes towards homosexuality. The Pew Research Center's 2013 Global Attitudes Survey found that there is “greater acceptance in more secular and affluent countries,” with "publics in 39 countries [having] broad acceptance of homosexuality in North America, the European Union, and much of Latin America, but equally widespread rejection in predominantly Muslim nations and in Africa, as well as in parts of Asia and in Russia. Opinion about the acceptability of homosexuality is divided in Israel, Poland and Bolivia.” As of 2013, Americans are divided – a majority (60 percent) believes homosexuality should be accepted, while 33 percent disagree.

== Sj–Sz ==
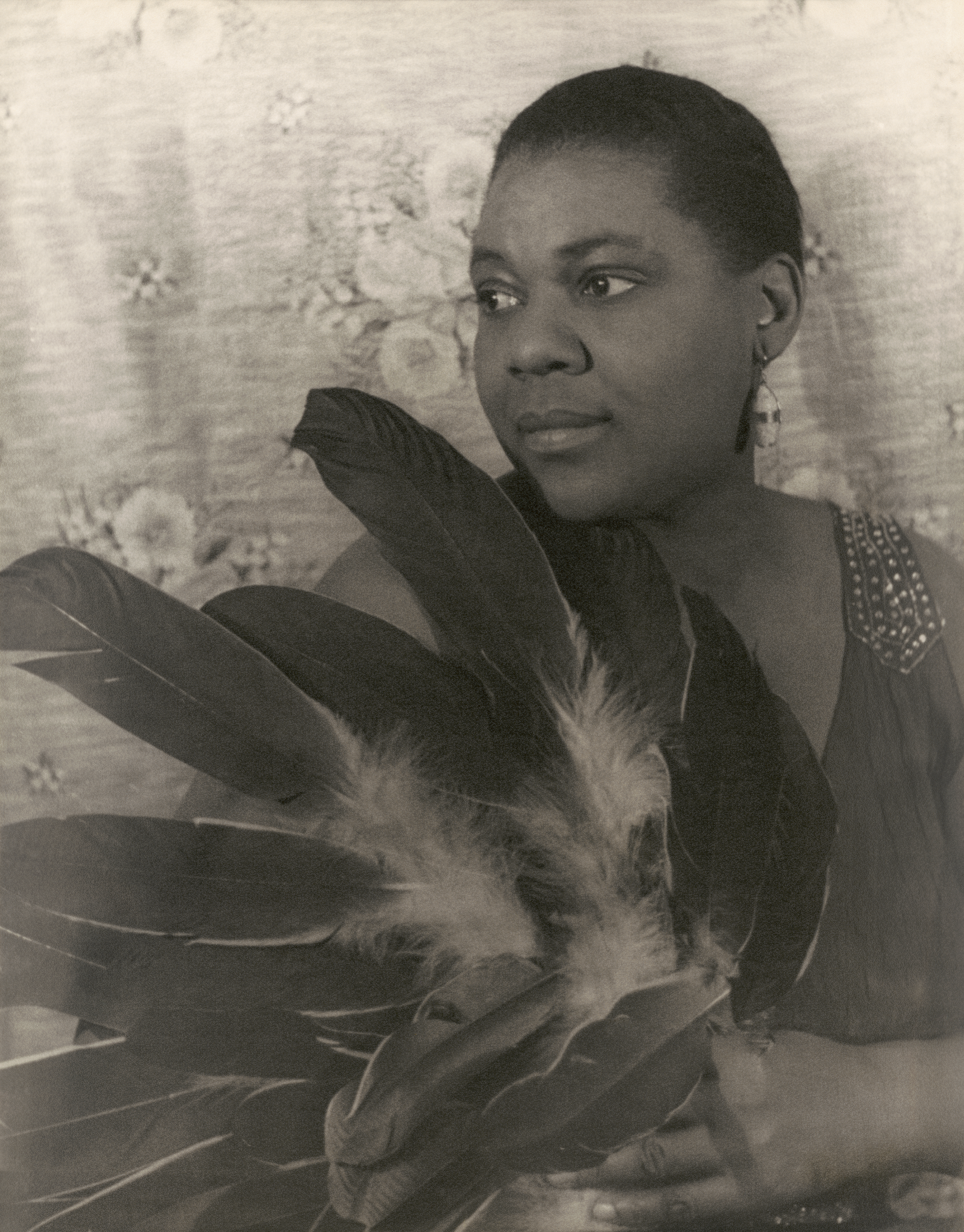
Blues singer Bessie Smith

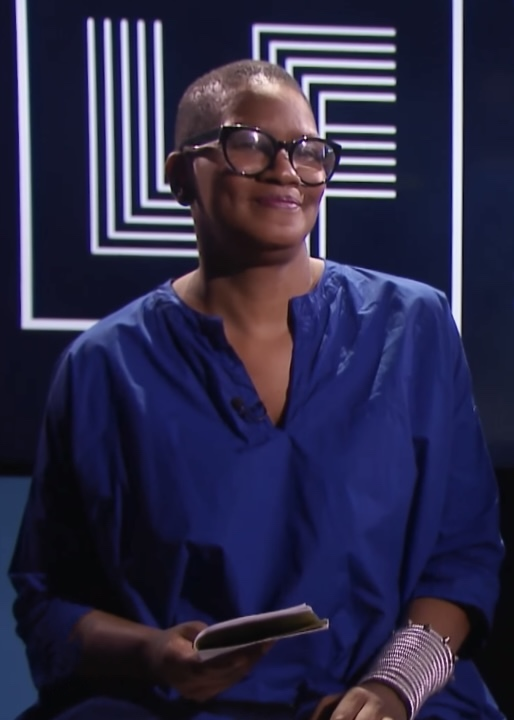
Poet, performance artist, actress and activist Pamela Sneed

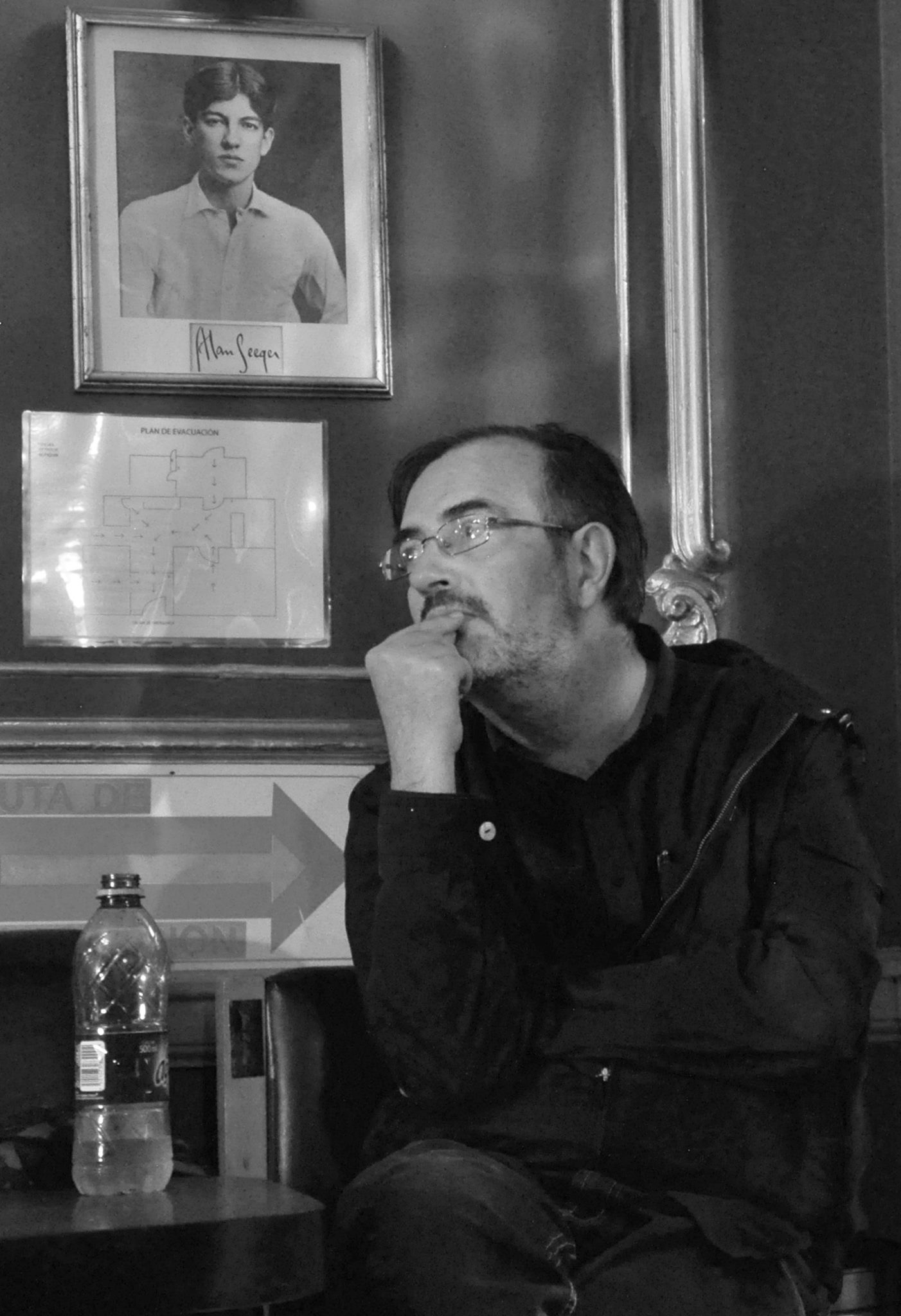
Author and poet Pablo Soler Frost

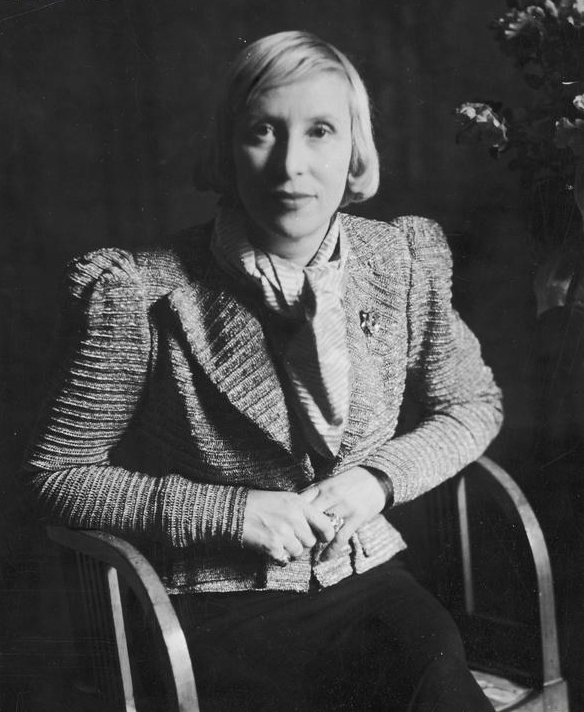
Singer and actress Suzy Solidor

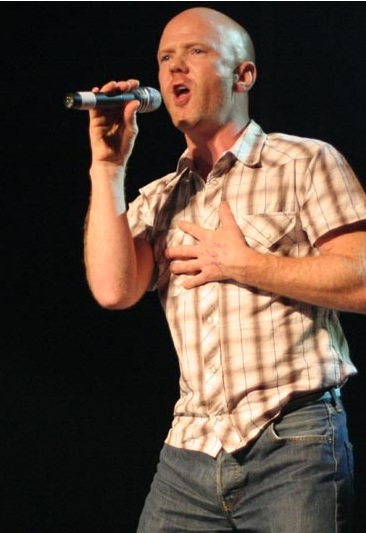
Pop singer Jimmy Somerville

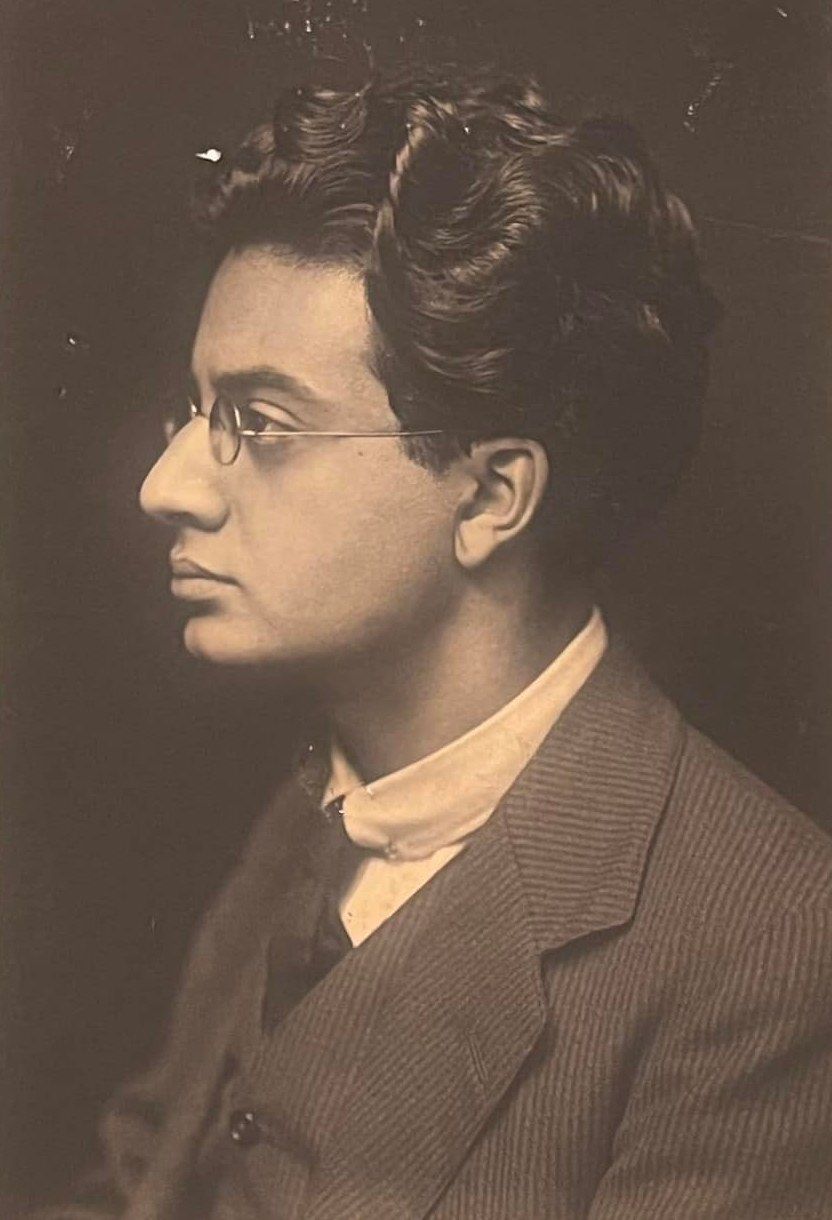
Composer, music critic, pianist and writer Kaikhosru Shapurji Sorabji

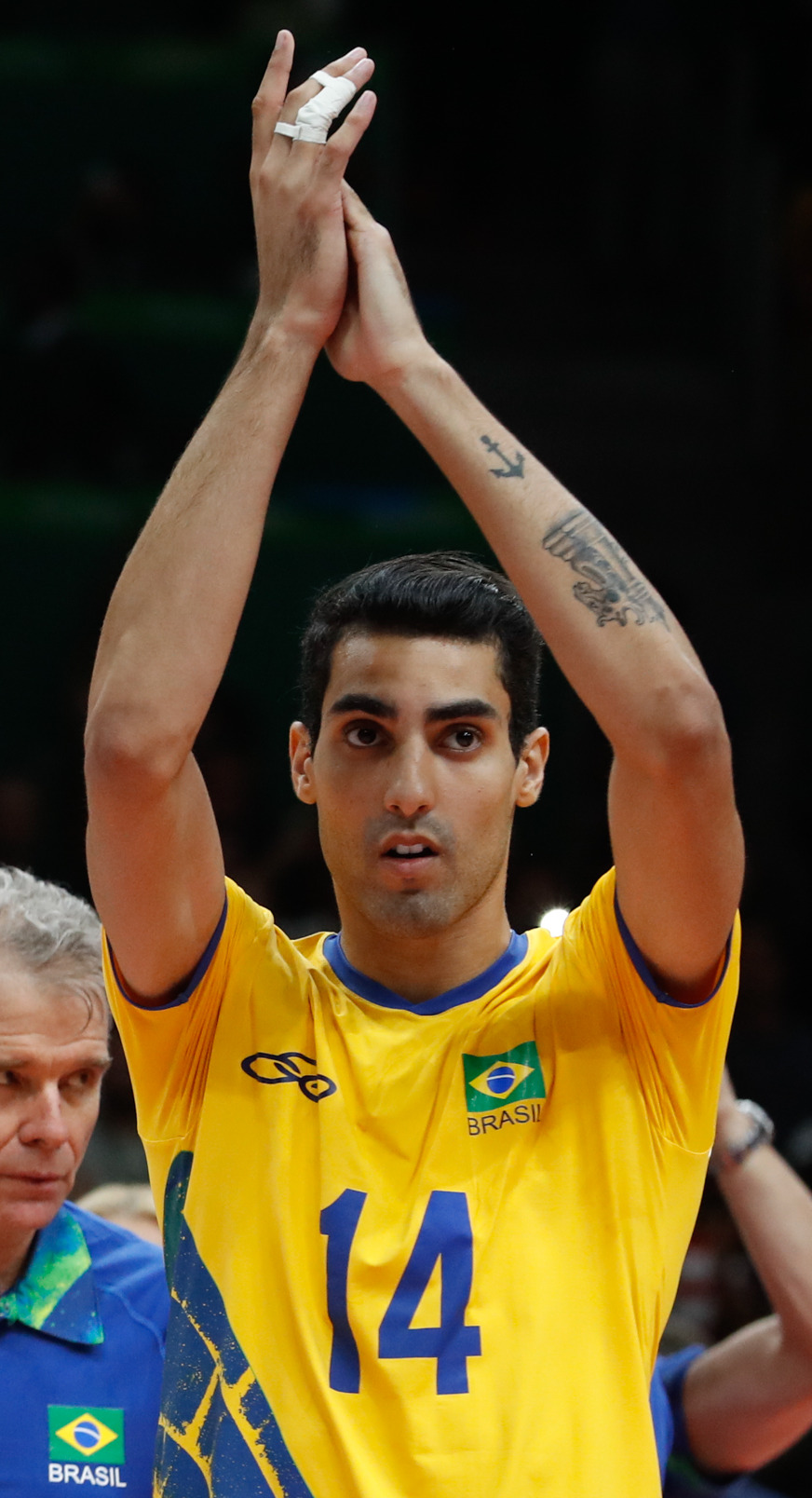
Volleyball player Douglas Souza

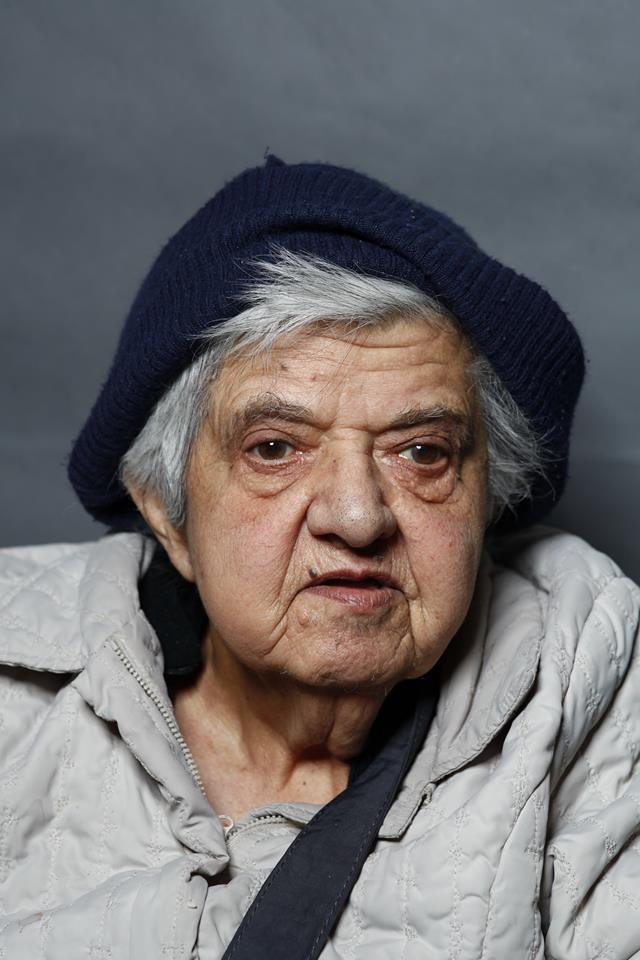
LGBT rights activist, feminist, magazine founder and publisher Mariasilvia Spolato

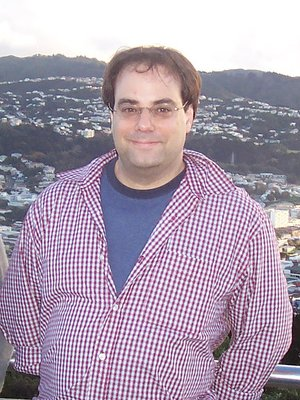
Software engineer Joel Spolsky

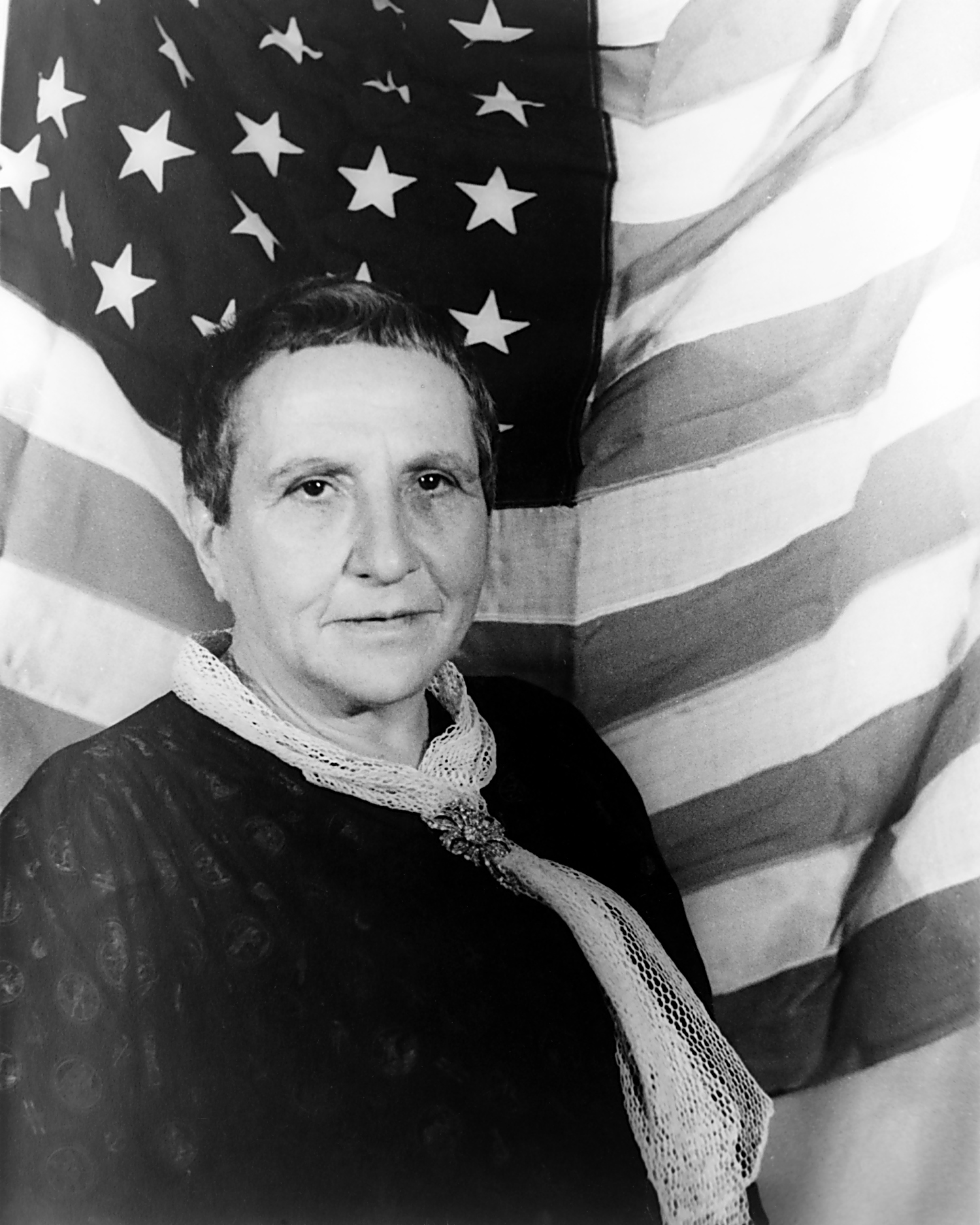
Writer Gertrude Stein

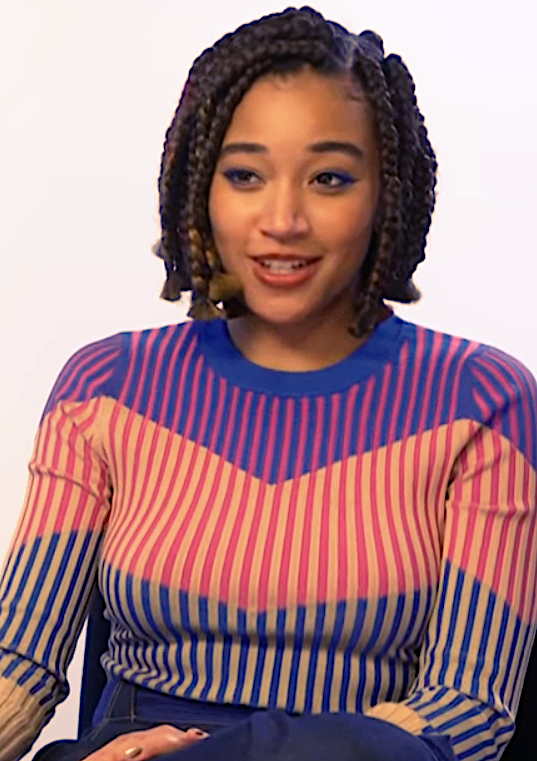
Actress Amandla Stenberg

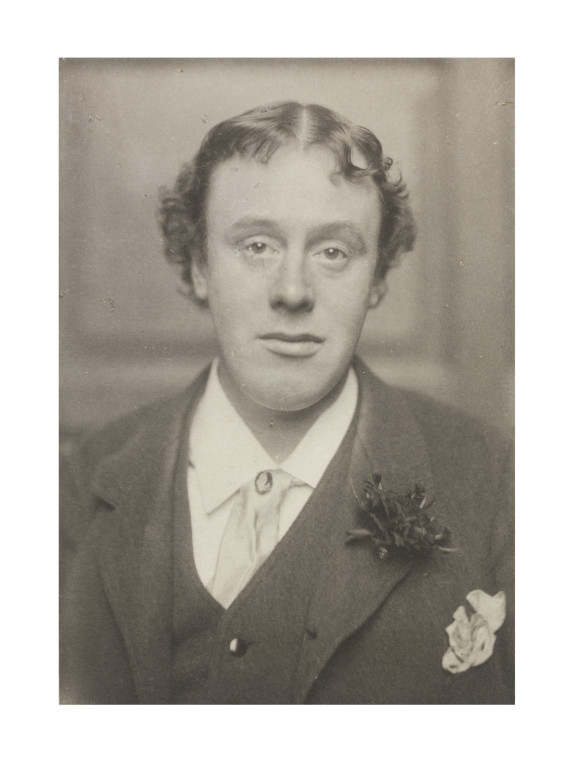
Poet and writer Eric Stenbock

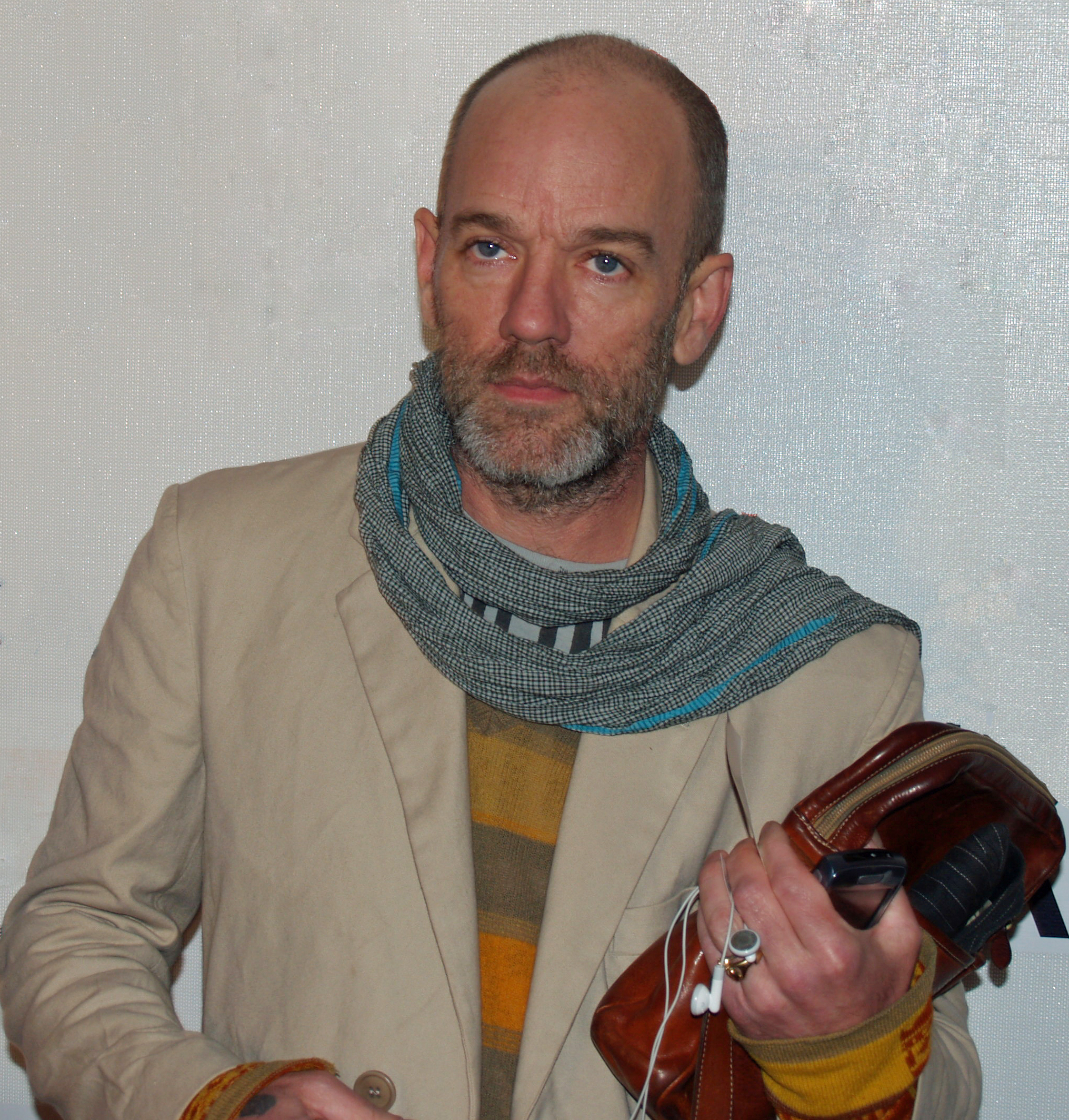
Musician Michael Stipe

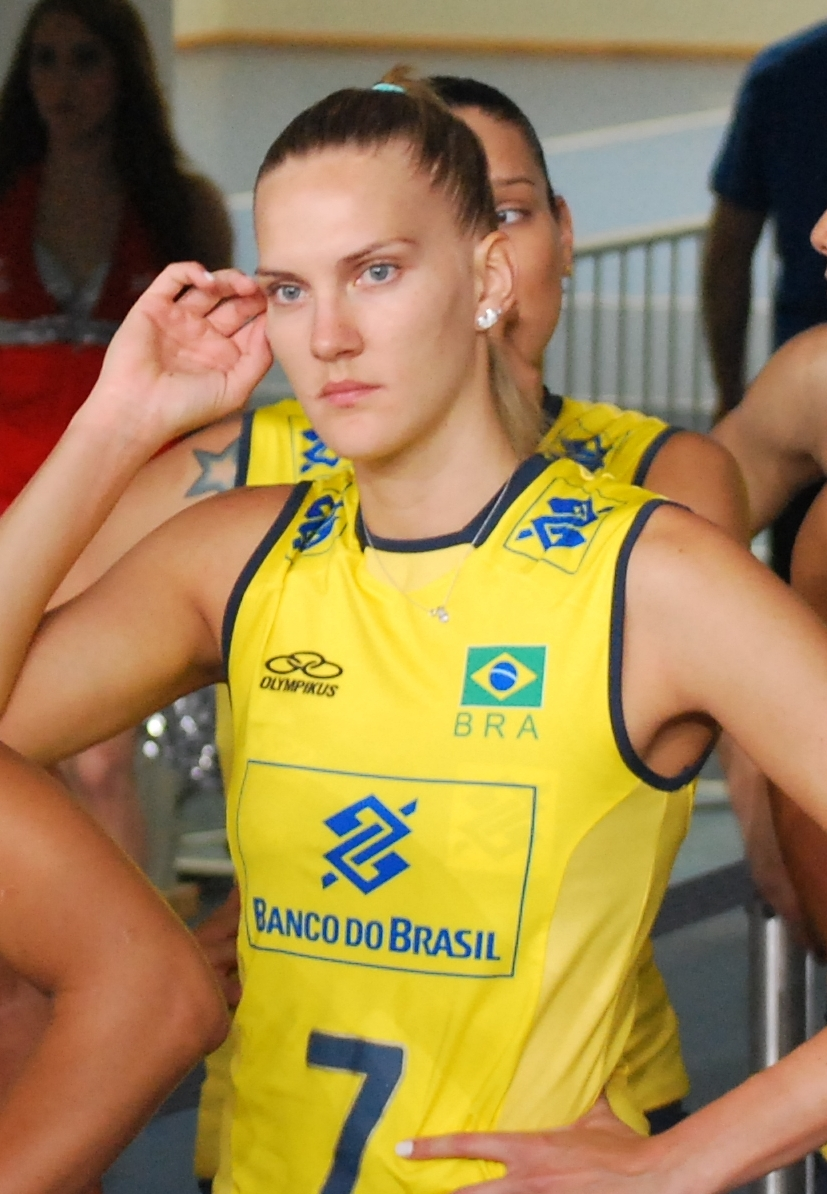
Volleyball player Marianne Steinbrecher

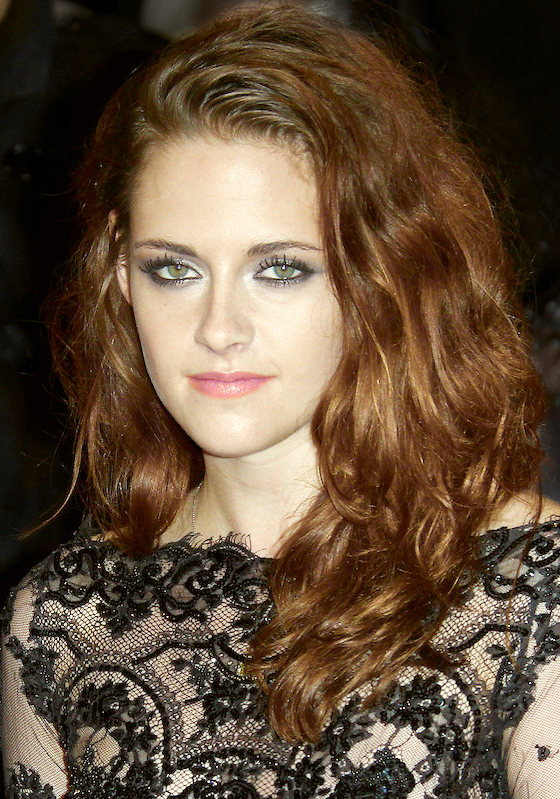
Actress Kristen Stewart

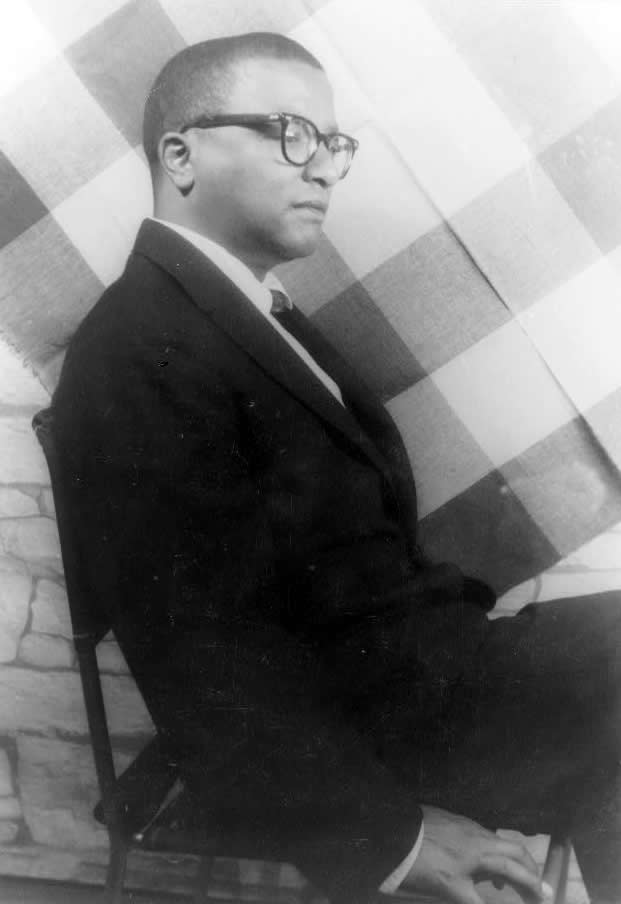
Jazz composer Billy Strayhorn

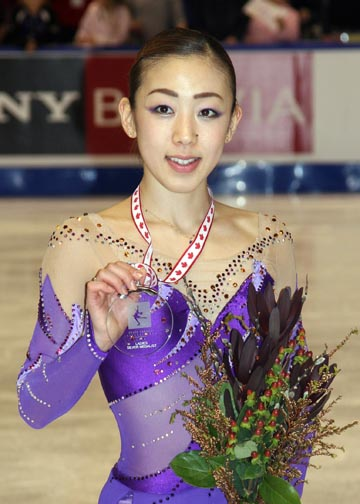
Figure skater Fumie Suguri

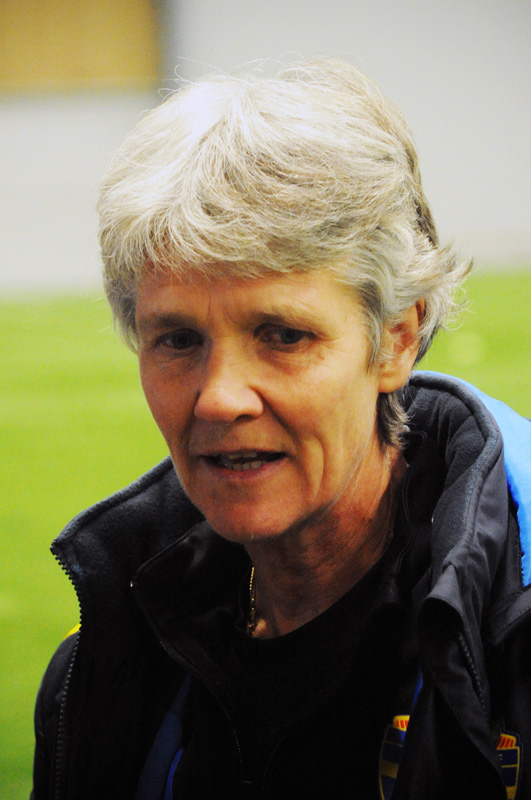
Footballer and coach Pia Sundhage

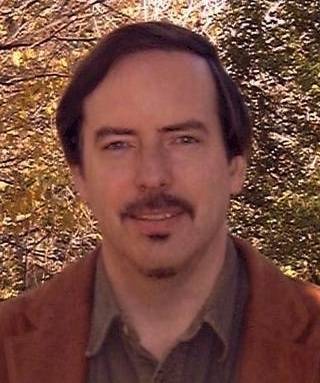
Mycologist, activist, author and songwriter Richard Summerbell

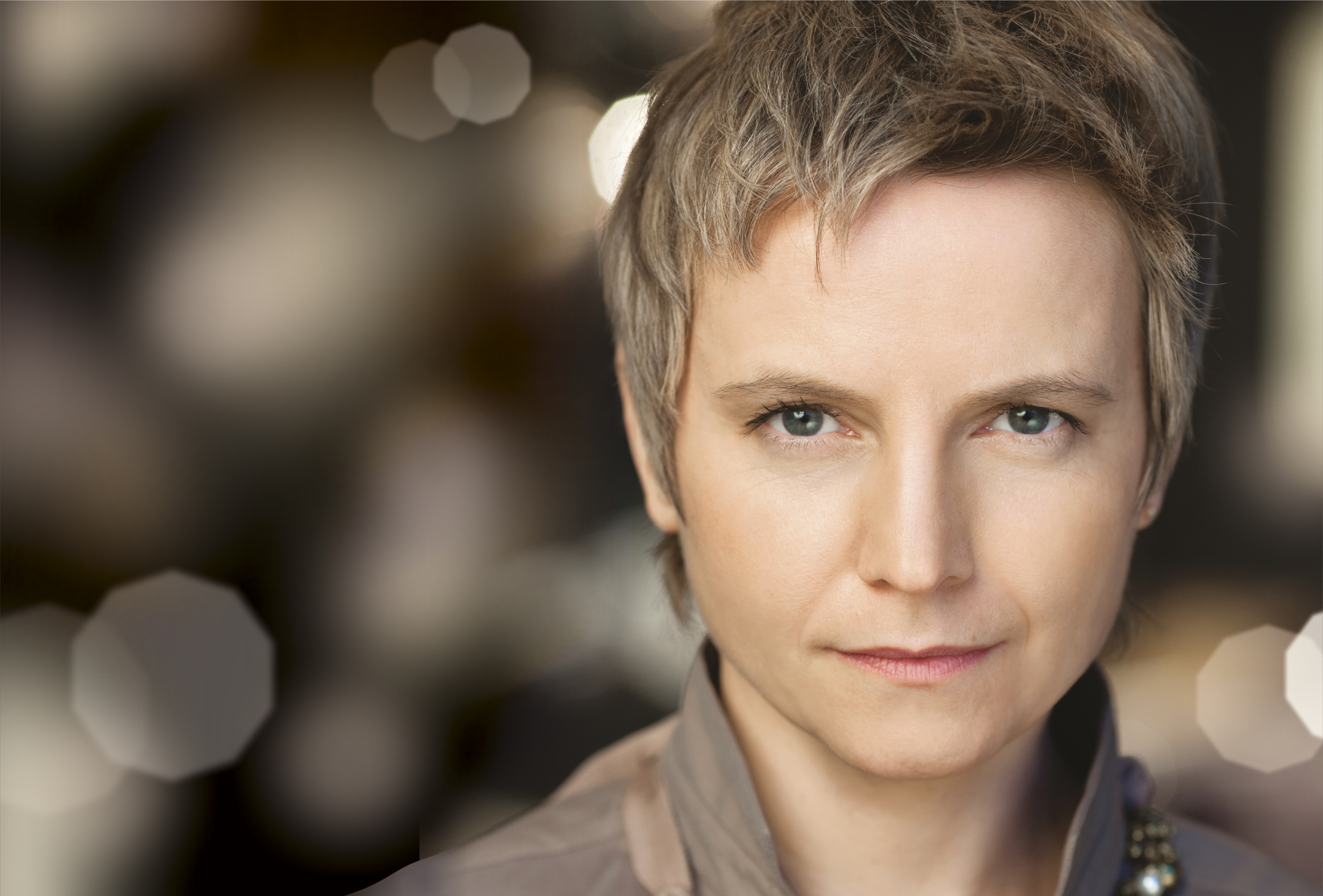
Singer, musician and poet Svetlana Surganova

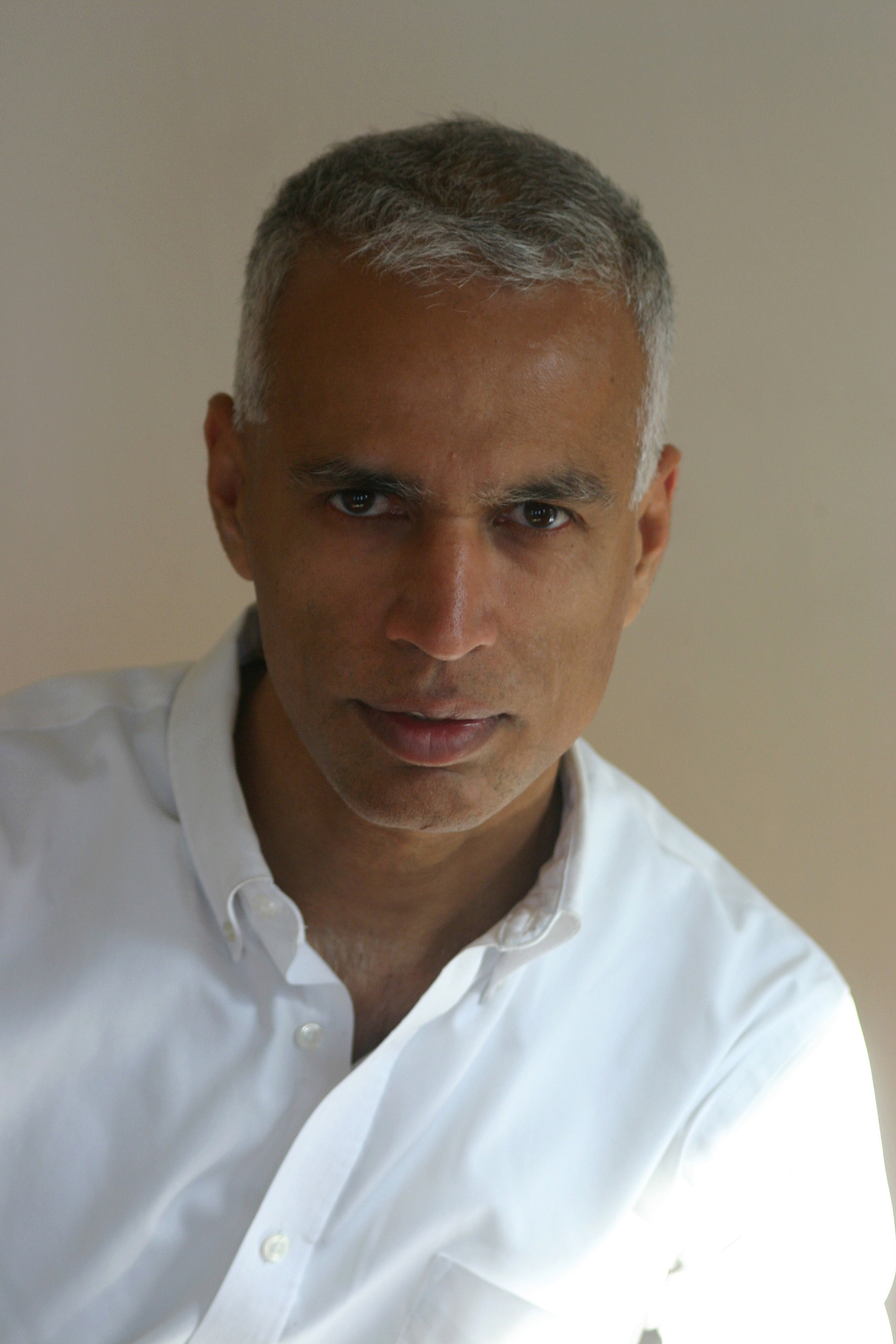
Mathematician and author Manil Suri

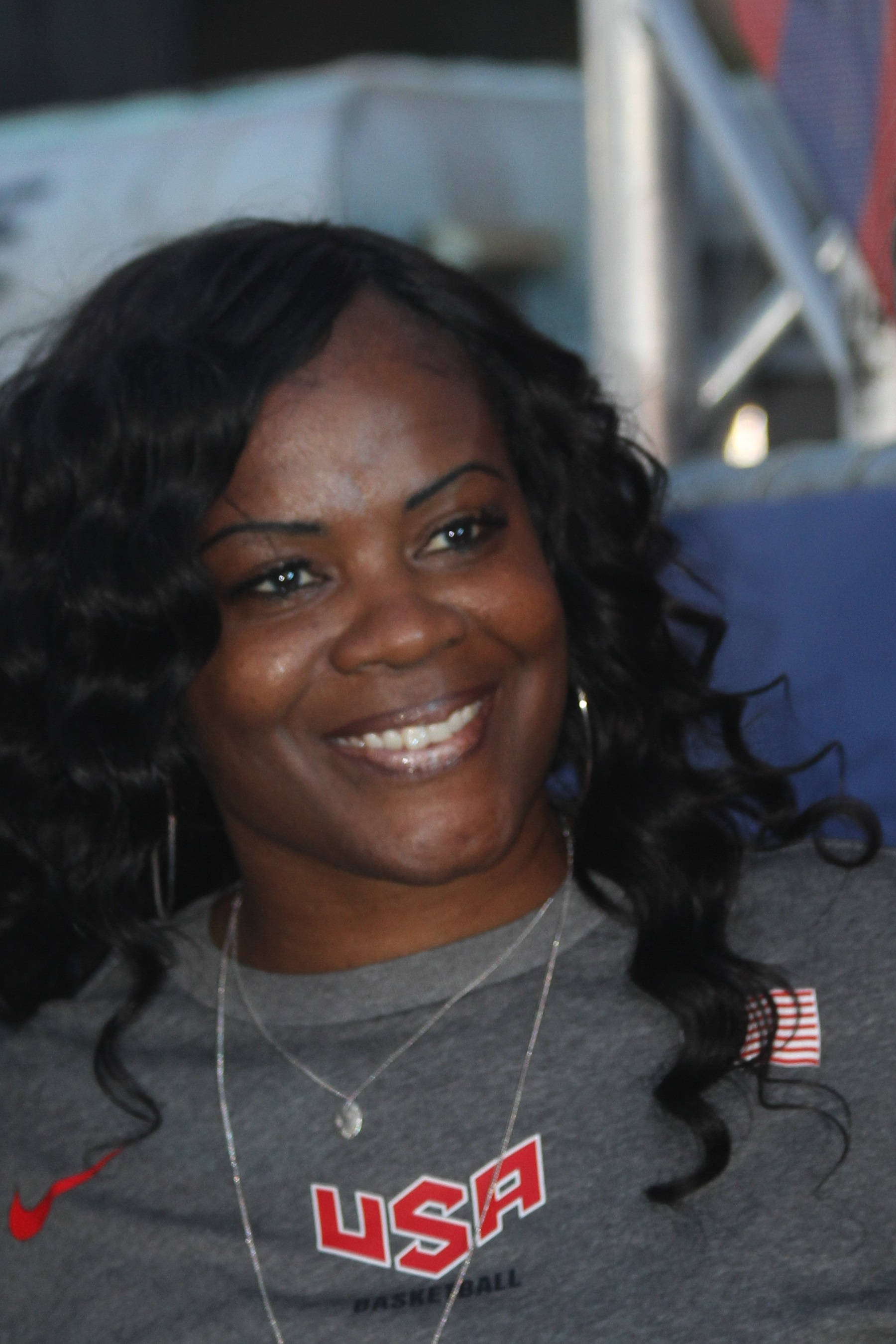
Basketball player Sheryl Swoopes

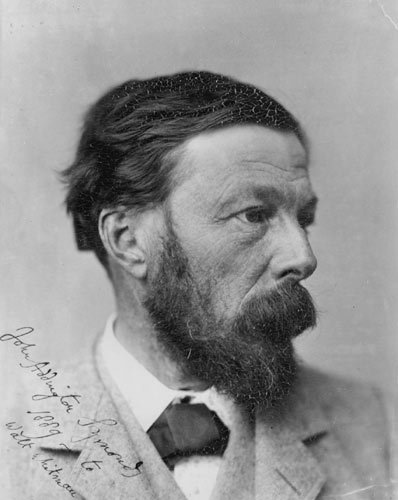
Poet John Addington Symonds

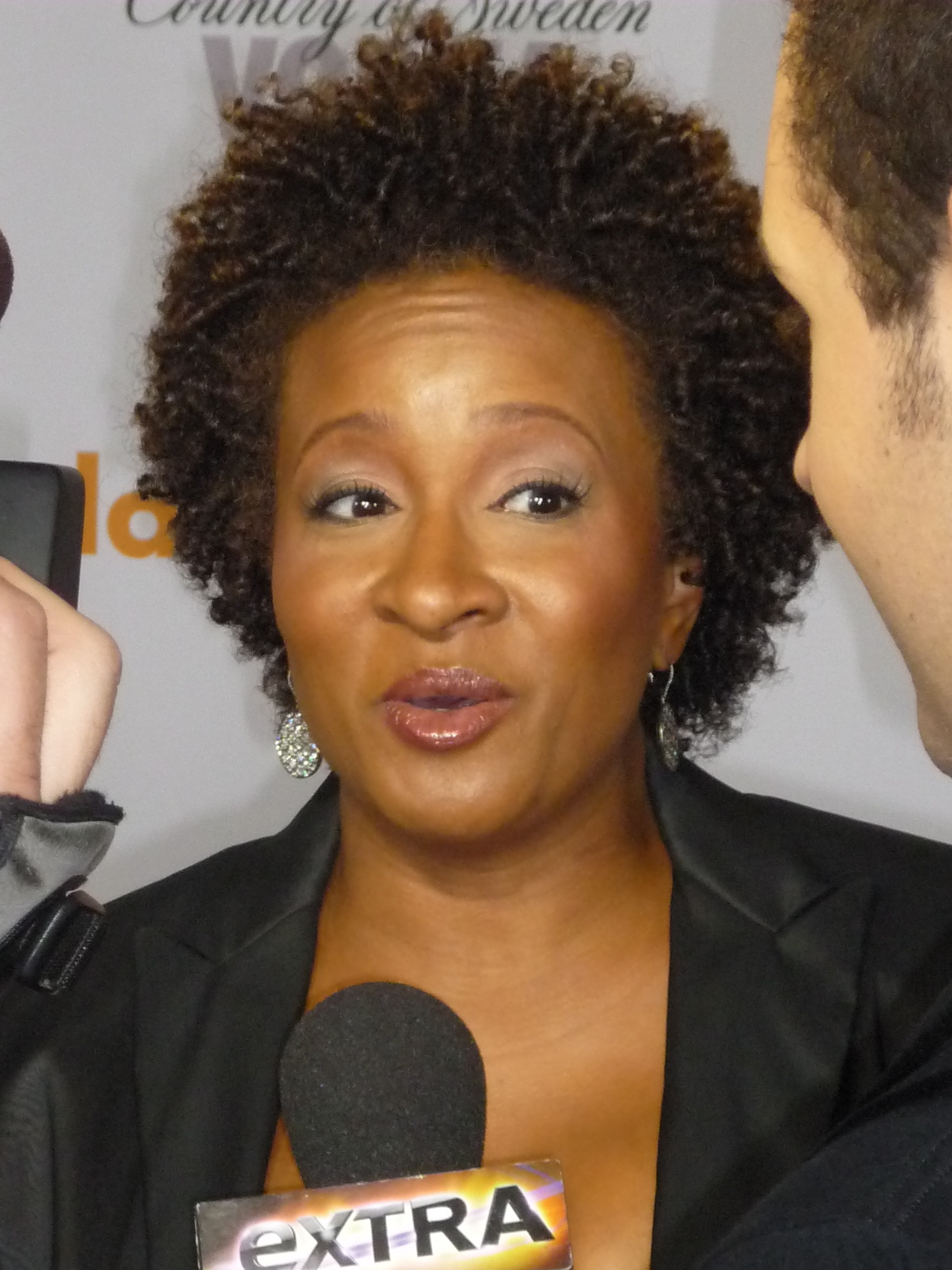
Stand-up comedian Wanda Sykes

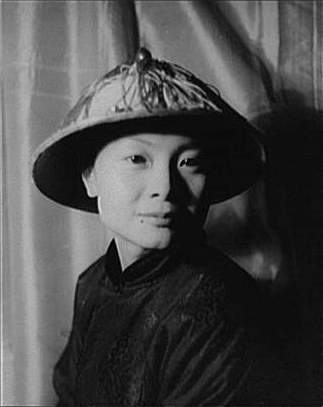
Painter and writer Mai-Mai Sze

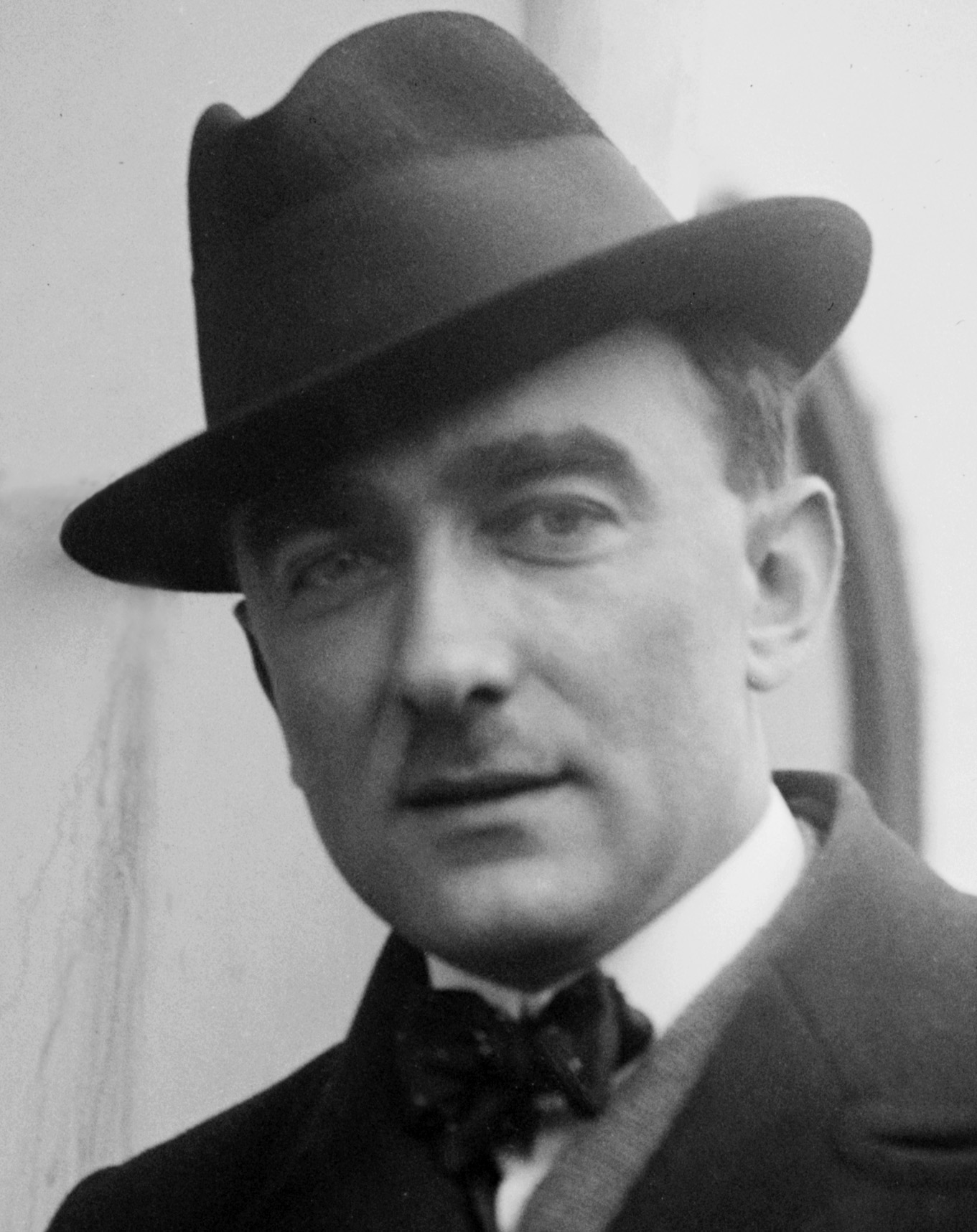
Composer Karol Szymanowski

Name	Lifetime	Nationality	Notable as	Notes
Harel Skaat	b. 1981	Israeli	Pop singer	G
Gro Skartveit	b. 1965	Norwegian	Politician	L
Skin	b. 1967	English	Musician	B
Benito Skinner	b. 1993	American	Comedian, actor	G
Stephen Skinner	b. ?	American	Politician	G
Blake Skjellerup	b. 1985	New Zealand	Short track speed skater	G
Aleksandra Skochilenko	b. 1990	Russian	Artist, musician	L
Vibeke Skofterud	1980–2018	Norwegian	Cross-country skier	L
Katarzyna Skorupa	b. 1984	Polish	Volleyball player	L
Rikke Skov	b. 1980	Danish	Handball player	L
Gustáv Slamečka	b. 1959	Czech-Slovak	Politician	G
Herman Slater	1935–1992	American	Wiccan high priest, occult-bookstore proprietor, editor, publisher, author	G
Tony Slattery	b. 1959	English	Actor, comedian	G
Jonathan Slavin	b. 1969	American	Actor	G
Slayyyter	b. 1996	American	Singer, songwriter	B
Karla Šlechtová	b. 1977	Czech	Politician	L
William Sledd	b. 1983	American	Internet personality	G
Wayne Sleep	b. 1948	English	Dancer, choreographer, actor	G
Haaz Sleiman	b. 1976	Lebanese-American	Actor	G
Hedi Slimane	b. 1968	French	Photographer, fashion designer	G
Eric Smaling	b. 1957	Dutch	Politician, agronomist	G
Alexander Smallens	1889–1972	Russian-American	Conductor, music director	G
Jeffrey Smart	1921–2013	Australian	Artist	G
Pascal Smet	b. 1967	Belgian	Politician	G
John Smid	b. ?	American	Former minister and director of Love In Action, a conversion-therapy group	G
Krzysztof Śmiszek	b. 1979	Polish	Lawyer, politician	G
Alana Smith	b. 2000	American	Skateboarder	B
Barbara Smith	b. 1946	American	Lesbian feminist, writer	L
Bessie Smith	1892–1937	American	Blues singer, musician	B
Brian J. Smith	b. 1981	American	Actor	G
Chris Smith, Baron Smith of Finsbury	b. 1951	English	Politician	G
Coral Smith	b. 1979	American	Actor	L
Cory Michael Smith	b. 1986	American	Actor	G
Debbie Smith	b. ?	English	Rock musician (Curve, Echobelly, Nightnurse)	L
Graham David Smith	b. 1937	American	Artist, writer	G
Gregory White Smith	1951–2014	American	Biographer	G
Harley Quinn Smith	b. 1999	American	Actor, musician	B
Iain Smith	b. 1960	Scottish	Politician	G
Jack Smith	1932–1989	American	Film director, actor	G
Jerry Smith	1943–1987	American	Football player	G
Justice Smith	b. 1995	American	Actor	G
Lillian Smith	1897–1966	American	Author	L
Liz Smith	1923–2017	American	Gossip columnist	B
Margaret Smith	b. 1961	Scottish	Politician	L
Mary Rozet Smith	1868–1934	American	Philanthropist	L
Michael V. Smith	b. ?	Canadian	Writer, filmmaker	G
Nadine Smith	b. ?	American	LGBT activist, executive director of Equality Florida	L
Neil Smith	b. ?	Canadian	Writer	G
Sam Smith	b. 1992	English	Singer	G
Shepard Smith	b. 1964	American	TV news anchor	G
Tammy Smith	b. 1963	American	U.S. Army Officer	L
Tony Stratton Smith	1933–1987	English	Rock music manager, entrepreneur	G
Tucker Smith	1936–1988	American	Actor, dancer, singer	G
Warren Allen Smith	1921–2017	American	LGBT rights activist, writer	G
Willi Smith	1948–1987	American	Fashion designer	G
Willow Smith	b. 2000	American	Singer, songwriter, actor, dancer	B
George Smitherman	b. 1963	Canadian	Politician	G
Benjamin Smoke	1960–1999	American	Musician	G
Jussie Smollett	b. 1982	American	Actor, singer and photographer	G
Pamela Sneed	b. ?	American	Poet, artist	L
Jack Snow	1907–1956	American	Science fiction, fantasy, horror writer	G
Joan Snyder	b. 1940	American	Painter	B
Stephen Snyder-Hill	b. 1970	American	Soldier, activist	G
Anthony Veasna So	1992–2020	American	Writer	G
Lota de Macedo Soares	1910–1967	Brazilian	Landscape designer	L
Antoni Sobański	1898–1941	Polish	Journalist, writer	G
Jill Sobule	1959–2025	American	Singer-songwriter	B
Socalled	b. 1976	Canadian	Rapper	G
Richard Socarides	b. 1954	American	Politician, businessman	G
Socrates	470-399 BC	Athenian-Greek	Philosopher	G
Soenghyang	b. 1948	American	Zen master	L
Harriet Sohmers Zwerling	1928–2019	American	Writer	B
Soju	b. 1991	South Korean-American	Drag artist	G
Valerie Solanas	1936–1988	American	Radical feminist, writer, attempted to kill artist Andy Warhol	L
Kamal Al-Solaylee	b. 1964	Yemeni-Canadian	Journalist, writer	G
Funeka Soldaat	b. ?	South African	Community activist	L
Pablo Soler Frost	b. 1965	Mexican	Writer	G
Suzy Solidor	1900–1983	French	Singer, actor	L
Joe Solmonese	b. 1965	American	LGBT rights activist	G
Andrew Solomon	b. 1963	American	Writer	G
Simeon Solomon	1840–1905	English	Painter	G
Polyxena Solovyova	1867–1924	Russian	Poet, illustrator	L
Joey Soloway	b. 1965	American	TV creator, showrunner, director, writer	B
Alex Somers	b. 1984	American	Producer, artist, musician (Jónsi & Alex)	G
Lord Henry Arthur George Somerset	1851–1926	English	Aristocrat	G
Jason Somerville	b. 1987	American	Poker player	G
Jimmy Somerville	b. 1961	Scottish	Pop musician	G
Konstantin Somov	1869–1939	Russian	Illustrator, painter	G
Suzanna Son	b. 1995	American	Actor	L
Stephen Sondheim	1930–2021	American	Musical theater composer and lyricist	G
Karan Soni	b. 1989	Indian-American	Actor, comedian	G
Wim Sonneveld	1917–1974	Dutch	Cabaret performer	G
Susan Sontag	1933–2004	American	Writer	L
Kaikhosru Shapurji Sorabji	1892–1988	English	Composer, music critic, pianist, writer	G
Eric Sorensen	b. 1976	American	Politician	G
Gab Sorère	1870–1961	French	Art promoter, set designer, filmmaker, choreographer	L
Renata Sorrah	b. 1947	Brazilian	Actor	B
Martin Sorrondeguy	b. 1967	American	Punk rock musician (Los Crudos, Limp Wrist), filmmaker	G
Emilce Sosa	b. 1987	Argentine	Volleyball player	L
Ezra Sosa	b. 2000	American	Professional dancer	G
Sergey Sosedov	b. 1968	Russian	Journalist, music critic, TV personality	G
Jock Soto	b. 1965	American	Ballet dancer	G
Daniel Sotomayor	1958–1992	American	Political cartoonist	G
Diana Souhami	b. 1940	English	Writer	L
Azariah Southworth	b. 1987	American	Christian TV host	G
Ana Carolina Sousa	b. 1974	Brazilian	Singer-songwriter	B
Osmel Sousa	b. 1946	Cuban-Venezuelan	Beauty pageant entrepreneur	G
Douglas Souza	b. 1995	Brazilian	Volleyball player	G
Felipa de Souza	1556–1600	Brazilian	Victim of Catholic Inquisition, LGBT symbol	L
Laís Souza	b. 1988	Brazilian	Gymnast, skier	L
Lívia Renata Souza	b. 1991	Brazilian	Mixed martial artist	L
Katie Sowers	b. 1986	American	First openly gay NFL coach	L
Kevin Spacey	b. 1959	American	Actor	G
Vincenzo Spadafora	b. 1974	Italian	Politician	G
Robert Spagnoletti	b. ?	American	Attorney General, lawyer	G
Jens Spahn	b. 1980	German	Politician	G
Douglas Spain	b. 1974	American	Actor, director, producer	G
Nancy Spain	1917–1964	English	Journalist, broadcaster	L
Anna Span	b. 1971	English	Pornographic director	B
Sam Sparro	b. 1982	Australian	Pop singer, songwriter, producer	G
Allan Spear	1937–2008	American	Politician	G
Doug Spearman	b. 1962	American	Actor	G
Pat Spearman	b. 1955	American	Politician, cleric, veteran	L
Peter Spears	b. 1965	American	Actor, filmmaker	G
Wieland Speck	b. 1951	German	Film director	G
Cheryl Spector	1958–2007	American	LGBT rights activist	L
Darren Spedale	b. ?	American	Businessman; founder of StartOut and FamilyByDesign	G
Colin Spencer	b. 1933	English	Writer, journalist, broadcaster	G
Mark Spencer	b. ?	English	Forensic botanist	G
Tom Spencer	b. 1948	English	Politician	G
Muffin Spencer-Devlin	b. 1954	American	Golfer	L
Stephen Spender	1909–1995	English	Writer	G
Andrea Sperling	b. 1968/69	American	Film producer	L
Jack Spicer	1925–1965	American	Poet	G
Stephen Spinella	b. 1956	American	Actor	G
Kevin Spirtas	b. 1962	American	Actor	G
Sherida Spitse	b. 1990	Dutch	Footballer	L
Adele Spitzeder	1832–1895	German	Actor, folk singer, con artist	L
Dori Spivak	b. 1968	Israeli	Judge	G
Edward Spofford	1931–2014	American	Professor	G
Mariasilvia Spolato	1935–2018	Italian	LGBT rights activist, magazine publisher, editor	L
Joel Spolsky	b. 1965	American	Software engineer, writer	G
Casey Spooner	b. 1970	American	Pop musician (Fischerspooner)	G
Lucy Spraggan	b. 1991	English	Singer-songwriter	L
William Spratling	1900–1967	American-Mexican	Silversmith, artist	G
Lorrie Sprecher	b. 1960	American	Writer, rock musician	L
Dusty Springfield	1939–1999	English	Pop musician	B
Annie Sprinkle	b. 1954	American	Pornographic actress, writer, performance artist	B
Maud Hunt Squire	1873–1954	American	Painter, printmaker	L
Ron Squires	1951–1993	American	Politician	G
Dragoslav Srejović	1931–1996	Serbian	Archeologist, historian	G
Pam St. Clement	b. 1942	English	Actor	B
Matthew Stadler	b. 1959	American	Writer	G
Robert Stadlober	b. 1982	Austrian	Actor, rock musician	G
Peter Staley	b. 1961	American	Political activist	G
David Staller	b. 1955	American	Theatre director, actor	G
Megan Stalter	b. 1990	American	Comedian	B
George Stambolian	1938–1991	American	Poet	G
Sam Stanley	b. 1991	English	Rugby player	G
Nikki Stanton	b. 1990	American	Soccer player	L
A. Latham Staples	b. 1977	American	LGBT activist	G
Darren Star	b. 1961	American	TV and film producer	G
Hovi Star	b. 1986	Israeli	Singer	G
Jeffree Star	b. 1986	American	Make-up artist, media personality	G
Starhawk	b. 1951	American	Writer, teacher, activist	B
Freda Stark	1910–1999	New Zealand	Exotic dancer	L
David Starkey	b. 1945	English	Historian	G
Sławomir Starosta	b. 1965	Polish	LGBT activist, musician, journalist, publisher	G
Ellen Gates Starr	1859–1940	American	Social reformer	L
Garrison Starr	b. 1975	American	Rock musician	G
Caitlin Stasey	b. 1990	Australian	Actor	B
Pajtim Statovci	b. 1990	Kosovar-Finnish	Author	G
Jonny Staub	b. 1979	Canadian	Radio/television personality	G
Kevin Stea	b. 1969	American	Dancer, choreographer, actor, singer, model	G
Pat Steadman	b. 1964	American	Politician	G
Emma Stebbins	1815–1882	American	Artist	L
Stephanie Stebich	b. 1966	American	Art historian	L
Jan Steckel	b. 1962	American	Writer	B
Chris Stedman	b. 1987	American	Activist	G
Louis Stedman-Bryce	b. 1974	British	Politician	G
Ashley Steel	b. 1959	British	Businessperson	L
Ryan Steele	b. 1990	American	Actor	G
Dré Steemans	1954–2009	Belgian	TV and radio host	G
Guusje Steenhuis	b. 1992	Dutch	Judoka	L
Liz Stefanics	b. 1950	American	Politician	L
Joey Stefano	1968–1994	American	Pornographic actor	G
Joseph Steffan	b. 1964	American	Lawyer, activist	G
Darren Stein	b. 1971	American	Film director, screenwriter	G
Gertrude Stein	1874–1946	American	Writer	L
Seymour Stein	b. 1942	American	Entrepreneur, music executive	G
Larry Steinbachek	1960–2017	English	Pop musician (Bronski Beat)	G
Marianne Steinbrecher	b. 1983	Brazilian	Volleyball player	L
Andreas Steinhöfel	b. 1962	German	Writer, translator	G
Andrzej Stękała	b. 1995	Polish	Ski jumper	G
Amandla Stenberg	b. 1998	American	Actor	L
Birgitta Stenberg	1932–2014	Swedish	Author, translator, illustrator	B
Eric Stenbock	1858–1895	German	Poet, writer	G
Fay Stender	1932–1980	American	Lawyer, prisoner rights advocate	L
Nicole Stéphane	1923–2007	French	Actor	L
Darryl Stephens	b. 1974	American	Actor	G
Helen Stephens	1918–1994	American	Track and field athlete, double Olympic champion	G
Ian Stephens	1955–1996	Canadian	Poet, spoken word artist, journalist	G
Todd Stephens	b. ?	American	Film director, writer, producer	G
Zack Stephenson	b. ?	American	Politician	B
Sandy Stern	b. ?	American	Film producer	G
Friedrich Wilhelm von Steuben	1730–1794	Prussian	Army general	G
Marsha Stevens	b. 1952	American	Contemporary Christian musician	L
Noreen Stevens	b. 1962	Canadian	Comics artist	L
Sufjan Stevens	b. 1975	American	Singer-songwriter, musician	G
Harold Stevenson	1929–2018	American	Painter	G
Tim Stevenson	b. 1945	Canadian	Politician	G
Breanna Stewart	b. 1994	American	Basketball player	L
Dennis Cleveland Stewart	1947–1994	American	Actor	G
James B. Stewart	b. 1952	American	Lawyer, writer	G
Jamie Stewart	b. 1978	American	Rock musician (Xiu Xiu)	B
Kevin Stewart	b. ?	Scottish	Politician	G
Kristen Stewart	b. 1990	American	Actor	B
Peter Stickles	b. 1976	American	Actor	G
David Ogden Stiers	b. 1942	American	Actor	G
Lidia S. Stiglich	b. 1969	American	Associate Justice of the Supreme Court of Nevada	L
Robert Stigwood	1934–2016	Australian-British	Music entrepreneur, film producer	G
Andrew Stimpson	b. 1980	Scottish	HIV patient	G
Michael Stipe	b. 1960	American	Singer-songwriter (R.E.M.)	B
Sarah Stirk	b. ?	British	Television presenter	L
Charles Warren Stoddard	1843–1909	American	Author, editor	G
Thomas Stoddard	1949–1997	American	Lawyer, gay rights activist	G
Demi Stokes	b. 1991	English	Footballer	L
James Stoll	1936–1994	American	Clergy	G
Kim Stolz	b. 1983	American	Model	L
Nic Stone	b. 1985	American	Writer	B
Randy Stone	1958–2007	American	Actor, casting director	G
Alyson Stoner	b. 1993	American	Actor, singer, dancer, model	B
Casey Stoney	b. 1982	English	Footballer	L
Toni Storm	b. 1995	Australian	Professional wrestler	B
Beth Storry	b. 1978	English	Field hockey goalkeeper	L
Samantha Stosur	b. 1984	Australian	Tennis player	L
Zoë Strachan	b. 1975	Scottish	Novelist, journalist	L
Lytton Strachey	1880–1932	English	Writer, critic	G
Vitória Strada	b. 1996	Brazilian	Actor	L
Jeffery Straker	b. ?	Canadian	Folk-pop singer-songwriter	G
Mats Strandberg	b. 1976	Swedish	Author	G
Steve Strange	1959–2015	Welsh	Pop singer (Visage)	B
Zoe Strauss	b. 1970	American	Photographer	L
Jérémy Stravius	b. 1988	French	Swimmer	G
Billy Strayhorn	1915–1967	American	Jazz composer, arranger, musician	G
Maryan Street	b. 1955	New Zealand	Politician	L
Wes Streeting	b. 1983	English	Labour politician	G
Rikki Streicher	1922–1994	American	LGBT activist, lesbian bar owner	L
Keith Strickland	b. 1953	American	Rock musician (The B-52's)	G
Ray Stricklyn	1928–2002	American	Film actor	G
Luke Strong	b. 1993	English	Trampoline gymnast	B
Matěj Stropnický	b. 1983	Czech	Politician	G
Patrick Strudwick	b. ?	British	Journalist	G
Martina Strutz	b. 1981	German	Pole vaulter	L
Julian Stryjkowski	1905–1996	Polish	Journalist	G
Susan Stryker	b. ?	American	LGBT professor, historian, author	L
Jason Stuart	b. 1969	American	Actor	G
Rennae Stubbs	b. 1971	Australian	Tennis player	L
Gerry Studds	1937–2006	American	Politician	G
Hans-Georg Stümke	1941–2002	German	Author, teacher, historian, publisher	G
Carla Suárez Navarro	b. 1988	Spanish	Tennis player	L
Michael Sucsy	b. 1973	American	Director, screenwriter, producer	G
Amy Sueyoshi	b. ?	American	Associate dean, historian	L
Rebecca Sugar	b. 1987	American	Animator, composer, director, show creator	B
Fumie Suguri	b. 1980	Japanese	Figure skater	B
Lucius Cornelius Sulla	138–78 BC	Roman	General, consul, Roman dictator	G
Andrew Sullivan	b. 1963	English	Journalist	G
Erica Sullivan	b. 2000	American	Swimmer	L
Kathleen Sullivan	b. 1955	American	Professor of Law	L
Larry Sullivan	b. 1970	American	Actor	G
Lou Sullivan	1951–1991	American	Author, 1st transgender man to publicly identify as gay	G
Richard Summerbell	b. 1956	Canadian	Mycologist, LGBT rights activist	G
Ben Summerskill	b. 1961	English	LGBT rights activist	G
Siri Sunde	b. 1958	Norwegian	Church of Norway priest, theologian	L
Pia Sundhage	b. 1960	Swedish	Footballer, coach	L
Michael Sundin	1961–1989	English	Trampolinist, TV presenter, actor	G
Per Sundnes	b. 1966	Norwegian	TV personality, journalist	G
Ron Suresha	b. ?	American	Writer	G
Svetlana Surganova	b. 1968	Russian	Rock singer (Nochnye Snaipery), musician, poet	L
Manil Suri	b. 1959	Indian-American	Mathematician, author	G
Grady Sutton	1906–1995	American	Actor	G
Alicia Svigals	b. 1963	American	Violinist (The Klezmatics)	L
Lennart Swahn	1927–2008	Swedish	Journalist, radio and TV personality	G
Ryan Jamaal Swain	b. ?	American	Actor, dancer	G
William Dorsey Swann	1860–c. 1925	American	LGBT activist	G
Chlöe Swarbrick	b. 1994	New Zealand	Politician, entrepreneur	L
Oscar Swartz	b. 1959	Swedish	Writer, entrepreneur	G
Swe Zin Htet	b. 1998/1999	Burmese	Model, Miss Universe Myanmar 2019, first ever gay Miss Universe contestant	L
Terry Sweeney	b. 1960	American	Actor, screenwriter	G
May Swenson	1913–1989	American	Poet	L
Ember Swift	b. ?	Canadian	Folk-rock musician	L
Kara Swisher	b. 1963	American	Technology business journalist, co-founder of Recode	L
Sheryl Swoopes	b. 1971	American	Basketball player	B
Mattilda Bernstein Sycamore	b. ?	American	Writer	G
Syd	b. 1992	American	Singer	L
Stacy Sykora	b. 1977	American	Volleyball player	L
Sylvester	1947–1988	American	Disco and soul singer-songwriter	G
John Addington Symonds	1840–1893	English	Poet, literary critic	G
Scott Symons	b. 1933	Canadian	Writer	G
Wanda Sykes	b. 1964	American	Comedian, actor	L
Tuva Syvertsen	b. 1983	Norwegian	Singer, musician	L
Marcin Szczygielski	b. 1972	Polish	Writer, journalist, graphic designer	G
Mai-Mai Sze	1909–1992	Chinese	Painter, writer	L
Stanisław Szebego	1891–1944	Polish	Filmmaker, composer	G
Gábor Szetey	b. 1968	Hungarian	Politician	G
Paulo Szot	b. 1969	Brazilian	Opera baritone, actor	G
Magda Szubanski	b. 1961	Australian	Actor, comedian	L
Karol Szymanowski	1882–1937	Polish	Classical composer, musician	G

== See also ==
- List of gay, lesbian or bisexual people
