= Gay marriage (disambiguation) =

Same-sex marriage, also known as gay marriage, is the marriage of two people of the same sex or gender.

Gay marriage may also refer to:

- Gay Marriage (Rauch book), 2004 book by Jonathan Rauch
- Gay Marriage: For Better or for Worse?, 2006 book by William N. Eskridge Jr. and Darren R. Spedale
