= Riana Lynn =

American entrepreneur

- Education: University of North Carolina at Chapel Hill (2008); Northwestern University (master's)
- Occupations: Entrepreneur, inventor
- Known for: Founder of Journey Foods and FoodTrace
- Title: Founder and chief executive officer, Journey Foods

Riana Lynn is an American entrepreneur and inventor. She is the founder and CEO of the software company Journey Foods, which uses an "in-house automated scientist," Journey AI, to create product formulations for food companies. She also founded FoodTrace, a Chicago-based technology platform that helped food businesses manage their supply chains and see where their food was sourced.

== Early life ==
Riana is a 5th generation food entrepreneur. She grew up in Evanston, Illinois, with her mom and close with grandparents on both sides who worked in food activism. Her grandma, Radha Gloria McCartney is heralded as one of the first black leaders in yoga in the 1960s–70s United States movement. She attended Roycemore School and Evanston Township High School, where she captained two consecutive state championship track teams; as a senior at the 2004 Class AA state meet leading the team as a caption and top performer in discus and shot put.

== Education ==
Lynn was a student-athlete at the University of North Carolina at Chapel Hill and graduated in 2008. She learned web development while studying biology there. She later interned at the White House while studying for a master's degree at Northwestern University.

== Career ==
While in graduate school, Lynn interned at the White House in the Office of Public Engagement and the Council on Women and Girls.

In 2012 she founded Rivive Group, a technology consulting firm, which was later acquired. In 2014 she took a behind-the-scenes role in web development and strategy with investor Marcus Lemonis for his CNBC show The Profit.

She founded FoodTrace in 2014. In 2015 she was a Google-funded Code2040 Entrepreneur in Residence.

In 2018 she started Journey Foods, an frontier data and research lab powering the Journey AI platform that supports research and development for ingredient suppliers, consumer packaged goods companies and manufacturers. In 2022 she and Carol Schmitz were granted U.S. Patent 11,521,734, "Recipe generation based on neural network," assigned to Journey Foods.

== Personal life ==
Lynn serves on the board of StartOut. In a 2026 Advocate cover story, she discussed the leading LGBTQ entrepreneurs.
