= Gay Marriage: For Better or for Worse? =

2006 book by William Eskridge and Darren Spedale

Gay Marriage: For Better or for Worse? What We've Learned from the Evidence
- Cover of the first edition
- Author: William N. Eskridge Jr. and Darren R. Spedale
- Language: English
- Subject: Same-sex marriage
- Publisher: Oxford University Press
- Publication date: 2006
- Publication place: United States
- Media type: Print
- Pages: 336
- ISBN: 978-0195187519

Gay Marriage: For Better or for Worse? What We've Learned from the Evidence is a 2006 book about same-sex marriage and civil partnership by William N. Eskridge Jr. and Darren R. Spedale, published by Oxford University Press.

== Reviews ==
- Cole, David (2 July 2009). "The Same-Sex Future". The New York Review of Books. Vol. 56, no. 11. pp. 12–16. ISSN 0028-7504.
- Pinello, Daniel R. (2008). "Book Reviews". Law & Society Review. 42 (1): 227–229. doi:10.1111/j.1540-5893.2008.00339_1.x. ISSN 0023-9216. JSTOR 29734110.
- Smith, Raymond A. (2007). "Book Reviews". Political Science Quarterly. 122 (2): 329–330. doi:10.1002/j.1538-165X.2007.tb01626.x. ISSN 0032-3195. JSTOR 20202861.
- Weston, Beau (January 2007). "Social & Behavioral Sciences". Choice. Vol. 44, no. 5. p. 909. ISSN 0009-4978. ProQuest 225748272.
- Zabcik, Brian (November 2006). "Wedding Planners". The American Lawyer. Vol. 28, no. 11. pp. 75–76. ISSN 0162-3397. Archived from the original on 27 November 2006.
