= Pablo Soler Frost =

Mexican writer

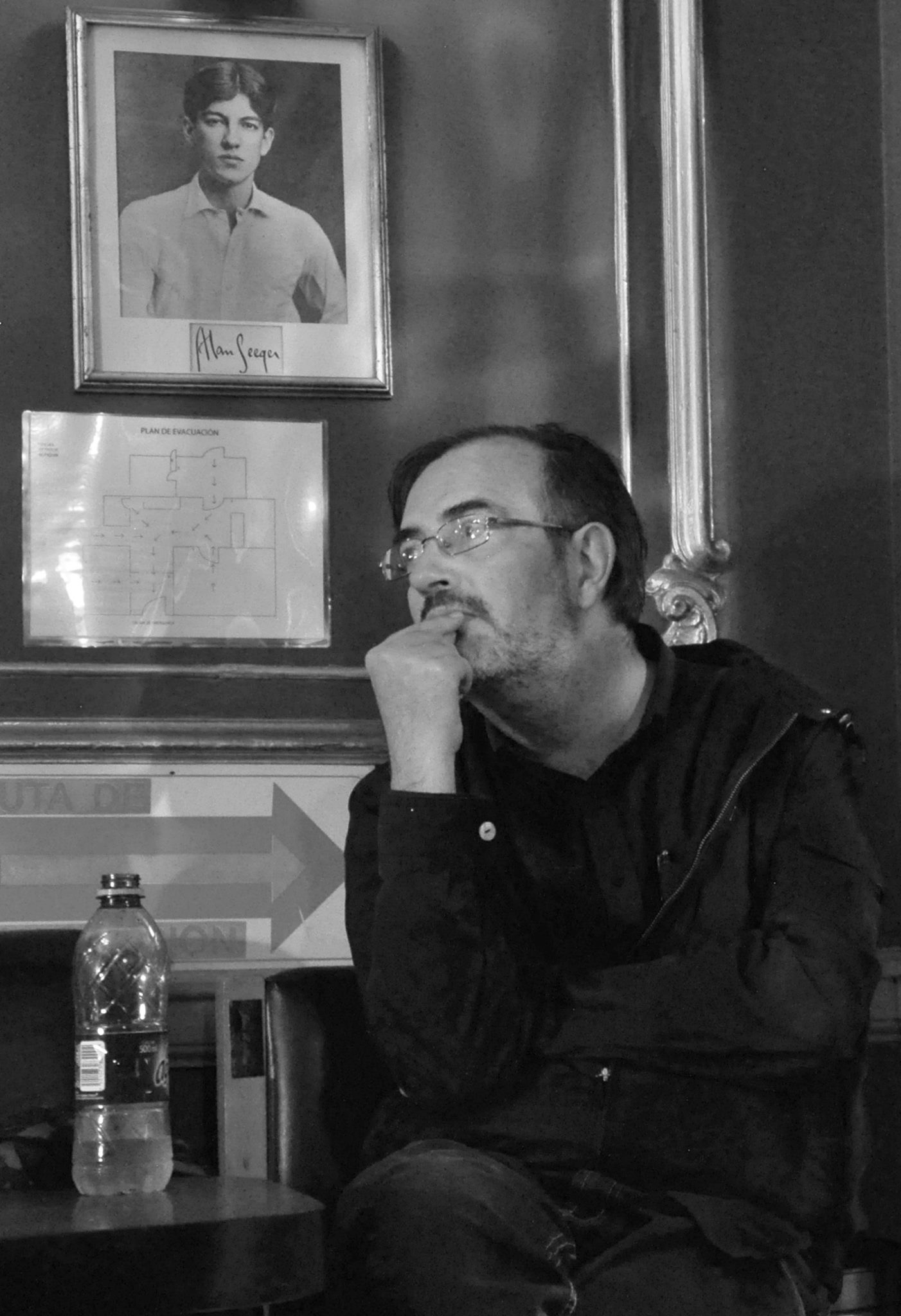
- Born: July 10, 1965 (age 61); Mexico City, Mexico.
- Education: El Colegio de Mexico
- Occupations: Novelist, essayist, short story writer, playwright, poet
- Writing career
- Language: Spanish, English, Catalan, French, German
- Period: 1980–present

Pablo Soler Frost (born October 7, 1965) is a Mexican novelist, essayist, translator, playwright, short-story and screen writer. As a polyglot (he speaks fluently Spanish, German, English, French and Catalan), he has translated into Spanish several works and poems by Shakespeare, Walpole, Walter Scott, Shelley, John Henry Newman, Joseph Conrad, Robert Frost, Rainer M. Rilke, Theodor Daübler and Joanna Walsh.

He was awarded the 1987 National Youth Prize granted by Mexican government, and the 2009 Colima Narrative Prize from the National Institute of Fine Artes (Mexico). He has been a member of the National Artists System of Mexico.

His literary contributions to world-renowned artists such as the like of Gabriel Orozco and Anish Kapoor are well known.

== Early life and career ==
Pablo Soler Frost was born in Mexico City. He is the first son of Martí Soler and Elsa Cecilia Frost, both known as translators and scholars. As a child, he was a collector, which might explain the many interests portrayed in his writings from insects and fossils to legends of the silver screen. Very early he was briefly encouraged by Isaac Asimov; other writers with whom he corresponded were Ernst Jünger and Álvaro Mutis, but his true mentors were the Mexican writers Salvador Elizondo and Hugo Hiriart.

Pablo graduated from The College of Mexico in 1992 with a dissertation on "The symbol and its political roles in international relations".

In 2007 he was invited by Mexican director Juan Carlos Martin to write the screenplay for a road movie about Americans in Mexico. The resulting Film, 40 días (2008) was received with hostility, even though respected Mexican critics such as Rafael Aviña and Fernanda Solórzano praised it, as much as John Anderson in Variety.

He writes about English, German and Mexican writers and culture in journals like Conspiratio, Ixtus, Letras Libres, Líneas de fuga, Nexos, Revista de la Universidad and La Tempestad, among others. He also collaborates in Mexican newspapers El Universal, Reforma and La Jornada. The same topics he has explored in lectures around Mexico, USA, Argentina, Costa Rica, Japan, Australia, Canada, Norway, Denmark and Great Britain.

== List of Works ==
Novels:

- De batallas México, SEP/Crea, 1984.
- Legión (Xalapa, Universidad Veracruzana, 1991 (2ª. edición, México, Conaculta, 2006; 3ª. edición, México, Conaculta, 2008; 4ª. edición, México, Nieve de Chamoy, 2018)).
- La mano derecha (México, Joaquín Mortiz, 1993 (2ª. edición, México, Conaculta, 2008)).
- Malebolge (México, Tusquets, 2001).
- Edén (México, Editorial Jus, 2003).
- 1767 (México, Joaquín Mortiz, 2004 (2ª. edición, 2005)).
- Yerba americana (México, Era, 2008).
- La soldadesca ebria del emperador (México, Editorial Jus, 2010).
- Vampiros aztecas (México, Taller Ditoria, 2015).

Essays:

- Apuntes para una historia de la cabeza de Goya luego de su muerte, (Tlalpan, Editorial Otumba, 1996).
- Oriente de los insectos mexicanos (México, UNAM, 1996 (2ª. edición, Aldus, 2001)).
- Cartas de Tepoztlán (México, Era, 1997 (2ª. reimpresión, Era, 2000)).
- Acerca de «El Señor de los Anillos» (México, Libros del Umbral, 2001).
- Adivina o te devoro. El enigma de los símbolos (México, Fondo de Cultura Económica, 2013).

Short-stories:

- El sitio de Bagdad y otras aventuras del doctor Greene (México, Ediciones Heliópolis, 1994).
- Birmania (México, Libros del Umbral, 1999).
- El misterio de los tigres (México, Era, 2002).
- Santiago Tlatelolco (México, Taller Ditoria, 2015).

Poetry:

- La doble águila (México, UAM, 1997).

Translations:

- Joseph Conrad, Acerca de la pérdida del Titanic (México, Libros del Umbral, 1998).
- Horace Walpole. Acerca del gusto moderno en la jardinería (México, Libros del Umbral, 1998).
- Joseph Conrad. Polonia y Rusia (México, Libros del Umbral, 1999).
- Walter Scott. Faros. Viaje alrededor de Escocia en 1814 (México, Libros del Umbral, 2001).
- John Henry Newman. Acerca de la idea de la universidad (México, Libros del Umbral, 2002).
