= Lorrie Sprecher =

American novelist

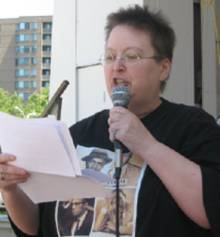
- Lorrie Sprecher reading at Syracuse Stories 2011.
- Born: 18 July 1960 (age 66)
- Education: University of Maryland
- Occupations: Writer, musician
- Writing career
- Genres: novel, short story, poetry
- Website: www.lorriesprecher.com

Lorrie Sprecher (born 18 July 1960) is an American writer, musician, and activist.

== Biography ==
She holds a Ph.D. in English literature from the University of Maryland, where her dissertation was on Gertrude Stein.

Her debut novel, Sister Safety Pin, details the life of a 20-something lesbian named Melany as she struggles to come to terms with her sexuality, her lovers, her future, and her place in the changing world of punk rock. Peppered heavily with references to seminal punk bands, the novel follows Melany through a small series of relationships, attaining her undergraduate degree, and contemplating "if a lesbian... especially a punk lesbian... is supposed to get a Ph.D." Honed with sharp wit, the story unfolds against a backdrop of 1980s California, New York City, and D.C.; a time when punk rock was shifting faces and the AIDS crisis was exploding amongst the gay community. Widely reviewed, Sister Safety Pin has become a classic among its lesbian audience.

After the publication of her novel, Sprecher turned her attention to music, forming the one-woman band Sugar Rat. Her music is politically charged, most recently addressing the bombing of Afghanistan. Her debut album, Rats Have Rights, was released in 2001. In 2002, Sprecher released her follow-up to Rats, entitled The Opposite of Popular. Both albums were self-distributed and are available via iTunes or Sprecher's website. She has also contributed songs to the Revolutionary Association of the Women of Afghanistan (RAWA).

Sprecher is a vocal member of ACT UP, an organization dedicated to fighting AIDS, and has been arrested six times in Washington D.C. during various protests.

She is currently working on her third novel and an acoustic album for Sugar Rat.

== Bibliography ==
- Anxiety Attack: Short-Short Storie (Violet Ink, 1992)
- Sister Safety Pin (Firebrand Books, 1994)
- Pissing in a River (The Feminist Press, 2014)

== Discography ==
- Rats Have Rights (2001)
- The Opposite of Popular (2003)
