= Ashley Steel =

British businesswoman (born 1959)

- Born: 1959 (age 66–67)
- Education: Henley Business School
- Occupations: Former Vice-chair and global head of transport at KPMG (retired September 2014). Present: non-executive director of GoCo, National Express and the BBC

Ashley Caroline Steel (born 1959) was the vice-chair and global head of transport for KPMG (retired in the summer 2014). Currently she holds non-executive roles on the boards of National Express, GoCo and the BBC. She has been named "one of the UK's most influential gay people".

Steel has a PhD in Management from Henley.

Steel was asked to judge the Independent on Sunday's Pink List in 2010, but declined to do so.

== Recognition ==
- The Independent on Sunday Pink List 2013 (75)
- The Guardian World Pride Power List 2013 (78)
- The Independent on Sunday Pink List 2012 (44)
- The Guardian World Pride Power List 2012 (74)
- Pride London Power List 2011 (81)
- The Independent on Sunday Pink List 2008 (66)
- The Independent on Sunday Pink List 2007 (50)
- The Independent on Sunday Pink List 2006 (31)
