= Mariasilvia Spolato =

Italian LGBTQ+ rights activist

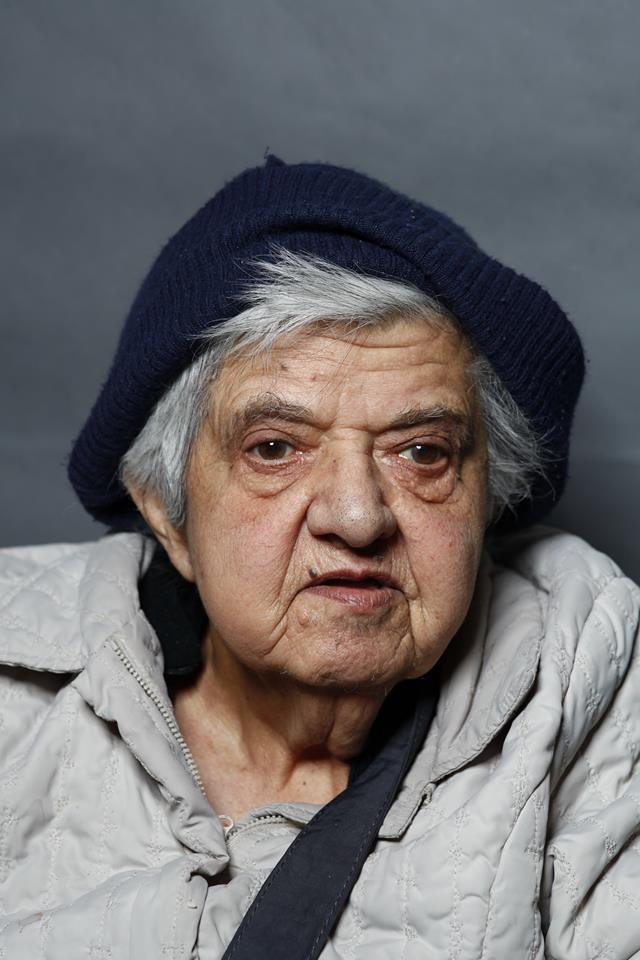
Spolato in 2018

Mariasilvia Spolato (25 June 1935 – 31 October 2018) was an Italian activist for LGBT rights, lesbian feminist, magazine founder and publisher. She was one of the pioneers of the homosexual rights movement and the first woman in Italy to publicly declare her homosexuality. For this reason she was discriminated and persecuted, losing her job as a maths school teacher in 1972. In the 1970s Spolato was also active in the "Pompeo Magno" feminist collective in Rome. In 1971 she was one of the founders of the organization Fuori! ("Out!"), acronym of Fronte Unitario Omosessuale Rivoluzionario Italiano (United Revolutionary Italian Homosexual Front) and of its eponymous periodical.

in 2024, movie (Io non sono nessuno) based on her life was written and directed by Geraldine Ottier

Spolato is the founder of the first homosexual liberation group in Italy. The manifesto of the group states:

In the month of August [1971, ed.] the Homosexual Liberation Front was formed in Rome.

The fundamental aim of the front is to oppose discrimination against homosexuals considered as a further technique of repression of organized society. The front naturally allies itself with all those groups that fight against social, ideological and sexual racism.

The front does not want to sexually isolate homosexuality as a fact identifying a certain type of person, but rather wants to reject any attempt to exploit the freedom of sexual thought achieved by a few individuals today as a weapon against them.

We are for the free expression of sexuality as well as any other means of communication of the human person. We will oppose with all means the violence carried out by the repressive society against love between people

Between 1973 and 1974 the FLO published a weekly bulletin called "LIB", the first issue of which was dedicated to self-awareness. It is a mimeographed and typed newspaper. The bulletin, as Daniela Danna recalls, "documents the journalistic terrorism with which the news of the wounding of a lesbian woman in Rome was given, attributed to the "shady world connected to organized vice" that lesbians supposedly constitute". The protest against the press takes place with an unauthorized demonstration outside a cinema where films about women are shown. The slogans are: "Lesbians, let's unite", "Women, let's learn to love each other", "No to ghettos", "Let's go outside".

In 1973 the FLO organized a debate on the topic of "Love between women" in which men were admitted only if accompanied, to reflect on the low female turnout at FUORI!, and instead concentrated on the relationship between sexuality and revolution. The FLO also organized a congress on sexuality on 27 and 28 April 1974 in Rome, at the headquarters of the Radical Party, together with the Women's Liberation Movement and other feminist groups, in particular on the issues of the social and class situation of homosexuals, information and mass media, law, and medical oppression.
