= StartOut =

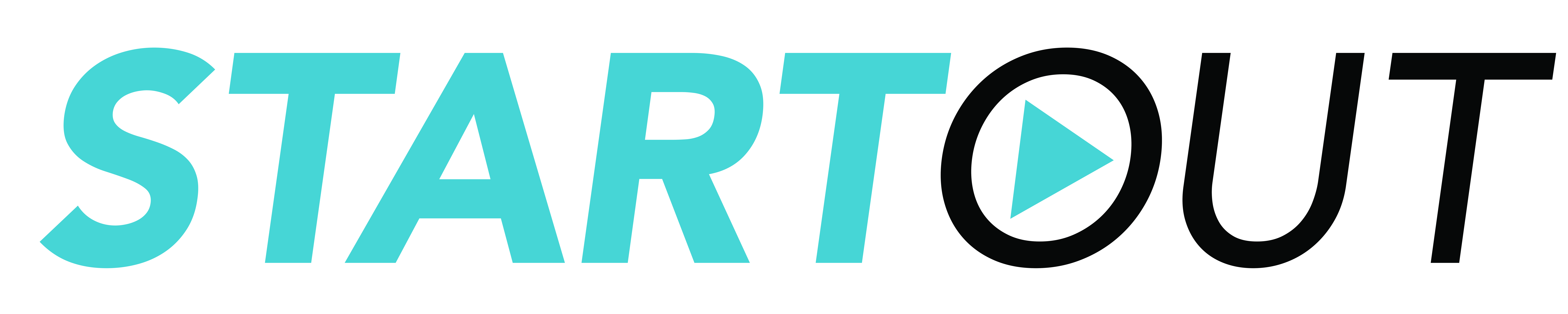
- StartOut logo
- Formation: 2009
- Type: 501(c)(3)
- Headquarters: San Francisco, CA
- Executive Director: Brian Richardson
- Website: www.StartOut.org

StartOut is a nonprofit organization supporting lesbian, gay, bisexual, transgender, and queer (LGBTQ) entrepreneurs.

The organization was founded in 2009 by entrepreneur Darren Spedale and has over 18,000 members attending its events in eight chapter cities: San Francisco, Los Angeles, New York City, Austin, Chicago, Washington, D.C., Atlanta and Denver.

== See also ==
- LGBT culture in San Francisco
- LGBT-owned business
- List of LGBT-related organizations and conferences
- List of LGBT rights organizations in the United States

== External sources ==
- Official web site
- New Group Addresses Out-Gay Entrepreneurs, EDGE Boston
