= Darren Spedale =

American businessman

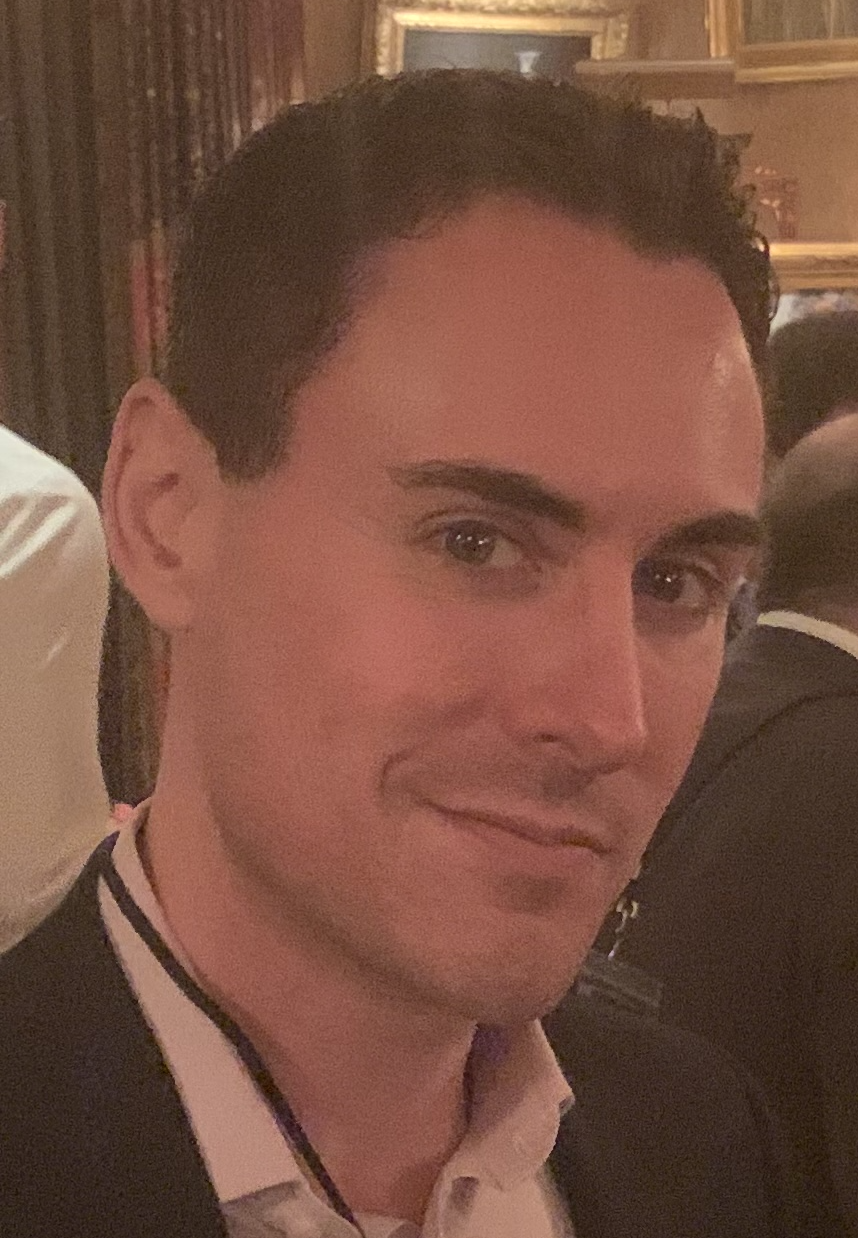
- Education: Duke University (BA); Stanford Law School (JD); Stanford GSB (MBA)

Darren Spedale is an entrepreneur and author. He founded StartOut, an organization supporting LGBT entrepreneurs. He also founded Family by Design, a website supporting parenting partnerships.

He attended Duke University, where he published a senior thesis on the emerging field of domestic partnership benefits. Spedale later said he began working in that field because "at that time employers were struggling with the idea of whether they should extend health care benefits and other benefits to unmarried partners of their employees." In 1996, Spedale received a Fulbright Program Fellowship to conduct research in Scandinavia on their registered partnership laws.

He is co-author with William Eskridge of Gay Marriage: For Better or For Worse?, which was published by the Oxford University Press in 2006.

Noting the lack of LGBT-specific support structure for LGBT, entrepreneurs Spedale created the organization StartOut in 2009.

In 2012 Spedale combined his interests in nontraditional families and entrepreneurship in a new startup focused on "parenting partnerships", whose purpose is to help adults to find an ideal parenting partner with whom to have a child together.

In December 2013 and again in March 2019, Business Insider named Spedale one of the "Most Important Gay People in Tech".
