= Ryan (surname) =

Ryan (Irish: Ó Riain) is a surname and a given name. The name is of Irish origin.

== Origins and meaning ==
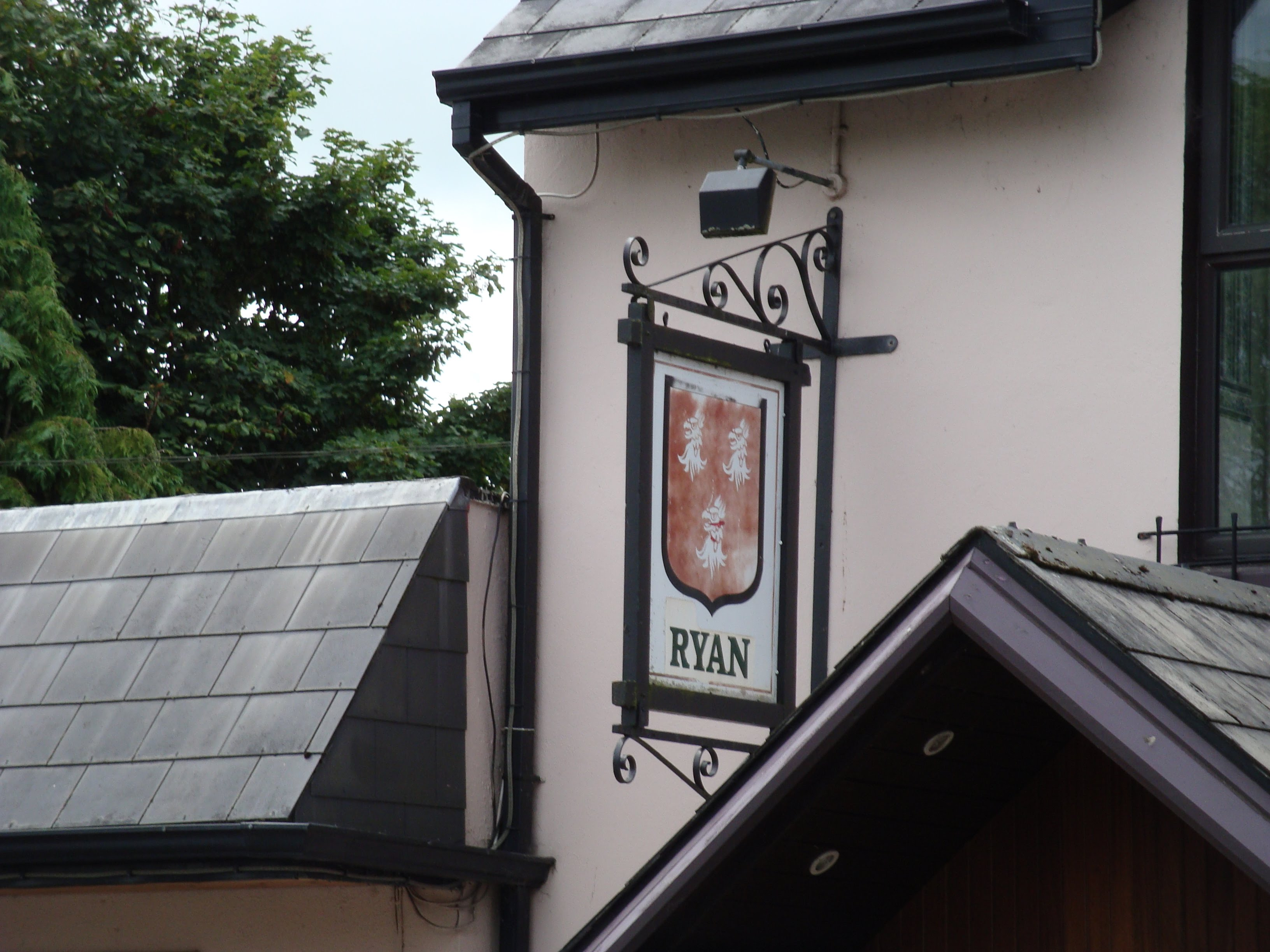
Ryan coat of arms at Valley Inn pub, Glenstal, Co. Limerick

There are several different origins for the surname. In some cases it may be a shortened form of O'Ryan, which is an Anglicized adaptation of the Gaelic surname Ó Riain, meaning "descendant of Rian". It can also be a shortened form of Mulryan or O'Mulryan, which are derived from the Gaelic Ó Maoilriain, meaning "descendant of the follower of Rian".

The meaning of the Old Irish name Rian is unknown. Some sources have suggested that it is related to the Old Irish word rían, meaning "water" or "ocean". Others have suggested that it is related to the Old Irish word rí, meaning "king". Both of these etymologies have been discounted by scholars, however. According to John Ryan, Professor of Early and Medieval History at University College Dublin, "What the Rian in the surnames Ó Riain and Ó Maolriain is has never been satisfactorily explained. Rian, like Niall, seems to be so ancient that its meaning was lost before records began."

Popular modern sources typically suggest that Ryan means "little king" or "illustrious".

There are also cases in which Ryan is an Americanized form of the German surname Rein.

== List of persons with the surname Ryan ==
=== A–D ===
- Abram Joseph Ryan (1838–1886), Catholic priest, poet
- Aileen B. Ryan (1912–1987), New York politician
- Allan A. Ryan, Jr. (1903–1981), New York financier and politician
- Allan Ryan (1945–2023), American attorney
- Ally Ryan, American singer
- Amy Ryan (born 1969), American actress
- Andrew Ryan (disambiguation), multiple people
- Anne Ryan (actress) (born 1969), American actress
- Anne Ryan (artist) (1889–1954), American artist
- Archie Ryan (cyclist) (born 2001), Irish professional racing cyclist
- B. J. Ryan (Robert Victor Ryan Jr., born 1975), baseball player
- Barry Ryan (disambiguation), multiple people
- Beatrice Judd Ryan (c. 1880–1966), Australian-American art dealer, curator
- Ben Ryan, rugby union coach
- Bernard Ryan (1900–1921), member of the IRA hanged in Dublin in 1921
- Bernard Ryan, Jr. (1923–2020), American author
- Bianca Ryan (born 1994), American singer and America's Got Talent winner
- Bill Ryan (disambiguation), multiple people
- Billy Ryan (1887–1951), American football player
- Blanchard Ryan (born 1967), American actress
- Bo Ryan (William Francis Ryan Jr, born 1947), American basketball coach
- Bob Ryan (disambiguation), multiple people
- Bobby Ryan (disambiguation), multiple people
- Brendan Ryan (disambiguation), multiple people
- Bruce Ryan (rugby league) (1921–2002), Australian rugby league footballer
- Buddy Ryan (1931–2016), American football coach
- C. J. Ryan (1943–2004), British priest and scholar of Italian studies
- C. W. Ryan (1869–1944), American politician
- Carly Ryan (1992–2007), Australian female murder victim
- Carsen Ryan (born 2003), American football player
- Cathy Cahlin Ryan, American actress
- Cheyney Ryan (born 1948), American philosopher
- Chris Ryan (disambiguation), multiple people
- Christopher Ryan (born 1950), British actor
- Claude Ryan (1925–2004), Canadian politician
- Cormac Ryan (born 1998), American basketball player
- Cornelius Ryan (1920–1974), Irish journalist and author
- Debby Ryan (born 1993), American actress
- Derek Ryan (disambiguation), multiple people
- Donald P. Ryan (born 1957), American archaeologist and writer
- Donald P. Ryan (Wisconsin politician) (1909–1995), Wisconsin state legislator
- Donnell Ryan, Federal Court of Australia judge

=== E–L ===
- Edward Ryan (disambiguation), multiple people
- Eileen Ryan (1927–2022), American actress
- Ethel Ryan (1886–1971), American politician
- Felix Ryan (1897–1963), Australian rugby league footballer
- Francis T. Ryan (1862–1927), American Medal of Honor recipient
- Frank Ryan (disambiguation), multiple people
- Fred Ryan (born 1955), CEO of Politico.com, former aide to Ronald Reagan
- Frederick Ryan (1876–1913), Irish playwright and socialist
- Gene Ryan (1867—c. 1938), British actor
- George Ryan (disambiguation), multiple people
- Gerry Ryan (1956–2010), Irish radio presenter
- Gig Ryan (born 1956), Australian poet
- Greg Ryan (born 1957), German-American soccer defender
- Harold M. Ryan (1911–2007), U.S. Representative from Michigan
- Ibolya Ryan, Hungarian-American murdered by an Arab in Abu Dhabi
- Ida Annah Ryan (1873–1950), American architect
- Ida Mary Barry Ryan (1854–1917), American philanthropist
- Irene Ryan (1902–1973), actress
- Jack Ryan (disambiguation), multiple people
- Jane Ryan (disambiguation), multiple people
- Jeff Ryan (disambiguation), multiple people
- Jenny Ryan (born 1982), English quizzer
- Jeri Ryan (born 1968), U.S. actress
- Jim Ryan (disambiguation), multiple people
- Jimmy Ryan (disambiguation), multiple people
- Joan Ryan (politician) (born 1955), UK politician
- Joe Ryan (baseball) (born 1996), American baseball player
- John Ryan (disambiguation), multiple people
- Jon Ryan (born 1981), Canadian gridiron football player
- Joseph Ryan (disambiguation), multiple people
- Josephine Ryan (1884–1977), Irish nationalist
- Julie Ryan (disambiguation), multiple people
- Kate Ryan (born 1980), Belgian singer and songwriter
- Katherine Ryan (born 1983), Canadian/Irish comedian, writer, presenter and actress
- Kathleen Ryan (1922–1985), Irish actress
- Kathryn Ryan, New Zealand radio journalist
- Kelleigh Ryan (born 1987), Canadian fencer
- Kevin Ryan (born 1949), New Zealand long-distance runner
- Kyle Ryan (born 1991), American baseball player
- Lacy Ryan, English actor
- Lance Ryan (born 1971), Canadian operatic tenor
- Lee Ryan (born 1983), English singer-songwriter and actor
- Leo Ryan (1925–1978), Congressman from San Francisco, killed at Jonestown
- Liam Ryan (disambiguation), multiple people
- Liza Ryan (born 1965), American visual artist
- Lloyd Ryan, British jazz drummer
- Lola Ryan (1925–2003), Australian artist
- Lucille Frances Ryan, better known as Lucy Lawless (born 1968), actress from New Zealand

=== M–R ===
- Marion Ryan (1931–1999), British singer
- Mark Ryan (disambiguation), multiple people
- Martin Ryan (disambiguation), multiple people
- Marty Ryan, American politician
- Matthew Ryan (disambiguation), multiple people
- Meg Ryan (born 1961), U.S. actress
- Michael Robert Ryan, a murderer from the UK
- Michael Ryan (disambiguation), multiple people
- Michelle K. Ryan (born 1973), Australian psychologist and academic
- Michelle Ryan (born 1984), British actress
- Michelle Ryan, Australian choreographer, artistic director of Restless Dance Company
- Miles Ryan (1826–1887), Irish recipient of the Victoria Cross
- Mitchell Ryan (1934–2022), American actor
- Murray Ryan (American politician) (1922–2017), American politician
- Myles and Connor Ryan (born 1995), British singers
- Natalie Ryan, American disc golfer
- Nicky Ryan (1946–2025), Irish music producer, recording engineer, and manager
- Nolan Ryan (born 1947), baseball player
- Patricia Ryan (disambiguation), multiple people
- Patrick Ryan (disambiguation), multiple people
- Patti Ryan, U.S. singer and songwriter
- Patty Ryan (1961–2023), German singer
- Patty Ryan (painter), U.S. painter
- Paul Ryan (disambiguation), multiple people
- Peggy Ryan (1924–2004), American dancer
- Perry T. Ryan (born 1962), American author
- Peter Ryan (disambiguation), multiple people
- Phil Ryan (disambiguation), multiple people
- Phyllis Ryan (1895–1983), Irish chemist and nationalist
- Phyllis Ryan (actress) (1920–2011), Irish actress
- Pohai Ryan, American politician
- Prestin Ryan (born 1980), Canadian ice hockey player
- Ray Ryan (baseball) (died 1958), minor league baseball player, manager, team owner and league president
- Ray Ryan (businessman) (1904–1977), American gambler, oilman, promoter, and developer
- Ray Ryan (hurler) (1981–2025), Irish hurler
- Rex Ryan (born 1962), American football coach; twin brother of Rob
- Richard Ryan (disambiguation), multiple people
- Richie Ryan (disambiguation), multiple people
- River Ryan (born 1998), American baseball player
- Rob Ryan (born 1962), American football coach; twin brother of Rex
- Robbi Ryan (born 1997), American basketball player
- Robert Ryan (disambiguation), multiple people
- Ronald Ryan (1925–1967), (Last person to be legally executed in Australia.)
- Ross Ryan (born 1950), Australian singer-songwriter
- Roz Ryan (born 1951), American actress
- Ryder Ryan (born 1995), American baseball player

=== S–Z ===
- Scott Ryan (disambiguation), multiple people
- Séamus Ryan (1895–1933), Irish senator
- Sean Ryan (disambiguation), multiple people
- Shannon Ryan (born 1996), English professional boxer
- Shawn Ryan (born 1966), American screenwriter and producer
- Sheila Ryan, (1921–1975), American actress
- Sod Ryan (1905–1964), American football player
- T. Claude Ryan (1898–1982), American aviator and aeronautic engineer
- T. J. Ryan (hurler) (born 1974), Irish hurler
- T. J. Ryan (Thomas Joseph Ryan, 1876–1921), Australian politician, premier of Queensland
- Thomas Ryan (disambiguation), multiple people
- Tim Ryan (disambiguation), multiple people
- Tina Rivers Ryan, American curator, art historian
- Tomás Ryan (born 1944), Irish hurler
- Tommy Ryan (disambiguation), multiple people
- Tony Ryan (1936–2007), Irish businessman
- Tony Ryan (scientist) (born 1962), British polymer chemist
- Una Ryan (born 1941), Malaysian born biologist
- Walter D'Arcy Ryan (1870–1934), lighting engineer
- Warren Ryan (born 1941), Australian rugby league football coach
- Will Ryan (1949–2021), American voice actor, singer, and comedian
- Willard Ryan (1890–1962), American football coach
- William Ryan (disambiguation), multiple people
- Yasmine Ryan (c. 1983–2017) New Zealand journalist

== Fictional characters ==
- Allison Ryan, a character played by Nicole Eggert in the 2008 movie Loaded
- Andrew Ryan, the founder of Rapture and a major character in the 2007 video game BioShock
- April Ryan, appearing in the computer adventure games The Longest Journey and Dreamfall
- Aran Ryan, an opponent in Super NES video game Super Punch-Out!!
- Archie Ryan, the pseudonym of Lincoln Burrows, a fictional character from the television show Prison Break
- Barbara Ryan, character in the soap opera As the World Turns
- Beth Ryan, a character in the 1987 movie Throw Momma from the Train
- Bill, Emily, Lulu, and Sandy Ryan, characters from American television sitcom United We Fall
- Burke Ryan, a character in the 2009 American romantic drama movie Love Happens
- Caitlin Ryan, a character in the Degrassi franchise
- Frank Ryan, a character in the 1934 film The Man Who Changed His Name
- Jack Ryan, a separate character and the primary protagonist of the 2007 video game BioShock
- Jack Ryan, in Tom Clancy books and film adaptations
- Jake Ryan, character in Sixteen Candles/Hannah Montana, TV character portrayed by Cody Linley
- James Francis Ryan, character in the 1998 American war film Saving Private Ryan
- John Ryan, a character in the 1995 Canadian-American martial arts movie Law of the Jungle
- Kevin Ryan, secondary character of the TV thriller show Castle
- Mary Ryan, also known aka Blue Mary, a character in the Fatal Fury series and The King of Fighters
- Mr. Ryan, a character in the 1989 American science fiction comedy movie Bill & Ted's Excellent Adventure
- Nory Ryan, main character in book Nory Ryan's Song by Patricia Reilly Giff
- Paul Ryan, a character on American daytime serial As the World Turns
- Professor Sam Ryan, character in the television series Silent Witness
- Rachel, Robbie, and Tom Ryan, characters in the 2006 American parody Scary Movie 4
- Richie Ryan, fictional character in Highlander: The Series
- Robert Charles "Rusty" Ryan in Ocean's 11, 12, and 13
- Tommy Ryan, a character in the 1997 film Titanic

== See also ==
- Rayan (Persian given name)
- Rhyan, given name and surname

== Bibliography ==
- Laffan, Thomas (1911). Tipperary Families : Being The Hearth Money Records for 1665–1667. James Duffy & Co.
