= Ryan =

Ryan may refer to:

== People and fictional characters ==
- Ryan (given name), a given name (including a list of people with the name)
- Ryan (surname), a surname (including a list of people with the name)

== Places ==
=== Australia ===
- Division of Ryan, an electoral district in the Australian House of Representatives, in Queensland
- Ryan, New South Wales
- Ryan, Queensland, a suburb of the City of Mount Isa

=== United States ===
- Ryan, California
- Ryan, former name of Lila C, California
- Ryan, Iowa
- Ryan, Minnesota
- Ryan, Illinois
- Ryan, Oklahoma
- Ryan, Washington
- Ryan, West Virginia
- Ryan Park, Wyoming
- Ryan Township, Pennsylvania

== Film, radio, television and web ==
- Ryan (film), an animated documentary
- Ryan (TV series), 1970s Australian TV series
- Von Ryan's Express, a 1965 World War II adventure film

== Other uses ==
- Loch Ryan, a sea loch in Scotland
- Ryan M-1, an airplane
- Ryan Aeronautical Company (Claude Ryan)
- Ryanair (Tony Ryan)
- Ryan Field (disambiguation)
- Ryan International Airlines (Ron Ryan)
- Ryan International School
- Ryan LLC, a Dallas-based tax services and consulting firm
- Ryan-Pitman Theory (Black Sea deluge theory)
- Operation RYAN, a Soviet military intelligence operation which acronym stands for Raketno-YAdernoe Napadenie ("Nuclear Missile Attack")
- Ryan, Kakao Friends characters

== See also ==
- Justice Ryan (disambiguation)
- Panama Refining Co. v. Ryan
