= James Ryan =

James Ryan may refer to:

== Government ==
- James Tobias Ryan (1818–1899), New South Wales politician
- James Ryan (Canadian politician) (1821–1892), politician in New Brunswick, Canada
- James Ryan (Wisconsin politician) (1830–1913), Wisconsin politician
- James D. Ryan (1844–1925), Irish-born merchant and politician in Newfoundland
- James Wilfrid Ryan (1858–1907), US Representative from Pennsylvania
- James Ryan (Australian politician) (1863–1940), New South Wales politician
- James Ryan (Irish politician) (1891–1970), Irish politician
- James L. Ryan (born 1932), American judge on the Michigan Supreme Court and 6th Circuit Court of Appeals

== Religion ==
- James Ryan (bishop) (1848–1923), American bishop
- James Hugh Ryan (1886–1948), American archbishop

== Sports ==
- James Ryan (rugby union, born 1887) (1887–1957), New Zealand rugby union footballer
- James Ryan (rugby union, born 1917) (1917–1978, Irish international rugby union player
- James Ryan (rugby union, born 1983), New Zealand rugby union footballer
- James Ryan (rugby union, born 1996), Ireland rugby union footballer
- James Ryan (hurler) (born 1987), Irish hurler
- James Ryan (cricketer) (1892–1915), English cricketer
- James E. Ryan (horse trainer) (1900–1976), American horse trainer

== Entertainment ==
- James Ryan (actor) (born 1952), South African actor
- James Leo Ryan (actor), American actor
- James Francis Ryan, character played by Matt Damon in the film Saving Private Ryan

== Other ==
- James M. Ryan (1842–1917), businessman from Newfoundland
- James Ryan (entrepreneur) (born 1974), American entrepreneur in cyber security
- James Edward Ryan (born 1966), American educator, author, lawyer, and legal scholar; former president of University of Virginia
- James J. Ryan (1851–1939), Irish Catholic priest and president of St. Patrick's College, Thurles
- James Ryan (born 1961), Canadian union leader of Ontario English Catholic Teachers' Association

== See also ==
- Jim Ryan (disambiguation)
- Jimmy Ryan (disambiguation)
- Jim Ryun (born 1947), American former track athlete and politician
