= John Ryan =

John or Johnny Ryan may refer to:

== Business ==
- John Ryan (businessman) (born 1950), pioneer of cosmetic surgery and chairman of Doncaster Rovers
- John D. Ryan (industrialist) (1864–1933), American copper mining magnate
- John Ryan (printer) (1761–1847), "father of the press in British North America"
- John J. "Bald Jack" Ryan, American businessman

== Media, arts and entertainment ==
- John Ryan (cartoonist) (1921–2009), British animator and cartoonist
- John Joseph Patrick Ryan, real name of American actor Jack Lord
- John P. Ryan (1936–2007), American film actor
- John Saint Ryan (1953–2025), British actor and equestrian
- Johnny Ryan (born 1970), American alternative comics creator and cartoonist
- John Ryan (musician) (born 1987), American singer-songwriter and record producer
- John Ryan (producer) (1928–2010), Canadian movie and TV producer; see On the 2nd Day of Christmas

== Military ==
- John Ryan (VC 1857) (1823–1858), Irish recipient of the Victoria Cross
- John Ryan (VC 1863) (1839–1863), Irish recipient of the Victoria Cross
- John Ryan (Australian soldier) (1890–1941), Australian recipient of the Victoria Cross
- John Dale Ryan (1915–1983), general in the United States Air Force
- John R. Ryan (born 1945), chancellor of SUNY, former superintendent, the United States Naval Academy

== Politics ==
- John Ryan (British politician) (1940–2002), British Labour Member of Parliament
- John Ryan (Irish politician) (1927–2014), Irish Labour Party politician
- John Ryan (New South Wales politician) (born 1956), Legislative Council Member
- John Ryan (South Australian politician) (1911–1988), House of Assembly member and Speaker
- John Ryan (Australian politician) (1890–1974), Australian Senator
- John Ryan (New Mexico politician), American state legislator in New Mexico
- John F. Ryan (1848–1936), Virginia politician
- John Henry Ryan, Washington legislator and businessman
- John Nagel Ryan (1816–1887), New South Wales politician
- John P. Ryan (New York politician), American businessman and politician from New York

== Sports ==
=== Association football (soccer) ===
- John Ryan (footballer, born 1930) (1930–2008), Scottish football player
- John Ryan (footballer, born 1947) (born 1947), English football player and manager
- John Ryan (footballer, born 1962), English football player
- John Ryan (footballer, born 1968), Irish football player
- John Ryan (footballer, born 2004), Irish football player

=== Baseball ===
- Johnny Ryan (baseball) (1853–1902), American baseball player
- John Ryan (pitcher) (fl. 1880s), American baseball player
- Blondy Ryan (John Collins Ryan, 1906–1959), American baseball shortstop

=== Hurling ===
- John Ryan (Dublin hurler), Dublin hurler of the 1910s
- Johnny Ryan (hurler, born 1914) (1914–1997), Tipperary hurler of the 1930s-40s
- John Ryan (Galway hurler) (1958–2003), Irish hurler
- Johnny Ryan (hurler, born 1988), Tipperary hurler of the 2010s

=== Rugby ===
- John Ryan (rugby union coach) (1939–2022), Welsh rugby union coach
- John Ryan (rugby, born 1948) (1948–1982), Australian rugby union and rugby league player
- John Ryan (rugby union, born 1988), Irish rugby union player

=== Other sports ===
- John Ryan (jockey); Jockey who competed in the 1859 Grand National
- John J. Ryan (1886–1950), American college football coach at Marquette University and the University of Wisconsin
- John Ryan (runner) (1893–1963), Irish Olympic distance runner
- John Ryan (Australian rules footballer) (1909–1989), Australian rules footballer for Essendon and Fitzroy
- John Ryan (judoka) (1934–1989), Irish judoka
- Johnny Ryan (Australian footballer) (born 1938), Australian rules footballer for Richmond
- John Ryan (swimmer) (born 1944), Australian Olympic swimmer
- Jon Ryan (born 1981), Canadian football punter

== Writers ==
- John Ryan (artist) (1925–1993), Irish artist, broadcaster, publisher, critic, editor, patron and publican
- John Ryan (publisher) (born 1967), Irish journalist and publisher

== Other ==
- John Ryan (bishop) (1784–1864), Irish Roman Catholic bishop
- John A. Ryan (1869–1945), American Roman Catholic social reformer, economist and writer
- Jack Ryan (FBI agent) (John C. Ryan, born 1938), former FBI agent
- John Ryan (diplomat) (1923–1987), Australian diplomat and director-general of ASIS
- John M. Ryan (born 1949), American prosecutor
- John W. Ryan (1929–2011), president of Indiana University
- John Alphonsus Ryan (born 1952), Irish Catholic bishop and academic

== See also ==
- Jack Ryan (disambiguation)
