= Frank Ryan =

Frank Ryan may refer to:

- Frank Ryan (cricketer) (1888–1954), English cricketer
- Frank Ryan (sportscaster) (1899–1961), publicity director and sports announcer
- Frank Ryan (tenor) (1900–1965), Irish opera singer
- Frank Ryan (Irish republican) (1902–1944), member of the Irish Republican Army and the Republican Congress
- Frank Ryan (filmmaker), American screenwriter and director
- Frank Ryan (Australian footballer) (1932–2011), Australian rules footballer for Richmond
- Frank Ryan (mayor) (1932–2017), New Zealand politician, mayor of Mount Albert
- Frank Ryan (American football) (1936–2024), American football quarterback and mathematician
- Frank Ryan (gangster) (1942–1984), Canadian mobster
- Frank P. Ryan (born 1944), British evolutionary biologist
- Frank Ryan (politician) (born 1951), member of the Pennsylvania House of Representatives
- Frank Ryan (surgeon) (1960–2010), American plastic surgeon
- Frank Bradshaw Ryan (born 1995), Irish rugby union player
- Frank Ryan (shot putter), winner of the shot put at the 1939 USA Indoor Track and Field Championships

== See also ==
- Francis Ryan (1908–1977), American soccer player
- Francis J. Ryan (1916–1963), American zoologist.
- Francis T. Ryan (1862–1927), American Medal of Honor recipient
