= Jack Ryan =

Jack Ryan may refer to:

== People ==
=== Sports ===
==== Australian rules football ====
- Jack Ryan (footballer, born 1873) (1873–1931), Australian rules footballer for St Kilda
- Jack Ryan (footballer, born 1907) (1907–1959), Australian rules footballer for Hawthorn
- Jack Ryan (footballer, born 1914) (1914–1976), Australian rules footballer for Footscray and North Melbourne

==== Baseball ====
- Jack Ryan (catcher) (1868–1952), MLB catcher and University of Virginia baseball coach
- Jack Ryan (outfielder) (1905–1967), MLB outfielder
- Jack Ryan (pitcher) (1884–1949), Major League Baseball pitcher

==== Other sports ====
- Jack Ryan (English footballer) (born 1996), English footballer
- Jack Ryan (streetball player), American streetball player
- Jack Ryan (Moneygall hurler) (born 1946), Irish hurler and Gaelic footballer for Tipperary
- Jack Ryan (Roscrea hurler) (born 1927), Irish hurler for Tipperary
- Jack Ryan (runner), Australian masters long-distance runner
- Jack Ryan (rugby union), Irish international rugby union player

=== Government and military ===
- Jack Ryan (FBI agent) (born 1938), former FBI agent
- Jack Ryan (politician) (born 1959), former candidate for United States senator from Illinois and ex-husband of actress Jeri Ryan
- John M. Ryan (born 1949), American attorney
- Jack Ryan (USAID), USAID officer killed in Vietnam while working for the Department of Public Safety, alleged CIA officer

=== Other people ===
- Jack Ryan (designer) (1926–1991), designer and Zsa Zsa Gabor's sixth husband

== Arts, entertainment, and media ==
- Jack Ryan (character), a character in a series of novels by Tom Clancy
  - Jack Ryan (franchise), film series based on Tom Clancy's character
  - Jack Ryan (TV series), an Amazon Video television series based on Tom Clancy's character
  - Jack Ryan: Shadow Recruit, a 2014 film based on Tom Clancy's character
  - Jack Ryan: Ghost War, a 2026 film based on Tom Clancy's character
- Jack Ryan, a character in the Bioshock video game series
- Jack Ryan, the titular character in a series of novels by Elmore Leonard; see Unknown Man No. 89
- Jack Ryan, a renegade DEA officer in a series of direct to video movies; see Cyborg Cop

== See also ==
- John Ryan (disambiguation)
