= Ryan Thomas (disambiguation) =

Ryan Thomas (born 1984) is an English actor.

Ryan Thomas may also refer to:

- Ryan Thomas (fighter) (born 1984), mixed martial arts fighter
- Ryan Thomas (footballer) (born 1994), New Zealand football player
- Ryan C. Thomas (born 1975), American author and editor
- Ryan Thomas, TV character in Life Unexpected

== See also ==
- Thomas Ryan (disambiguation)
