= Paul Ryan (disambiguation) =

Paul Ryan (born 1970) is an American politician, elected Speaker of the House in 2015.

Paul Ryan may also refer to:

== Sportspeople ==
- Paul Ryan (biathlete) (born 1970), British Olympic biathlete
- Paul Ryan (boxer) (born 1965), English boxer of the 1990s
- Paul Ryan (hurler) (born 1988), Irish hurler
- Paul Ryan (Australian footballer) (born 1962), Australian rules footballer

== Musicians ==
- Paul Ryan (singer, born 1948) (1948–1992), English songwriter and record producer, part of singing duo "Paul & Barry Ryan"
- Paul Ryan (singer, born 1952) (1952–2022), British film reviewer, historian and jazz singer
- Paul Ryan (musician and agent) (born 1970), English musician, guitarist for Cradle of Filth and The Blood Divine

== Other people ==
- Paul William Ryan (1906–1947), American author
- Paul Ryan (video artist) (1943–2013), American video artist and communications theorist
- Paul Ryan (actor) (1945–2015), American actor and television personality
- Paul Ryan (cartoonist) (1949–2016), American comics artist
- Paul F. Ryan (born 1969), American film producer, director, and teacher
- Paul Ryan, British artist researching sketchbooks

== Fictional characters ==
- Paul Ryan (As the World Turns), character on American daytime serial
- Paulie "Wheels of Fury" Ryan, character in American video game Tony Hawk's Underground 2

== See also ==
- Ryan (surname)
