= Robert Ryan (disambiguation) =

Robert Ryan (1909–1973) was an American actor.

Robert Ryan may also refer to:

- Robert Ryan (Canadian politician) (1878–1954), Liberal member of the Canadian House of Commons
- Robert Ryan (Irish politician) (1882–1952), Irish Fianna Fáil politician
- Robert Ryan (writer) (born c. 1963), English author, journalist and screenwriter
- Robert J. Ryan Sr. (1914–2003), American diplomat
- Robert S. Ryan, American engineer at NASA
- Rob Ryan (born 1962), American football coach
- Rob Ryan (artist) (born 1962), British visual artist
- Rob Ryan (baseball) (born 1973), American baseball outfielder
- Rob Ryan (entrepreneur) (born 1948), founder of Ascend Communications and Entrepreneur America
- B. J. Ryan (Robert Victor Ryan Jr., born 1975), American baseball coach and pitcher
- R. L. Ryan (Robert Lawrence Ryan, 1946–1991), American actor

== See also ==
- Bob Ryan (disambiguation)
- Bobby Ryan (disambiguation)
- Robbie Ryan (disambiguation)
