= Thomas Ryan =

Thomas, Tom or Tommy Ryan may refer to:

== People in politics and military ==
- Thomas Ryan (Commandant) (c. 1790–??), soldier and penal administrator
- Thomas Ryan (Quebec politician) (1804–1889), businessman and Senator from Quebec
- Thomas Ryan (Kansas politician) (1837–1914), Congressional representative from Kansas
- Thomas Ryan (Canadian politician) (1849–1937), Canadian politician
- Tommy Ryan (politician) (1852–?), Australian politician, member of the Queensland Legislative Assembly
- Thomas Ryan (1870–1943), Australian politician, member of both the Victorian Legislative Assembly and South Australian House of Assembly
- T. J. Ryan (1876–1921), Australian politician, Premier of Queensland, Australia (1915–1919), also New South Wales Parliament member (1921)
- Thomas Jefferson Ryan (1888–1968), Congressional representative from New York
- Thomas Ryan (Irish Army officer) (1893–1980), I.R.A. Commander and Lt. Col. Irish Defence Forces
- Thomas Ryan (New South Wales politician) (1895–1972), Australian politician, member for Auburn in the New South Wales Legislative Assembly
- Thomas J. Ryan (admiral) (1901–1970), American admiral and Medal of Honor recipient
- Thomas P. Ryan Jr. (1928–2003), mayor of Rochester, New York
- Thomas M. Ryan Jr. (born 1928), United States Air Force general

== People in business ==
- Tom Ryan (business executive), (Thomas V. Ryan), CEO and president of Paramount Streaming and Founder of Pluto TV
- Thomas Ryan (businessman), executive at CVS Corporation
- Thomas Fortune Ryan (1851–1928), U.S. businessman
- Tony Ryan (Thomas Anthony Ryan, 1936–2007), Irish founder of Ryanair
- Thomas Ryan (businessman), executive at the National Basketball Association (NBA)

== People in sport ==
=== Hurling ===
- Tommy Ryan (Boherlahan–Dualla hurler) (fl. 1890s), Irish hurler for Tipperary and Boherlahen-Dualla
- Tommy Ryan (Thurles Sarsfields hurler) (fl. 1940s–1950s), Irish hurler for Tipperary and Thurles Sarsfields
- Tom Ryan (Toomevara hurler) (1941–1970), Irish hurler for Tipperary and Toomevara
- Tom Ryan (Killenaule hurler) (1941–2023), Irish hurler for Tipperary and Killenaule
- Tom Ryan (Limerick hurler) (born 1944), Irish hurler for Limerick and Ballybrown, later a manager
- T. J. Ryan (hurler) (born 1974), Irish hurler for Limerick and Garryspillane
- Thomas Ryan (Waterford hurler) (born 1989), Irish hurler for Waterford and Tallow

=== Other sports ===
- Thomas Ryan (rugby union) (1864–1927), New Zealand rugby player who played for the All Blacks in 1884
- Thomas Ryan (cricketer) (1865–1921), Australian cricketer
- Tommy Ryan (1870–1948), American bareknuckle boxer
- Tommy Ryan (Australian footballer) (1873–1948), Australian rules footballer for Melbourne and St Kilda
- Thomas Ryan (American football) (fl. 1920s), American college football and basketball player
- Tom Ryan (Australian footballer) (1924–2017), Australian rules footballer for South Melbourne
- Tommy Ryan (rugby league) (1930–2023), Australian rugby league footballer
- Tommy Ryan (Gaelic footballer) (born 1967), Irish Gaelic footballer
- Ogre 2 (Tom Ryan, born 1986), American professional Halo player
- Thomas Ryan (soccer) (born 1987), American soccer player
- Tom Ryan (lacrosse) (fl. 1990s), American professional lacrosse coach and player

== People in arts and entertainment ==
- Thomas Ryan (musician) (1827–1903), Irish-American musician
- Thomas Ryan, American actor in The Relic
- Thomas Jay Ryan (born 1962), American actor
- Tom K. Ryan, creator of the comic strip Tumbleweeds
- Tom Ryan, Detroit DJ who played character Count Scary
- Thomas Ryan (artist) (1929–2021), Irish artist

== Other people ==
- Thomas Francis Ryan (1872–1961), inventor of five-pin bowling
- Thomas Jervis Ryan (1834–1901), New Zealand policeman
- Thomas Ryan (bishop) (1915–1983), bishop of Clonfert, Ireland, 1962–82
- Tommy Ryan, alias of Genovese crime family boss Thomas Eboli

== Fictional characters ==
- Tom Ryan, a Primeval character
- Tom Ryan, a character in The Unit

== See also ==
- Ryan Thomas (disambiguation)
