= Jim Ryan =

Jim Ryan may refer to:

== Sports ==
- Jim Ryan (linebacker) (born 1957), American football player
- Jim Ryan (American football coach) (born 1975), American football coach
- Jim Ryan (Australian footballer) (1918–2006), Australian rules footballer
- Jim Ryan (footballer, born 1942), Welsh football (soccer) player
- Jim Ryan (footballer, born 1945), Scottish football (soccer) player

== Others ==
- Jim Ryan (politician) (1946–2022), American politician from Illinois
- Jim Ryan (reporter) (born 1939), reporter and television anchorman from New York
- Jim Ryan (writer) (1936–2022), American screenwriter
- Jim Ryan, former president of Sony Interactive Entertainment

== See also ==
- Jim Ryun (born 1947), American former track athlete and politician
- James Ryan (disambiguation)
- Jimmy Ryan (disambiguation)
- Ryan (surname)
