= Tim Ryan =

Tim, Timmy, or Timothy Ryan may refer to:

== Political figures ==
- Tim Ryan (Florida politician) (born 1956), American Democratic Party legislator and county commissioner
- Tim Ryan (Ohio politician) (born 1973), American Democratic Party legislator and 2020 presidential candidate
- Tim Ryan, alternative pseudonym of American Communist Party leader Eugene Dennis (1905–1961)
- Timothy Edward Ryan (1859–1911), American politician in Wisconsin, U.S. Senate candidate in 1899

== Sportspeople ==
- Timmy Ryan (1910–1995), Irish hurler for Limerick
- Tim Ryan (hurler) (1923–1996), Irish hurler for Tipperary
- Tim Ryan (sportscaster) (born 1939), Canadian-born American sportscaster
- Tim Ryan (American football, born 1967) (born 1967), American defensive tackle and broadcaster
- Tim Ryan (American football, born 1968) (born 1968), American offensive lineman
- Tim Ryan (footballer) (born 1974), English footballer
- Tim Ryan (rugby union, born 1984), Irish rugby player
- Tim Ryan (rugby union, born 2003), Australian rugby union player

== Others ==
- Timothy Ryan (biochemist), American neuroscientist and biophysicist
- Timothy Ryan (newspaper publisher), American media executive (The Baltimore Sun)
- Tim Ryan (1949–2016), Canadian musician, co-founder of band Jackson Hawke
- Tim Ryan (actor) (1889–1956), American performer and scenarist
- Tim Ryan (businessman), chairman of PwC
- Tim Ryan (country musician) (born 1964), American country music singer-songwriter
- Tim Ryan (engineer), American synthesizer engineer since 1970s, founder of M-Audio
- L. Timothy Ryan (born 1958), American chef and president of the Culinary Institute of America
- Tim Ryan (recovery advocate) (born 1968), American activist, drug abuse interventionist, author, and speaker

== Fictional characters ==
- Tim Ryan (Blue Heelers), portrayed by Grant Piro in 1998–99 on Australian TV series Blue Heelers
