= Electoral history of Hubert Humphrey =

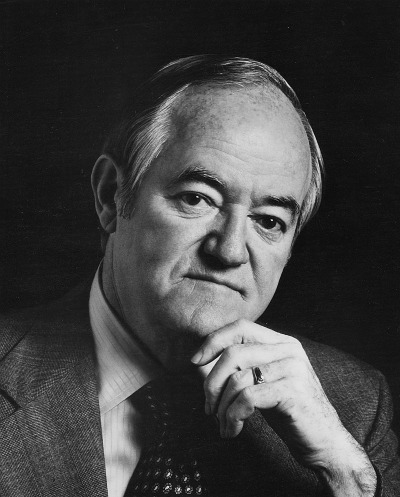
Portrait of Hubert Humphrey

Hubert Humphrey served as the 38th vice president of the United States (1965–1969), as a United States senator from Minnesota (1949–1964 and 1971–1978), and as the 35th mayor of Minneapolis, Minnesota (1945–1948).

1948 United States Senate election in Minnesota:

- Hubert Humphrey (DFL) – 729,494 (59.78%)
- Joseph H. Ball (R) (inc.) – 485,801 (39.81%)
- Vincent Raymond Dunne (Socialist Workers) – 4,951 (0.41%)

1952 Democratic presidential primaries:

- Estes Kefauver – 3,169,448 (65.04%)
- Pat Brown – 485,578 (9.97%)
- Richard B. Russell Jr. – 371,179 (7.62%)
- Matthew M. Neely – 191,471 (3.93%)
- Robert J. Bulkley – 184,880 (3.79%)
- Hubert Humphrey – 102,527 (2.10%)
- Adlai Stevenson II – 81,096 (1.66%)
- Dwight D. Eisenhower – 64,911 (1.33%)
- Harry S. Truman (inc.) – 62,345 (1.28%)

1952 Democratic National Convention (1st Presidential tally):

- Estes Kefauver – 340
- Adlai Stevenson II – 273
- Richard B. Russell Jr. – 268
- W. Averell Harriman – 123.5
- Robert S. Kerr – 65
- Alben W. Barkely – 48.5
- Paul A. Dever – 37.5
- Scattering – 26.5
- Hubert Humphrey – 26
- J. William Fulbright – 22

Minnesota United States Senate election, 1954:

- Hubert Humphrey (DFL) (inc.) – 642,193 (56.39%)
- Val Bjornson (R) – 479,619 (42.11%)
- Frank P. Ryan (I) – 12,457 (1.09%)
- Vincent Raymond Dunne (Socialist Workers) – 4,683 (0.41%)

1956 Democratic National Convention (Vice Presidential tally): First ballot:

- Estes Kefauver – 466.5
- John F. Kennedy – 294.5
- Albert Gore Sr. – 178
- Robert F. Wagner Jr. – 162.5
- Hubert Humphrey – 134
- Luther Hodges – 40
- P. T. Maner – 33
- LeRoy Collins – 29
- Clinton Anderson – 16
- Frank G. Clement – 14
- Pat Brown – 1
- Lyndon B. Johnson – 1
- Stuart Symington – 1

Second ballot:

- John F. Kennedy – 618
- Estes Kefauver – 551.5
- Albert Gore Sr. – 110.5
- Hubert Humphrey – 74.5
- Robert F. Wagner Jr. – 9.5
- Luther Hodges – 0.5

Third ballot:

- Estes Kefauver – 755.5
- John F. Kennedy – 589
- Albert Gore Sr. – 13.5
- Robert F. Wagner Jr. – 6
- Hubert Humphrey – 2

1960 Democratic presidential primaries:

- John F. Kennedy – 1,847,259 (31.43%)
- Pat Brown – 1,354,031 (23.04%)
- George H. McLain – 646,387 (11.00%)
- Hubert Humphrey – 590,410 (10.05%)
- George Smathers – 322,235 (5.48%)
- Michael DiSalle – 315,312 (5.37%)
- Unpledged delegates – 241,958 (4.12%)
- Albert S. Potter – 208,057 (3.54%)
- Wayne Morse – 147,262 (2.51%)
- Adlai Stevenson II – 51,833 (0.88%)

1960 Democratic National Convention (Presidential tally):

- John F. Kennedy – 806 (52.89%)
- Lyndon B. Johnson – 409 (26.84%)
- Stuart Symington – 86 (5.64%)
- Adlai Stevenson II – 80 (5.25%)
- Robert Meyner – 43 (2.82%)
- Hubert Humphrey – 42 (2.76%)
- George Smathers – 30 (1.97%)
- Ross Barnett – 23 (1.51%)
- Herschel C. Loveless – 2 (0.13%)
- Pat Brown – 1 (0.07%)
- Orval E. Faubus – 1 (0.07%)
- Albert Rosellini – 1 (0.07%)

Minnesota United States Senate election, 1960:

- Hubert Humphrey (DFL) (inc.) – 884,168 (57.53%)
- P. Kenneth Peterson (R) – 648,586 (42.20%)
- Carl Feingold (Socialist Workers) – 4,085 (0.27%)

1964 Democratic presidential primaries:

- Pat Brown – 1,693,813 (27.26%)
- Lyndon B. Johnson (inc.) – 1,106,999 (17.82%)
- Sam Yorty – 798,431 (12.85%)
- George Wallace – 798,431 (12.85%)
- John W. Reynolds – 522,405 (8.41%)
- Albert S. Porter – 493,619 (7.94%)
- Matthew E. Welsh – 376,023 (6.05%)
- Daniel Brewster – 267,106 (4.30%)
- Jennings Randolph – 131,432 (2.12%)
- Unpledged – 81,614 (1.31%)
- Robert F. Kennedy – 36,258 (0.58%)
- Lar Daly – 15,160 (0.24%)
- Henry Cabot Lodge Jr. – 8,495 (0.14%)
- Albert J. Easter – 8,275 (0.13%)
- Adlai Stevenson II – 800 (0.01%)
- Hubert Humphrey – 548 (0.01%)

1964 Democratic National Convention (Vice Presidential tally):

- Hubert Humphrey – 2,316 (100.00%)

1964 United States presidential election:

- Lyndon B. Johnson/Hubert Humphrey (D) – 43,127,041 (61.1%) and 486 electoral votes (44 states and D.C. carried)
- Barry Goldwater/William E. Miller (R) – 27,175,754 (38.5%) and 52 electoral votes (6 states carried)

1968 Democratic presidential primaries:

- Eugene McCarthy – 2,914,933 (38.73%)
- Robert F. Kennedy – 2,305,148 (30.63%)
- Stephen M. Young – 549,140 (7.30%)
- Lyndon B. Johnson (inc.) – 383,590 (5.10%)
- Thomas C. Lynch – 380,286 (5.05%)
- Roger D. Branigin – 238,700 (3.17%)
- George Smathers – 236,242 (3.14%)
- Hubert Humphrey – 166,463 (2.21%)
- Unpledged – 161,143 (2.14%)
- Scott Kelly – 128,899 (1.71%)
- George Wallace – 34,489 (0.46%)
- Richard Nixon (write-in) – 13,610 (0.18%)
- Ronald Reagan (write-in) – 5,309 (0.07%)
- Ted Kennedy – 4,052 (0.05%)
- Paul C. Fisher – 506 (0.01%)
- John G. Crommelin – 186 (0.00%)

1968 Democratic National Convention (Presidential tally):

- Hubert Humphrey – 1,760 (67.43%)
- Eugene McCarthy – 601 (23.03%)
- George McGovern – 147 (5.63%)
- Channing E. Phillips – 68 (2.61%)
- Daniel K. Moore – 18 (0.69%)
- Ted Kennedy – 13 (0.50%)
- Paul Bryant – 1 (0.04%)
- James H. Gray – 1 (0.04%)
- George Wallace – 1 (0.04%)

1968 United States presidential election

- Richard Nixon/Spiro Agnew (R) – 31,783,783 (43.4%) and 301 electoral votes (32 states carried)
- Hubert Humphrey/Edmund Muskie (D) – 31,271,839 (42.7%) and 191 electoral votes (13 states and D.C. carried)
- George Wallace/Curtis LeMay (American Independent) – 9,901,118 (13.5%) and 46 electoral votes (5 states carried)
- Eugene McCarthy (I) – 25,634
- Others – 243,258 (0.3%)

DFL primary for United States Senate from Minnesota, 1970:

- Hubert Humphrey – 338,705 (79.25%)
- Earl D. Craig – 88,709 (20.76%)

Minnesota United States Senate election, 1970:

- Hubert Humphrey (DFL) – 788,256 (57.75%)
- Clark MacGregor (R) – 568,025 (41.62%)
- Nancy Strebe (Socialist Workers) – 6,122 (0.45%)
- William Braatz (Industrial Government) – 2,484 (0.18%)

1972 Democratic presidential primaries:

- Hubert Humphrey – 4,121,372 (25.77%)
- George McGovern – 4,053,451 (25.34%)
- George Wallace – 3,755,424 (23.48%)
- Edmund Muskie – 1,840,217 (11.51%)
- Eugene McCarthy – 553,990 (3.46%)
- Henry M. Jackson – 505,198 (3.16%)
- Shirley Chisholm – 430,703 (2.69%)
- Terry Sanford – 331,415 (2.07%)
- John Lindsay – 196,406 (1.23%)
- Samuel Yorty – 79,446 (0.50%)
- Wilbur Mills – 37,401 (0.23%)
- Walter E. Fauntroy – 21,217 (0.13%)
- Unpledged – 19,533 (0.12%)
- Ted Kennedy – 16,693 (0.10%)
- Vance Hartke – 11,798 (0.07%)
- Patsy Mink – 8,286 (0.05%)
- None – 6,269 (0.04%)

1972 Democratic National Convention (Presidential tally):

- George McGovern – 1,729 (57.37%)
- Henry M. Jackson – 525 (17.42%)
- George Wallace – 382 (12.67%)
- Shirley Chisholm – 152 (5.04%)
- Terry Sanford – 78 (2.59%)
- Hubert Humphrey – 67 (2.22%)
- Wilbur Mills – 34 (1.13%)
- Edmund Muskie – 25 (0.83%)
- Ted Kennedy – 13 (0.43%)
- Wayne L. Hays – 5 (0.17%)
- Eugene McCarthy – 2 (0.07%)
- Ramsey Clark – 1 (0.03%)
- Walter Mondale – 1 (0.03%)

1976 Democratic presidential primaries:

- Jimmy Carter – 6,235,609 (39.27%)
- Jerry Brown – 2,449,374 (15.43%)
- George Wallace – 1,955,388 (12.31%)
- Mo Udall – 1,611,754 (10.15%)
- Henry M. Jackson – 1,134,375 (7.14%)
- Frank Church – 830,818 (5.23%)
- Robert Byrd – 340,309 (2.14%)
- Sargent Shriver – 304,399 (1.92%)
- Unpledged – 283,437 (1.79%)
- Ellen McCormack – 238,027 (1.50%)
- Fred R. Harris – 234,568 (1.48%)
- Milton Shapp – 88,254 (0.56%)
- Birch Bayh – 86,438 (0.54%)
- Hubert Humphrey – 61,992 (0.39%)
- Ted Kennedy – 19,805 (0.13%)
- Lloyd Bentsen – 4,046 (0.03%)
- Terry Sanford – 404 (0.00%)

1976 Democratic National Convention (Presidential tally):

- Jimmy Carter – 2,239 (74.48%)
- Mo Udall – 330 (10.98%)
- Jerry Brown – 301 (10.01%)
- George Wallace – 57 (1.90%)
- Ellen McCormack – 22 (0.73%)
- Frank Church – 19 (0.63%)
- Hubert Humphrey – 10 (0.33%)
- Henry M. Jackson – 10 (0.33%)
- Fred R. Harris – 9 (0.30%)
- Milton Shapp – 2 (0.07%)
- Robert Byrd – 2 (0.07%)
- Hugh Carey, César Chávez, Leon Jaworski, Barbara Jordan, Ted Kennedy, George McGovern, Edmund Muskie, Jennings Randolph, Fred Stover – each 1 vote (0.03%)

Minnesota United States Senate election, 1976:

- Hubert Humphrey (DFL) (inc.) – 1,290,736 (67.51%)
- Gerald Brekke (R) – 478,602 (25.03%)
- Paul Helm (American) – 125,612 (6.57%)
- William Peterson (Socialist Workers) – 9,380 (0.49%)
- Robin E. Miller (Libertarian) – 5,476 (0.29%)
- Matt Savola (Communist) – 2,214 (0.12%)
