= Coscom Entertainment =

Canadian publisher

Coscom Entertainment is a Canadian publisher. It is mainly known for comic books, although it is now publishing an increasing range of mashup books combining classical public domain literature with zombie fiction.

Publications include Ryan C. Thomas's The Summer I Died, works by author and publisher A.P. Fuchs (a.k.a. Peter Fox), and Eric S. Brown's The War of the Worlds Plus Blood, Guts and Zombies, World War of the Dead and Bigfoot War. It has also published several other 'zombie-enhanced' pastische works of classic literature, such as The Undead Land of Oz, Robin Hood and Friar Tuck: Zombie Hunters, Dracula Versus Zombula, The Adventures of Huckleberry Finn and Zombie Jim, Anna Karnivora and Alice in Zombieland.

The company also published the 475-page flash fiction collection Small Bites on zombies, animal attacks and were-creatures as a fundraiser for author Charles L. Grant's medical care.

== Authors ==
- A.P. Fuchs is Canadian horror/dark fantasy writer from Winnipeg, Manitoba. He is also the author of several novels. His work includes The Way of the Fog, Still About a Girl, Magic Man and April, the last of which was written under the pseudonym Peter Fox.
