= Jimmy Ryan =

Jimmy Ryan may refer to:

== Sports ==
- Jimmy Ryan (baseball) (1863–1923), American baseball player
- Jimmy Ryan (Australian footballer) (1879–1954), for Collingwood
- Jimmy Ryan (footballer, born 1945), English football player
- Jimmy Ryan (footballer, born 1988), English footballer with Fleetwood Town F.C.

== Music ==
- Jimmy Ryan (musician) (fl. 1990s), American musician, composer, producer and arranger
- Jimmy Ryan (vocalist), heavy metal vocalist
- Jimmy Ryan's (1934–1983), jazz club in New York City

== See also ==
- James Ryan (disambiguation)
- Jim Ryan (disambiguation)
