= Judge Ryan =

Judge Ryan may refer to:

- Harold L. Ryan (1923–1995), judge of the United States District Court for the District of Idaho
- Harold M. Ryan (1911–2007), judge of the Third Judicial Circuit Court of Michigan
- James L. Ryan (born 1932), judge of the United States Court of Appeals for the Sixth Circuit
- Margaret A. Ryan (born 1964), judge of the United States Court of Appeals for the Armed Forces
- Sylvester J. Ryan (1896–1981), judge of the United States District Court for the Southern District of New York

== See also ==
- Justice Ryan (disambiguation)
