= Jane Ryan =

Jane Ryan may refer to:

- Imelda Marcos, who uses a pseudonym "Jane Ryan"
- Jane Ryan Elementary School, a school in Trumbull, Connecticut

== See also ==
- Ryan (disambiguation)
- Jane (disambiguation)
