= Dead Man's Land =

2013 novel by Robert Ryan

- First edition
- Author: Robert Ryan
- Language: English
- Series: Watson at War
- Genre: Mystery fiction
- Publisher: Simon & Schuster
- Publication date: 2013
- Publication place: United Kingdom
- ISBN: 978-1-84983-956-3

Dead Man's Land is a 2013 novel by Robert Ryan, based in World War I. It involves Sherlock Holmes' sidekick, Dr. Watson (created by Arthur Conan Doyle). It was written under license from the Sir Arthur Conan Doyle literary Estate. It is the first in a series of Watson novels by Ryan set during the First World War.

== Critical reception ==
Barry Forshaw listed it in his 'Books of the year 2013: Crime'. The Daily Express gave it 5/5, saying "this is a genuinely fascinating and finely researched piece of war fiction."
