= Martin Ryan =

Martin Ryan may refer to:

- Martin Ryan (politician) (1900–1943), Irish politician
- Martin Ryan (rugby league) (1923–2003), English rugby league
- Martin Francis Ryan (1874–1935), American labor union leader

== See also ==
- Ryan Martin (disambiguation)
