= Robbie Ryan =

Robbie Ryan may refer to:

- Robbie Ryan (footballer) (born 1977), Irish footballer
- Robbie Ryan (cinematographer) (born 1970), Irish cinematographer

== See also ==
- Robert Ryan (disambiguation)
