= Jeff Ryan =

Jeff or Jeffrey Ryan may refer to:

- Jeff Ryan (ATF agent) (1972–2011), died in the Stevenson Ranch, California, shootout
- Jeff Ryan (baseball), on the 1998 College Baseball All-America Team
- Jeff Ryan (curler), Canadian curler
- Jeff Ryan (pole vaulter), 2003 All-American for the USC Trojans track and field team
- Jeffrey Ryan (born 1962), Canadian composer

== See also ==
- Ryan (surname)
