= John J. "Bald Jack" Ryan =

John J. Ryan (1862–1930) was an American gambler.

== Early life ==
Jack Ryan was born on August 9, 1862, in Cincinnati, Ohio. His parents, Michael Ryan and Helen Considine, were born in Ireland and came to the United States, probably through New York, in the 1840s. Michael was employed for most of his life in Cincinnati as a carpenter, making coffins, and as the keeper of the city morgue. He died in March 1903. Jack had three brothers: Edward, Michael, and Richard; and six sisters: Catharine, Anna, Elizabeth ("Honey"), Bessie, Mary, and Loretta. Except for Jack, whose remains were cremated, and Ed and Richard whose remains are buried in Calvary Cemetery in St. Louis, the remains of the parents and most of the rest of their children are buried in St. Joseph's Cemetery, in Cincinnati.

Ryan and his siblings grew up in Cincinnati. It appears the girls worked in factories. What the boys did is unclear but Ryan claimed to have worked as a clerk at the Reeds Hotel.

== Politics and business ==
Ryan began to be mentioned in newspaper articles in St. Louis in the early 1900s, when he and "Cuddy Mack" McGilcutty, attempted to take control of the City's Fourth Ward after the city's political boss, Ed Butler, had lost power after being convicted of bribery. Thomas "Snake" Kinney, later to become the longest serving Missouri state senator, resented Ryan's effort to muscle in on the graft-connected political scene. Kinney, whose gang operated with the Egan's Rats, sent Red Houlihan to Ryan's saloon to kill him, but Ryan gunned him down. Kinney tried to kill Ryan a second time, sending a gang of thugs to attack him in the street. They came upon Ryan at Twelfth and Grand, across from the Four Courts, and began shooting. Struck in the abdomen by a slug, Ryan returned fire before falling to the pavement. Recovering from his wound, Ryan left St. Louis.

Jack's Take From St. Louis

Bald Jack

Less than two years later, in the fall of 1902, Ryan reappeared in St. Louis as the operator of the John J. Ryan Turf Investment Company. Ryan became connected with George and John Considine of New York through his horse racing activities. In the early 1890s, George F. Considine had managed Jim Corbett in several of his heavyweight fights, and acted as stakeholder; he was also the owner of several hotels. The Considines were connected to Big Tim Sullivan who, as a Tammany Hall politician, controlled the territory of Manhattan below 14th Street. It is not known if the Considines (and Sullivan) were silent partners with Ryan in the turf investment scheme. After leaving St. Louis in 1901, Ryan got control of a piece of land in the suburbs of Covington, Kentucky, across the Ohio River from Cincinnati, which had been used as a racetrack in the past. He reopened the track as the Newport Race Track; acting as track manager he brought together a group of horsemen and began organizing races. At the same time, he opened a poolroom in Tuxedo Gardens, an unincorporated area a mile north of the track. He also operated a horse farm at Elkton, Maryland, where he claimed that he owned and bred a racing stable.

With this setup, Ryan returned to St. Louis, and opened an office for the John J. Ryan Turf Investment Company, and began offering shares of stock to the public at $5.00 per share. The shares came with five, $1.00 coupons attached, entitling the shareholder to cash in one coupon one week at a time. Investors were told that the company's capital was to be used to bet on the outcome of horse races at the Newport track selected by Ryan. Because of the lack of public transport there was no substantial public attendance at the races. It appears reasonably clear that Ryan, through his control of the track operations, controlled the outcome of the races. Whether or not the company took paper profits or losses on betting the horses, Ryan's game was a pyramid scheme. By paying large sums for newspaper advertisements, and mailing promotional literature, he attracted capital and used part of it to pay for the redemption of the coupons from shares sold earlier, skimming, in the process, huge sums for himself.

Between November 1902 and February 1903, Ryan's company gained 60,000 subscribers and accumulated capital of over $1 million. In February 1903, other "get rich quick" scams going on in the city collapsed when the public panicked; the panic spread to Ryan's operation, causing him to seek bankruptcy protection. At the end of the process, the company's creditors: paper manufacturers, printers, and newspapers, received a penny on the dollar.

John Folk, the city circuit attorney, indicted Ryan for fraud in late 1903. At the trial, the charge was dismissed by Judge Ryan O'Neill on the grounds that the subscription agreement the shareholders had signed made it clear that the risk of loss was theirs not Ryan's. According to his daughter, Marie Ryan, at the time the scheme collapsed, Ryan put over $800,000 in a satchel, and escaped the city in a buggy over the Eads Bridge into Illinois.

During this period, the U.S. Postal Department had become involved, investigating Ryan to determine whether any of his activities - using the mails to transact business, receiving money from subscribers, betting by mail etc., - were illegal. He was on the verge of being indicted in federal court, when he was granted immunity by becoming a federal witness, based on his claim that Postal Department employees had accepted bribes from him in exchange for allowing him to continue to operate. The trial of the alleged perpetrators eventually resulted in acquittal.

St, Louis 1904: Directed Verdict

Jack Cruising

In August 1903, Ryan appeared at Saratoga Springs, New York, and became known to the public attending the horse races as "Plunger Ryan", making $30,000 bets on the outcome of races. When the Saratoga meeting ended at the end of August, Ryan took his betting spree on to the New York tracks, Sheepshead Bay and Brighton Beach Race Course among others, winning on occasion as much as $70,000 on a single race, according to the New York papers.

Plunger Ryan Wins Big

By 1905, Ryan was back in Cincinnati, having been ruled off legitimate tracks by track managers who did not want the sensational publicity that he attracted. In Cincinnati, Ryan invested the money he escaped from St. Louis with in real estate and in a chain of vaudeville theaters he developed, which at one time extended from St. Louis to New York State. The chain drew its performers from a circuit established by Big Tim Sullivan and John W. Considine (not to be confused with George Considine's brother). Sullivan died in 1912, George Considine, in 1916. John Considine became Ryan's lifelong friend and business associate; his only friend as far as the record shows. The theater business collapsed in about 1913, probably the consequence of the collapse of vaudeville and a major change in the motion picture business and the manner in which films were distributed.

In February 1907, Ryan took his wife, Anna, and daughter, Marie, on a trip around the world. Leaving from Seattle on board the J.J. Hill owned steamer, SS Dakota, the trio went to Hawaii and then to Japan, where the ship sank on a sand bar in Yokohama in March. Finding another ship, the party went on to the Middle East, then to Western Europe ending up in Paris. They returned to the United States in November 1907, landing in New York just in time for the Panic of 1907 which drove the bulls out of Wall Street for a time, bringing the financial sector to ruins.

By 1911, Ryan was operating from a "cottage" he owned on Harsen's Island, in Lake St. Clair just off Algonac, a village located about thirty miles north of Detroit. From his theater business connections, Ryan had become acquainted with J. Stuart Blackton who was a principal founder of the Vitagraph Motion Picture Company. Blackton lived in a Long Island mansion, with a fleet of boats moored in the sound in front of his residence.

Jack at the Throttle

Thinking there was money to be made, Ryan formed a company with an Algonac mechanic named Chris Smith, to build a racing motorboat. The company was called the Smith & Ryan Boat & Engine Company and the one-step hydroplane boat the two men designed and built was called the Baby Reliance. Blackton bought the first of several of these boats and they were raced at regattas held at New York, Chicago and other places during 1910 and 1911. Ryan was at the wheel during several of these races and won, among others, the Wrigley Trophy, which was displayed for years in a window of Marshall Field's in Chicago. (Another reference has Blackton, owner of the power boat Baby Reliance II, and a member of the Atlantic Yacht Club of New York, winning the Wrigley trophy in August 1912.)

In the fall of 1913, Ryan became bored with the boat-building business and dumped Smith. According to his daughter, Marie, he took $100,000 from the company safe and walked away. Eight years later, as the Roaring Twenties began, Chris Smith, with his brothers, was building the great speed boats of the Chris-Craft line, selling thousands.(During World War I, Ryan got a contract with the Navy Department to build, using the Baby Reliance design, what was essentially a prototype PT boat. This episode ended in litigation.)) Ryan moved on to manage a famous casino at 21 West Elizabeth Street in downtown Detroit.

For a brief period in 1914, Ryan operated a gambling house in Detroit, called the Pelican Club; but the district attorney had it shut down quickly.

== Later life ==
Willard Counted Out

When Jack Dempsey met Jess Willard on July 4, 1919, at Toledo, OH, Ryan was there in the capacity of betting commissioner for Arnold Rothstein. Dempsey's manager, Doc Kearns, in the company of Damon Runyon, came to Ryan and asked for odds on the chance Dempsey might knock Willard out in the first round. Ryan offered Kearns 10 to 1 odds and Kearns put down a check for $10,000. Dempsey knocked Willard down seven times during the round, and when it ended, Ollie Pecord, the referee, had counted Willard out. Dempsey, at Kearn's urging, leaped from the ring, while Warren Barbour, the official timekeeper, screamed at Dempsey over the roar of the crowd to get back in the ring, or he would declare Willard the winner. Barbour claimed that the round had ended when Pecord's count had reached seven; because of noise, and a supposed fouling of the bell cord, no one had heard it clang. Whether of not Barbour was in conspiracy with Ryan to give Willard a chance to survive Dempsey's relentless attack is unknown, but Kearns lost his bet.

Jack's Place, Detroit 1923-25

Ryan, with law enforcement on his payroll, ran his Detroit club until the spring of 1925. He became associated with three men from St. Louis who would go on to become operators of famous gambling clubs. Lincoln Fitzgerald and Danny Sullivan, would open the Nevada Club in Reno, in the 1930s, and George "Dutch" Weinbrenner, would open the Christiana Club in Sun Valley. Weinbrenner set up a factory in Detroit to manufacture gaming equipment, under the auspices of a mob-connected company, B.C. Willis. These three men, along with Ryan and the Werthheimer brothers, operated a number of gambling clubs in Detroit, including the Chesterfield Club in Macomb County, Michigan, which, thanks to bribes paid to authorities, stayed open to about 1939. By that time Fitzgerald and Sullivan had moved on to Reno and "Dutch" Weinbrenner, who had married Ryan's daughter, Helen, to Sun Valley.

By 1925, with Ryan now aged 65, the gambling business in Detroit took a dark turn when Italian mobsters began battling the Purple Gang for control of the city's vices. The Italians kidnapped gamblers, including Ryan and "Dutch" Weinbrenner, holding them hostage for ransom. They hired the Purple Gang, led by Joe Burnstein, as protection and the result was open gangster warfare in the city. Ryan decided to retire.

Ryan gave a Lincoln dealer a promissory note for $3,500, apparently signed by his brother Ed. In exchange the dealer allowed him to drive a car off the lot. In August 1925, Ryan, in the company of a young woman named Flora, drove to El Paso, Texas, his plan was to end up in Los Angeles where he would meet his old friend, John Considine who owned a number of west coast movie theaters. Arriving in El Paso, Ryan was arrested by a federal officer on two charges: taking a minor across state lines in violation of the Mann Act, and grand larceny, the latter charge based on the fact that when the dealer presented the promissory note to Ed for payment he refused to honor it. The Mann Act charge was dropped when Ryan quickly married Flora. (Anna died in 1923.)

Returned to Cincinnati on the grand larceny charge, Ryan delayed the trial for almost two years. During this time Ed, who had sometimes run Ryan's operations in his absence, died, apparently leaving the State without the means of proving its case. At his trial in 1927, the judge directed a verdict in Jack's favor on the basis of the state's failure to prove its case. (The only trial Ryan lost occurred in 1910 when a civil action was brought by a man he had attacked in a rage in a Cincinnati bar, resulting in the man suffering an eye injury. The jury awarded the man $3,000.)

Upon dismissal of the larceny charge, Jack, with Flora in tow, resumed his trip to California, reaching Los Angeles in the summer of 1927. By the fall of 1927, Ryan took up residence on a parcel of land at a place called Potero, about thirty miles east of San Diego, on the road to El Centro, California. Potero is in the Cuyamaca Mountains, about a mile from the Mexican border at Tecate. Jack remained at Potero until his death in October 1930 at the age of 70. During this time, he managed a string of horses owned by Alexander Pantages and raced the horses at the Mexican border tracks. The house he lived in still exists, but it is rubble.

Ryan Obit San Diego Tribune 1930
