= Mark Ryan =

Mark Ryan may refer to:

- Mark Ryan (actor) (born 1956), British film, television and theatre actor
- Mark F. Ryan (1844–1940), Irish revolutionary and author
- Mark Ryan (Australian politician) (born 1982), Labor member of the Legislative Assembly of Queensland
- Mark Ryan (guitarist) (1959–2011), guitarist for Adam and the Ants
- Mark Ryan (Wisconsin politician) (1924–1985), Wisconsin State Assemblyman
- Mark W. Ryan, music editor for film and television
- Mark Ryan, alias used by Canadian-Armenian music composer, songwriter and producer DerHova

== See also ==
- Marc Ryan (radio personality) (born 1977), American radio personality
- Marc Ryan (born 1982), New Zealand cyclist
