= Ted Ryan =

Ted Ryan may refer to:

- Ted Ryan (footballer, born 1921) (1921–1960), Australian rules footballer for Collingwood
- Ted Ryan (footballer, born 1926) (1926–2003), Australian rules footballer for Footscray
- Ted Ryan (rower) (born 1957), Irish Olympic rower
- Ted Ryan (rugby union) (1912–1992), Irish rugby union player

== See also ==
- Edward Ryan (disambiguation)
