= Timothy Ryan (biochemist) =

American neuroscientist and biophysicist

Timothy A. Ryan
- Education: McGill University (BSc, MSc); Cornell University (PhD)
- Known for: Presynaptic biology Local ATP synthesis at synapses Optical reporters of synaptic function
- Awards: National Academy of Sciences (2024); American Academy of Arts and Sciences (2024); Javits Award (2016); McKnight Technological Innovations in Neuroscience Award (2000, 2010)
- Scientific career
- Fields: Neuroscience, Biophysics
- Workplaces: Weill Cornell Medicine; Howard Hughes Medical Institute
- Doctoral advisor: Watt W. Webb
- Website: sites.google.com/site/ryanlab1/Home

Timothy A. Ryan is a Canadian neuroscientist and biophysicist. He is a Tri-Institutional Professor of Biochemistry at Weill Cornell Medicine and a Senior Scholar at the Howard Hughes Medical Institute (HHMI) Janelia Research Campus. He is an elected member of the National Academy of Sciences and the American Academy of Arts and Sciences.

== Education ==
Ryan received his Bachelor of Science and Master of Science in Physics from McGill University. He earned his Ph.D. in Physics from Cornell University. He conducted postdoctoral research in molecular and cellular physiology in the laboratory of Stephen J Smith at Stanford University before joining the faculty at Weill Cornell Medicine in 1997.

== Research ==
Ryan's research focuses on the molecular mechanisms of synaptic function, with a particular emphasis on presynaptic biology and neuroenergetics. His laboratory developed quantitative optical techniques to measure parameters associated with synaptic transmission. His work discovered that nerve terminals are highly sensitive to metabolic perturbations and that synapses must regulate ATP synthesis on-demand to match the bioenergetic needs of neurotransmitter release and recycling. He has also identified links between susceptibility genes for Parkinson's disease and the failure of synapses to maintain bioenergetic balance. In 2024, his team was awarded a significant grant from the Michael J. Fox Foundation to study organelle integration in Parkinson's disease.

== Awards and honors ==
- 2024: Elected member of the National Academy of Sciences
- 2024: Elected member of the American Academy of Arts and Sciences
- 2016: NINDS Javits Neuroscience Investigator Award
- 2000, 2010: McKnight Endowment Fund for Neuroscience Technological Innovations in Neuroscience Award
- 1999: Sloan Research Fellowship
