= Scott Ryan =

Scott Ryan may refer to:

- Scott Ryan (actor), Australian actor and writer
- Scott Ryan (Australian politician) (born 1973), Australian High Commissioner to Canada
- Scott Ryan (Ohio politician) (born 1965), member of the Ohio House of Representatives

== See also ==
- Ryan Scott (disambiguation)
