= Bob Ryan (disambiguation) =

Bob Ryan (born 1946) is an American sportswriter.

Bob Ryan may also refer to:

- Bob Ryan (mayor) (born 1963), American municipal politician and businessman
- Bob Ryan (meteorologist), meteorologist in Washington, D.C.
- Bob Ryan (rugby league) (died 2009), rugby league footballer of the 1940s and 1950s for Great Britain, England, and Warrington

== See also ==
- Bobby Ryan (disambiguation)
- Robert Ryan (disambiguation)
- Bob Bryan
