= Richard Ryan =

Richard Ryan may refer to:

- Richard Ryan (biographer) (1797–1849), British biographer, poet and playwright of Irish descent
- Richard Ryan (Medal of Honor) (1851–1933), American sailor and Medal of Honor recipient
- Richard Ryan (bishop) (1881–1957), English-born Australian bishop of the Catholic Church
- Richard Ryan (Royal Navy officer) (1903–1940), British Royal Navy officer awarded the George Cross, 1940
- Richard Ryan (diplomat) (born 1946), Irish poet and diplomat
- Richard Ryan (politician), politician in Montreal, Quebec, Canada
- Richard M. Ryan (born 1953), American professor of psychology

== See also ==
- Richie Ryan (disambiguation)
