= Robert S. Ryan =

American Engineer with specialism is Space exploration

Robert "Bob" S. Ryan is an American engineer who worked for NASA designing launch vehicles and coordinating technical training.

== Career ==
During his career at NASA, Ryan worked on launch vehicle and space systems design and technology development, and as a Technical Training Coordinator. He retired from NASA in 1996.

Ryan has also worked as an aerospace consultant for The Boeing Company on the Space Station design, and for Lockheed Martin Corporation in Huntsville on the Space Shuttle Super Light Weight tank design. He has consulted with NASA on the Space Launch Initiative, the Next Generation Launch Technology, Orbital Space Plane, the Exploration Program's Crew Launch Vehicle and Cargo Launch Vehicle, NASA NESC Smart Buyer Activity, Nuclear Propulsion Technology, MLAS Alternate Abort System test program and flight, Constellation Program, Commercial Launch Vehicles and Robust and Reliable Human Spacecraft System. In addition, he served as chairman of the X-33 Composite Fuel Tank Failure investigation, a member of the Air Force IUS failure team, and member of the Joint NASA and Air Force Launch Vehicle Integration 120 Day Study Team.

== Publications ==
He is a contributing editor on the text book "Textbook for Space Transportation System Design" and "System Engineering". He is a co-author on the NASA TP "Launch Vehicle Design Process"; NASA CR "Lessons Learned in Engineering"; NASA CR "Engineering the System"; and is in the process of writing two additional NASA CR's: 1. "Coaching and Mentoring" and 2. "Engineering Excellence". He wrote a chapter in "50 Years of Shock and Vibration" and in "Systems Engineering" and an Agard Book, "Winds and Launch Vehicle Response".

== Awards ==
Ryan was a NASA Flight Honoree for the Space Shuttle 100th flight and received the NASA Outstanding Leadership Medal and three Exceptional Service Medals. His was an Associate Fellow of the American Institute of Aeronautics and Astronautics (AIAA) was named the Mississippi/Alabama Section AIAA Engineer of the Year, was honored with the AIAA Herman Oberth Award by the Mississippi/Alabama Section, received the AIAA Structural Dynamics and Materials Medal, and was awarded the first AIAA Crichlow Trust Prize ($100,000).

He is a 150 Distinguished Faculty Fellow of the University of Alabama, member of the Alabama Engineering Hall of Fame, University of North Alabama Alumni of the Year, and Morgan County Alabama Sports Hall of Fame.
