= Tim Ryan (engineer) =

- Known for: founding M-Audio

Tim Ryan is an American engineer, inventor and entrepreneur who is best known for founding Midiman (later renamed M-Audio). As of 2004 he works with Avid Technology.

== Early career ==
Ryan grew up the son of a concert pianist and developed a love of music from an early age, but he did not become a musician himself. While working toward a Bachelor of Arts degree at the California Institute of Technology, he excelled at science, math, and engineering, and decided to apply those skills to his love of music. According to Ryan, in 1977 he and two fellow Caltech students Alan Danziger and Don Lieberman were looking at some of E-mu Systems products selling for about $400, and thought that, considering the wholesale cost of the electronic parts involved was about $15, they could produce a similar product and sell it for half the price.

What the students ended up designing instead was one of the first digital synthesizers, the 800-chip Con Brio, Inc. Advanced Digital Synthesizer (ADS), which utilized three 6502 processors, the same processor used in the Apple II computer and Commodore 64. The ADS offered an advanced feature set for its time: 64 oscillators which could be both amplitude- and frequency-modulated, split keyboard capability, 16-stage envelopes, layering and modulation, and multiple digital-to-analog converters. The resulting unit cost $30,000, but there was very little market for this kind of synthesizer. Con Brio produced three different examples of the ADS, but only sold one, which was used on some major studio film scores and then owned by Chick Corea. They ceased operations in 1982.

== Software and hardware ==
Ryan then co-founded Third Street Software, a Commodore and Apple software development company that did contract software development for Sequential Circuits, Syntech, and Sonus, including the first multitimbral sequencing software for Sequential's 600-series synthesizer. Ryan then helped design two of the best-selling US sequencers of the time, the Studio One (for the Commodore) and Studio Two (for the Apple II).

Having decided that he wanted to own his own company, he founded Midi Soft in 1988 and shortly thereafter renamed it Midiman, due to Yamaha already having rights to the Midi Soft name. Offering a variety of small, affordable MIDI problem solvers, sync devices, and interfaces, Midiman quickly established itself and later branched out into soundcards and audio interfaces, studio monitor speakers and MIDI keyboards, with the company's mission being "to increase virtualization, musical malleability, performance control and portability to an unprecedented level."

In 2002, Ryan was named the 2002 Los Angeles Ernst & Young Entrepreneur of the Year Award in the Media/Entertainment category. He was recognized for "founding and guiding a company that is currently one of the dominant suppliers in the computer-centric digital audio arena and one of the key players in the desktop recording revolution."

In 2004, Avid Technology acquired Midiman, Inc. (at that time doing business as M-Audio) and kept Ryan on board with the company as general manager.
