= Jack Ryan (footballer, born 1873) =

Australian rules footballer

Personal information
- Full name: John Daniel Ryan
- Born: 24 June 1873; Clunes, Victoria
- Died: 30 November 1931 (aged 58); Creswick, Victoria
- Original team: Creswick

Playing career^{1}
Years	Club	Games (Goals)
1899	St Kilda	1 (0)
- ^{1} Playing statistics correct to the end of 1899.

Jack Ryan (24 June 1873 – 30 November 1931) was an Australian rules footballer who played with St Kilda in the Victorian Football League (VFL).
