= Johnny Ryan (Australian footballer) =

Australian rules footballer

Personal information
- Full name: Johnny Ryan
- Born: 18 September 1938
- Original team: Fish Creek
- Height: 185 cm (6 ft 1 in)
- Weight: 83 kg (183 lb)

Playing career^{1}
Years	Club	Games (Goals)
1959	Richmond	2 (0)
- ^{1} Playing statistics correct to the end of 1959.

Johnny Ryan (born 18 September 1938) is a former Australian rules footballer who played with Richmond in the Victorian Football League (VFL).
