= Bobby Ryan (disambiguation) =

Bobby Ryan (born 1987) is an American ice hockey player.

Bobby Ryan may also refer to:

- Bobby Ryan (footballer) (born 1979), Irish footballer
- Bobby Ryan (hurler) (born 1961), retired Irish hurler

== See also ==
- Bob Ryan (disambiguation)
- Robert Ryan (disambiguation)
