= Robert Ryan (writer) =

English author, journalist and screenwriter

Robert Ryan (born c.1951), also known as Tom Neale, is an English author, journalist and screenwriter. Born in Liverpool, he moved to London to study natural sciences at university and began his writing career in the late 1980s for The Face, Arena and the US edition of GQ, and then Sunday Times. Most of his novels are set in historical wars, such as World War I and World War II.

== Career ==
Ryan published his first novel, Underdogs, in 1999 and collaborated with jazz trumpeter Guy Barker on an extended version of a piece called Underdogs, based on the novel. As of 2010, he published eleven more novels and was working on a novel due for release in 2011. His most successful and acclaimed novels as of 2010 are Death on the Ice, which was praised and recommended by the Antarctic Heritage Trust, and Empire of Sand, inspired by David Lean’s Lawrence of Arabia, to end the book where the film begins. He is also known for his "Morning, Noon and Night" series of books, Early One Morning (2002), The Blue Noon (2003), Night Crossing (2004), and After Midnight (2005), and for the "Vince Piper" series he wrote under the pseudonym Tom Neale: Steel Rain (2005) and Copper Kiss (2006). His Watson at War thrillers feature Dr. Watson from the Sherlock Holmes stories, getting caught up in various conflicts during the First World War.

Using the pseudonym R. J. Bailey, Robert Ryan and his wife Deborah Ryan collaboratively write the Sam Wylde series of mysteries.

== Novels ==
- Underdogs (1999)
- Nine Mil (2000)
- Trans Am (2001)
- The Last Sunrise (2006)
- Dying Day (2007)
- Empire of Sand (2008)
- Death on the Ice (2009)
- Sunset Road (2010)
- Signal Red (2010)

=== Morning, Noon and Night series ===
- Early One Morning (2002)
- Blue Noon (2003)
- Night Crossing (2004)
- After Midnight (2005)

=== Vince Piper series (as Tom Neale) ===
- Steel Rain (2005)
- Copper Kiss (2006)

=== Watson at War series ===
- Dead Man's Land (2012)
- The Dead Can Wait (2014)
- A Study in Murder (2015)
- The Case of the Six Watsons (2015) (short story collection)
- The Sign of Fear (2016)

=== Sam Wylde series (as R.J. Bailey, co-written with Deborah Ryan) ===
- Safe From Harm (2016)
- Feel No Pain (2017) (short story)
- Nobody Gets Hurt (2017)
- Winner Kills All (2019)
