= Justice Ryan =

Justice Ryan may refer to:

- Edward George Ryan (1810–1880), chief justice of the Wisconsin Supreme Court
- Elmer W. Ryan (1902–1980), associate justice of the Connecticut Supreme Court
- Howard C. Ryan (1916–2008), chief justice of the Illinois Supreme Court
- James L. Ryan (born 1932), associate justice of the Michigan Supreme Court
- Michael D. Ryan (1945–2012), associate justice of the Arizona Supreme Court
- Sean Ryan (judge) (born 1948), judge of the Irish High Court

== See also ==
- Judge Ryan (disambiguation)
