= Thomas Jervis Ryan =

New Zealand policeman (1834–1901)

Thomas Jervis Ryan (c. 1834–1901) was a New Zealand policeman. He was born in Ireland in about 1834.

In 1861, he joined Otago's police force. In 1862, he moved to Palmerston. He oversaw gold rushes at places such as Lake End, Tokomairiro, and the Mt. Ida district. In 1865, because of his unenthusiastic work ethic and proclivity to alcohol, he was transferred from Canterbury province to Mackenzie County. Later that year, he was stationed in Waitangi (Glenavy), but was moved back to Mackenzie in 1866. In 1869, after being transferred more around New Zealand, he married Ellen Johnston in Dunedin. The next year he resigned from the police force. In 1872, and again in 1890, Ryan was arrested for assault. In 1901, he was sent to jail for theft and was transported to the Sunnyside Lunatic Asylum, where he died on October 14.
