= Wrigley Trophy =

Award given for motorboats

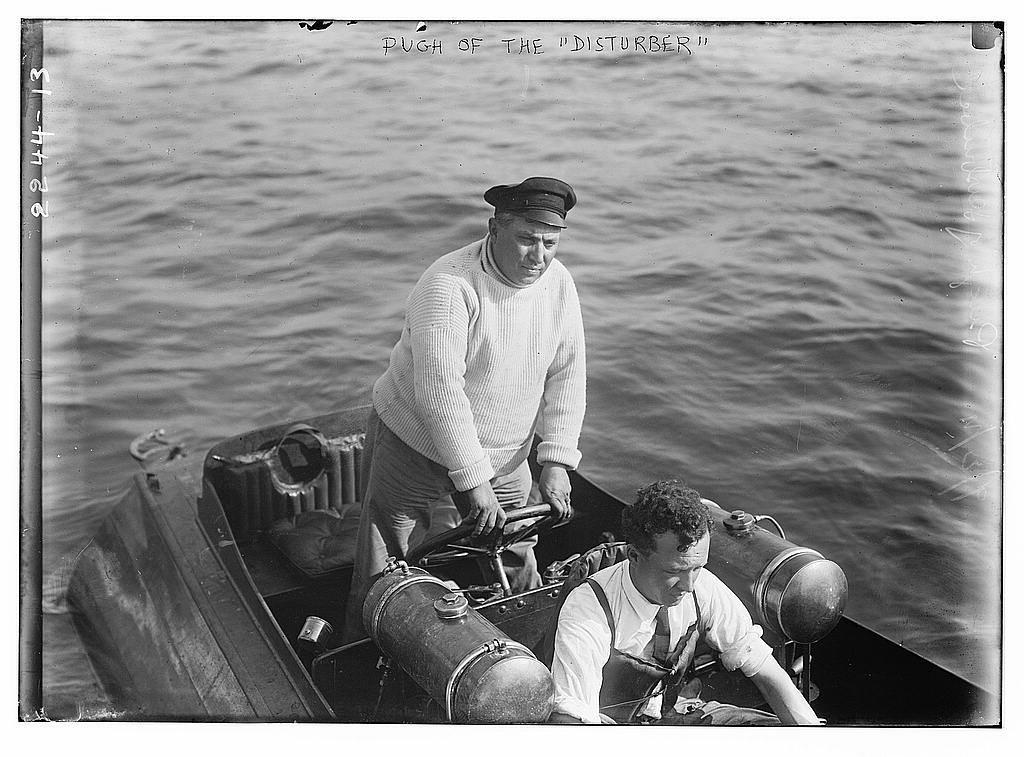
James A. Pugh of the Disturber III in 1912 who contested the awarding of the Wrigley Trophy

The Wrigley Trophy is an award given for motorboats. It was awarded as early as 1912 with a $1,500 cash prize. In 1912 the award was disputed when James A. Pugh contested the win by J. Stuart Blackton. He argued that Baby Reliance II was allowed a late entry and had already missed two rounds of competition.

== Winners ==
- Cassandra (raceboat); George Griffith (1960)
- Baby Reliance II, J. Stuart Blackton (1912)
