= Andrew Ryan =

Andrew Ryan may refer to:

- Andrew Ryan (BioShock), a character in the 2007 video game BioShock
- Andrew Ryan (rugby league) (born 1978), Australian rugby league player
- Andrew Ryan (diplomat) (1876–1949), British diplomat
- Andrew Ryan (actor), Australian actor
- Andy Ryan (born 1994), Scottish professional footballer

== See also ==
- Andrew Ryan McGill (1840–1905), American politician
