= Frank Ryan (Australian footballer) =

Australian rules footballer (1932–2011)

Personal information
- Full name: Frank Ryan
- Born: 1 May 1932
- Died: 28 May 2011 (aged 79)
- Original team: Hawthorn Colts
- Height: 175 cm (5 ft 9 in)
- Weight: 70 kg (154 lb)
- Position: Wing

Playing career^{1}
Years	Club	Games (Goals)
1951–57	Richmond	62 (4)
- ^{1} Playing statistics correct to the end of 1957.

Frank Ryan (1 May 1932 – 28 May 2011) was a former Australian rules footballer who played with Richmond in the Victorian Football League (VFL).
