= Barry Ryan =

Barry Ryan may refer to:

- Barry Ryan (Catholic priest) (born 1948)
- Barry Ryan (footballer) (born 1978), Irish footballer
- Barry Ryan (singer) (1948–2021), English pop singer and photographer
