= Ryan Martin =

Ryan Martin may refer to:

- Ryan Martin (boxer) (born 1993), American lightweight boxer
- Ryan Martin (athlete) (born 1989), American middle distance runner
- Ryan Martin (footballer) (born 1993), Samoan footballer
- Ryan Martin (ballet) (born 1973), American ballet dancer, ballet teacher and artistic director
- Ryan Martin (soccer coach), American soccer coach
- Ryan Martin, bassist with Smile Empty Soul
