= Ryan Field =

Ryan Field may refer to:

- Ryan Field (1926), a football stadium at Northwestern University in Evanston, Illinois, United States
- Ryan Field (2026), the new version of the stadium at the same site
- Baton Rouge Metropolitan Airport, also known as Ryan Field, in Baton Rouge, Louisiana, United States
- Ryan Airfield, also known as Ryan Field, in Tucson, Arizona, United States
- Ryan Field (sportscaster) (born 1977), American sportscaster
