= Richie Ryan =

Richie Ryan may refer to:

- Richie Ryan (footballer) (born 1985), Irish footballer
- Richie Ryan (politician) (1929–2019), Irish former politician
- Richie Ryan (Highlander), a character on the TV series Highlander: The Series

== See also ==
- Richard Ryan (disambiguation)
