= James Ryan (cricketer) =

English cricketer

Personal information
- Full name: James Henry Aloysius Ryan
- Born: 15 September 1892; Roade, Northamptonshire, England
- Died: 25 September 1915 (aged 23); Loos-en-Gohelle, France
- Batting: Right-handed
- Bowling: Right-arm medium

Domestic team information
- Years: Team
- 1911–1914: Northants
- 1912: Ireland

Career statistics
| Competition | First-class |
|---|---|
| Matches | 9 |
| Runs scored | 119 |
| Batting average | 8.50 |
| 100s/50s | 0/0 |
| Top score | 41 |
| Balls bowled | 229 |
| Wickets | 4 |
| Bowling average | 38.00 |
| 5 wickets in innings | 0 |
| 10 wickets in match | 0 |
| Best bowling | 2/51 |
| Catches/stumpings | 2/– |
- Source: CricketArchive, 5 November 2025

James Henry Aloysius Ryan (15 September 1892 – 25 September 1915) was an English soldier and cricketer who played for Northamptonshire County Cricket Club between 1911 and 1914. Ryan served as an officer in the British Army and was killed in action on the Western Front during World War I.

== Early life ==
Born at Roade in Northamptonshire, Ryan was educated at Downside School, where he was considered a "good athlete", captaining the cricket XI and playing in school the association football and field hockey teams, and at Wimbledon College. His father, Walter Ryan, was a surgeon who had played cricket for Northants in the 1880s and 90s before the team had first-class status.

== Military career ==
After leaving school, Ryan attended Royal Military College Sandhurst before being commissioned as a second lieutenant in the 1st battalion King's Liverpool Regiment in February 1912. He served initially at Fermoy Barracks in County Cork, before returning to England where the battalion was stationed at Aldershot. He was promoted to lieutenant at the beginning of August 1914, soon after the start of World War I.

Ryan's battalion embarked for France later in August, and he served on the Western Front throughout 1914 and 1915. He was awarded the Military Cross in January 1915 and was mentioned in dispatches in February after being promoted to captain. He was killed in action leading his men in an attack on Hill 70 at Loos-en-Gohelle in September 1915, aged 23. He is buried at Cambrin Military Cemetery.

== Cricket career ==
Ryan appeared in nine first-class matches as a right-arm bowler who Wisden described as "very useful". He made his senior debut for Northants in 1911, and in his nine matches scored 119 runs with a highest score of 41, and took four wickets with a best performance of two for 51. As well as eight matches for Northants, Ryan played once for Ireland whilst serving there in 1912 against the touring South Africans. He played cricket, football, and hockey whilst in the Army, including cricket for Sandhurst and Aldershot Command.
