= Derek Ryan =

Derek Ryan may refer to:

- Derek Ryan (ice hockey) (born 1986), American ice hockey player
- Derek Ryan (squash player) (born 1969), Republic of Ireland squash player
- Derek Ryan (singer), Irish country singer, also formerly of Irish band D-Side
