= Phil Ryan =

Phil Ryan may refer to:

- Phil Ryan (entrepreneur), English musician and early founder of The Big Issue
- Phil Ryan (footballer, born 1915) (1915–2014), Australian rules football player and administrator for Hawthorn
- Phil Ryan (footballer, born 1925) (1925–1982), Australian rules footballer for Collingwood
- Phil Ryan (footballer, born 1951), Australian rules footballer for North Melbourne
- Phil Ryan (musician) (1946–2016), Welsh musician
- Phil Ryan (sheriff) (1945–2026), sheriff in Texas
- Philip Ryan (1957–2013), Irish musician, known professionally as Philip Chevron
