= Peter Ryan =

Peter Ryan may refer to:

== Sports ==
- Peter Ryan (cricketer) (born 1951), Australian cricketer
- Peter Ryan (footballer, born 1891) (1891–1982), Australian rules footballer for St Kilda
- Peter Ryan (footballer, born 1936) (1936–2021), Australian rules footballer for South Melbourne and police superintendent
- Peter Ryan (footballer, born 1948), Australian rules footballer for Hawthorn
- Peter Ryan (rugby league, Newtown) (1933–2025), Australian rugby league footballer active 1953–1962
- Peter Ryan (rugby union, born 1930) (1930–2026), English rugby union player
- Peter Ryan (rugby union, born 1940), Australian rugby union player
- Peter Ryan (rugby, born 1971), Australian rugby league footballer
- Peter Ryan (racing driver) (1940–1962), Formula One race driver from Canada
- Peter Ryan (basketball), player in the Canada national men's basketball team in the 1970s

== Other ==
- Peter J. Ryan (1841–1908), Union Army soldier and Medal of Honor recipient
- Peter John Ryan (1925–2002), Australian surgeon
- Peter Ryan (columnist) (1923–2015), Australian newspaper columnist and author
- Peter Ryan (journalist) (1960–2025), Australian journalist
- Peter Ryan (police officer) (1944–2025), Commissioner of the New South Wales Police from 1996 until 2002
- Peter Ryan (politician) (born 1950), former leader of the National Party of Australia in Victoria
- Peter Ryan (singer), contestant on the first season of Australian Idol
- Peter Ryan (computer scientist), British computer scientist who devised Prêt à Voter
