= Edward Ryan =

Edward Ryan may refer to:

- Edward George Ryan (1810–1880), Wisconsin Supreme Court justice
- Edward Ryan (barrister) (1793–1875), English lawyer, judge and reformer of the British Civil Service
- Edward Ryan (actor) (1923–1998), American actor in The Fighting Sullivans
- Edward Ryan (Red Cross) (1883–1923), American Red Cross official
- Edward Ryan (rugby league) (fl. 1920s), Australian rugby league player
- Edward Thomas Ryan (born 1962), American bacteriologist and epidemiologist
- Edward J. Ryan, American football player and coach
- Edward Francis Ryan (1879–1956), American prelate of the Roman Catholic Church
- Ed Ryan (American football) (1925–2002), player for the Pittsburgh Steelers
- Ed Ryan (Australian footballer) (1902–1975), Australian rules footballer for Fitzroy
- Ed Ryan (hurler), played for Tipperary in the late 19th century and won the All-Ireland Senior Hurling Championship medal
- John Ryan (Australian soldier) (Edward John Francis Ryan, 1890–1941), World War I Victoria Cross recipient

== See also ==
- Ted Ryan (disambiguation)
