= Ryan, West Virginia =

Coordinates: 38°38′33″N 081°28′22″W

Ryan is a populated place in Roane County, West Virginia, United States.

The community was named after Thomas P. Ryan, an early settler and local minister.
