= C. W. Ryan =

American politician

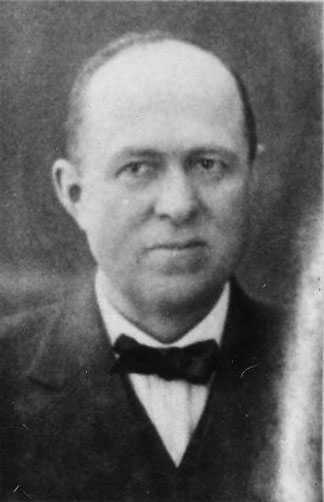
- Ryan in 1917

Member of the Washington House of Representatives for the 23rd district
- In office 1917–1931

Personal details
- Born: 1869 DeKalb County, Alabama, United States
- Died: May 2, 1944 (aged 74–75) Vancouver, Washington, United States
- Party: Republican

Cicero Wallace Ryan (1869 – May 2, 1944) was an American politician in the state of Washington. He served in the Washington House of Representatives from 1917 to 1931.
