= Thomas Francis Ryan =

Thomas Francis Ryan (1872 – November 19, 1961) was a Canadian sportsman and entrepreneur who created five-pin bowling.

Born in Guelph, Ontario, Ryan moved to Toronto at age 18. He is said to have been a baseball pitcher good enough for a professional offer, although the details are sketchy.

Ryan had been running a pool hall on Yonge Street and in November 1905 co-founded the Toronto Bowling Club above a store at Yonge and Temperance Street. Ten-pin bowling had been growing in popularity, but some of Ryan's customers complained that the ball was too heavy. Around 1909 he devised a new game with a smaller ball and only five pins, with a new scoring system. After receiving complaints about the pins bouncing out the window to the street, he added a rubber ring around the pins.

Ryan purchased the Turtle Hall Hotel in Toronto in April 1914 for $45,000. He later bought the former home of the Massey family, which he converted into an antique gallery and auction house. For decades, he was a judge of the Miss Toronto pageant. He remained a bachelor until he was 82, when he married his secretary.

Ryan died in Toronto at age 89. He was inducted into Canada's Sports Hall of Fame in 1971. He is buried in the Mount Hope Catholic Cemetery in Toronto, Ontario.

== Sources ==
- "Tommy Ryan made millions for others," Toronto Star, November 20, 1961, p. 12.
- "History of 5 Pin Bowling," Canadian 5 Pin Bowlers Association, retrieved November 11, 2006.
