= Mark W. Ryan =

- Occupation: Music editor

Mark W. Ryan also credited as Mark Ryan-Martin is a music editor for film and television, living in Los Angeles, California.

A two-time winner of the Motion Picture Sound Editors Golden Reel Award, he has worked on films such as Liar Liar as well as primetime television and animation shows. Also a singer, songwriter and guitarist, Ryan began his entertainment career as a drummer in his hometown of Cleveland, Ohio. He received a B.A. in music theory and percussion from Kent State University in 1983, and married before relocating to LA in 1986. He is credited as a voice-over actor in the 1991 animated series Little Shop, based on the film Little Shop Of Horrors, in which he voiced the character Paine Driller.

Ryan widened his activities to include music composition and supervision for television and film. His projects include the musical score for J. Pulk's short film Just For Sex, and the music promoting the NBA's 2009 Allstar Game 3D telecast from Phoenix, Arizona.
