= Jimmy Ryan (Australian footballer) =

Australian rules footballer

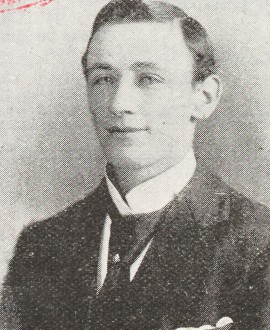
- Ryan in 1899

Personal information
- Full name: James Francis Ryan
- Born: 1 March 1879
- Died: 28 December 1954 (aged 75)
- Original team: Richmond City
- Height: 173 cm (5 ft 8 in)
- Weight: 71 kg (157 lb)

Playing career^{1}
| Years | Club | Games (Goals) |
| 1899 | Collingwood | 2 (0) |
- ^{1} Playing statistics correct to the end of 1899.

James Francis Ryan (1 March 1879 – 28 December 1954) was an Australian rules footballer who played with Collingwood in the Victorian Football League (VFL).
