= Paul Ryan (singer, born 1952) =

Welsh film reviewer and historian (1952–2022)

Paul Ryan (singer and author)
- Born: 30 December 1952; Cardiff, Wales
- Died: 26 July 2022 (aged 69); London, England
- Genres: Cinema of France, Jazz, Great American Songbook,
- Occupation(s): Film reviewer, historian, musician, jazz singer

Paul Ryan (born Christopher Paul Ryan; 30 December 1952 – 26 July 2022) was a Welsh film reviewer,. historian and jazz singer.

== Career ==
In 1978 Ryan moved to London and worked as a freelance film reviewer for The Guardian, The Observer and The Irish Times specialising in The Cinema of France, and as a commentator on erotic photography. He has interviewed over 150 actors, directors, producers and writers, such as Catherine Deneuve, Arnaud Desplechin, Jeanne Moreau, Philippe Noiret and Daniel Auteuil for the Institut Français and the British Film Institute, hosted the Institut Français Royaume-Uni's Ciné Lumière cinema, translated the American crime television series Columbo into French, and been awarded the Chevalier (Knight) (1996) and Officier (Officer) (2010) of the Ordre des Arts et des Lettres for significant contributions to French arts and literature by the French Ministers for Culture Jacques Chirac and Nicolas Sarkozy, presented in London by the French Ambassador to the UK, Maurice Gourdault-Montagne.

=== Music ===
From 2005, Ryan made a name as a jazz singer and "crooner" specialising in the Great American Songbook working with long-time friend, Musical Director and composer Kenny Clayton and jazz pianist and songwriter Jamie Safir. The London Evening Standard wrote that “all these kiddy-crooners around today think they’ve got the Sinatra touch but, believe me, they’re not fit to shine Paul’s patent-leather shoes”. Later in life, as a musician and socialite he earned himself a reputation as one of the best storytellers in Soho as illustrated in his last interview with Ian Shaw recorded for the Ronnie Scott's Radio Show, Jazz FM

== Personal life ==
Ryan died on July 26, 2022. He was married to the artist Sophie (née) Mortimer. He had a son from a previous relationship.

== Bibliography ==
- Ryan, Paul (1994). Marlon Brando: A Portrait. London: Carroll & Graf Publishers. ISBN 9780786700950.
- Anderson, Lindsay (2003). Never Apologise: The Collected Writings Edited by Paul Ryan. London: Plexus Publishing. ISBN 9780859653176.
- Sales Gomes, Paul Emilio (1999). Jean Vigo with a new afterword by Paul Ryan. London: Faber and Faber. ISBN 0571196101.
- Ryan, Paul (2000). The Sins of Our Fathers: A Study in Victorian Pornography. London: Erotic Print Society. ISBN 9781898998204.
- Butcher, Tony (2000). Man: Photographs of the Male Nude Introduction by Paul Ryan. London: St Martin's Press. ISBN 9780312264307.
- Speers, Vee (2006). Bordello: A collection of photographs with Essay "Bordello inside the Maison Closes" by Paul Ryan. London: Periplus Publishing. ISBN 978-1902699738.

== Discography ==
- 2017 Blame It On My Youth: Paul Ryan and Kenny Clayton (recorded live at The Pheasantry)
- 2022 Love Look Away: Paul Ryan & Jamie Safir
