= Jim Ryan (Australian footballer) =

Australian rules footballer, born 1918

Personal information
- Full name: James Joseph Ryan
- Born: 29 August 1918; Malvern East, Victoria
- Died: 4 June 2006 (aged 87)
- Original team: Old Xaverians

Playing career^{1}
| Years | Club | Games (Goals) |
| 1944 | Melbourne | 1 (0) |
- ^{1} Playing statistics correct to the end of 1944.

James Joseph Ryan (29 August 1918 – 4 June 2006) was an Australian rules footballer who played with Melbourne in the Victorian Football League (VFL).
