= Ryan C. Thomas =

American novelist

- Born: January 25, 1975 (age 51); Warwick, Rhode Island

Ryan C. Thomas (born January 25, 1975) is an American writer and editor based in San Diego, California. He is the executive editor for the southern California luxury lifestyle magazine Ranch & Coast and a horror author.

== Works ==
=== Novels ===
- The Summer I Died (Coscom Entertainment, April 2006)
- Ratings Game (Cohort Press, May 2008)
- The Undead World of Oz (Coscom Entertainment, September 2009)
- Born To Bleed (Coscom Entertainment, September 2011)
- Hissers (Permuted Press, December 2011)
- Origin of Pain (Thunderstorm Books, February 2012)
- Salticidae (Thunderstorm Books, March 2013)
- The Bugboy (Thunderstorm Books, February 2014)
- Hissers 2: Death March (Grand Mal Press, March 2014)
- Hissers 3: Fortress of Flesh (Grand Mal Press, March 2021)
- Hobbomock (Thunderstorm Books, May 2016)
- Scars of the Broken (Grand Mal Press, November 2017)
- Red Ice Run (Thunderstorm Books, Dec 2018)

=== Novellas ===
- Enemy Unseen ("The Undead: Headshot Quartet" collection, Permuted Press, March 2008)
- With a Face of Golden Pleasure ("Elements of the Apocalypse", Permuted Press, December 2011)
- Choose ("MalContents" collection, Grand Mal Press, October 2011)
- The Scent of Hope ("Salticidae" Limited Edition only, Thunderstorm Books, October 2013)

=== Publications to which Thomas has contributed short stories ===
- The Vault of Punk Horror
- The Undead: Flesh Feast
- The Undead: Skin and Bones
- Strange Stories of Sand and Sea
- Twisted Cat Tales
- Space Squid
- Dead Science: A Zombie Anthology
- Alien Aberrations
- Zombie Zoology
- Splatterpunk Zine #3
- Splatterpunk Zine #8
- Beasts: Genesis
- San Diego Horror Professionals, VOl 1
- San Diego Horror Professionals, VOl 2
- San Diego Horror Professionals, VOl 3
- C.H.U.D. Lives
- Splatterpunk Forever
- In Darkness, Delight: Masters of Midnight
- Next Door: A Horror Anthology
- Tales of Horrorgasm, Vol 1 Comic Book

=== Collections ===
- Scraps & Chum (Grand Mal Press, February 2016)

=== Anthologies Edited ===
- Monstrous: 20 Tales of Giant Creature Terror (Permuted Press, January 2009)
