= Frank P. Ryan =

Australian surgeon and naturopath

- Born: 1944 (age 81–82); Limerick
- Occupation: Physician

Frank P. Ryan (born 1944) is a British consultant physician, evolutionary biologist and historian of science. He is a pioneer of viral symbiosis in the evolution of the human genome.

== Biography ==
Ryan was born in Limerick and moved to England at the age of 12. He was educated at Thornleigh Salesian College and the Bolton Institute of Technology. He qualified MD from Sheffield Medical School in 1970. Ryan is a Medical Adviser to Sheffield Primary Care Trust and an Honorary Research Fellow in Evolutionary Biology at the Department of Animal and Plant Sciences, Sheffield University. He is a Fellow of the Linnean Society of London, Royal Society of Medicine and the Royal College of Physicians.

== Research ==
Ryan has introduced concepts such as aggressive symbiosis, viral symbiosis and holobiontic genome to evolutionary biology which have been developed by other colleagues.

In 1990, Ryan co-authored The Eskimo Diet with Reg Saynor. The book modern revealed the importance of omega-3 fatty acids in the diet and argued that consumption of fish oils can reduce the risk of heart disease. The same year, he co-authored The Eskimo Diet Cookbook.

Ryan's book Darwin's Blind Spot: Evolution Beyond Natural Selection, published in 2002 argued that Charles Darwin had an incomplete view of evolution as he missed the role of symbiosis in the evolution of life. The book has been positively reviewed in academic journals.

Ryan's Metamorphosis, published in 2011 describes the pioneering contributions of Vincent Wigglesworth and Carroll Williams to insect metamorphosis and more controversially the research of Donald I. Williamson who believed that metamorphosis is the result of the hybridization of distinct life forms.

== Selected publications ==
- The Eskimo Diet: How to Avoid a Heart Attack (Ebury Press, 1990)
- The Eskimo Diet Cookbook (Ebury Press, 1990)
- The Walnut Diet and Fitness Plan (Swift, 1993)
- The Forgotten Plague: How the Battle Against Tuberculosis Was Won - And Lost (Back Bay Books, 1994)
- Virus X: Tracking the New Killer Plagues (Back Bay Books, 1997)
- Darwin's Blind Spot: Evolution Beyond Natural Selection (Houghton Mifflin, 2002)
- The Brain Food Diet (Profile Books, 2007)
- Metamorphosis: Unmasking the Mystery of How Life Transforms (Oneworld Publications, 2011)
- Virolution: The Most Important Evolutionary Book Since Dawkins' Selfish Gene (William Collins, 2013)
- The Mysterious World of the Human Genome (Prometheus Books, 2016)
- Tuberculosis: The Greatest Story Never Told (Swift Publishers, 2019)
