= Jack Ryan (FBI agent) =

American FBI agent (born 1938)

John C. Ryan (born 19 June 1938) is a former Federal Bureau of Investigation (FBI) agent and police officer. He had been an FBI agent between 1966 and 1987 before being fired for refusing to investigate nonviolent activists. He lost his job in September 1987 ten months short of retirement. He was thus ineligible for a full pension. In a report by the LA Times, he stated his belief that the Bureau could reinstate him to a position which would not conflict with his personal beliefs that US involvement in Central America is "violent, illegal and immoral."

He was also a critic of COINTELPRO.
