= Francis T. Ryan =

United States Navy Medal of Honor recipient

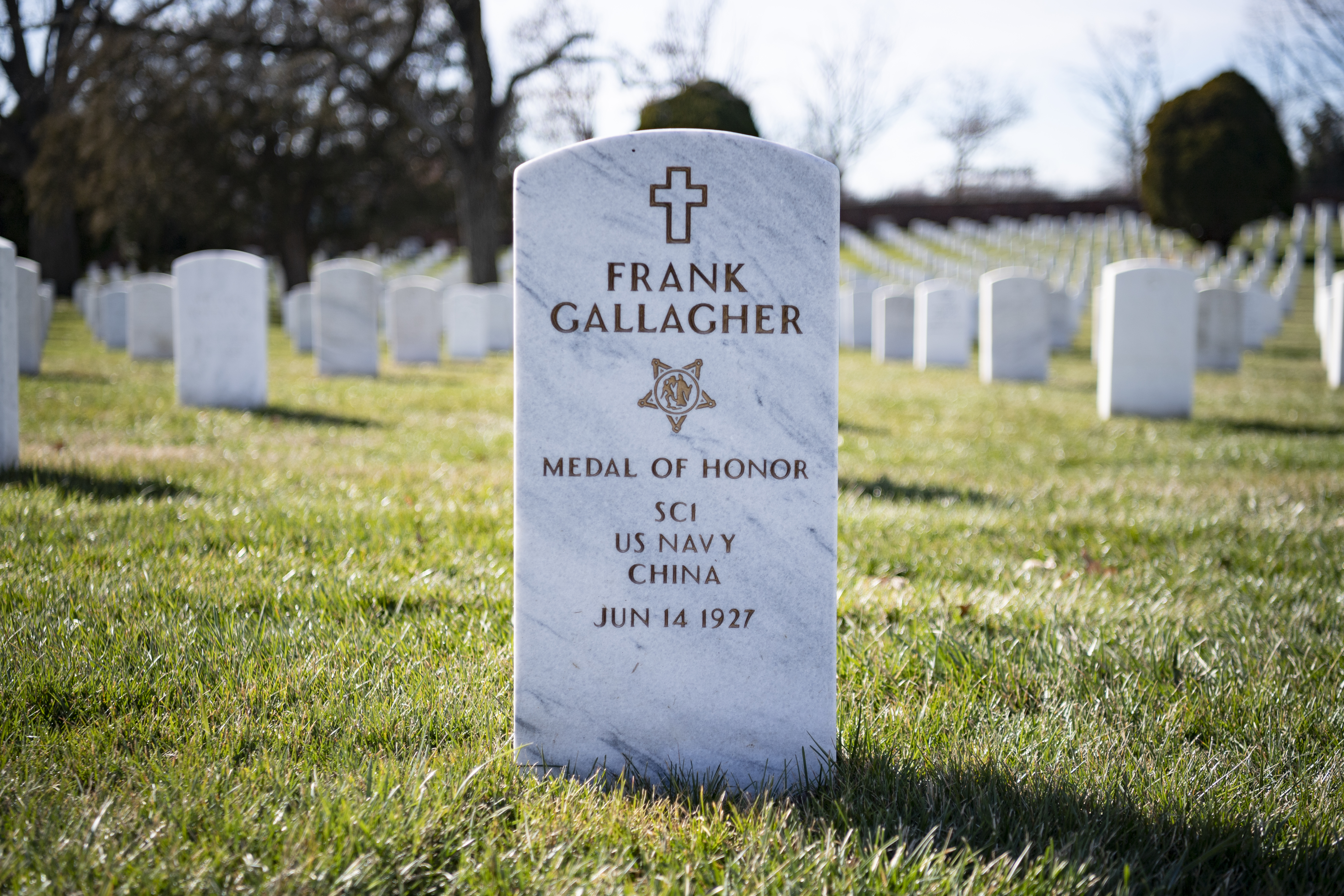
- Grave at Arlington National Cemetery
- Born: Frank Gallagher; April 6, 1862; Massachusetts, U.S.
- Died: June 14, 1927 (aged 65); Philadelphia, Pennsylvania, U.S.
- Burial place: Arlington National Cemetery; Arlington, Virginia
- Military career
- Allegiance: United States of America
- Branch: United States Navy
- Rank: Coxswain
- Conflicts: Boxer Rebellion
- Awards: Medal of Honor

Francis Thomas Ryan (born Frank Gallagher, April 6, 1862 – June 14, 1927) was an American sailor serving in the United States Navy during the Boxer Rebellion who received the Medal of Honor for bravery.

== Biography ==
Ryan was born April 6, 1862, in Massachusetts, and after entering the navy he was sent as a Coxswain to China to fight in the Boxer Rebellion.

He died June 14, 1927, at the age of 65, and is buried at Arlington National Cemetery Arlington, Virginia.

== Medal of Honor ==
Francis's rank and organization are as follows: Coxswain, U.S. Navy. Born: 6 April 1868, Massachusetts. Accredited to: Massachusetts. G.O. No.: 55, 19 July 1901.

=== Citation ===
In action with the relief expedition of the Allied forces in China during the battles of 13, 20, 21 and 22 June 1900. Throughout this period and in the presence of the enemy, Ryan distinguished himself by meritorious conduct.

== See also ==
- List of Medal of Honor recipients
- List of Medal of Honor recipients for the Boxer Rebellion
