= List of gay, lesbian or bisexual people: R =

This is a partial list of notable people who were or are gay men, lesbian or bisexual.

The historical concept and definition of sexual orientation varies and has changed greatly over time; for example the general term "gay" was not used to describe sexual orientation until the mid 20th century. A number of different classification schemes have been used to describe sexual orientation since the mid-19th century, and scholars have often defined the term "sexual orientation" in divergent ways. Indeed, several studies have found that much of the research about sexual orientation has failed to define the term at all, making it difficult to reconcile the results of different studies. However, most definitions include a psychological component (such as the direction of an individual's erotic desire) and/or a behavioural component (which focuses on the sex of the individual's sexual partner/s). Some prefer to simply follow an individual's self-definition or identity.

The high prevalence of people from the West on this list may be due to societal attitudes towards homosexuality. The Pew Research Center's 2013 Global Attitudes Survey found that there is “greater acceptance in more secular and affluent countries,” with "publics in 39 countries [having] broad acceptance of homosexuality in North America, the European Union, and much of Latin America, but equally widespread rejection in predominantly Muslim nations and in Africa, as well as in parts of Asia and in Russia. Opinion about the acceptability of homosexuality is divided in Israel, Poland and Bolivia.” As of 2013, Americans are divided – a majority (60 percent) believes homosexuality should be accepted, while 33 percent disagree.

== R ==
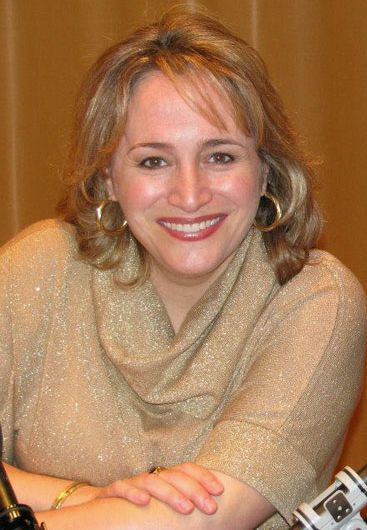
Opera singer Patricia Racette

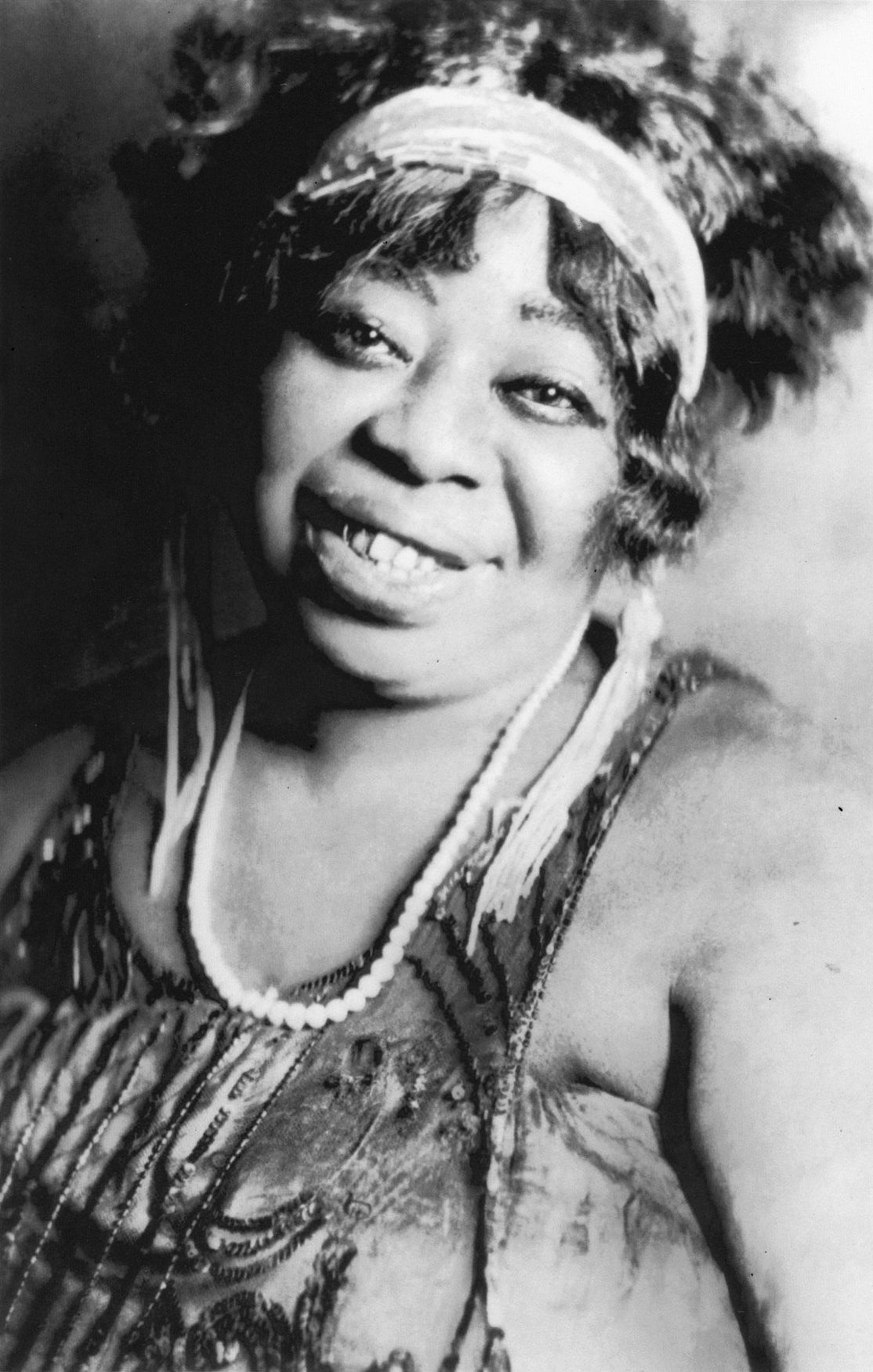
Blues singer Ma Rainey

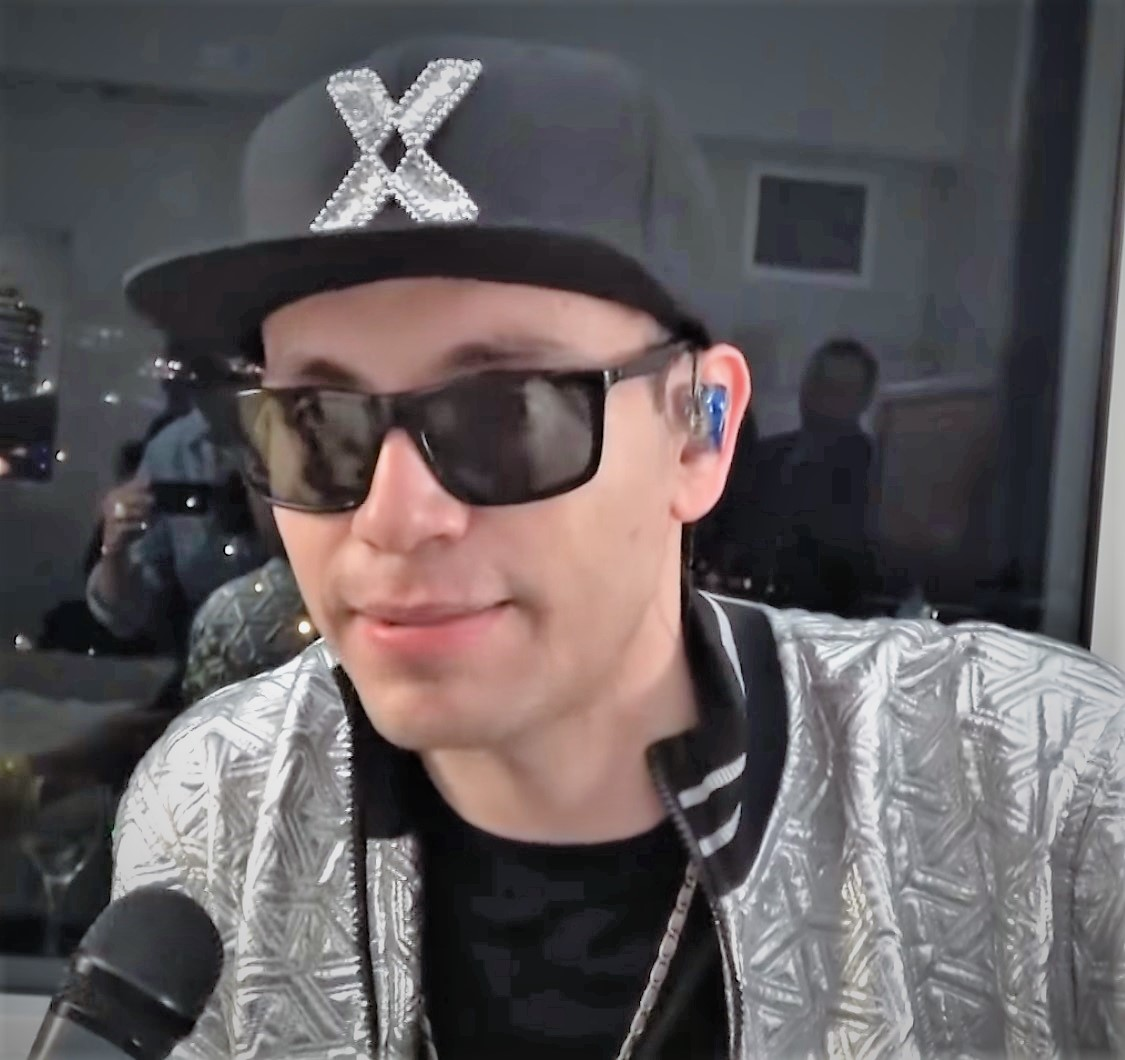
Musician and aerospace engineer Raymix

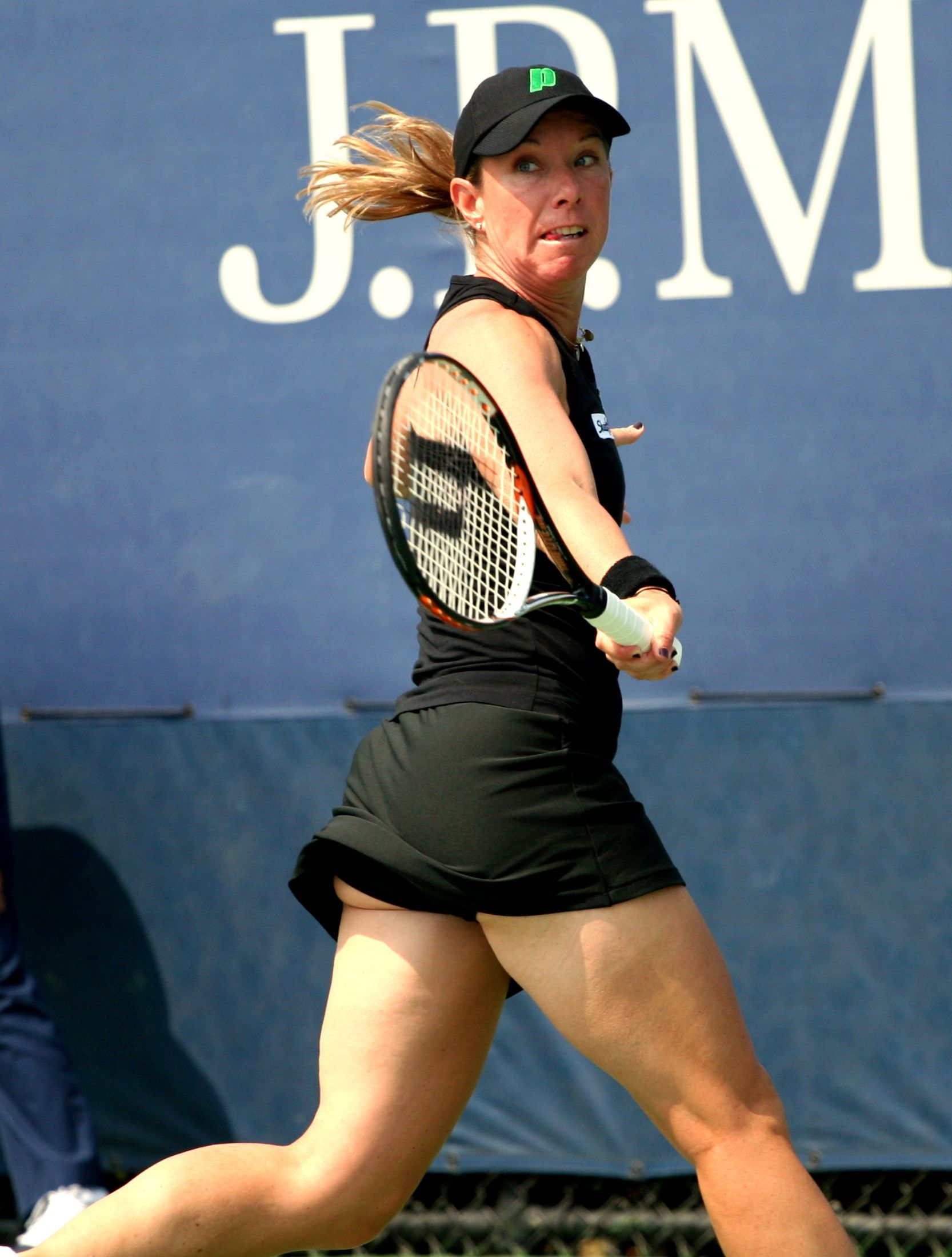
Tennis player Lisa Raymond

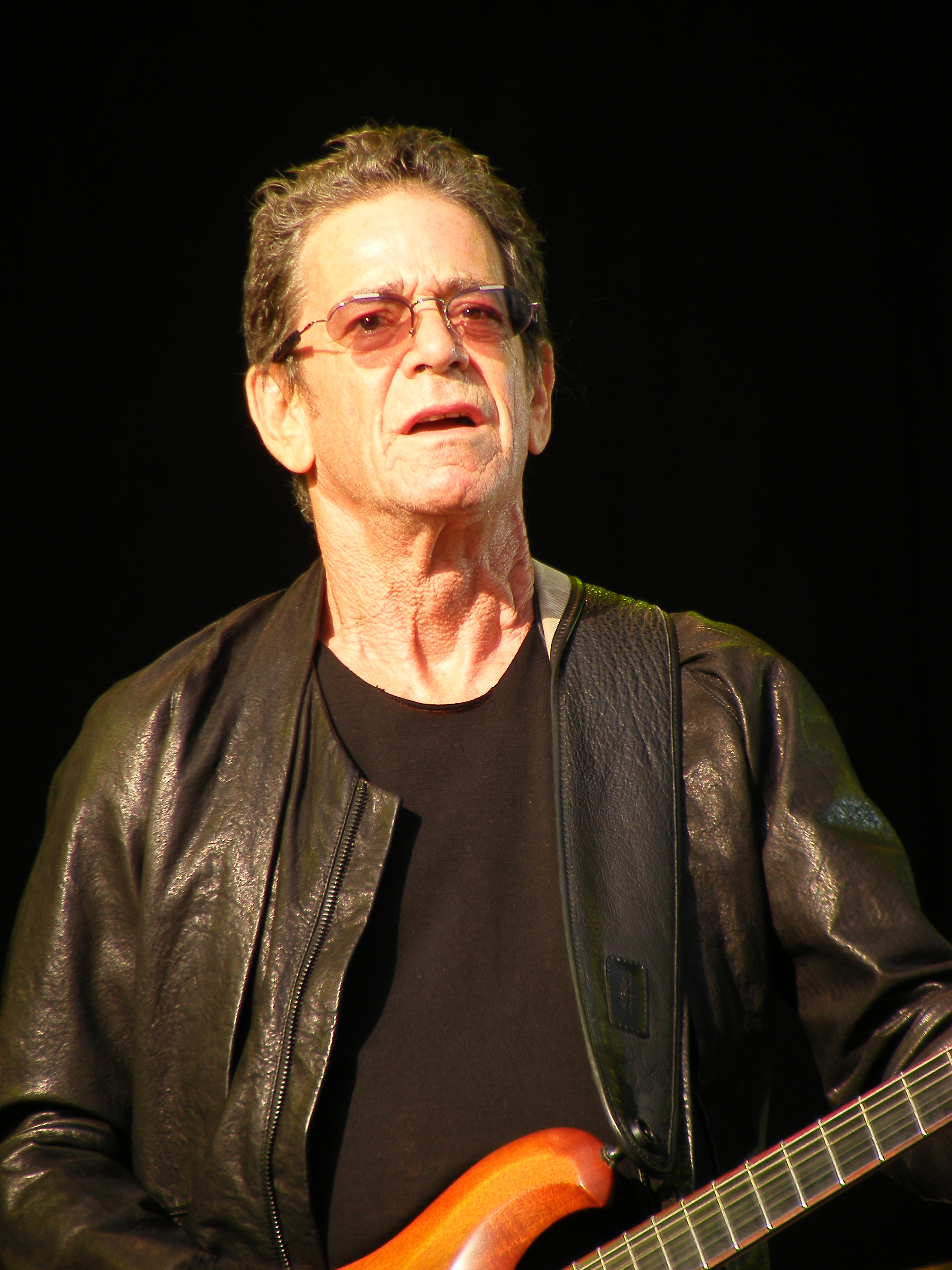
Musician Lou Reed

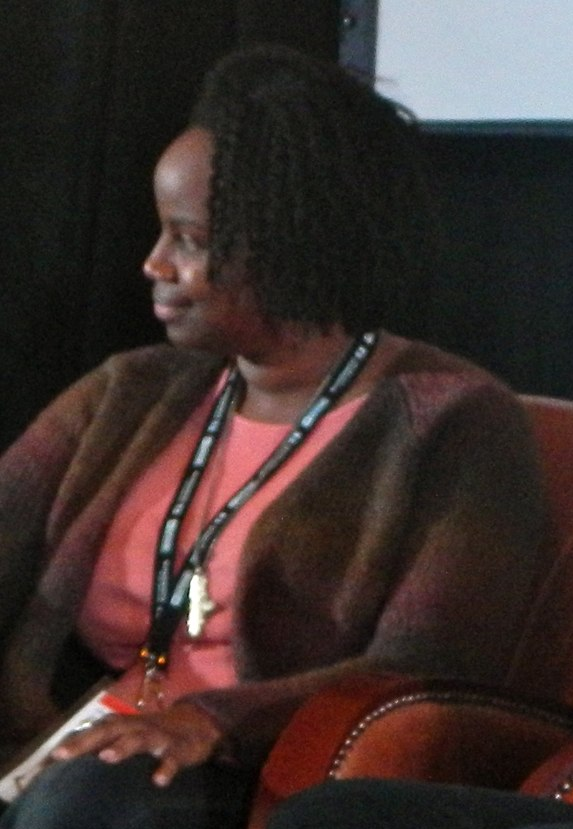
Film director Dee Rees

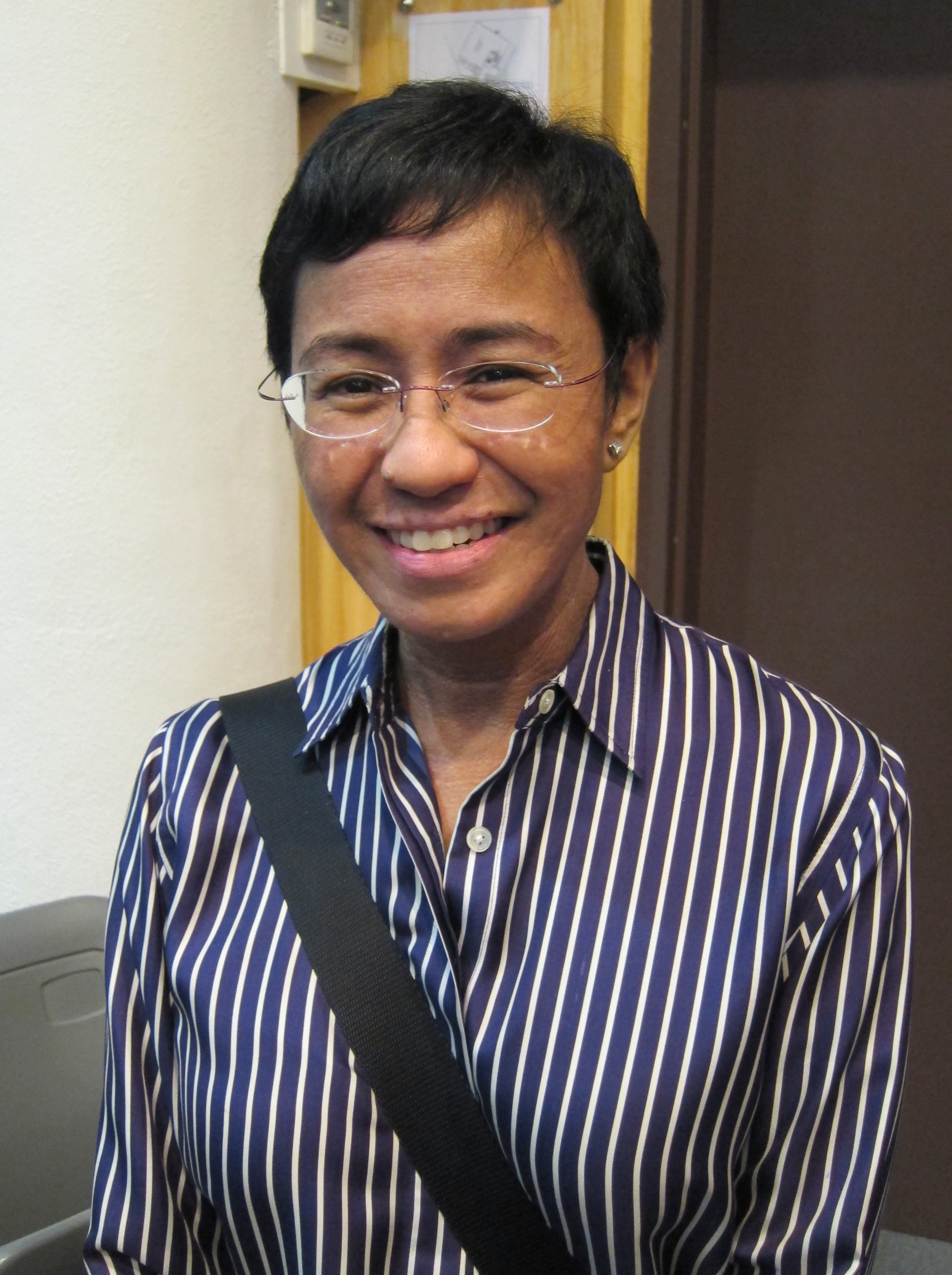
Journalist Maria Ressa

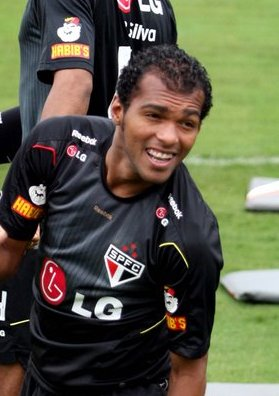
Footballer Richarlyson

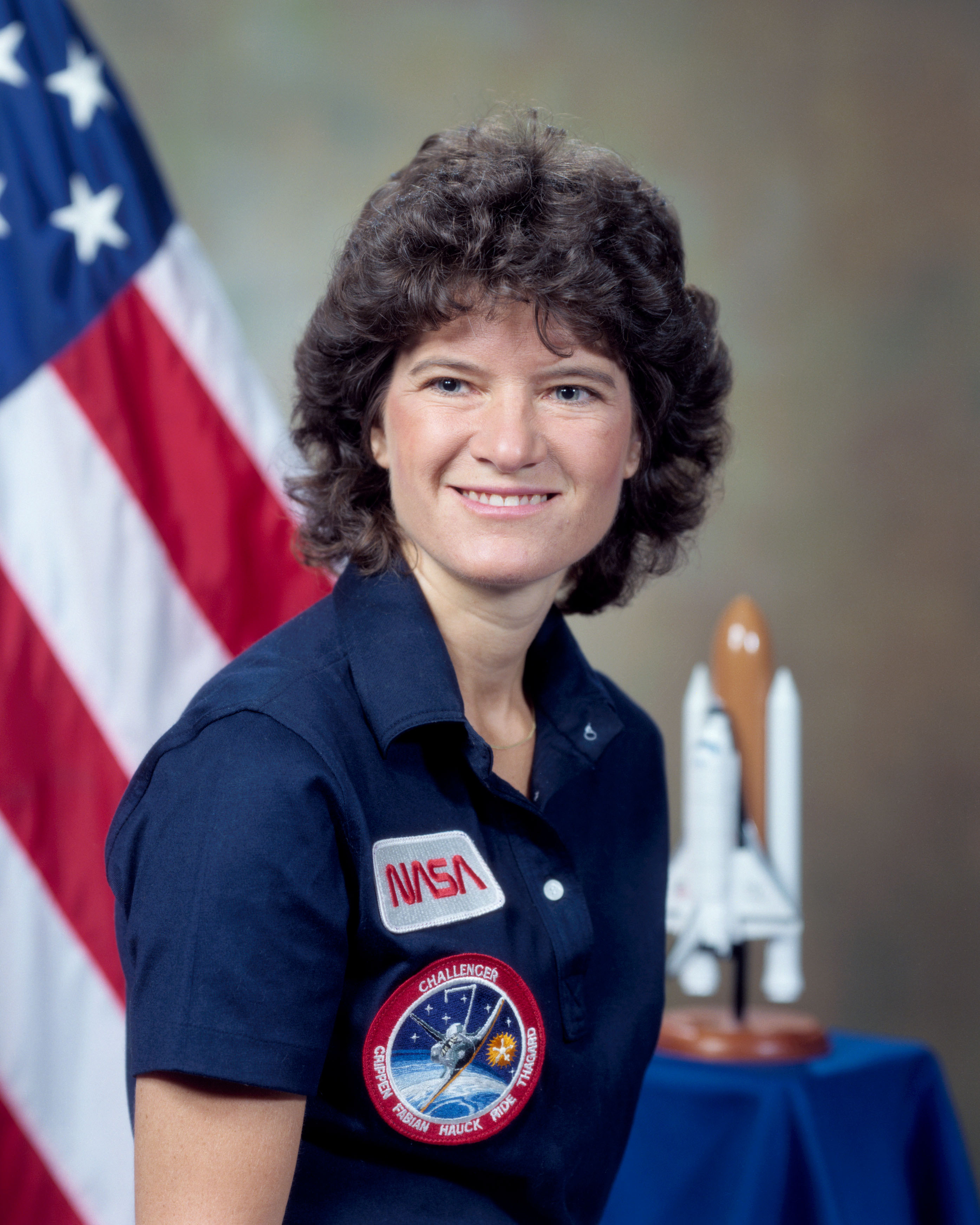
Astronaut Sally Ride

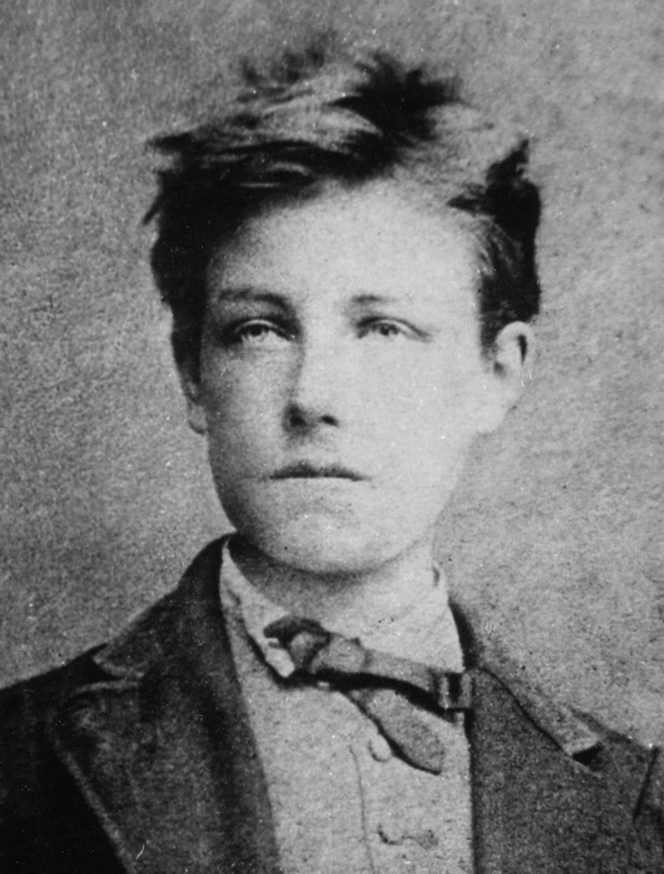
Poet Arthur Rimbaud

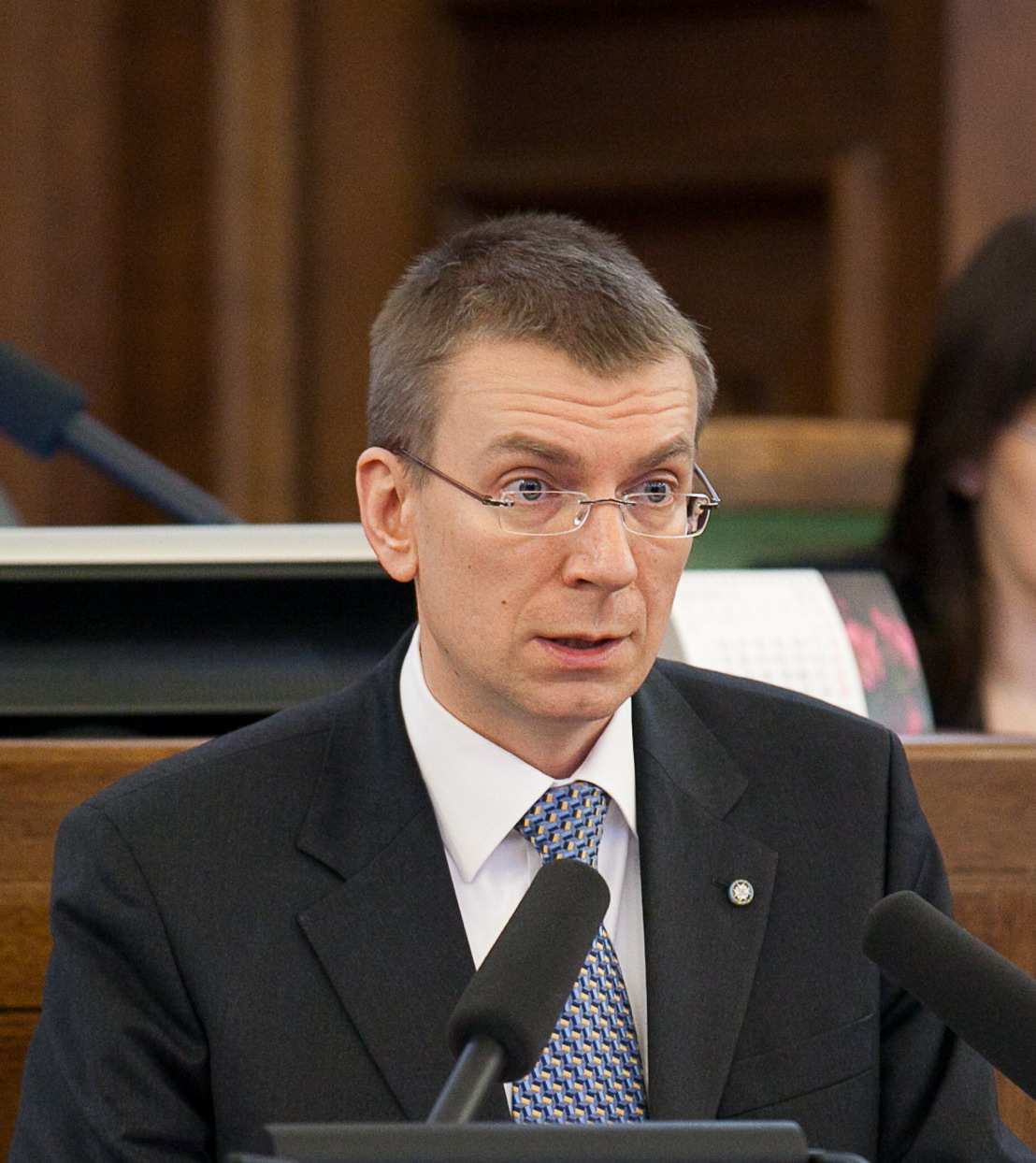
11th President of Latvia Edgars Rinkēvičs

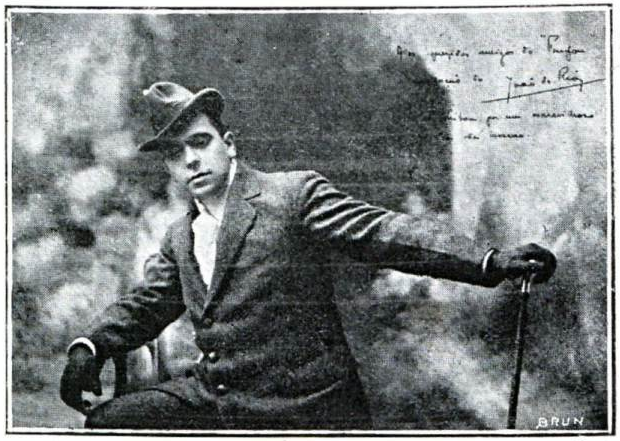
Author and journalist João do Rio

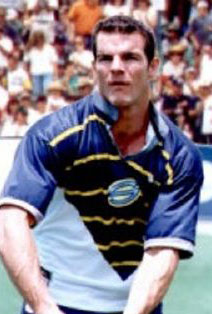
Footballer Ian Roberts

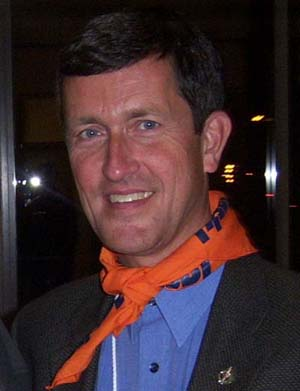
Politician Svend Robinson

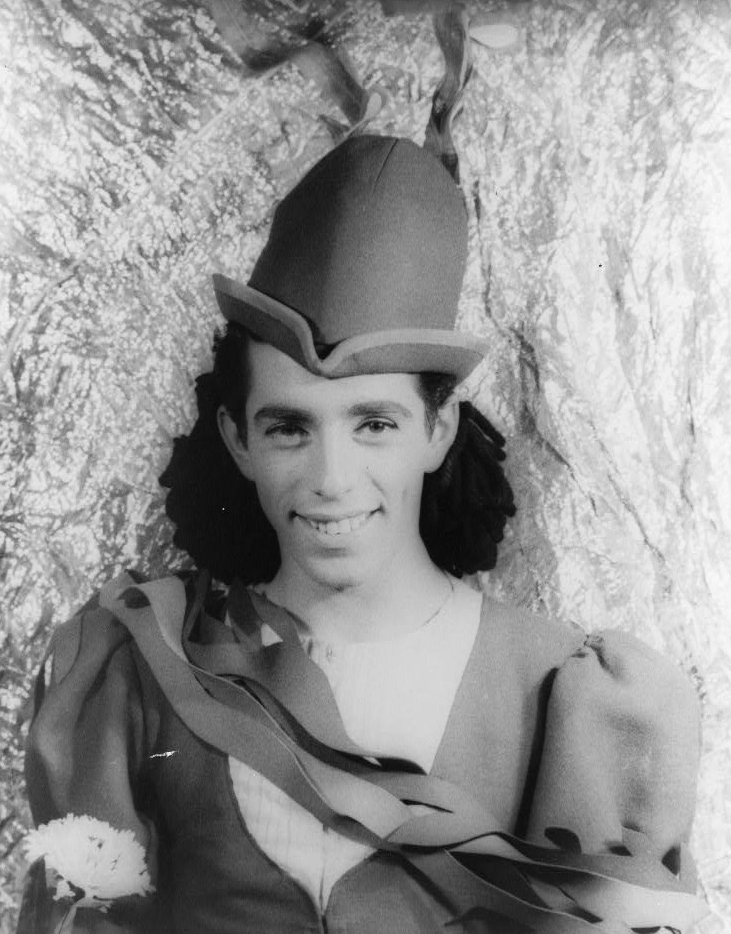
Choreographer Jerome Robbins

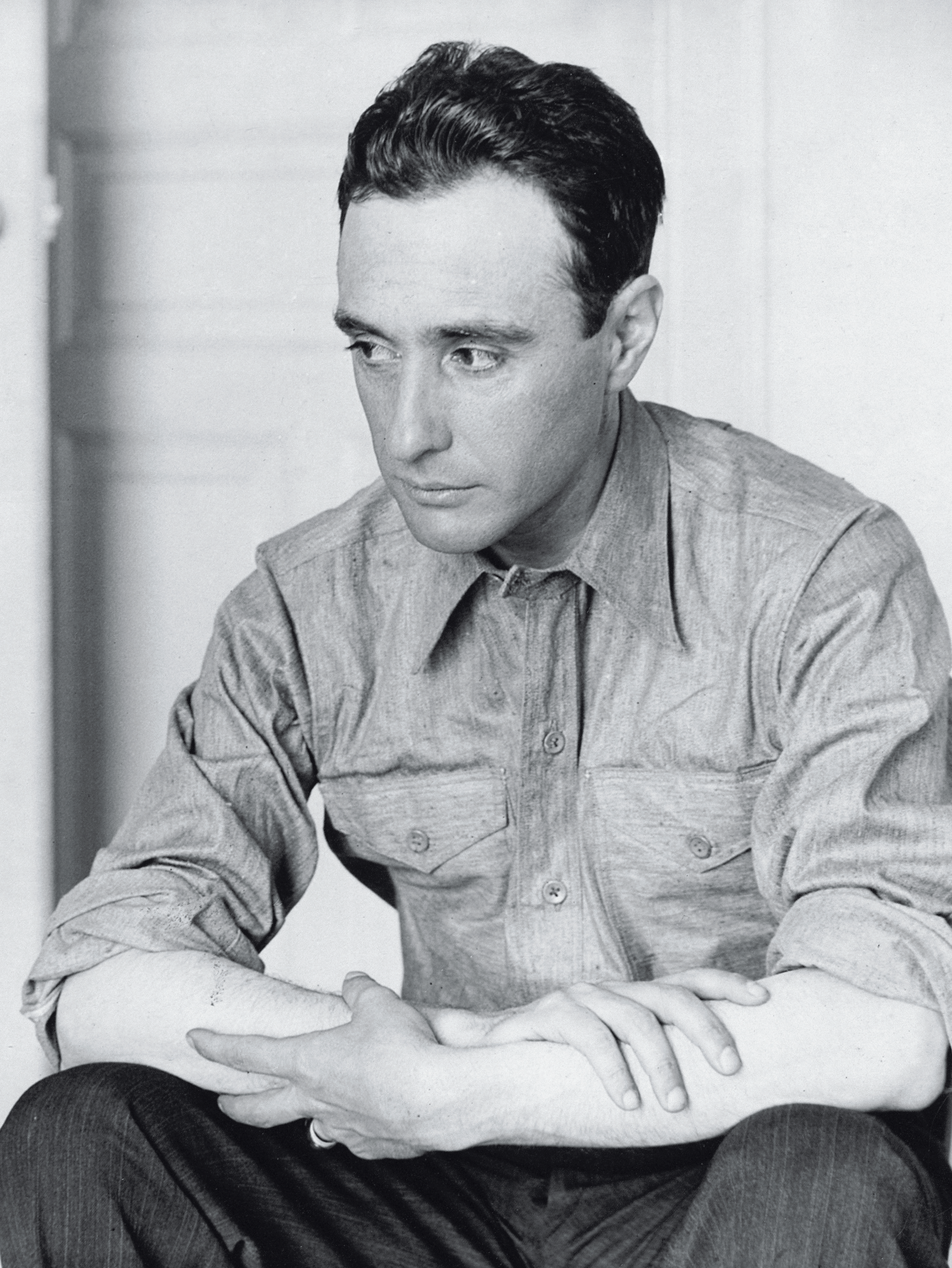
Artist Manuel Rodríguez Lozano

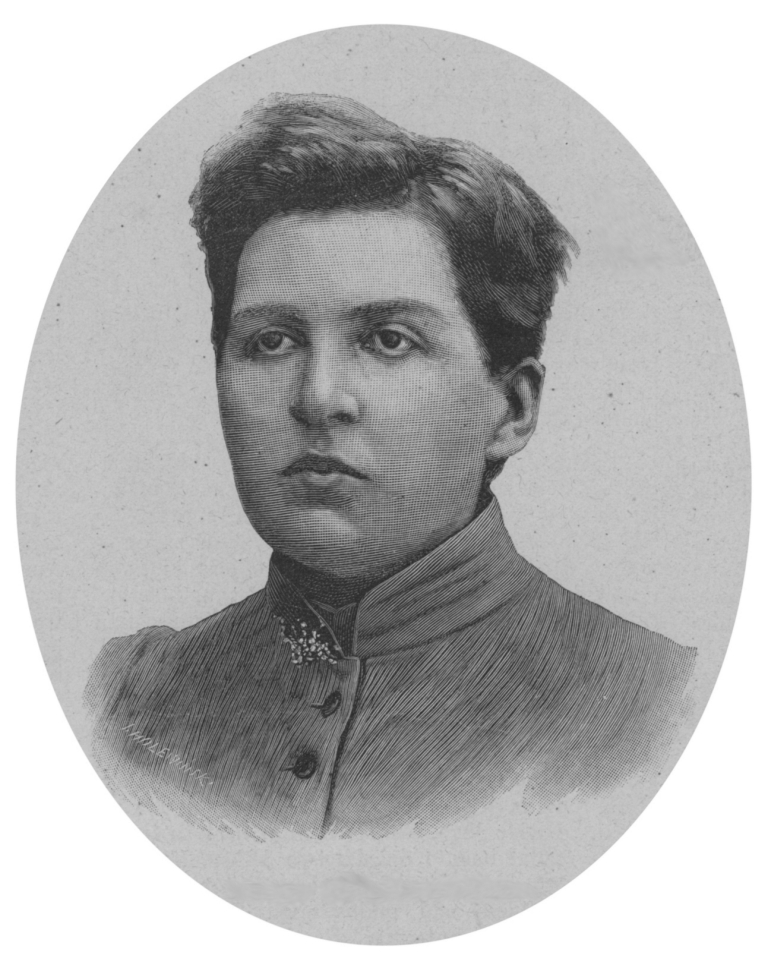
Writer Maria Rodziewiczówna

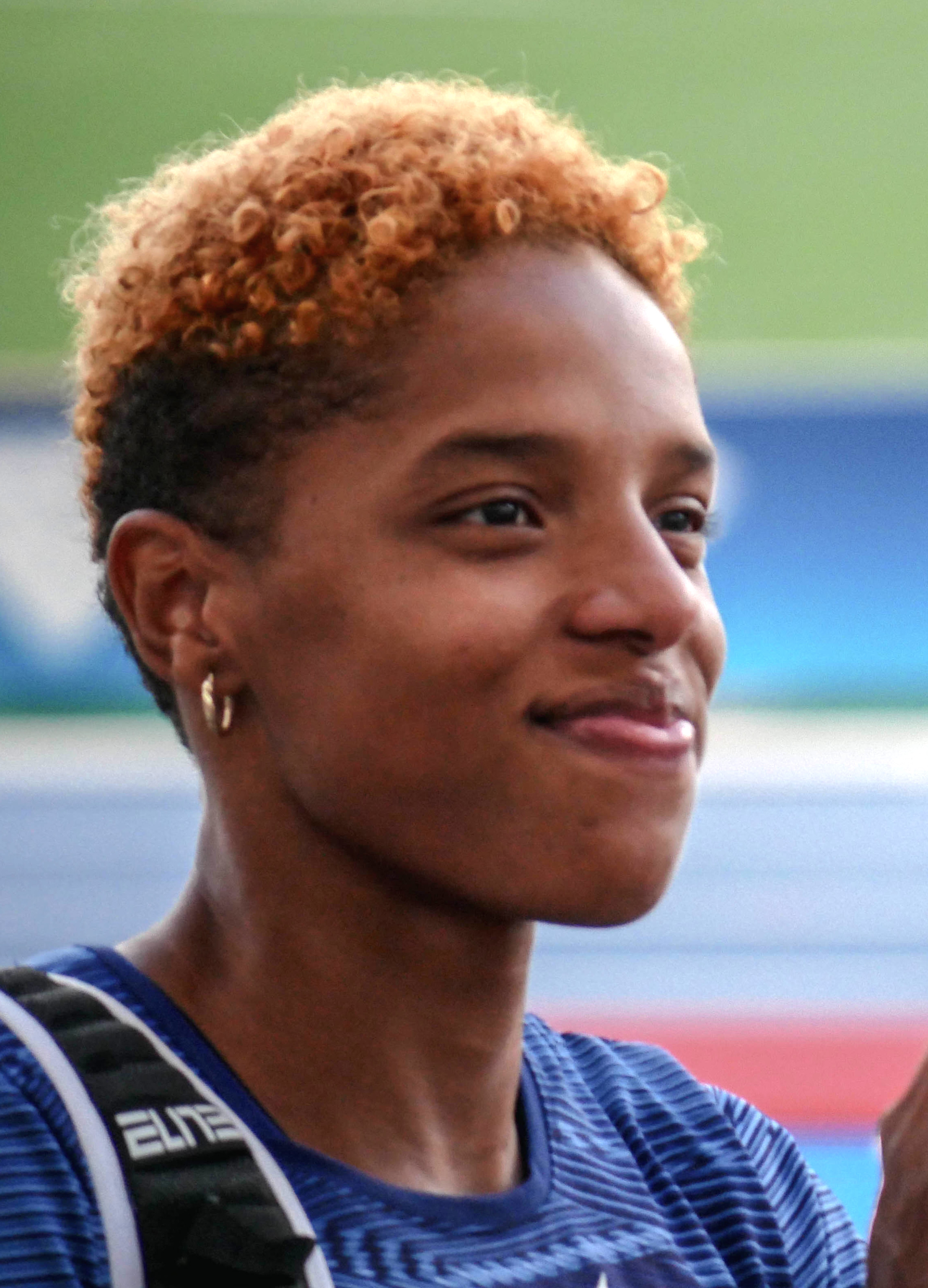
Track and field athlete Yulimar Rojas

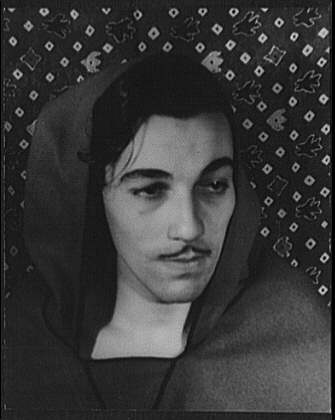
Actor Cesar Romero

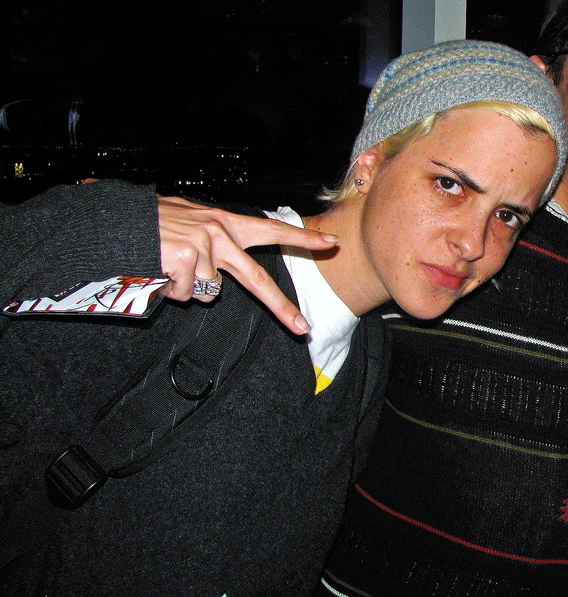
DJ Samantha Ronson

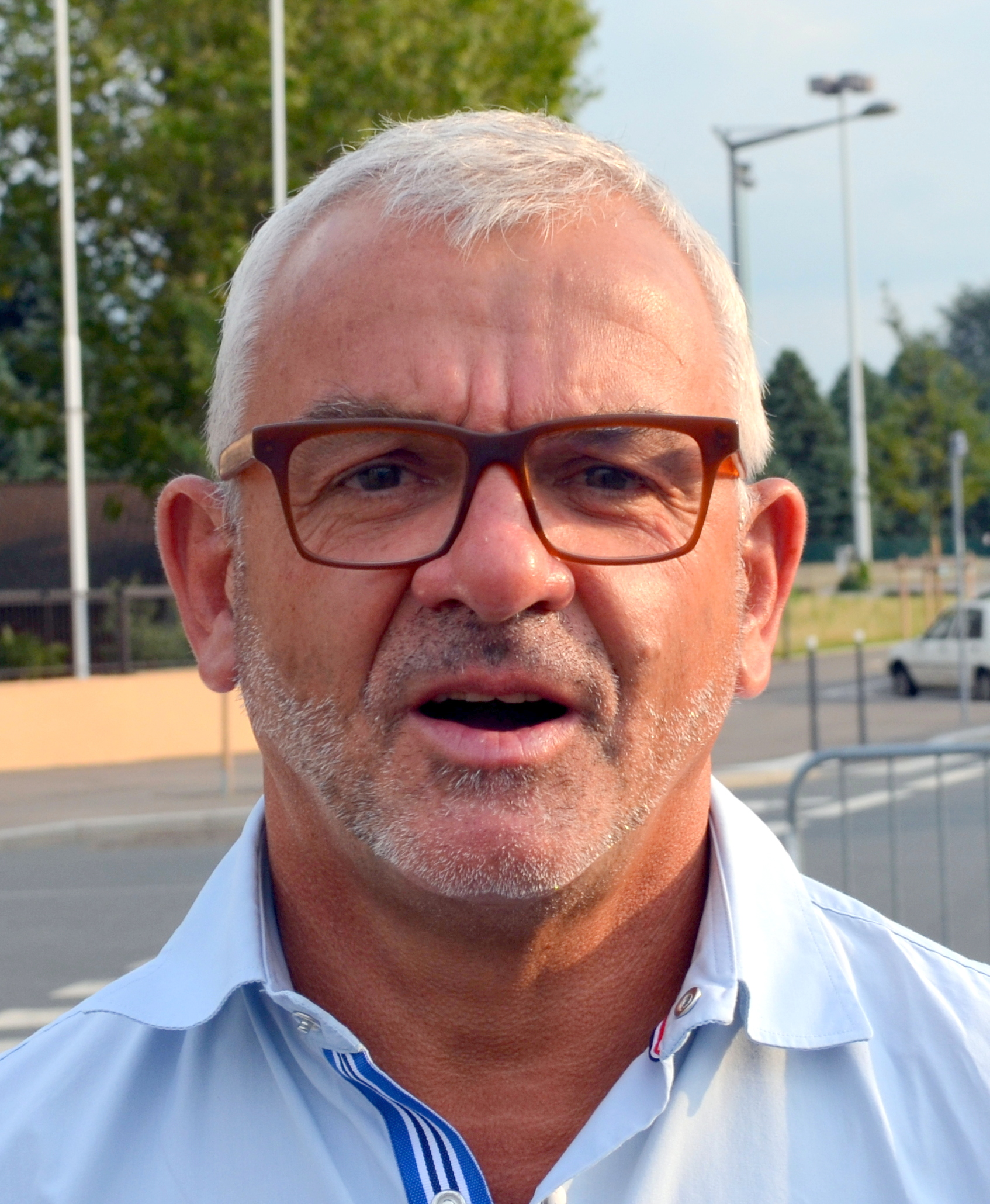
Footballer and coach Olivier Rouyer

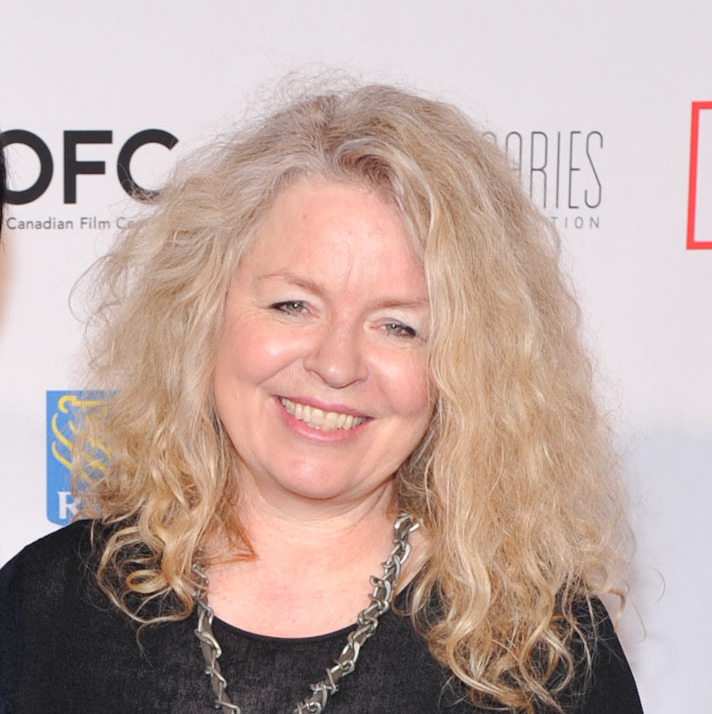
Filmmaker Patricia Rozema

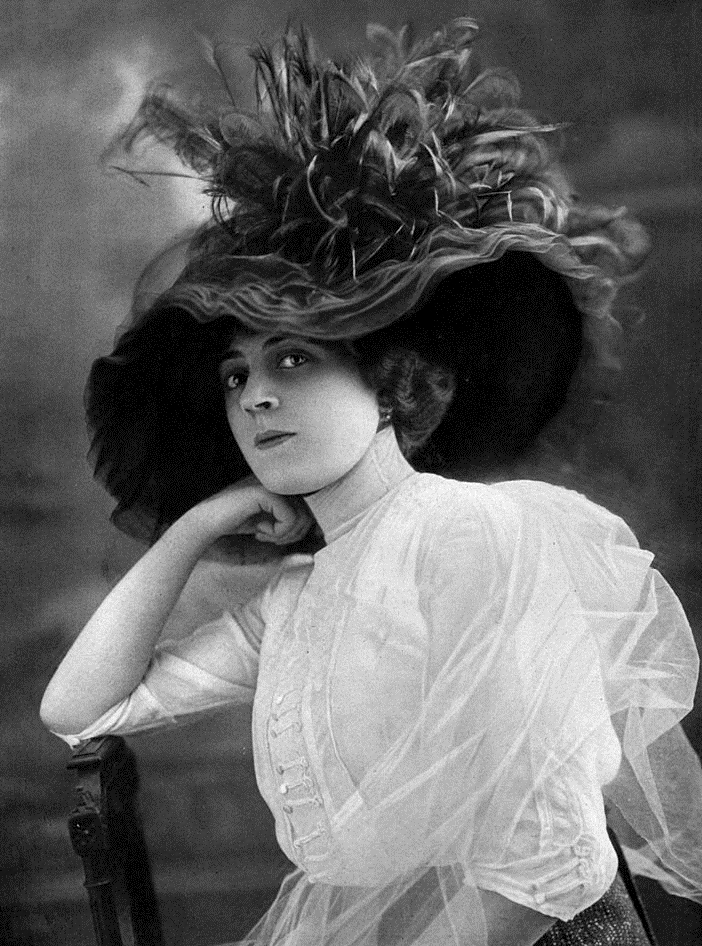
Dancer and actor Ida Rubenstein

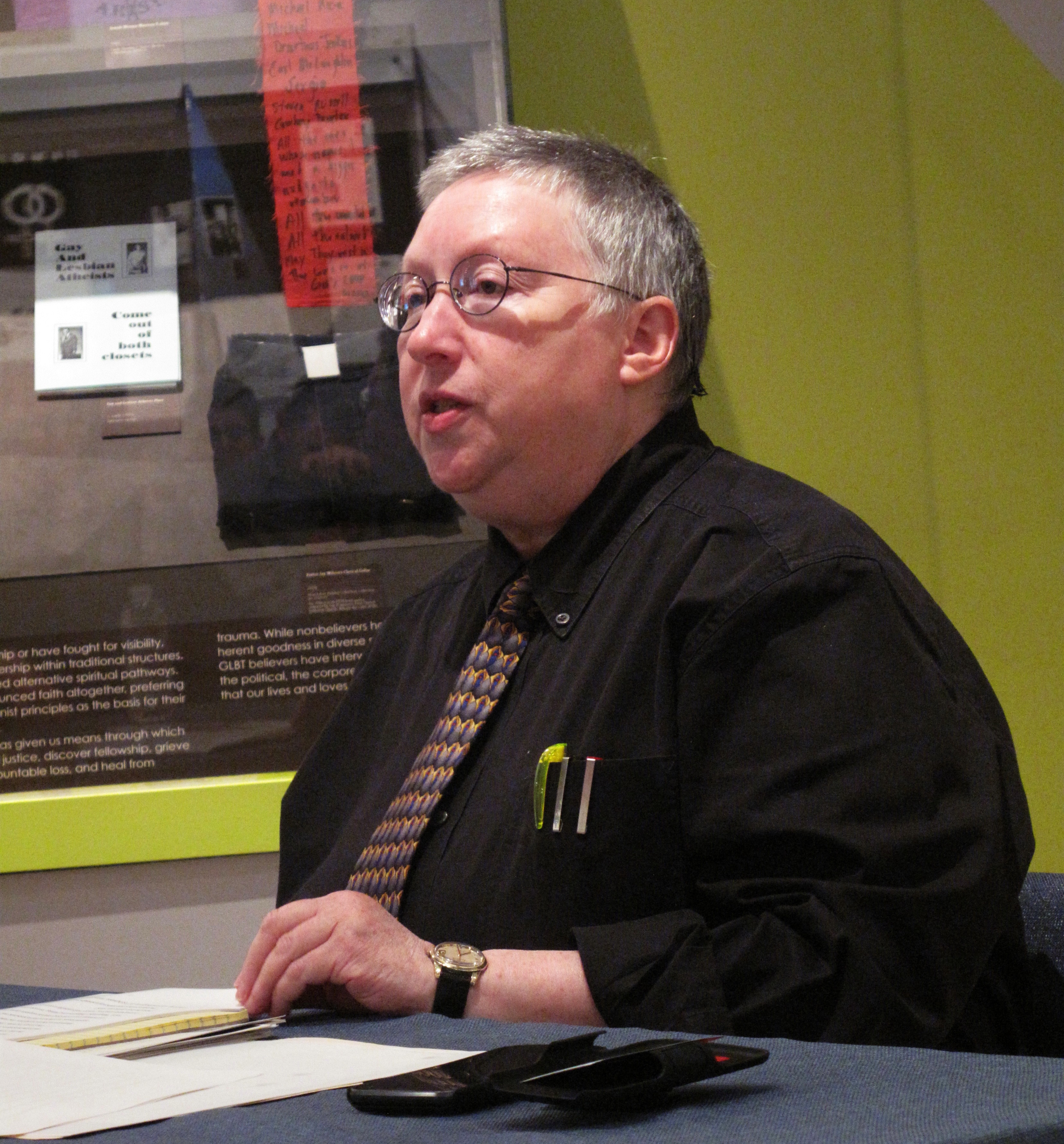
Cultural anthropologist Gayle Rubin

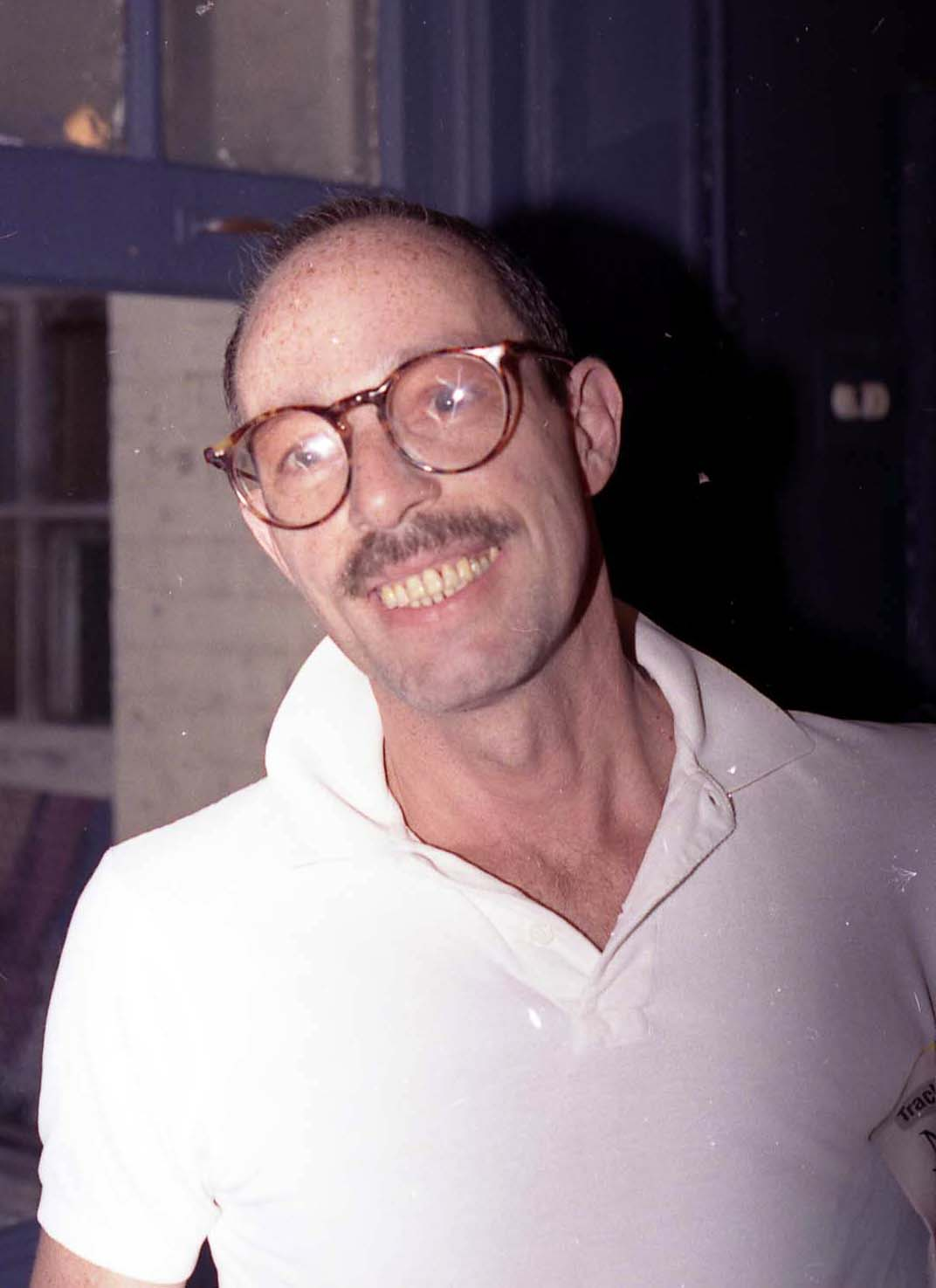
LGBT rights activist, film historian and author Vito Russo

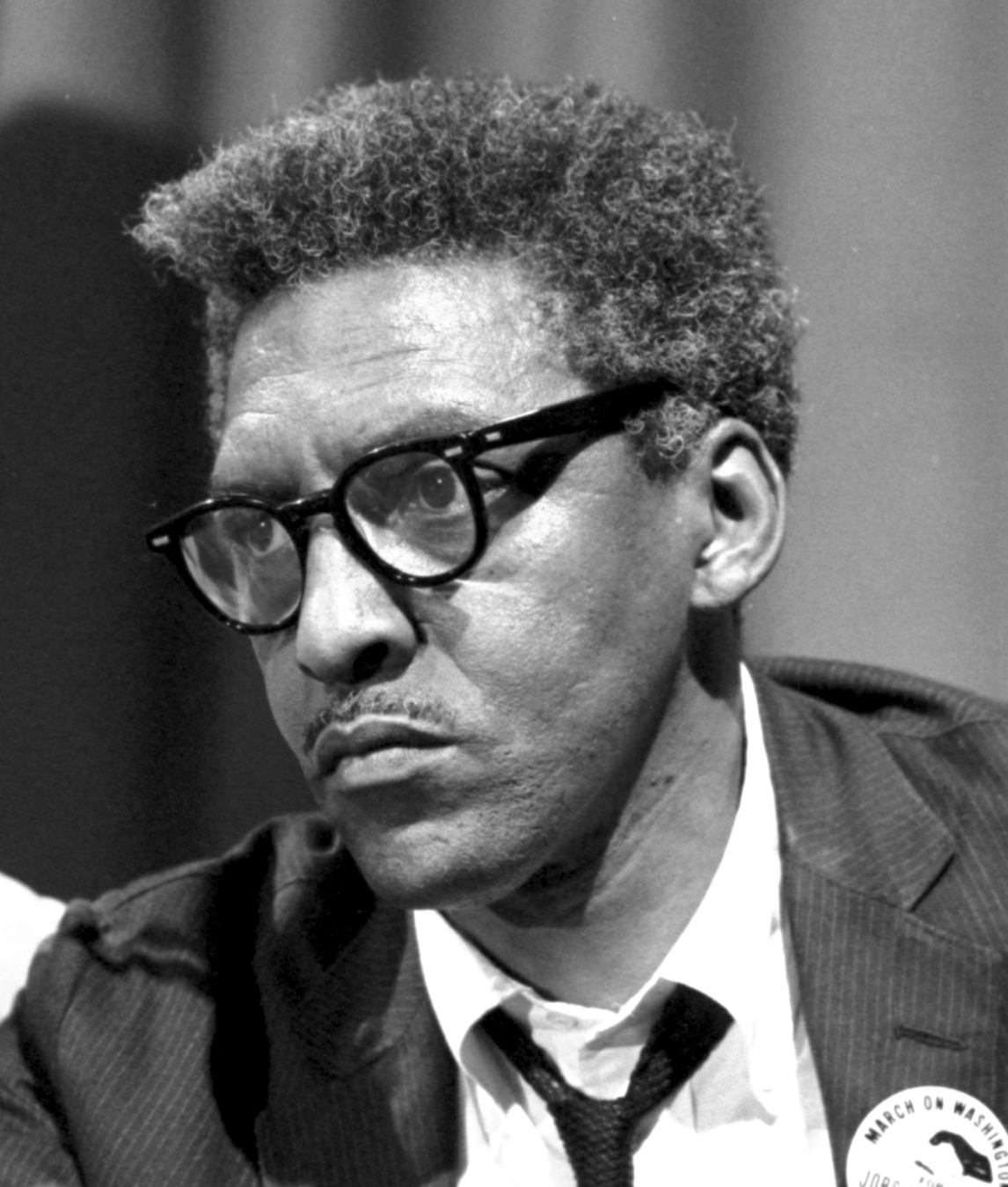
Civil rights activist Bayard Rustin

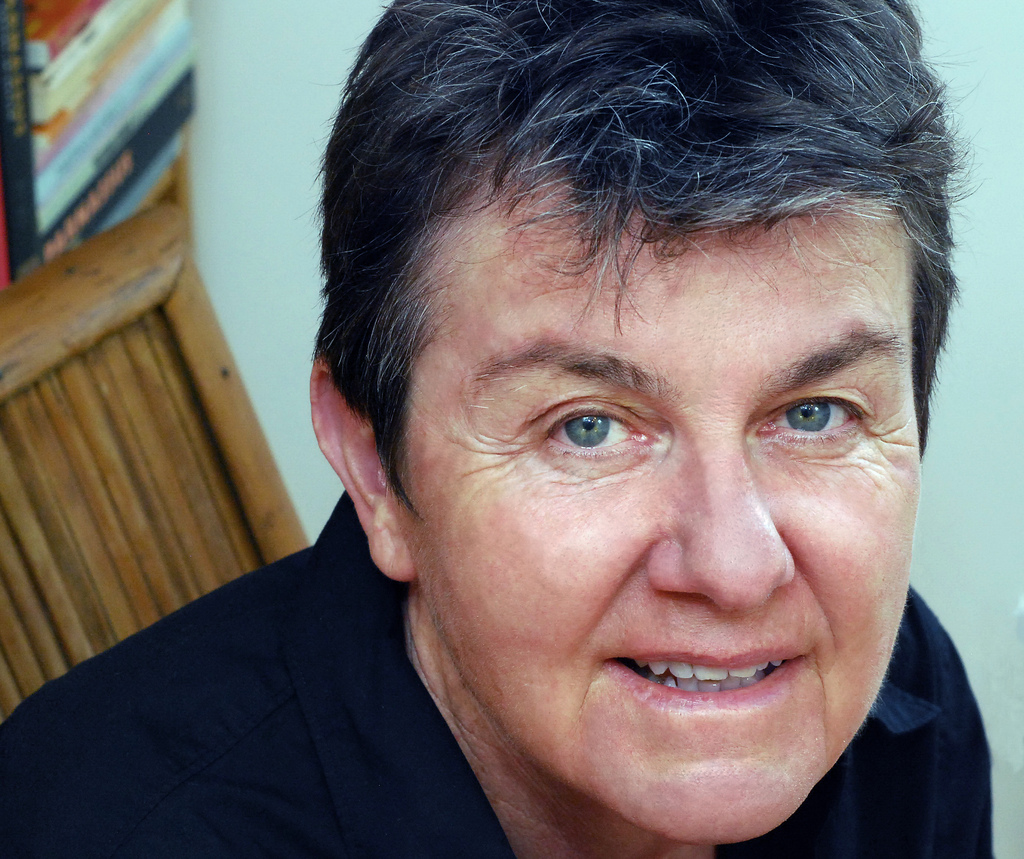
Poet Kay Ryan

Name	Lifetime	Nationality	Notable as	Notes
Armen Ra	b. 1969	Iranian-American	Thereminist, production designer, director, performer	G
Peer Raben	1940–2007	German	Composer	G
Keith Rabois	b. 1969	American	Technology entrepreneur, executive, investor	G
Patricia Racette	b. 1965	American	Opera singer	L
María Rachid	b. 1974	Argentine	Politician, LGBT rights activist	L
Radclyffe	b. 1950	American	Writer	L
Fritz J. Raddatz	1931–2015	German	Writer, biographer, literary critic	B
Johannes Radebe	b. 1987	South African	Dancer, choreographer	G
Eric Radford	b. 1985	Canadian	Figure skater	G
Anne-Imelda Radice	b. 1948	American	Art historian	L
James Rado	1932–2022	American	Actor, playwright, director, writer, composer	B
Friedrich Radszuweit	1876–1932	German	Publisher, writer	G
Jason Rae	b. 1986	American	Student	G
Kori Rae	b. ?	American	Film producer	L
Kyle Rae	b. 1954	Canadian	Politician	G
Gideon Raff	b. 1972	Israeli	Film director	G
Marc-André Raffalovich	1864–1934	French	Journalist, essayist, poet	G
Neil Rafferty	b. ?	American	Politician	G
Andrew Raftery	b. 1962	American	Painter	G
Luca Ragazzi	b. 1971	Italian	Film director, screenwriter	G
Gautam Raghavan	b. ?	American	Deputy Director of the Office of Presidential Personnel	G
Gerome Ragni	1935–1991	American	Actor, singer, songwriter, playwright	B
Amit Rahav	b. 1995	Israeli	Actor	G
Justin Raimondo	b. 1951	American	Writer	G
Randy Rainbow	b. 1981	American	Comedian, singer, YouTube personality	G
Yvonne Rainer	b. 1934	American	Dancer, choreographer, filmmaker	L
Ma Rainey	1882–1939	American	Blues musician	B
Traver Rains	b. 1977	American	Fashion designer	B
Matthew Rairdon	1991–2013	American	Nurse, murder victim	G
David Rakoff	1964–2012	American	Writer, actor	G
Ram Dass	1931–2019	American	Spiritual leader	B
Ahmad Danny Ramadan	b. 1984	Syrian-Canadian	Novelist, poet, public speaker, activist	G
Dack Rambo	1941–1994	American	Actor	B
Emilia Ramboldt	b. 1988	Swedish	Ice hockey player	L
Sara Ramirez	b. 1975	Mexican-American	Actor, singer, songwriter	B
Carlos Ramirez-Rosa	b. 1989	American	Politician	G
Juan Ramírez de Lucas	1917–2010	Spanish	Writer, journalist	G
Manuel Ramos Otero	1948–1990	Puerto Rican	Writer	G
Benny Nemerofsky Ramsay	b. 1973	Canadian	Artist	G
Emily Randall	b. ?	American	Politician	L
James Randi	1928–2020	Canadian-American	Magician, scientific skeptic	G
Vicki Randle	b. 1954	American	Pop/jazz musician	L
Sridhar Rangayan	b. 1962	Indian	Filmmaker	G
Axel Ranisch	b. 1983	German	Actor, director, writer	G
Jessica Rankin	b. 1971	Australian	Artist	L
Andrew Rannells	b. 1978	American	Actor	G
Al Rantel	b. 1955	American	Talk show host	G
R. Raj Rao	b. 1955	Indian	Writer, poet, LGBT rights activist	G
Nina Rapi	b. ?	Greek	Writer	L
Megan Rapinoe	b. 1985	American	Soccer player	L
Rachael Rapinoe	b. 1985	American	Soccer player	L
Anthony Rapp	b. 1971	American	Actor	B
Reneé Rapp	b. 2000	American	Actor, singer	L
Röbi Rapp	1930–2018	Swiss	Actor; He and Ernst Ostertag became the 1st gay couple to register a domestic partnership in Switzerland	G
Jim Rash	b. 1971	American	Actor, comedian, filmmaker	G
Ian Iqbal Rashid	b. 1965	Canadian-British	Poet, screenwriter, filmmaker	G
Eugenia Rasponi	1873–1958	Italian	Noblewoman, suffragist, businessperson	L
Ernst vom Rath	1909–1938	German	German diplomat, remembered for his assassination in Paris in 1938, which provided a pretext for the Kristallnacht.	G
Pongsak Rattanapong (aka Aof)	b. 1985	Thai	Singer, actor	G
Terence Rattigan	1911–1977	English	Playwright	G
Jonathan Rauch	b. 1960	American	Writer	G
Robert Rauschenberg	1925–2008	American	Artist	G
Øyvind Rauset	b. 1971	Norwegian	Rock musician, artist	G
Iris Rauskala	b. 1978	Finnish-Austrian	Civil servant, economist, politician	L
Arlene Raven	1944–2006	American	Art historian, writer	L
Mark Ravenhill	b. 1966	English	Playwright, actor	G
Yigal Ravid	b. 1957	Israeli	Journalist, radio and TV presenter	G
Yehudit Ravitz	b. 1956	Israeli	Singer-songwriter, composer, music producer	L
Amy Ray	b. 1964	American	Folk-rock musician (Indigo Girls)	L
Johnnie Ray	1927–1990	American	Pop musician	G
Nicholas Ray	1911–1979	American	Film director	B
Solomon Ray	b. ?	American	Recording artist, producer, DJ, singer-songwriter	G
Tamal Ray	b. 1985/1986	British	Baker, columnist, doctor	G
Javier Raya	b. 1991	Spanish	Figure skater	G
Raymix	b. 1991	Mexican	Musician, aerospace engineer	G
Gene Raymond	1908–1998	American	Actor	B
Lisa Raymond	b. 1973	American	Tennis player	L
Monica Raymund	b. 1986	American	Actor	B
Michele Rayner	b. 1981	American	Politician, civil rights attorney, social justice advocate	L
Toshi Reagon	b. 1964	American	Folk-rock musician	L
Peeter Rebane	b. 1973	Estonian	Film producer, director, entrepreneur	G
Ricky Rebel	b. 1980	American	Singer-songwriter, dancer, musician	B
John Rechy	b. 1934	American	Writer	G
Jeffrey Reddick	b. ?	American	Screenwriter	G
Riley Redgate	b. ?	American	Author	B
Michael Redgrave	1908–1985	English	Actor	B
Marius Redelinghuys	b. 1987	South African	Politician	G
Alfred Redl	1864–1913	Austrian	Military officer, spy	G
Joe Redner	b. 1940	American	Strip club owner	G
Tasya van Ree	b. 1976	American	Artist, photographer	L
Caitriona Reed	b. 1949	American	Zen sensei	B
Harris Reed	b. 1996	British–American	Fashion designer	G
Lou Reed	1942–2013	American	Musician, songwriter	B
Phil Reed	1949–2008	American	Politician	G
Robert Reed	1932–1992	American	Actor	G
Dee Rees	b. 1977	American	Film director, screenwriter	L
Roger Rees	1944–2015	Welsh	Actor, director	G
Cheryl Reeve	b. ?	American	Basketball coach	L
Kenneth Reeves	b. 1951	American	Mayor	G
Charles A. Reich	1928–2019	American	Writer, activist, legal scholar	G
Forrest Reid	1875–1948	Irish	Writer	G
Mandu Reid	b. 1981	Malawian-British	Current leader of the British Women's Equality Party	B
Melissa Reid	b. 1987	English	Golfer	L
Taylor Jenkins Reid	b. 1983	American	Author	B
Robert Reid-Pharr	b. ?	American	Literary/cultural critic, professor	G
Marko Reikop	b. 1969	Estonian	TV presenter	G
Charles Nelson Reilly	1931–2007	American	Actor	G
Sean Reinert	1971–2020	American	Musician, songwriter, drummer (Cynic, Æon Spoke)	G
Lili Reinhart	b. 1996	American	Actor	B
Christa Reinig	1926–2008	German	Writer, poet	L
Kali Reis	b. 1986	American	Boxer, actor	B
Toni Reis	b. 1964	Brazilian	Teacher, LGBT rights activist	G
João Lucas Reis da Silva	b. 2000	Brazilian	Tennis player	G
Rio Reiser	1950–1996	German	Rock musician (Ton Steine Scherben)	G
Jacob Reitan	b. 1982	American	LGBT rights activist	G
Jennifer Diane Reitz	b. 1959	American	Computer programmer, cartoonist, gender rights advocate	B
Mirkka Rekola	1931–2014	Finnish	Writer	L
Danton Remoto	b. 1963	Filipino	Writer, journalist, editor, columnist, educator	G
Mary Renault	1905–1983	English	Writer	L
Derek Rencher	1932–2014	British	Ballet dancer	G
Ludwig Renn	1889–1979	German	Writer, antifascist	G
Maria Ressa	b. 1963	Filipino-American	Journalist, Nobel Prize winner	L
Denise Restout	1915–2004	French	Musician	L
Glen Retief	b. ?	South African	Writer	G
Yolanda Retter	1947–2007	American	Librarian, archivist, scholar, activist	L
Paul Reubens	1952–2023	American	Actor (Pee-wee Herman), comedian	G
Gerard Reve	1923–2006	Dutch	Writer	G
Nina Revoyr	b. 1969	American	Author, children's advocate	L
Rex	b. ?	American	Artist, illustrator	G
Bebe Rexha	b. 1989	American	Singer-songwriter	B
Felix Rexhausen	1932–1992	German	Journalist, editor, author	G
Miguel Angel Reyes	b. 1964	American	Artist, professor of art, jazz and modern dancer	G
Feliciano Reyna	b. 1955	Venezuelan	Architect, AIDS activist	G
Hunter Reynolds	1959–2022	American	HIV activist, artist	G
Lady Rhea	b. ?	American	Writer	L
Stephen Rhodes	b. 1984	American	Stock car racing driver	G
Max Rhyser	b. 1982	Danish-American-Israeli	Actor, modeling	G
Øystein Rian	b. 1945	Norwegian	Historian	G
Conrad Ricamora	b. 1979	American	Actor	G
Jason Ricci	b. 1974	American	Blues musician	G
Christopher Rice	b. 1978	American	Writer	G
Dylan Rice	b. 1976	American	Singer-songwriter	G
Santino Rice	b. 1974	American	Fashion designer	G
Adrienne Rich	1929–2012	American	Poet	L
Little Richard	1932–2020	American	Singer-songwriter, musician	B
Maurice Richard	b. 1946	Canadian	Politician	G
J. August Richards	b. 1973	American	Actor	G
Anna Richardson	b. 1970	English	TV presenter, writer, journalist	B
Bill Richardson	b. 1955	Canadian	Writer, radio personality	G
Kieron Richardson	b. 1986	English	Actor	G
Sha'Carri Richardson	b. 2000	American	Sprinter	L
Tony Richardson	1928–1991	English	Film director	B
Helen Richardson-Walsh	b. 1981	English	Field hockey player	L
Kate Richardson-Walsh	b. 1980	English	Field hockey player	L
Richarlyson	b. 1982	Brazilian	Footballer	B
Jeffrey Richman	b. ?	American	Producer, writer, actor	G
Sviatoslav Richter	1915–1997	Russian	Classical musician	G
Charles Ricketts	1866–1931	English	Artist, writer	G
Igor Rickli	b. 1983	Brazilian	Actor	B
Sally Ride	1951–2012	American	Astronaut, first American woman in space, first openly LGBT astronaut	L
Keith Ridgway	b. 1965	Irish	Author	G
Eva Rieger	b. 1940	German	Musicologist	L
Rod Riffler	1907–1941	Croatian	Choreographer, Holocaust victim	G
Lynn Riggs	1899–1954	American	Playwright, poet	G
Marlon Riggs	1957–1994	American	Filmmaker	G
Cody Rigsby	b. 1987	American	Fitness instructor, dancer, TV personality	G
Greg Rikaart	b. 1977	American	Actor	G
Arthur Rimbaud	1854–1891	French	Poet	G
Robert Rinder	b. 1978	English	Barrister, television personality	G
Nils Johan Ringdal	1952–2008	Norwegian	Writer, historian	G
Edgars Rinkēvičs	b. 1973	Latvian	Politician, 11th President of Latvia, official	G
Laura del Rio	b. 1982	Spanish	Footballer	L
Pío del Río Hortega	1882–1945	Spanish	Neuroscientist	G
João do Rio	1881–1921	Brazilian	Writer	G
Ana Lucía Riojas Martínez	b. ?	Mexican	Politician	L
Cassandra Rios	1932–2002	Brazilian	Writer, novelist	L
Emily Rios	b. 1989	American	Actor	L
Frank Ripploh	1949–2002	German	Actor, film director, author	G
Mārtiņš Rītiņš	1949–2022	Latvian	Chef, TV presenter, businessman	G
Adam Rippon	b. 1989	American	Figure skater	G
Louise Ritter	b. 1958	American	Track and field athlete	L
Herb Ritts	1952–2002	American	Photographer	G
Marialy Rivas	b. ?	Chilean	Screenwriter, film director	L
Naike Rivelli	b. 1974	Italian	Actor	B
Bobby Rivers	1953–2023	American	Television personality	G
Harrison David Rivers	b. 1981	American	Playwright	G
Mawaan Rizwan	b. 1992	Pakistani-British	Actor, screenwriter, TV personality	G
Law Roach	b. ?	American	Stylist, TV personality	G
Mattea Roach	b. 1998	Canadian	Game show contestant, tutor	L
Chappell Roan	b. 1998	American	Singer	L
Jerome Robbins	1918–1998	American	Choreographer	G
Carolina de Robertis	b. 1975	Uruguayan-American	Author, teacher	L
Adele Roberts	b. 1979	British	Broadcaster, reality TV personality	L
Danny Roberts	b. 1977	American	Media personality	G
Hannah Roberts	b. 2001	American	Cyclist	L
Hig Roberts	b. 1991	American	Alpine skier	G
Ian Roberts	b. 1965	Australian	Rugby player	G
John Roberts	b. ?	American	Actor, comedian	G
Leslie Roberts	b. 1962	Canadian	News anchor	G
Rob Roberts	b. 1979	Welsh	Politician	G
Robin Roberts	b. 1960	American	News anchor	L
Thomas Roberts	b. 1972	American	News anchor, TV journalist	G
Grant Robertson	b. 1971	New Zealand	Politician	G
Ronald Robertson	1937–2000	American	Figure skater	G
Chloé Robichaud	b. 1988	Canadian	Filmmaker	L
Rubem Robierb	b. 1976	Brazilian	Visual artist, sculptor, photographer	G
David Robilliard	1952–1988	British	Poet, contemporary artist	G
Muriel Robin	b. 1955	French	Actor, comedian	L
Angela Robinson	b. 1971	American	Filmmaker	L
Beth Robinson	b. 1965	American	Justice of the Vermont Supreme Court	L
Frank M. Robinson	1926–2014	American	Writer	G
Gene Robinson	b. 1947	American	Bishop	G
Kelley Robinson	b. 1985/1986	American	Community organizer, President of the Human Rights Campaign	L
Svend Robinson	b. 1952	Canadian	Politician	G
Tom Robinson	b. 1950	English	Rock musician, DJ	B
Mo Rocca	b. 1969	American	Writer, comedian	G
Danni Roche	b. 1970	Australian	Field hockey player	L
Mazo de la Roche	1879–1961	Canadian	Writer	G
Bretman Rock	b. 1998	American	YouTube personality	G
Jeff Rock	b. 19??	Canadian	Metropolitan Community Church of Toronto pastor	G
Jamey Rodemeyer	1997–2011	American	Blogger, suicide victim	G
Robert Rodi	b. 1956	American	Writer	G
João Pedro Rodrigues	b. ?	Portuguese	Film director	G
Frankie A. Rodriguez	b. 1996?	American	Actor	G
Hena Rodríguez	1915–1997	Colombian	Sculptor	L
Jai Rodriguez	b. 1979	American	Reality show host, actor, cabaret musician	G
Juana María Rodríguez	b. ?	American	Professor, theorist	B
Michelle Rodriguez	b. 1978	American	Actor, screenwriter, DJ	B
Patricia Yurena Rodríguez	b. 1990	Spanish	Actor, model, beauty queen, and the 1st openly lesbian international beauty queen and Miss Spain	L
Richard Rodriguez	b. 1944	American	Writer	G
Vincent Rodriguez III	b. 1982	American	Actor	G
Ofelia Rodríguez Acosta	1902–1975	Cuban	Writer, journalist, feminist, activist	L
Elena Rodriguez-Falcon	b. 1972	Mexican	Chemical engineer, academic	L
Manuel Rodríguez Lozano	1896–1971	Mexican	Artist	B
Rafael Rodríguez Rapún	1912–1937	Spanish	Footballer, actor, soldier	G
Yamila Rodríguez	b. 1998	Argentine	Footballer	L
Craig Rodwell	1940–1993	American	Gay rights activist, organizer & writer.	G
Maria Rodziewiczówna	1863–1944	Polish	Writer, suffragist	L
John Roecker	b. 1966	American	Filmmaker	G
Ruth Margarete Roellig	1878–1969	German	Writer	L
Eric Rofes	1954–2006	American	Writer	G
Rosamaría Roffiel	b. 1945	Mexican	Writer, journalist, editor	L
Howard Roffman	b. 1955	American	Photographer, lawyer	G
Alan G. Rogers	1967–2008	American	Soldier, LGBT rights activist	G
Charles Rogers	b. 1987	American	Director, screenwriter, producer, actor	G
Gerry Rogers	b. 1964	Canadian	Filmmaker, actor, politician	L
Matt Rogers	b. 1990	American	Actor, podcaster, writer, comedian	G
Robbie Rogers	b. 1987	American	Footballer	G
Craig Rogerson	b. 1965	Australian	Diver	G
Ernst Röhm	1887–1934	German	Leading Nazi and Oberster SA-Führer	G
Jeff Rohrer	b. 1958	American	Football player	G
Yulimar Rojas	b. 1995	Venezuelan	Track and field athlete	L
Frederick Rolfe	1860–1913	English	Writer	G
Ron Romanovsky	b. ?	American	Musician (Romanovsky and Phillips)	G
Haris Romas	b. 1960	Greek	Actor, screenwriter, lyricist	G
Anthony Romero	b. 1965	American	Executive Director of the ACLU	G
Cesar Romero	1907–1994	American	Actor	G
Gabriel Romero	b. ?	Mexican	Actor	G
Jean-Luc Romero	b. 1959	French	Politician, writer	G
Steven Romo	b. 1987	American	Journalist	G
Frank Ronan	b. 1963	Irish	Novelist	G
Jim Rondeau	b. 1959	Canadian	Politician	G
Ugo Rondinone	b. 1964	Swiss	Visual artist	G
Trine Rønning	b. 1982	Norwegian	Footballer	L
Samantha Ronson	b. 1977	English	DJ	B
Paul Ronzheimer	b. 1985	German	Journalist	G
Jack Rooke	b. 1993	English	Comedian, writer	G
Don Roos	b. 1959	American	Filmmaker	G
Esther Roper	1868–1938	English	Suffragist	L
Horacio Roque Ramírez	1969–2015	Salvadoran-American	Historian	G
Ned Rorem	1923–2022	American	Contemporary classical composer, diarist	G
Hayden Rorke	1910–1987	American	Actor	G
Angela Ro Ro	b. 1949	Brazilian	Singer-songwriter	L
Will Roscoe	b. 1964	American	Writer	G
Calypso Rose	b. 1940	Tobagonian	Calypsonian; 1st female calypso star	L
Felipe Rose	b. 1954	American	Pop musician (Village People)	G
George Rose	1920–1988	English	Actor	G
Ruby Rose	b. 1986	Australian	Model, DJ, recording artist, actor, TV presenter	L
Sherman de Rose	b. ?	Sri Lankan	LGBT activist	G
Hilary Rosen	b. 1958	American	Recording industry leader, TV commentator	L
Lev A. C. Rosen	b. ?	American	Author	G
Mark Brennan Rosenberg	b. ?	American	Author, comedian	G
Stan Rosenberg	b. 1949	American	Politician	G
Bill Rosendahl	b. 1945	American	Politician	G
Paul Rosenfels	1909–1985	American	Social scientist	G
Paul Rosenthal	b. ?	American	Politician	G
Dora Rosetti	1908–1989	Greek	Gynecologist	B
Maer Roshan	b. ?	American	Writer	G
Golda Rosheuvel	b. 1970	Guyanese-British	Actor, singer	L
Ben Levi Ross	b. 1998	American	Actor	G
Grace Ross	b. 1961	American	Politician	L
Leone Ross	b. 1969	British-Jamaican	Novelist, short story writer, editor, journalist, academic	B
Robbie Ross	1869–1918	Canadian	Journalist, art critic	G
Shaun Ross	b. 1991	American	Model, actor, dancer	G
Sinclair Ross	1908–1996	Canadian	Banker, writer	G
Sal Rosselli	b. 1949	American	Labor leader	G
Markku Rossi	b. 1956	Finnish	Politician	G
Portia de Rossi	b. 1973	Australian	Actor, wife of Ellen DeGeneres	L
Martin Rossiter	b. 1970	Welsh	Rock musician (Gene)	G
Petra Rossner	b. 1966	German	Cyclist	L
Maurice Rostand	1891–1968	French	Poet, novelist, playwright	G
Gabriel Rotello	b. 1953	American	Writer, producer	G
Ernie Roth	1926–1983	American	Professional wrestling manager	G
Jim Roth	b. 1968	American	Politician	G
Jordan Roth	b. 1975	American	Theater producer	G
Rosely Roth	1959–1990	Brazilian	LGBT rights activist	L
Vanessa Rousso	b. 1983	American	Professional poker player	L
Olivier Rousteing	b. 1985	French	Fashion designer	G
Alma Routsong	1924–1996	American	Writer	L
Olivier Rouyer	b. 1955	French	Footballer	G
Lauren Rowles	b. 1998	English	Parasport rower, wheelchair athlete	L
A. L. Rowse	1903–1997	English	Historian, writer	G
Lesley Roy	b. 1986	Irish	Singer	L
Bert V. Royal	b. 1977	American	Screenwriter, playwright	G
Patricia Rozema	b. 1958	Canadian	Film director	L
Ruan Ji	210–263	Chinese	One of the Seven Sages of the Bamboo Grove	G
Steve Rubell	1943–1989	American	Co-owner of Studio 54	G
Bruce Joel Rubin	b. 1943	American	Screenwriter	G
Dave Rubin	b. 1976	American	Political commentator, YouTube personality, talk show host	G
Gayle Rubin	b. 1949	American	Cultural anthropologist	L
Ida Rubinstein	1883–1960	Russian	Actor, dancer	B
Ronen Rubinstein	b. 1993	Israeli-American	Actor, activist	B
Seth Rudetsky	b. ?	American	Writer, radio personality	G
Scott Rudin	b. 1958	American	Film producer	G
Paul Rudnick	b. 1957	American	Writer, screenwriter	G
Kathy Rudy	b. ?	American	Ethicist, writer	L
Kurt von Ruffin	1901–1996	German	Holocaust survivor	G
Adamo Ruggiero	b. 1986	Canadian	Actor	G
Deb Ruggiero	b. 1958	American	Politician, radio personality	L
Javier Ruisanchez	b. 1997	Puerto Rican	Swimmer	G
Mike Ruiz	b. 1964	American	Actor, film director	G
Pablo Ruiz	b. 1975	Argentine	Pop singer	G
Muriel Rukeyser	1913–1980	American	Poet, political activist	B
Jane Rule	b. 1931	Canadian	Author	L
Anna Rüling	1880–1953	German	Journalist, lesbian activist	L
RuPaul	b. 1960	American	Drag queen, actor, model, singer, TV personality	G
Michael Rupert	b. 1951	American	Actor	G
Imani Rupert-Gordon	b. 1979	American	Executive director of the National Center for Lesbian Rights (San Francisco, California)	L
Pacôme Rupin	b. 1985	French	Politician	G
Laurent Ruquier	b. 1963	French	Journalist, TV and radio host	G
Herbert Rusche	b. 1952	German	Politician	G
Joshua Rush	b. 2001	American	Actor	B
Stella Rush	1925–2015	American	Journalist, activist	L
Joanna Russ	1937-2011	American	Writer	L
Ada Dwyer Russell	1863–1952	American	Actor	L
Arthur Russell	1952–1992	American	Pop musician	G
Erick Russell	b. ?	American	Politician	G
P. Craig Russell	b. 1951	American	Comic artist	G
Ryan Russell	b. 1992	American	Football player	B
Lloyd Russell-Moyle	b. 1986	English	Politician	G
Albert Russo	b. 1943	Belgian	Writer	G
Giuni Russo	1951–2004	Italian	Singer-songwriter	L
Renato Russo	1960–1996	Brazilian	Rock musician (Legião Urbana)	B
Vito Russo	1946–1990	American	LGBT rights activist, cofounder of GLAAD, writer, film historian	G
Bayard Rustin	1912–1987	American	Civil rights activist	G
Elizabeth Ruth	b. 1968	Canadian	Writer	L
Nancy Ruth	b. 1942	Canadian	Politician	L
Paul Rutherford	b. 1959	English	Pop musician (Frankie Goes to Hollywood)	G
Ryan	b. 1978	Indonesian	Serial killer	G
Bill Ryan	b. 1955	Canadian	Professor	G
Kay Ryan	b. 1945	American	16th Poet Laureate of the United States	L
Lee Ryan	b. 1983	English	Singer–songwriter	B
Sara Ryan	b. 1971	American	Writer, librarian	B
John Rykener	fl. 1390s	English	Transvestite prostitute	G
Geoff Ryman	b. 1951	Canadian-English	Writer	G

== See also ==
- List of gay, lesbian or bisexual people
