= Bill Ryan =

Bill Ryan may refer to:

- Bill Ryan (journalist) (1926–1997), American broadcast journalist
- Bill Ryan (footballer, born 1944), former Australian rules footballer
- Bill Ryan (footballer, born 1914) (1914–1966), Australian rules footballer
- Bill Ryan (professor) (born 1955), Canadian professor of social work
- Bill Ryan (rugby league) (1911–1975), Australian rugby league player

== See also ==
- Billy Ryan (1887–1951), American football player
- William Ryan (disambiguation)
