= William Ryan =

William or Will Ryan may refer to:

== Arts and entertainment ==
- William Patrick Ryan (1867–1942), Irish poet, novelist, and journalist
- William F. J. Ryan (1903–1981), American designer
- Will Ryan (William F. Ryan, 1949–2021), American voice actor and singer

== Law and politics ==
- William Ryan (53rd Congress) (1840–1925), U.S. Representative from New York
- William H. Ryan (1860–1939), U.S. Representative from New York
- William Ryan (Canadian politician) (1887–1938), Canadian Member of Parliament
- William B. Ryan (1908-1975), American politician, lawyer, and judge
- William A. Ryan (1919–2001), American politician from Michigan
- William Ryan (Irish politician) (1921–1994), Irish Fianna Fáil politician
- William Fitts Ryan (1922–1972), American congressman from New York
- William H. Ryan Jr. (active since 1988), American lawyer, Delaware County District Attorney and acting Pennsylvania Attorney General

== Sports ==
- William Ryan (footballer) (active in 1890s), English professional goalkeeper
- William F. Ryan (1907–1954), American checkers player
- Will Ryan (basketball) (born 1978), American basketball coach
- Will Ryan (sailor) (born 1988), Australian sailor

== Others ==
- William D. Ryan (1861–1949), American labor unionist
- William Ryan (psychologist) (1923–2002), American psychologist

== See also ==
- Willie Ryan (disambiguation)
- Bill Ryan (disambiguation)
- Liam Ryan (disambiguation)
