= Willie Ryan =

Willie Ryan may refer to:

- Willie Ryan (Gaelic footballer), scorer of each of Tipperary's points in the 1895 All-Ireland Senior Football Championship final
- Willie Ryan (jockey) (born 1964), flat racing jockey from Ireland
- Willie Ryan (Limerick hurler) (1894–?), Irish hurler for Limerick
- Willie Ryan (rower) (born 1953), Irish Olympic rower
- Willie Ryan (Tipperary hurler) (born 1984), Irish hurler for Toomevara and Tipperary

== See also ==
- William Ryan (disambiguation)
