= Liam Ryan =

Liam Ryan may refer to:

- Liam Ryan (Dublin hurler) (born 1978), Dublin Senior hurler
- Liam Ryan (Limerick hurler) (1936–2015), Irish hurler
- Liam Ryan (Wexford hurler) (born 1995), Irish hurler
- Liam Ryan (footballer) (born 1996), Australian rules footballer

== See also ==
- William Ryan (disambiguation)
- List of people with given name Liam
