= Bill Ryan (footballer, born 1914) =

Australian rules footballer, born 1914

Personal information
- Full name: Bill Ryan
- Born: 27 July 1914
- Died: 1 July 1966 (aged 51)
- Original team: South Bendigo / Yarraville
- Height: 184 cm (6 ft 0 in)
- Weight: 78 kg (172 lb)

Playing career^{1}
| Years | Club | Games (Goals) |
| 1939–40 | Footscray | 26 (23) |
- ^{1} Playing statistics correct to the end of 1940.

Bill Ryan (27 July 1914 – 1 July 1966) was a former Australian rules footballer who played with Footscray in the Victorian Football League (VFL).
