= William Ryan (footballer) =

English footballer

Personal information
- Full name: William Ryan
- Place of birth: England
- Position: Goalkeeper

Senior career*
Years	Team	Apps	(Gls)
1892–1894	Burnley	1	(0)
1894–18xx	Padiham		
- * Club domestic league appearances and goals

William Ryan was an English professional footballer who played as a goalkeeper. He started his career with Football League First Division side Burnley, and made one appearance for the club in the 2–1 victory over Derby County at Turf Moor on 3 October 1892. He did not play again, but remained on the staff at Burnley until November 1894 when he left to join nearby Padiham.
