= Elena Rodriguez-Falcon =

Academic and engineer

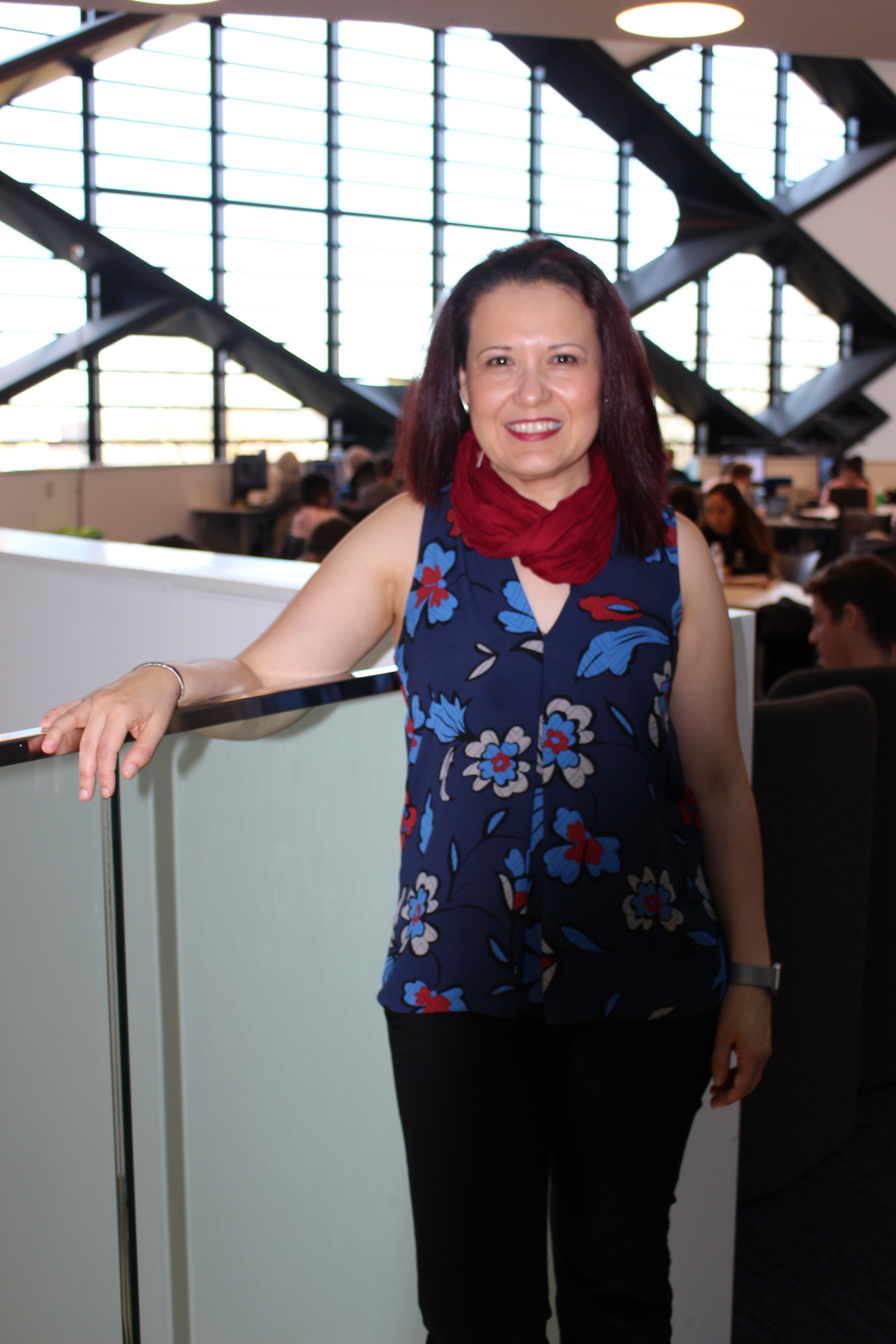
Rodriguez-Falcon in 2017

Elena Rodriguez-Falcon FREng PFHEA (born 1972) is a Mexican professor of engineering education. She is the Provost and Chief Academic Officer at Study Group.

Rodriguez-Falcon was Professor of Enterprise and Engineering Education at the University of Sheffield. In 2018, Rodriguez-Falcon was the Founding President and Chief Executive Officer at the New Model Institute for Technology and Engineering in Hereford. In 2022 she was appointed Deputy Vice Chancellor at the University of Wales Trinity Saint David.

== Early life and education ==
Rodriguez-Falcon was born in Monterrey, Nuevo Leon, Mexico, in 1972. She studied mechanical engineering at the Universidad Autónoma de Nuevo León in Mexico, graduating with a master's degree in 1994. From 1998 to 2000, Rodriguez-Falcon studied for an MBA in industrial management at Sheffield Hallam University.

== Career ==
Rodriguez-Falcon worked in industry in Mexico from 1993 as a design and logistics engineer and later as a project and quality manager. In 2002 she joined the University of Sheffield. She began her academic career teaching business planning to engineers in the Faculty of Engineering. Her students worked with clients to develop engineering solutions which could later become commercial products. She also studied cultural differences in workplace expectations among engineering students.

At Sheffield, Rodriguez-Falcon held several roles including director of enterprise education, and director of communications and external relations in the Faculty of Engineering. From 2011 to 2014, Rodriguez-Falcon was the director of Women in Engineering. In this role she wrote and spoke about the need for more women to become engineers and how this could be accomplished. For her work in the field, she was presented with a Women into Science and Engineering award in 2014.

In 2018, Rodriguez-Falcon left Sheffield to join the newly founded New Model Institute for Technology and Engineering in Hereford as founding president and chief executive officer, and distinguished chair in engineering education. In 2022, Rodriguez-Falcon was appointed Deputy Vice Chancellor at the University of Wales Trinity Saint David, and in 2023 she was appointed to the role of Provost and Chief Academic Officer at Study Group.

== Honours and awards ==
Rodriguez-Falcon was recognised by the Higher Education Academy as a Principal Fellow. The Royal Academy of Engineering recognised her for excellence in teaching in 2007, and she was named the most inspirational academic at the University of Sheffield. In 2015, she received an honorary doctorate of engineering from her alma mater, the Universidad Autónoma de Nuevo León. In 2019, she was selected as a fellow of the Institution of Engineering and Technology and by the Chartered Management Institute, and in 2020 Rodriguez-Falcon was named Woman of the Year in Technology by FDM Everywoman. In 2022, she was elected Fellow of the Royal Academy of Engineering for her work in engineering education.
