= Bill Ryan (professor) =

William James Ryan (born December 23, 1955, in Moncton, New Brunswick) is a professor of Social Work at McGill University in Montreal, Quebec, Canada. He is an international expert in the field of sexuality, sexual education, homophobia, health and gay men's health. He has conducted research in all these areas, published scientific articles, chapters and edited books. He has spoken at conferences internationally and consulted and trained with many international organizations. He is one of the leaders in the international gay men's health movement and has been a driving force behind the transformation of Action Séro-Zéro in Montréal into a full-fledged gay men's health organization. In 1992 he was the founding president of the Board of Directors of Séro-Zéro, which was founded to undertake HIV prevention among HIV negative gay men. He returned to the organization in 2000 and has once again been Chair, since 2004. He is the founder of the Canadian Safe Spaces movement, which, beginning with four sites (Halifax, Moncton, Montréal, Kamloops), has grown into a movement with dozens of supportive services for youth questioning their sexual orientation (see safe space). He was founding co-chair of the Canadian Rainbow Health Coalition. In 2006, the Canadian Institutes for Health Research, granted funding to a pan-Canadian team, SVR (Sexuality, Vulnerability and Resilience), of which he is co-chair, to study the impacts of homophobia on the health of gay, lesbian, bisexual, trans and two-spirit Canadians. In October 2009, he was named Personality of the Year by the Conseil Québécois des gais et lesbiennes, and in January 2010 he was awarded the Martin Luther King Junior Legacy Award by the City of Montréal. In 2011 he was named one of the Top Ten researchers in gender and health by the Gender and Health Institute of the Canadian Institutes of Health Research.

He is the fourth child of seven siblings.

Ryan is openly gay. He lives with his partner in Montreal and has an adopted son.

== Publications ==
- HIV/AIDS: The Canadian Experience, Oxford University Press, Toronto, 1998.
- Valuing Gay Men's Lives: Reinvigorating HIV Prevention in the Context of Our Health and Wellness
- Framing Gay Men's Health in a Population Health Discourse
- Ryan, B., Brotman, S. & Baradaran, A. (2008) The Color of Queer Health Care: Experiences of Multiple Oppression in the Lives of Queer People of Color In Canada In S. Brotman, J. Josy Levy & Chatrand, E. (eds.) Homosexualités : variations linguistiques et culturelles. Québec: Presses de l'Université du Québec, Coll. Santé et Société.
- Brotman, S., Ryan, B. Collins, S., Chamberland, L., Cormier, R., Julien, D., Meyer, E., Peterkin, A., Richard, B. (2007). Coming Out to Care?: Caregivers of Gay and Lesbian Seniors in Canada. The Gerontologist 47(4), 490–503.
- Ryan, B. & Julllien, D. (2007) Les couples de même sexe et la parentalité in L'Adoption L'état des lieux, St-André, M et M. Carignan (eds), Prisme (46), 214–236.
