= Ryan (given name) =

- Pronunciation: /ˈraɪən/ RY-ən
- Gender: Unisex (mostly male)
- Language: English (via Irish)

Origin
- Language: Irish
- Origin: Riaghan / Rian
- Meaning: Unknown
- Region of origin: Ireland

Other names
- Alternative spelling: Ryann; Rhyan; Ryen
- Related names: Ryland, Rylan

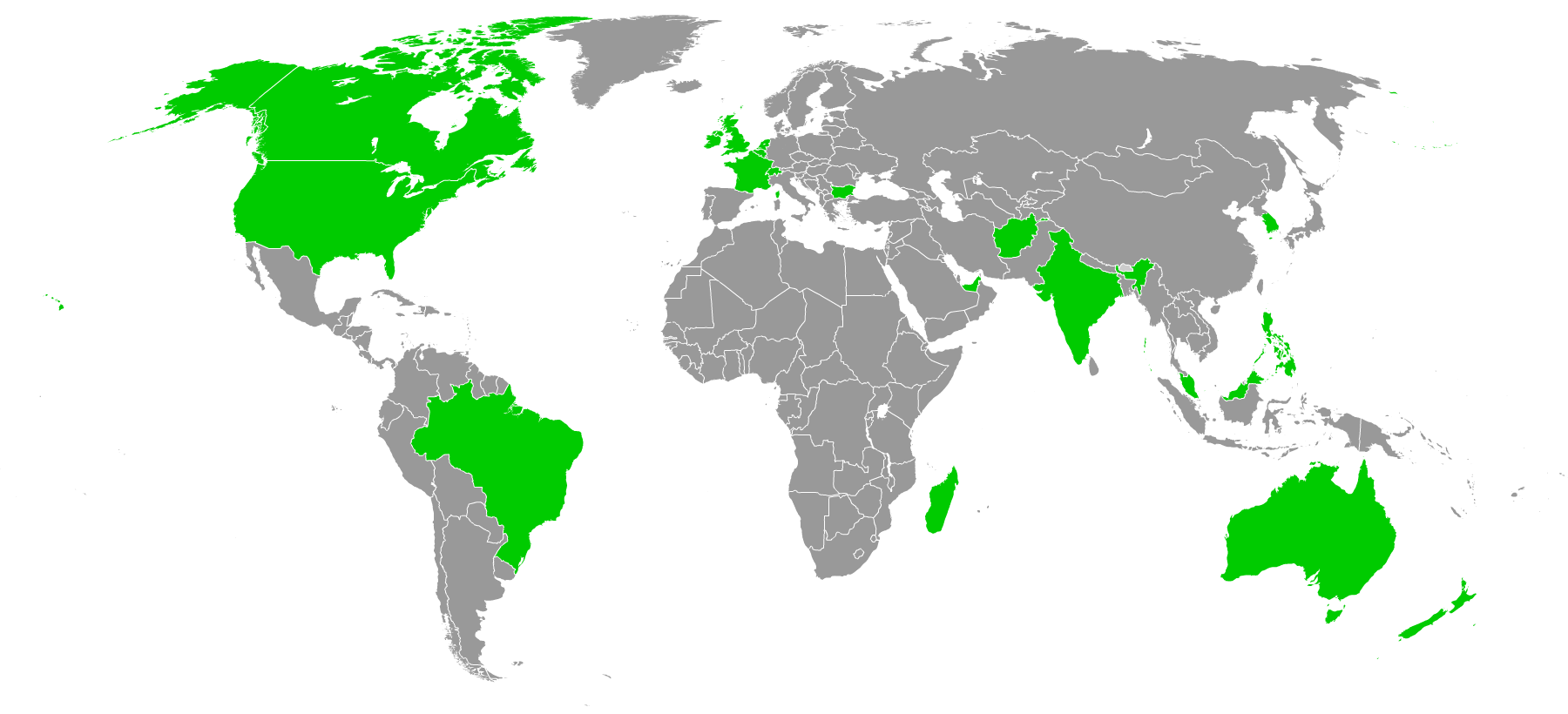
World map showing the countries where the name Ryan is among the 100 most popular names.

Ryan is an English-language given name of Irish origin. Traditionally a male name, it has been used increasingly for both boys and girls since the 1970s. It comes from the surname Ryan, which is typically an anglicisation of the Irish surname Ó Riaghain / Ó Riain (literally Ó "descendant" and Riaghain / Riain "of Riaghan / Rian"). Popular modern sources typically suggest that the name means "champion" and "little king", but the original meaning is unknown. According to John Ryan, Professor of Early and Medieval History at University College Dublin, "Rian, like Niall, seems to be so ancient that its meaning was lost before records began."

== Popularity ==
=== Ireland ===
From 1990 to 2026, the name Ryan had consistently ranked top 100 for newborn boys in Ireland, peaking in 2011 when it ranked as the 6th most popular name with 685 uses. By 2021, Ryan had been overtaken in popularity on the Irish charts by the Irish-language form Rian (/ˈriːən/ REE-ən) and its hyperforeign spelling variant Rían.

=== United Kingdom ===
In Scotland, "Ryan" was the most popular name given to newborn boys every year from 1994 to 1998. This increase in popularity is fairly recent as records show that "Ryan" was barely in use in 1900, then was later ranked between No. 100 and No. 250 in 1950, and finally climbed to No. 64 in 1975.

In Northern Ireland, "Ryan" did not appear in the top ten most common male names for newborns in 1975, but was in the top five from 2000 to 2003.

In England and Wales, records suggest less popularity for the name than in other parts of the UK, ranking at No. 21 in 2003 and 2004 before dropping to No. 25 from 2005 to 2007.

=== United States ===
"Ryan" appeared in the top 20 male given names in the U.S. for 30 years between 1976 and 2006, having previously appeared in the top 1,000 for the first time in 1946 before steadily gaining popularity over the next three decades. The name gained popularity for girls in the 1970s, having first appeared in this capacity in the top 1,000 in 1974, and has remained in the top 1,000 since then; in 2018, it was ranked at No. 364 on a list of the most popular girls' names.

== List of people with the given name Ryan ==
=== Male ===
- Ryan Adams (born 1974), American musician
- Ryan Adams (born 1993), American rapper
- Ryan Adeleye (born 1985), Israeli-American professional soccer defender who has played for Hapoel Ashkelon
- Ryan Agoncillo (born 1979), Filipino actor and TV personality
- Ryan Aguilar (born 1994), American baseball player
- Ryan Amador, American singer-songwriter and LGBT rights advocate
- Ryan Anderson (disambiguation), multiple people
- Ryan Anthony (1969–2020), American trumpet player
- Ryan Babel (born 1986), Dutch football player
- Ryan Bailey (disambiguation), multiple people
- Ryan Bang (born 1991), South Korean entertainer based in the Philippines
- Ryan Bastinac (born 1991), Australian rules footballer
- Ryan Bates (born 1997), American football player
- Ryan Battaglia (born 1992), Australian professional baseball player
- Ryan Bell (disambiguation), multiple people
- Ryan Benjamin (disambiguation), multiple people
- Ryan Bertrand (born 1989), English professional association football player
- Ryan Bethea (born 1967), American football player
- Ryan Binse (born 1984), American film producer
- Ryan Blaney (born 1993), American professional stock car racing driver
- Ryan Bollman (born 1972), American actor
- Ryan Borucki (born 1994), American baseball player
- Ryan Brasier (born 1987), American baseball player
- Ryan Braun (born 1983), American All-Star Major League Baseball player
- Ryan Briscoe (born 1981), Australian-American professional racing driver
- Ryan Broekhoff (born 1990), Australian basketballer
- Ryan Brooks (born 1988), American basketballer
- Ryan Burr (born 1978), American sports television journalist
- Ryan Burr (baseball) (born 1994), American baseball player
- Ryan Cabrera (born 1982), American pop rock singer and musician
- Ryan Campbell (disambiguation), multiple people
- Ryan Cartwright (born 1981), English actor
- Ryan Castellani (born 1996), American baseball player
- Ryan Cayabyab (born 1954), Filipino musician and composer
- Ryan Choi (fencer) (born 1997), Hong Kong fencer
- Ryan Choi (musician) (born 1984), composer and multi-instrumentalist
- Ryan Choo (born 1969/1970), Singaporean television actor
- Ryan Christenson (born 1974), American baseball player and coach
- Ryan Coll (born 2001), American football player
- Ryan Conbeer (born 1999), Welsh rugby union player
- Ryan Connelly (born 1995), American football player
- Ryan Coogler (born 1986), American director
- Ryan "Bump" Cooper Jr. (born 2001), American football player
- Ryan Coughlin (born 1973), Canadian football player
- Ryan Cusick (born 1999), American baseball player
- Ryan Dalziel (born 1982), British professional racing driver
- Ryan Davies (1937–1977), Welsh Entertainer
- Ryan Davies (cricketer) (born 1981), English cricketer
- Ryan Davis (disambiguation), multiple people
- Ryan de Villiers (born 1992), South African actor
- Ryan Dillon (born 1988), American puppeteer
- Ryan Donaldson (born 1991), English footballer
- Ryan Drummond (born 1973), American voice actor, actor, singer and comedian
- Ryan Dull (born 1989), American professional baseball player
- Ryan Dunn (1977–2011), American actor in TV show Jackass and stuntman
- Ryan Eckley (born 2004), American football player
- Ryan Edmondson (born 2001), English footballer
- Ryan Eggold (born 1984), American actor
- Ryan Eigenmann (born 1978), Filipino actor
- Ryan Esson (born 1980), Scottish goalkeeper
- Ryan Evans, basketball player
- Ryan Feltner (born 1996), American baseball player
- Ryan Finley (disambiguation), multiple people
- Ryan Fitzgerald (disambiguation), multiple people
- Ryan Fitzpatrick (born 1982), American football player
- Ryan Flaherty (born 1986), American baseball player and coach
- Ryan Flournoy (born 1999), American football player
- Ryan Ford (fighter) (born 1982), Canadian professional boxer
- Ryan Ford (footballer) (born 1978), English footballer
- Ryan Fox (disambiguation), multiple people
- Ryan Frazier, American basketball coach
- Ryan Fuller (born 1990), American baseball coach
- Ryan Fulton (born 1996), Scottish footballer
- Ryan Garcia (born 1998), American boxer
- Ryan Garcia (baseball) (born 1998), American baseball player
- Ryan Garner (born 1998), English professional boxer
- Ryan Getzlaf (born 1985), Canadian ice hockey player
- Ryan Giggs (born 1973), Welsh football manager and former player
- Ryan Glasgow (born 1993), American football player
- Ryan Gosling (born 1980), Canadian actor
- Ryan Hale (born 1975), American football player
- Ryan Hall (disambiguation), multiple people
- Ryan Harris (disambiguation), multiple people
- Ryan Harrison (disambiguation), multiple people
- Ryan Harwood (born 1991), Australian rules footballer
- Ryan Hayes (disambiguation), multiple people
- Ryan Helsley (born 1994), American baseball player
- Ryan Hendrix (born 1994), American baseball player
- Ryan Higa (born 1990), American YouTuber
- Ryan T. Higgins, American children's book author
- Ryan Howard (born 1979), American All Star Major League Baseball player
- Ryan Hunter-Reay (born 1979), American professional racing driver
- Ryan Izzo (born 1995), American football player
- Ryan Jastrab (born 2000), American para-cyclist
- Ryan Jeffers (born 1997), American baseball player
- Ryan Jimmo (1981–2016), Canadian mixed martial arts fighter
- Ryan Johnson (disambiguation), multiple people
- Ryan Jones (disambiguation), multiple people
- Ryan Kaji (born 2011), YouTuber, online personality, and owner of the children's YouTube Channel Ryan's World
- Ryan Kalil (born 1985), American football player
- Ryan Kalish (born 1988), American Major League Baseball player
- Ryan Kalkbrenner (born 2002), American basketball player
- Ryan Kelly (disambiguation), multiple people
- Ryan Kent (born 1996), English footballer
- Ryan Kerrigan (born 1988), American football player
- Ryan Kesler (born 1984), American ice hockey player
- Ryan Koltiska, American politician
- Ryan Kreidler (born 1997), American baseball player
- Ryan Kurnia (born 1996), Indonesian footballer
- Ryan Lavarnway (born 1987), American Major League Baseball player
- Ryan Leaf (born 1976), American football player
- Ryan Lee (disambiguation), multiple people
- Ryan Lester (born 1992), Australian rules footballer
- Ryan Lethlean (born 2002), Australian footballer
- Ryan Lewis (born 1988), American musician
- Ryan Lexer (born 1976), American-Israeli basketball player
- Ryan Lin (born 2008), Canadian ice hockey player
- Ryan Lochte (born 1984), American swimmer
- Ryan Longwell (born 1974), American football player
- Ryan Malone (born 1979), American ice hockey player
- Ryan Marks, American men's college basketball coach
- Ryan Martinez (fighter) (born 1987), American mixed martial artist
- Ryan Martinie (born 1975), American musician
- Ryan McCann (born 1981), Scottish footballer
- Ryan McCollum (born 1998), American football player
- Ryan McCurdy (born 1991), Northern Irish footballer
- Ryan McKenna (disambiguation), multiple people
- Ryan McMahon (disambiguation), multiple people
- Ryan Merlen (born 2002), French footballer
- Ryan Merriman (born 1983), American actor
- Ryan Millard (born 1987), Fiji international rugby league footballer
- Royce da 5'9" (born Ryan Daniel Montgomery in 1977), American rapper and songwriter
- Ryan Moore (disambiguation), multiple people
- Ryan Morgan (born 1990), Australian rugby league player
- Ryan Mountcastle (born 1997), American baseball player
- Ryan Nall (born 1995), American football player
- Ryan do Nascimento Ramos (born 1992), Brazilian footballer, known simply as Ryan
- Ryan Navarro (born 1994), American football player
- Ryan Neal (born 1995), American football player
- Ryan Neiswender (born 1994), American wheelchair basketball player
- Ryan Nelsen (born 1977), New Zealand footballer
- Ryan Newman (born 1977), American professional stock car racing driver
- Ryan Niblett (born 2004), American football player
- Ryan Nielsen (born 1979), American football coach
- Ryan Noda (born 1996), American professional baseball player
- Ryan Nugent-Hopkins (born 1993), Canadian ice hockey player
- Ryan Ochoa (born 1996), American actor
- Ryan O'Hearn (born 1993), American baseball player
- Ryan O'Malley (born 1980), American Major League Baseball player
- Ryan O'Malley (American football) (born 1993), American football player
- Ryan O'Nan (born 1982), American actor, writer, and director
- Ryan O'Neal (1941–2023), American actor
- Ryan O'Reilly (born 1991), Canadian ice hockey player
- Ryan Palmer, American professional golfer
- Ryan Pardey (born 1979), American musician, singer, songwriter and DJ
- Ryan Pepiot (born 1997), American baseball player
- Ryan Phillippe (born 1974), American actor
- Ryan Pickett (born 1979), American football player
- Ryan Pickett (filmmaker), American film director
- Ryan Pinney (born 1980), American Para-cyclist
- Ryan Ponti (born 1998), Malagasy footballer
- Ryan Potter (born 1995), American actor
- Ryan Powell (disambiguation), multiple people
- Ryan Preece (born 1990), American professional stock car racing driver
- Ryan Pressly (born 1988), American baseball player
- Ryan Ramczyk (born 1994), American football player
- Ryan Ramos (born 1985), Filipino actor, host and sportscaster
- Ryan Redington (born 1982), American dog musher and dog sled racer
- Ryan Reed (born 1993), American professional stock car racing driver
- Ryan Spencer Reed (born 1979), American social documentary photographer
- Ryan Reeves (born 1981), birth name of American professional wrestler Ryback Reeves
- Ryan Rehkow (born 1998), American football player
- Ryan Remington, American police officer who killed American disabled man Richard Lee Richards (1960–2021)
- Ryan Rems (born 1978), Filipino comedian and TV personality
- Ryan Reynolds (born 1976), Canadian-American actor
- Ryan Max Riley (born 1979), American World Cup skier and humorist
- Ryan Roberts (disambiguation), multiple people
- Ryan Ross (born 1986), American musician
- Ryan Rowland-Smith (born 1983), Australian baseball player
- Ryan Samsel, American arrested for his participation in the January 6 United States Capitol attack
- Ryan Seacrest (born 1974), American radio and television personality
- Ryan Searle (born 1989), Australian baseball player
- Ryan Sheckler (born 1989), American professional skateboarder
- Ryan Sherriff (born 1990), American Major League Baseball player
- Ryan Shields (born 1983), Jamaican sprinter from Chicago, Illinois
- Ryan Sieg (born 1987), American professional stock car racing driver
- Ryan Simpkins (rugby league) (born 1988), Australian Rugby League player
- Ryan Sitton (born 1975), Texas politician
- Ryan Skipper (1981–2007), American murder victim
- Ryan Slowik, American football coach (son of Bob Slowik)
- Ryan Smyth (born 1976), Canadian NHL ice hockey player
- Ryan Stanford, American politician
- Ryan Star (born 1978), American singer-songwriter
- Ryan Stiles (born 1959), American comedian
- Ryan Strain (born 1997), Australian footballer
- Ryan Suter (born 1985), American ice hockey player
- Ryan Switzer (born 1994), American football player
- Ryan Tafazolli (born 1991), English footballer
- Ryan Tannehill (born 1988), American football player
- Ryan Taylor (disambiguation), multiple people
- Ryan Teague (born 2002), Australian footballer
- Ryan Tedder (born 1979), American singer, songwriter, multi-instrumentalist and producer
- Ryan ten Doeschate (born 1980), Dutch cricketer
- Ryan Tepera (born 1987), American baseball player
- Ryan Thomas (born 1984), English actor
- Ryan Thompson (disambiguation), multiple people
- Ryan Trahan (born 1998), American YouTuber
- Ryan Truex (born 1992), American professional stock car racing driver
- Ryan Tubridy (born 1973), Irish broadcaster
- Ryan Turell (born 1999), American basketball player in the Israeli Basketball Premier League
- Ryan Van Dyke (born 1980), American football player
- Ryan Vail (born 1986), American long-distance runner
- Ryan Vilade (born 1999), American baseball player
- Ryan Walter (born 1958), Canadian professional ice hockey player
- Ryan Warsofsky (born 1987), American NHL ice hockey coach
- Ryan Waters, American mountaineer, guide, polar adventurer and speaker
- Ryan Watson (disambiguation), multiple people
- Ryan Weathers (born 1999), American baseball player
- Ryan Weber (born 1990), American baseball player
- Ryan Wedding (born 1981), Canadian snowboarder and drug lord
- Ryan Weiss (born 1996), American baseball player
- Ryan Wetnight (1970–2020), American football player
- Ryan Wheeler (born 1988), American Major League Baseball player
- Ryan White (1971–1990), American AIDS activist
- Ryan Williams (disambiguation), multiple people
- Ryan Wingo (born 2006), American football player
- Ryan Winslow (born 1994), American football player
- Ryan Yarbrough (born 1991), American baseball player
- Ryan Zeferjahn (born 1998), American baseball player

=== Female ===
- Ryan Kiera Armstrong (born 2010), American actress
- Ryan Michelle Bathe (born 1976), American actress
- Ryan Campbell (disambiguation), multiple people
- Ryan Carlyle (born 1989), American rugby sevens player
- Ryan N. Dennis, American curator and writer
- Ryan Destiny (born 1995), American singer and actress
- Ryan Feddersen (born 1984), American artist
- Ryan Gareis (born 1998), American professional soccer player
- Ryan Lai, Taiwanese comics author and illustrator
- Ryan Ashley Malarkey (born 1986/1987), American tattoo artist
- Ryan Newman (born 1998), American actress, singer, and model
- Ryan Playground, Canadian DJ artist and music producer
- Ryan Santiago (born 1994), American singer and songwriter
- Ryan Shamrock (born 1979), American professional wrestling valet
- Ryan Starr (born 1982), American singer and actress
- Ryan Torrero (born 1990), American-Chilean professional soccer goalkeeper and model
- Ryan Tyler (born 1973), American country music artist
- Ryan Williams (disambiguation), multiple people

=== Non-binary ===
- Ryan Ken (born 1991 or 1992), American writer, actor, and comedian
- Ryan Simpkins (born 1998), American actor
- Ryan A. Taylor (born 1984), American drag queen, television personality, and recording artist

== Fictional characters ==
- Ryan, a character from the horror comic series Witch Creek Road
- Ryan, a lion who is a popular figure of the Kakao Friends in South Korea
- Ryan, a purple tank locomotive in the British children's TV show Thomas & Friends
- Ryan, a non-playable Mii opponent in the Wii series
- Ryan Atwood, a troubled teenager on the television series The O.C.
- Ryan Chappelle, a government agent on the series 24
- Ryan Chess, a character in the 2016 American workplace teen comedy movie Hickey
- Ryan Choi, from DC
- Ryan Dougherty, a character in the 2023 movie American Outlaws
- Ryan Dunne, a baseball pitcher from Summer Catch
- Ryan Edwards, a character on Alvin and the Chipmunks: The Squeakquel
- Ryan Hardy, former FBI agent on The Following
- Ryan Howard (The Office), a character on The Office
- Ryan Laney, a racer from Cars 3
- Ryan Laserbeam, on True Jackson VP
- Ryan Lavery, a father on the American daytime drama All My Children
- Ryan Miller in the animated TV series The Loud House
- Ryan Mitchell, from Power Rangers Lightspeed Rescue
- Ryan O'Reily, an inmate on the prison drama Oz
- Ryan Sinclair, a companion of the Thirteenth Doctor in the series Doctor Who
- Ryan Spalding, a character in Grey's Anatomy, portrayed by Brandon Scott
- Ryan Steele, from VR Troopers
- Ryan Stone, an astronaut in the film Gravity
- Ryan Wilder, the second Batwoman in the Arrowverse
- Ryan Wolfe (CSI: Miami), from CSI: Miami
- Ryan Valmer, Jimmy Valmer's dad from South Park

== Other ==
- Ryan Meetup, a not-for-profit organization created by and run for people with the first name Ryan
- Murder of Ryan Poston, a 2012 crime perpetrated by Shayna Hubers in Kentucky
- Typhoon Ryan (1992), a Category 4 typhoon from August 30 to September 11
- ryan (hacker), a pseudonym of Finnish hacker and cybercriminal Aleksanteri Kivimäki

== See also ==
- List of Irish-language given names
- List of Scottish Gaelic given names
- Rayan (Persian given name)
- Rayan (disambiguation)
- Rhyan, given name and surname
