= Rian =

Rian is a given name related to Ryan, and also a surname. Notable people with the name include:

== Given name ==
- Rian Agung Saputro (born 1990), Indonesian badminton player
- Rian Dawson, drummer for American pop punk band All Time Low
- Rian Fernandez, Filipino fashion designer
- Rian Hughes, British graphic designer, illustrator, and comics artist
- Rian James (1899–1953), American screenwriter
- Rian Johnson (born 1973), American film director, writer, and producer
- Rian Lindell (born 1977), American National Football League placekicker
- Rian Malan (born 1954), South African author, journalist, and songwriter
- Rian Marques (born 1982), Brazilian footballer currently playing in Thailand
- Rian Sukmawan (born 1984), Indonesian professional badminton player
- Rian Wallace (born 1982), American former football player
- Rian (梨杏; born 2005), Japanese professional wrestler
- Rian, a fictional character from the television series The Dark Crystal: Age of Resistance and J.M. Lee's tie-in novels

== Surname ==
- Erlend Rian (1941–2020), Norwegian politician and newspaper editor
- Espen Rian (born 1981), Norwegian Nordic combined skier
- Johannes Rian (1891–1981), Norwegian painter
- Øystein Rian (born 1945), Norwegian historian, brother of Erlend Rian

== See also ==
- List of Irish-language given names
- Rianne, a feminine given name
- Rians (disambiguation), two places in France
