= Darren Burke =

University professor and entrepreneur

Darren Burke (born 25 April 1967) is a Canadian university professor, researcher and entrepreneur.

== Early life ==
Darren Burke was born in Halifax, Nova Scotia. He completed an undergraduate degree in Physical Education and a master's degree in Science from Dalhousie University. He was awarded a PhD in Exercise Physiology at the University of Saskatchewan in 2001 with the thesis "Individual creatine pool size and responsiveness associated with creatine supplementation".

== Career ==
In 2001, Burke started a tenure track role as an assistant professor at St. Francis Xavier University in 2001, and was promoted to associate professor with Tenure in 2004. In 2008, he left his academia career to start his first business. He applied his research to create a new line of sports nutrition products encompassing protein powders, energy capsules, and muscle-enhancing supplements tailored for professional athletes.

In 2013 his company, Rivalus was acquired by Nutrivo. In 2017, Burke started working on a sustainable technology to decrease food waste and conserve nutrients in fruits and vegetables which would have otherwise been discarded. In 2018, he partnered with former NHL hockey player TJ Galiardi to launch Outcast Foods which is a sustainable technology-based company aimed at upcycling discarded fruits and vegetables bound for landfills. He served as the CEO of Outcast Foods till the end of 2021.

In the same year he received the EY Entrepreneur of the Year for Atlantic Canada.

Burke returned to academia in 2023 as an Industry Professor at McMaster University to help the university set up a makerspace and develop a curriculum for Entrepreneurship and Innovation.
