= Brian Lee =

Brian Lee may refer to:

- Brian Lee (entrepreneur) (born 1971), American businessman
- Brian Lee (ice hockey, born 1984), American professional ice hockey player
- Brian Lee (ice hockey, born 1987), American professional ice hockey player
- Brian Lee (rugby league) (1941–1994), New Zealand rugby league player
- Brian Lee (soccer) (born 1971), British-born head coach of the Rice Owls women's soccer team
- Brian Lee (songwriter) (born c. 1981), American songwriter
- Brian Lee (public speaker) (born 1950), Canadian author, executive and speaker
- Brian Lee (wrestler) (born 1966), American professional wrestler
- Brian Lee (American football) (born 1975), American football player
- Brian Lee (football manager) (1936–2023), British football manager, coach, and administrator
- Brian North Lee (1936–2007), teacher and expert on bookplates

== See also ==
- Bryan Lee (1943–2020), American blues guitarist and singer
- Ryan Lee (disambiguation)
