= Ryan Johnston (disambiguation) =

Ryan Johnston (born 1992) is a Canadian ice hockey defenceman.

Ryan Johnston may also refer to:

- Ryan Johnston, Gaelic footballer for Kilcoo GAC
- Ryan Johnston, keyboardist in Hawaiian rock band, Goodbye Elliott
- Ryan Johnston, bass guitarist in Oregon folk-rock group, The Dimes
- Ryan Johnston, American actor and voice actor (see List of Grand Theft Auto characters)
- Ryan Johnston, co-designer of the Mondo spider

== See also ==
- Ryan Johnson (disambiguation)
