= Joe Feddersen =

Native American artist

- Born: Joe Feddersen; 1953 (age 72–73); Omak, Washington
- Education: University of Washington (BFA); University of Wisconsin–Madison (MFA)
- Known for: Mixed-media, painting, photography, sculpture, basketry, glass

Joe Feddersen (born 1953) is a Colville sculptor, painter, photographer and mixed-media artist. He is known for creating artworks strong in geometric patterns reflective of what is seen in the environment, landscape and his Native American heritage.

== Background ==
=== Early life and higher education ===
Joe Feddersen was born in Washington state to a German American father and an Okanagan/Sinixt mother.

He was first exposed to printmaking at Wenatchee Valley College under the direction of artist Robert Graves. Feddersen earned his Bachelor of Fine Arts in printmaking from the University of Washington in 1983 where he studied under artists Michael Spafford and Glen Alps. In 1989 he obtained his Masters of Fine Arts from the University of Wisconsin–Madison. Following his Masters he became an art instructor at The Evergreen State College.

=== Current life ===
When not creating art or teaching, Feddersen also serves as a writer, curator, consultant and active member of the Colville Confederated Tribal Arts & Humanities Board. He received, in 2001, an Eiteljorg Fellowship for Native American Fine Art award. In 2009 he left his teaching position at Evergreen State College and returned to Omak, Washington, his hometown. While occasionally teaching at Evergreen, he has been focusing on exploring the medium glass and has become involved with Pilchuck Glass School and the Museum of Glass. Feddersen's niece, Ryan Feddersen, is also an artist.

== Artistic career ==
=== Early work ===
My prints and mixed media work explore personal perceptions of my surroundings...Earlier prints become the departure for new work. They incorporate printing techniques and the addition of staples, pins, mirrors, oil pastels and acrylics o achieve a rich surface quality white retaining luminosity of previous layers. - 1987

Horses and Deer (2020) at the Renwick Gallery in Washington, DC in 2022

Feddersen's early creations involved photography and collage self-portraits in the early 1980s, reflecting on the individual and the environment surrounding self. However, his first major work was "Rainscape"; a series of lithographs that were exhibited at the Heard Museum's 3rd Biennial Native American Fine Art Invitational.

Through "Rainscape" Feddersen incorporated blended colors to form a rain-like landscape, reminiscent of the Pacific Northwest environment. This series launched Feddersen into the major contemporary art world; artists such as Jaune Quick-To-See Smith compared his use of color to Mark Rothko and Seattle Times art critic Deloris Tarzan Ament reflected on the woodblock works of Hiroshige when reviewing the works.

=== Printwork ===
In the early 1990s Feddersen created a series of monoprints based on blanket designs of the Plains Indians and Pendleton Woolen Mills. Heavy in geometry and layers and blended colors, the series were described by art scholar W. Jackson Rushing III as "watery veils of color", which brought out further comparisons to Rothko.

With the series "Plateau Geometrics" Feddersen continued to create prints during the latter half of the 1990s. All of the prints in the series are one of a kind (instead of an edition) and incorporate techniques such as etching, drypoint, aquatint, blind embossing and linocuts. The prints feature a pattern of geometric forms over a gridded layout; some are flat while others have a highly textured appearance. According to the artist the works represent his homesickness and memories of living on the reservation. At the time of creation he was living and working in Seattle, on the opposite side of the Cascade Mountains that serve to separate Colville country from Seattle. The geometric patterns represent designs seen in Colville basketry and cornhusk bags, while the complete series expresses Feddersen's desire to reflect on his communities traditional culture and his modern art background.

=== Sculpture and basketry ===
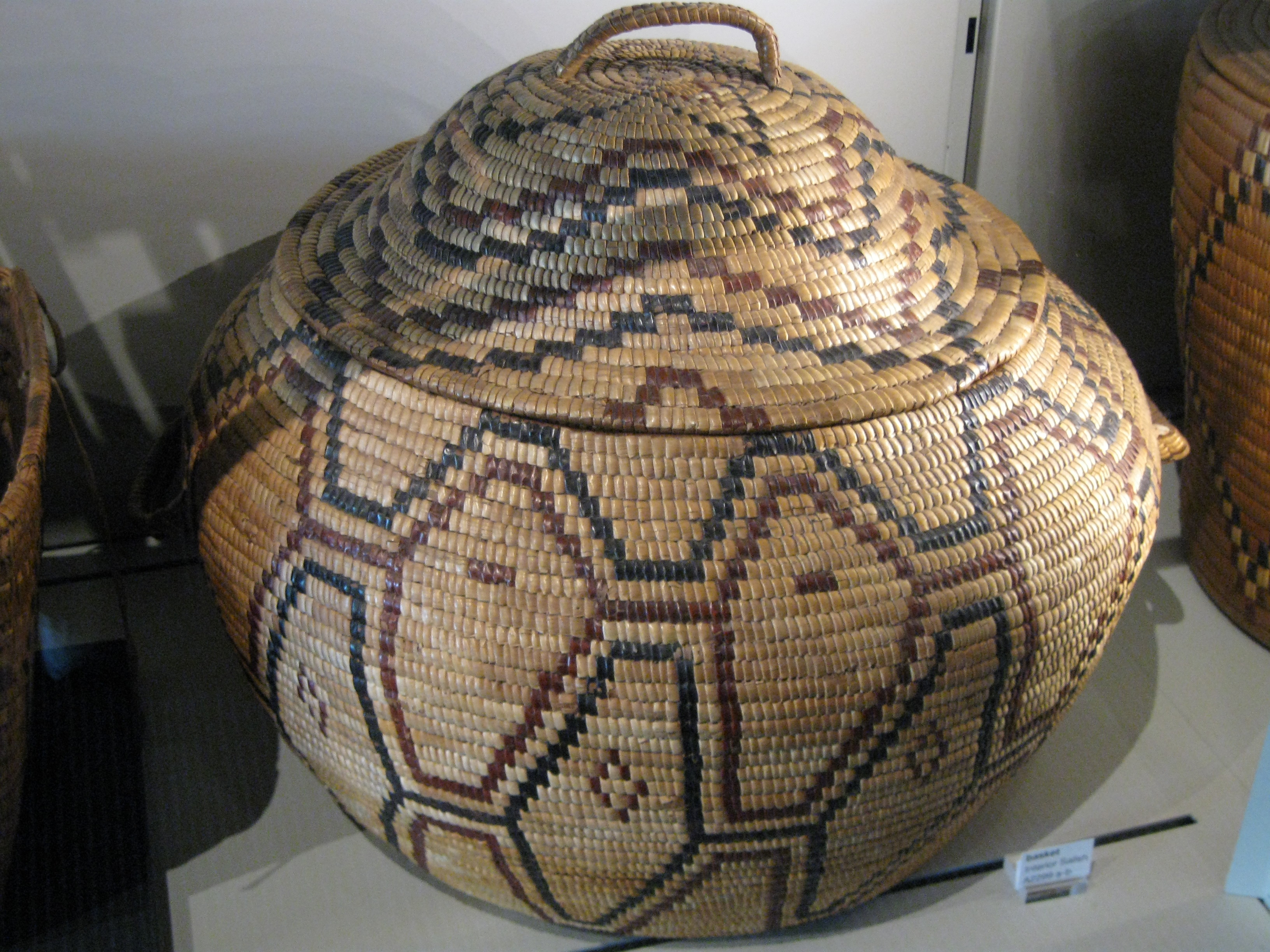
An Interior Salish basket with patterns similar to what Feddersen creates in his work.

Basketry entered into his catalog in the 2000s, learning Plateau-style techniques from poet and artist Elizabeth Woody. And recently his work has focused on glass making. Drawing influence from designs seen in Plateau Indian art, he creates artworks showing repeating patterns, leaving them with titles such as Cul-de-Sac, Scaffolding and Tire, a critique on contemporary life with a touch of tradition from Colville basketry.

== Major exhibitions ==
2023

- "Sharing Honors and Burdens: Renwick Invitational 2023", Renwick Gallery Smithsonian Institution. May 26, 2023 - March 31, 2024.

2010

- Across Cultures: Fifty Objects from the Macy Collection, Northern Arizona University
- Infinity of Nations, National Museum of the American Indian, New York.
- Joe Feddersen: Vital Signs, Hallie Ford Museum of Art

2008

- Joe Feddersen: Vital Signs, Missoula Art Museum

2006

- Made at the Museum: Northwest Selections, Museum of Glass

2005

- Art Objects, Portland International Airport
- Changing Hands 2: Art Without Reservation, Museum of Arts and Design
- Land Mark, Northwest Museum of Arts and Culture

2003

- Continuum, National Museum of the American Indian

2002

- Lasting Impressions, Cornell University

2001

- After the Storm, Eiteljorg Museum of American Indians and Western Art

1991

- Our Land/Ourselves, University at Albany, SUNY

1987

- 3rd Biennial Native American Fine Art Invitational, Heard Museum

1986

- New Directions/Northwest, Portland Art Museum

1984

- No Beads, No Trinkets, Palais des Nations

Feddersen's work has also shown in numerous private galleries as well as other public institutions such as the Whatcom Museum of History and Art, Simon Fraser University, Wheelwright Museum of the American Indian, Shoreline Community College, among others.

== Notable collections ==
- Eiteljorg Museum of American Indians and Western Art
- Hallie Ford Museum of Art
- Harborview Medical Center
- Heard Museum
- Johnson & Johnson Corporation
- Kaiser Sunnyside Medical Center
- Merrill Lynch
- Microsoft Corporation
- National Museum of the American Indian
- Northwest Museum of Arts and Culture
- Pacific Northwest Bell
- Peabody Essex Museum
- Portland Art Museum
- Seattle Art Museum
- Tacoma Art Museum
- University of Hawaii
- University of Western Sydney
- U.S. Department of the Interior
- U.S. Department of State
- Whitney Museum of American Art

His work is also seen in the collections of the cities of Portland, Seattle and Ephrata, Washington.

== Notable awards ==
- John H. Hauberg Fellowship, 2009, Pilchuck Glass School
- Eiteljorg Native American Fine Art Fellowship, 2001, Eiteljorg Museum
