= Rylan =

Rylan may refer to:

== People with the surname ==
- Dani Rylan (born 1987), American entrepreneur and former ice hockey player
- Emme Rylan (born 1980), American actress
- Jessica Rylan (born 1974), American sound artist, electronic musician and engineer

== People with the given name ==
- Rylan Bannon (born 1996), American baseball player
- Rylan Brownlie (born 2007), American soccer player
- Rylan Clark (born 1988), British television presenter and media personality
- Rylan Galiardi (born 1986), American-Canadian professional ice hockey player
- Rylan Hainje (born 1980), American basketball player
- Rylan Kissell (born 2002), American sport shooter
- Rylan Kleiter (born 1998), Canadian curler
- Rylan Reed (born 1981), former American football and baseball player
- Rylan Wiens (born 2002), Canadian diver

== Other uses ==
- "Rylan", a song on the 2019 album I Am Easy to Find by The National

== See also ==
- Ryland (disambiguation)
- Rylands
