= Ryan Feddersen =

American artist

Ryan Elizabeth Feddersen (stylized RYAN! Feddersen) (born 1984) is a Colville artist known for her interactive public art installations in the Pacific Northwest.

== Early life and education ==
Feddersen was born in 1984 and grew up in Wenatchee, Washington. She is an enrolled member of the Confederated Tribes of the Colville Reservation. Her uncle, Joe Feddersen, is an artist as well. Feddersen attended the Institute of American Indian Arts before transferring to Seattle's Cornish College of the Arts, graduating in 2009 with a Bachelor of Fine Arts.

== Career ==
Before becoming a full-time artist, Feddersen worked at the Tacoma Art Museum and 4Culture. One of Feddersen's first installations was "Coyote Now," an interactive piece that invites viewers to use crayons shaped like coyote bones to color the art themselves. Her piece "Kill the Indian, Save the Man" was displayed at Seattle's King Street Station in 2017. The artwork was a large map of the United States that, when rubbed by the viewer, displayed a list of Indian boarding schools.

In 2018, her work was displayed at the Museum of Northwest Art as part of their "In Red Ink" exhibit. A separate work of art, "The Post Human Archive," was displayed at the Seattle Art Museum that same year. The piece was an interactive installation where viewers uploaded photos of themselves to an online database. In 2019, a three-story mural created by Feddersen was installed at the Burke Museum of Natural History and Culture in Seattle.

Feddersen completed her first work of public art, "Nexus," in 2019. The piece was commissioned by the Washington State Historical Society and installed along the Prairie Line Trail in Tacoma. In 2021, she was contracted by Portland International Airport to create a work of art for one of the airport's concourses. The finished piece, "Inhabitance," consists of a series of panels that, depending on the angle, appear to show a landscape or an image of an eye. She returned to Tacoma in 2022 to construct "Mini-Tahoma," a representation of Mount Rainier's Tahoma Glacier constructed out of concrete and blue glass. That same year, Feddersen participated in Forest for the Trees, a major exhibition held alongside the Seattle Art Fair. She also painted a mural on the side of CitizenM's location in Pioneer Square.

In 2024, Feddersen constructed stained-glass windows for the Auburn Sounder station. The piece, titled "Companion Gardens," consisted of multiple brightly-colored windows with various plants displayed on them.
