= Aymond =

Canadian Thoroughbred racehorse

- Sire: Roselyon
- Grandsire: Sunstar
- Dam: Ablaze
- Damsire: Tony Bonero
- Sex: Gelding
- Foaled: 1927
- Country: Canada
- Colour: Bay
- Breeder: James Heffering
- Owner: Ryland H. New
- Trainer: Jack Hutton
- Record: 132: 20-?-?
- Earnings: Can$33,010

Major wins
- Canadian Classic Race wins: King's Plate (1930)

Aymond (foaled 1927 in Ontario) was a Canadian Thoroughbred racehorse best known for winning the 1930 King's Plate.

Bred by Whitby, Ontario's James Heffering, he was out of the mare, Ablaze, and sired by Roselyon, a son of the 1911 Epsom Derby winner and British Horseracing Hall of Fame inductee, Sunstar. Aymond was first purchased by Frank O'Connor who subsequently sold him in a 1929 dispersal for $1,025 to Toronto businessman Ryland New who had won the 1927 King's Plate with Troutlet.

Trained by Jack Hutton, Aymond's best result at age two was a third-place finish in the Coronation Futurity Stakes. At age three, he won the seventy-first running of the King's Plate, the most prestigious race in Canada. Sent off at 14:1 odds, eighteen-year-old jockey Henry Little aboard Aymond took the lead at the start and never relinquished it as he held off the heavy favorite Whale Bone to win the 1 1/8 mile event by a full-length.
