= Ryan Meetup =

Organized event

Ryan Meetup is a not-for-profit organization created by and run for people with the first name Ryan. It organizes frequent events in cities across the United States and Canada. According to the founders, the group intends to break the world record for the largest same‑name gathering.

== Origin ==
In 2023, photographer Ryan Rose of Brooklyn, New York was interested in forming a new group of friends. After trying several avenues, she hung up several posters in her neighborhood that read, "Is Your Name Ryan? Wanna Meet Other Ryans? Join The Ryan Meetup!" The posters contained a QR code with details of a meeting place and time.

Ryan Le and Ryan Cousins both saw the flyers and attended the first meeting. Rose, Le and Cousins became friends quickly and decided to begin forming Ryan Meetup, with the goal of someday breaking the world record for largest same-name gathering which currently is 2,325.

== Growth ==
- Since the original gathering of three Ryans in February 2023, Ryan Meetup has grown to more than 108,000 Instagram followers (as of June 2026) and received worldwide media coverage.
- The New York Times documented the first major New York City event in March 2023, which was held at a tavern named Ryan Maguire's.
- The Ryan Rave, held in Los Angeles, California, in September 2023, was attended by hundreds of Ryans from as far as the Philippines.
- In 2024, several Ryans attended a taping of the game show called The Price is Right, host Drew Carey acknowledged the organization.
- In 2025, ESPN SportsCenter devoted more than 7 minutes of coverage to the Ryan Meetup held at a Colorado Rockies game at Coors Field in Denver, Colorado.
- During the Rockies event, third baseman Ryan McMahon hit a 467-foot home run. Shortstop Ryan Ritter contributed two hits and relief pitcher Ryan Rolison also played in the game.

== Events ==
Official Ryan Meetup events are typically held at bars or taverns in a major North American city. There is typically no admission charge, with attendees only required to present official government identification that confirms their first name is Ryan. Persons with the middle name Ryan may also attend if they bring confirmation that they utilize Ryan as their preferred name. Persons with alternate spellings of Ryan such as Ryann, Ryen & Rion are also welcome.

At all events, Ryans receive "Hello, My Name is Ryan" nametags to wear.

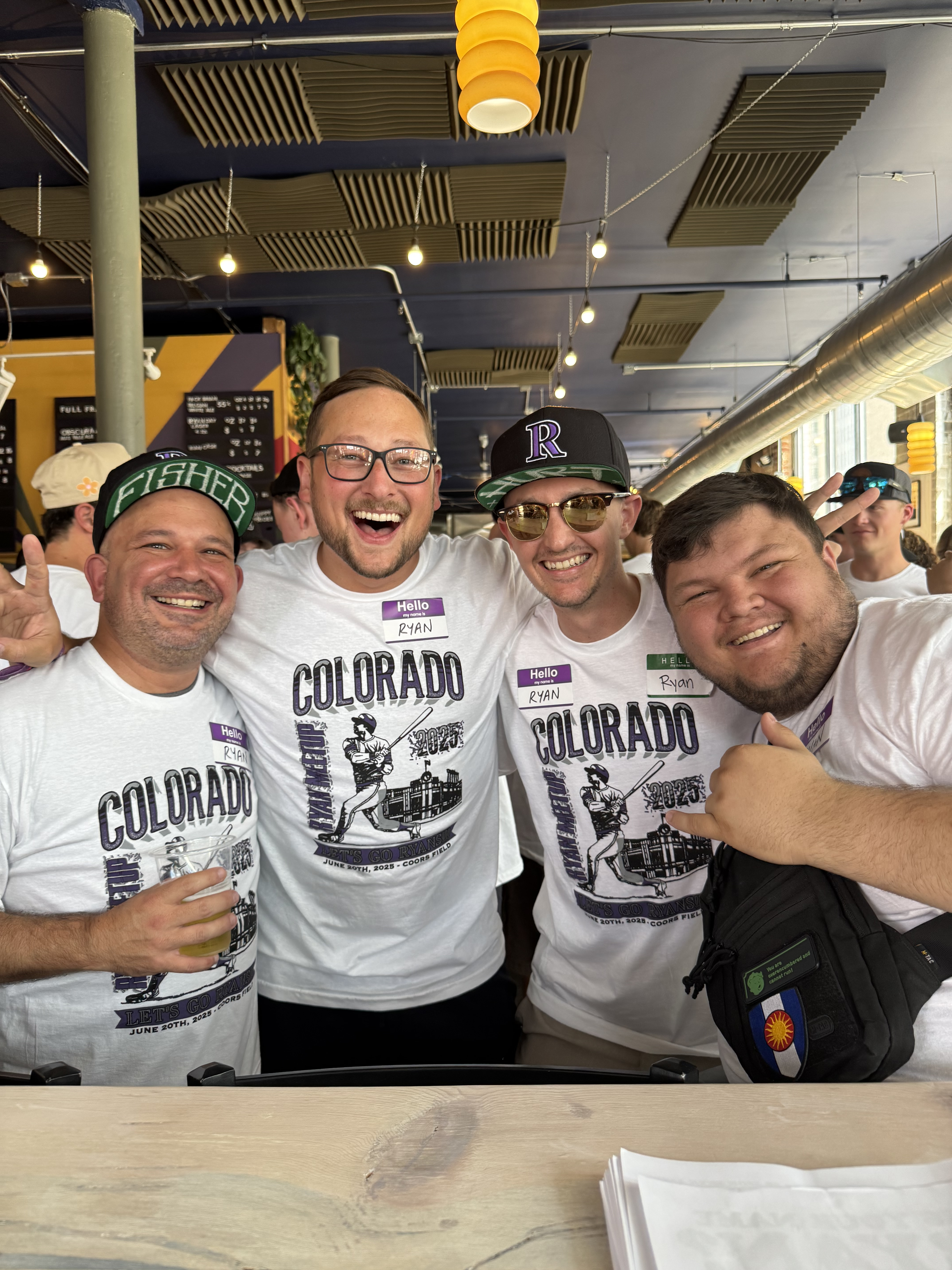
Ryans wearing Ryan nametags at a Ryan Meetup event

Official Ryan Meetups
Name	Date	Location
Ryan Kickoff	Thursday, February 9, 2023	Brooklyn, New York City
Ryan Roundup	Sunday, March 26, 2023	Manhattan, New York City
Ryan Rendezvous	Sunday, May 7, 2023	Brooklyn, New York City
Ryan Retreat	Sunday, July 23, 2023	Santa Monica, California
Ryan Rave	Saturday, September 2, 2023	Los Angeles, California
Rytoberfest	Saturday, October 21, 2023	Brooklyn, New York City
Photos With Ryan Claus	Sunday, December 10, 2023	Manhattan, New York City
Ryan Rodeo	Saturday, February 24, 2024	Austin, Texas
St. Ryan's Day	Saturday, March 23, 2024	Chicago, Illinois
Ryami Vice	Saturday, May 18, 2024	Miami, Florida
150 Deadpools & Wolverine	Saturday, July 27, 2024	Manhattan, New York City
Ryan Royale	Sunday, September 8, 2024	Toronto, Canada
Important Ryan Business	Sunday, October 13, 2024	Manhattan, New York City
Last Ryan Standing	Friday, January 24, 2025	San Diego, California
Ryan's Game Show	Saturday, January 25, 2025	San Diego, California
St. Ryan's Day II	Saturday, March 22, 2025	Boston, Massachusetts
Ryans @ Rockies	Friday, June 20, 2025	Denver, Colorado
Ryan Summit	Saturday, June 21, 2025	Denver, Colorado
Rytoberfest II	Saturday, September 13, 2025	Manhattan, New York City
Ryans Own Manhattan	Saturday, December 13, 2025	Manhattan, New York City
St. Ryan's Day III & The Ryan Steps	Saturday, March 21, 2026	Philadelphia, Pennsylvania
Copa del Ryan	Friday, June 26, 2026	Brooklyn, New York City
Ryde the Ryan Coaster	Friday, July 24, 2026	Bloomington, Minnesota
Ryan Baseball Classic	Saturday, July 25, 2026	Minneapolis, Minnesota
Welcome to Ryan	Sunday, July 26, 2026	Ryan, Iowa

== Impact ==
In September 2024, a two-month-old baby from Kenya named Ryan required life-saving surgery for hydrocephalus. Upon learning of the need for donations, the Ryan Meetup used its social media accounts to direct people named Ryan to a Watsi fundraising page.

The $719 needed was raised almost exclusively from people named Ryan within one hour of the Ryan Meetup outreach. Watsi said it was one of its fastest fundraising efforts ever completed.
