= Ryen (name) =

Ryen is a variety of the Irish/English given name Ryan and a Norwegian surname. Notable people with it include:

== Given name ==
- Ryen Jiba (born 2001), South Sudanese footballer
- Ryen Russillo (born 1975), American sports journalist
- Ryen Slegr (born 1979), American musician

== Surname ==
- Annar Ryen (1909–1985), Norwegian cross-country skier
- Anton Ryen (1894–1968), Norwegian politician
- Brit Vingelsgaard Ryen (born 1944), Norwegian politician
- Grethe Ryen (1949–2020), Norwegian actress
- Kai Olav Ryen (born 1978), Norwegian footballer
- Jan van Ryen (fl. 1620s–1630s), Dutch explorer
- Richard Ryen (1885–1965), Hungarian-American actor
- Tore Ryen (born 1946), Norwegian writer

== See also ==
- Ryen (name)
- Ryen, an Oslo neighbourhood
