= Rianne =

Rianne is a feminine given name which may refer to:

- Rianne Donders-de Leest (born 1960), Dutch politician
- Rianne Downey (born 2000), Scottish singer-songwriter
- Rianne Guichelaar (born 1983), Dutch water polo player
- Rianne ten Haken (born 1986), Dutch model
- Rianne Letschert (born 1976), Dutch professor of victimology
- Rianne Malixi (born 2007), Filipina amateur golfer
- Rianne Van Rompaey (born 1996), Dutch fashion model
- Rianne Sigmond (born 1984), Dutch rower
- Rianne de Vries (born 1990), Dutch short track speed skater

== See also ==
- Rian, a given name and surname
