= Rhyan =

Rhyan is a given name and surname. Notable people with the name include:

- Rhyan Grant (born 1991), Australian footballer
- Rhyan Mansell (born 2000), Australian rules footballer
- Rhyan White (born 2000), American swimmer
- Sean Rhyan (born 2000), American football player

== See also ==
- Ryan (given name)
- Ryan (surname)
