= Rayan =

- Gender: Both male and female
- Language: Persian and Arabic

Origin
- Meaning: Luxuriant, well-watered, satiated

Rayan (Persian: رایان, romanized: rāyān; Arabic: ريّان or ريان, romanized: rayyān), also spelt Rayyan, Rayyaan, Rayaan, Raian, Rayen, or Ryan is generally a male given name of Persian origin (and later) a male and female given name of Islamic/Arabic origin, meaning "luxuriant," "well-watered" or "satiated" in Arabic, while meaning "smart", "wise" or "thinker" in the Persian language.

In the later Islamic tradition, it is the name of one of the gates of Jannah, Al-Rayyan, through which only those who fast a lot would enter on the Day of Resurrection.

This name also has a meaning in Persian. Rayan (Persian: رایان, romanized: raːjaːn, Rāyān), also spelled Ryan, is an Iranian given name of Persian origin. It is primarily a male given name that means "smart", "wise" or "thinker".

According to the Israel Central Bureau of Statistics in 2010, Rayan is also one of the most common names among Arab Christians and Druze in Israel.

== Etymology ==
In Persian, the word Rāyān (رايان) appears in Francis Joseph Steingass's A Comprehensive Persian–English Dictionary (1892) as the plural form of rāy, glossed as "kings".

== Given name ==
- Rayan Aït-Nouri (born 2001), Algerian footballer
- Rayan Al-Boqami (born 1992), Saudi footballer
- Rayan al-Kildani (born 1989), Iraqi Assyrian politician
- Rayan Amiri, (born 1995), Iranian political activist
- Rayan Aribi (born 1987), Tunisian handball player
- Rayan Bamba (born 2004), French footballer
- Rayan Cherki (born 2003), French footballer
- Rayan El Azrak (born 1999), Dutch footballer
- Rayan Frikeche (born 1991), Moroccan footballer
- Rayan Helal (born 1999), French racing cyclist
- Rayan Kadima (born 1997), French footballer
- Rayan Khemais (born 1998), French footballer
- Rayan Lawrence, American actor
- Rayan Kahilan, Syrian academic
- Rayan Oram (born 2016 or 2017; died 2022), Moroccan child killed in well accident
- Rayyan Pathan (born 1991), Canadian cricketer
- Rayan Souici (born 1998), French footballer
- Rayan Yaslam (born 1994), Emirati footballer
- Rayyan Al-Ali (born 2006), Qatari footballer

== Surname ==
- Ahmed Yasser Rayyan (born 1998), Egyptian footballer
- Asma Al-Rayyan, Qatari royal and human rights activist
- Issa Rayyan (born 2000), American footballer
- Jamal Rayyan (1953–2026), Palestinian journalist and broadcaster
- Mohommed Rayyan (1955–1986), Iraqi fighter pilot
- Nizar Rayan (1959–2009), Hamas official
- Yasser Rayyan (born 1970), Egyptian footballer

== Mononymous names ==
- Rayan (footballer, born 1989), Brazilian footballer
- Rayan (footballer, born 2006), Brazilian footballer
