= Ryan Lee =

Ryan Lee may refer to:

- Ryan Lee (actor) (born 1996), American actor
- Ryan Lee (hedge fund manager), Korean American hedge fund manager and radio commentator
- Ryan Lee (Home and Away), a fictional character on the Australian soap opera Home and Away

== See also ==
- Brian Lee (disambiguation)
- Lee Ryan (born 1983), English singer-songwriter and member of the boy band Blue
