= Ryan Hall =

Ryan Hall may refer to:

== People ==
- Ryan Hall (fighter) (born 1985), American submission grappler and practitioner of Brazilian Jiu-Jitsu
- Ryan Hall (footballer) (born 1988), English footballer
- Ryan Hall (rugby league) (born 1987), English rugby league footballer
- Ryan Hall (runner) (born 1982), American long-distance track athlete and roadrunner
- Ryan Hall (soccer), American soccer player
- Ryan Hall, Y'all (born 1994), American YouTuber and Internet personality

== Other ==
- Ryan Hall (University of Notre Dame)
