= Ryan Thomson =

Ryan Thomson may refer to:

- Ryan Thomson (footballer, born 1982), Scottish former football player (Hajduk Split, Rot-Weiss Essen)
- Ryan Thomson (footballer, born 1991), Scottish football player (Stranraer)

== See also ==
- Ryan Thompson (disambiguation)
