= Ryland =

The name Ryland can refer to several things:

== Places ==
- Ryland, Alabama, United States
- Ryland, Lincolnshire, England
- Ryland, Hordaland, Norway
- Ryland Heights, Kentucky, USA

== People ==
- Ryland (surname)

=== Given name ===
- Sir Ryland Adkins (1862–1925), English lawyer, judge and politician
- Ryland Blackinton (born 1982), American musician and actor
- Ryland Bouchard (born 1979), American vocalist and musician
- Ryland Davies (1943–2023), Welsh operatic tenor
- Ryland Fletcher (1799–1885), American farmer, and politician
- Ryland James (born 1999), Canadian pop singer
- Ryland Milner (1909–1999), American football coach
- Ryland Moranz (born 1986), Canadian folk/roots singer-songwriter
- Ryland H. New (1888–1979), Canadian businessman and racehorse owner
- T. Ryland Sanford (1878–1952), first President of the Chatham Training School, Virginia
- Ryland Steen (born 1980), American drummer
- Ryland Dillard Tisdale (1894–1942), American naval officer

=== Fiction ===
- Dennis Ryland, character in American TV series The 4400
- Harris Ryland, character in American TV series Dallas
- Ryland Grace, character in sci-fi novel Project Hail Mary and its film adaptation

== Other ==
- CalAtlantic Homes, American home builder formerly known as Ryland Homes
- Ryland Automotive, Privately owned UK-based ultra-premium brand car dealer group representing most major specialist and luxury franchises

== See also ==
- Rylands
- Rylan (disambiguation)
