= Ryan Hayes =

Ryan Hayes may refer to:

- Ryan Hayes (ice hockey) (born 1989), American ice hockey player
- Ryan Hayes (American football) (born 2000), American football player
