= Ryan Campbell (disambiguation) =

Ryan Campbell (born 1972) is an Australian cricketer.

Ryan Campbell may also refer to:

- Ryan Campbell (lacrosse), Canadian lacrosse player
- Ryan Campbell (soccer) (born 2002), American soccer player
- Ryan Campbell (ice hockey, born 1979), ice hockey player for Braehead Clan
- Ryan Campbell (ice hockey, born 1970), ice hockey player for Guildford Flames
- Ryan Campbell, pilot who flew solo around the world in a Cirrus SR22

== See also ==
- Ryan Campbell-Gordon (born 2001), English footballer
