= TJ Galiardi =

Canadian-born American ice hockey player

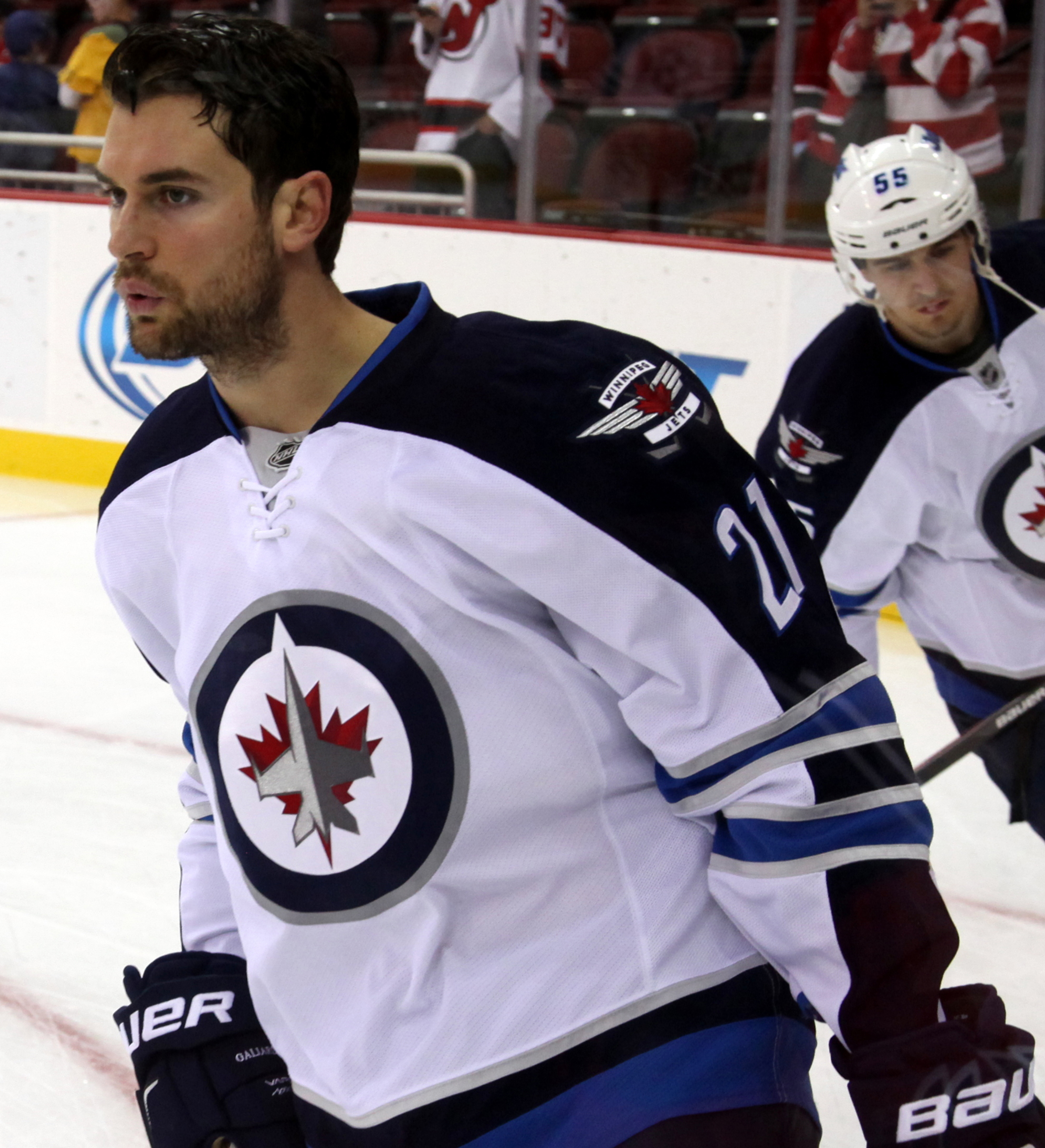
- Galiardi with the Winnipeg Jets in October 2014.
- Born: April 22, 1988 (age 38) Calgary, Alberta, Canada
- Height: 6 ft 2 in (188 cm)
- Weight: 195 lb (88 kg; 13 st 13 lb)
- Position: Centre
- Shot: Left
- Played for: Colorado Avalanche; San Jose Sharks; Calgary Flames; Winnipeg Jets; Malmö Redhawks; KHL Medveščak Zagreb; HC Neftekhimik Nizhnekamsk; Dinamo Riga
- National team: United States
- NHL draft: 55th overall, 2007; Colorado Avalanche
- Playing career: 2008–2018

Terry Joseph Galiardi, Jr. (born April 22, 1988) is a Canadian-born American former professional ice hockey forward. He most notably played in the National Hockey League (NHL) with the Colorado Avalanche, San Jose Sharks, Calgary Flames and Winnipeg Jets.

== Early life ==
Galiardi is the son of Terry and Lori Galiardi. He has two brothers, Rylan and Daniel. His mother is a United States citizen and Galiardi holds dual Canadian and U.S. citizenship. In international competition, Galiardi plays for the United States. He graduated from St. Mary's High School, in 2006.

== Playing career ==
Galiardi was drafted in the second round, 55th overall, in the 2007 NHL entry draft by the Colorado Avalanche. Galiardi played junior hockey with the Calgary Royals of the Alberta Junior Hockey League before he was selected by the Portland Winterhawks in the WHL Bantam Draft in 2006.

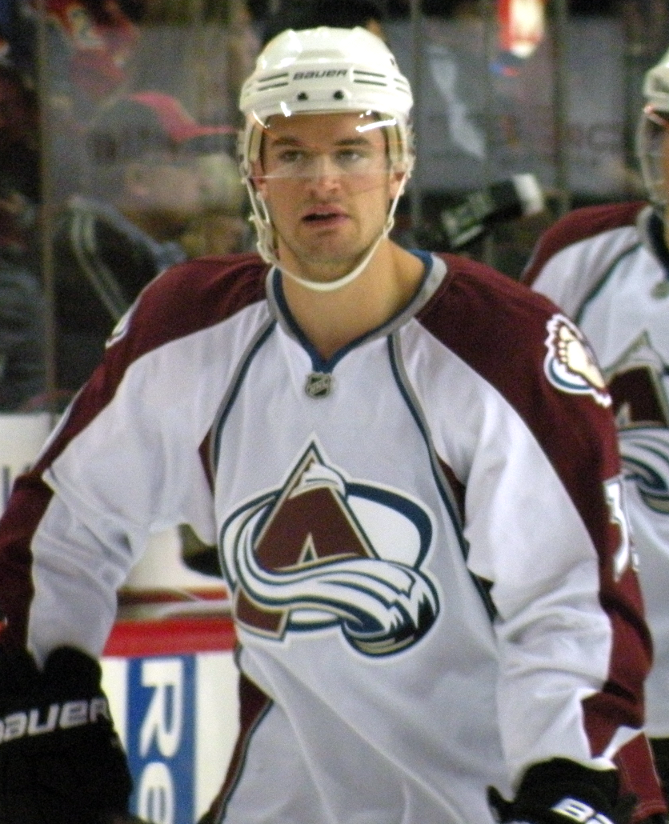
Galiardi as a member of the Colorado Avalanche in October 2009

Galiardi however opted to play collegiate hockey with Dartmouth College for the 2006–07 season. He finished the season with 31 points in 33 games for the Big Green, second to fellow Avalanche prospect David Jones. Galiardi left collegiate hockey to return to the Western Hockey League for the 2007–08 season. Upon his return the Calgary native had a homecoming of sorts when he was traded by the Winterhawks to the Calgary Hitmen for a 3rd round pick on August 30, 2007. Galiardi had a successful season with the Hitmen, placing second in the WHL among rookies, with 70 points, then leading the entire WHL in playoff scoring.

On May 13, 2008, Galiardi was signed by the Avalanche to a three-year entry-level contract. He made his professional debut with the Avalanche's affiliate, the Lake Erie Monsters of the AHL at the start of the 2008–09 season. On March 19, 2009, Galiardi received his first NHL recall. He made his NHL debut with the Avalanche the same day in an 8–1 loss against the Edmonton Oilers. Galiardi scored his first NHL goal on March 27, against Roberto Luongo of the Vancouver Canucks despite the team losing 4–1.

In the 2009–10 season, Galiardi made Colorado's opening night roster and established himself within the team as a versatile forward. After suffering an ankle injury in his first appearance in his birthplace of Calgary against the Calgary Flames, he returned to play in 70 games placing 6th in rookie scoring with 15 goals and 39 points. Leading the Avalanche forwards on the penalty kill he posted a team high 4 short-handed points, the most by any Colorado player since Peter Forsberg and Joe Sakic in 2000–01. Due to injury, Galiardi also found a role on the Avalanche top scoring line with Paul Stastny and Chris Stewart and posted a career high four assists in a 5–1 victory over the Columbus Blue Jackets on February 2, 2010. TJ made his playoff debut and in 6 games posted 2 assists as one of the Avalanche's most notable players in the Western Conference Quarterfinals defeat to the San Jose Sharks.

On July 12, 2011, Galiardi re-signed to a one-year contract with the Colorado Avalanche. In the 2011–12 season, Galiardi continued to struggle to recapture his rookie season form. On January 6, 2012, Galiardi recorded his first career Gordie Howe hat-trick in a 4–0 win over the Chicago Blackhawks by recording a goal on Blackhawks' goaltender Corey Crawford, an assist on a goal by David Jones and participated in his first career fight against Blackhawks' forward Dave Bolland.

Towards the end of the 2011–12 season, on February 27, 2012 at the trade deadline, Galiardi was traded by the Avalanche, along with Daniel Winnik and a seventh-round pick, to the San Jose Sharks in exchange for Jamie McGinn and prospects Mike Connolly, Michael Sgarbossa. Galiardi struggled to immediately make an impact with the Sharks, demoted as a healthy scratch on occasion while scoring a goal in 14 games.

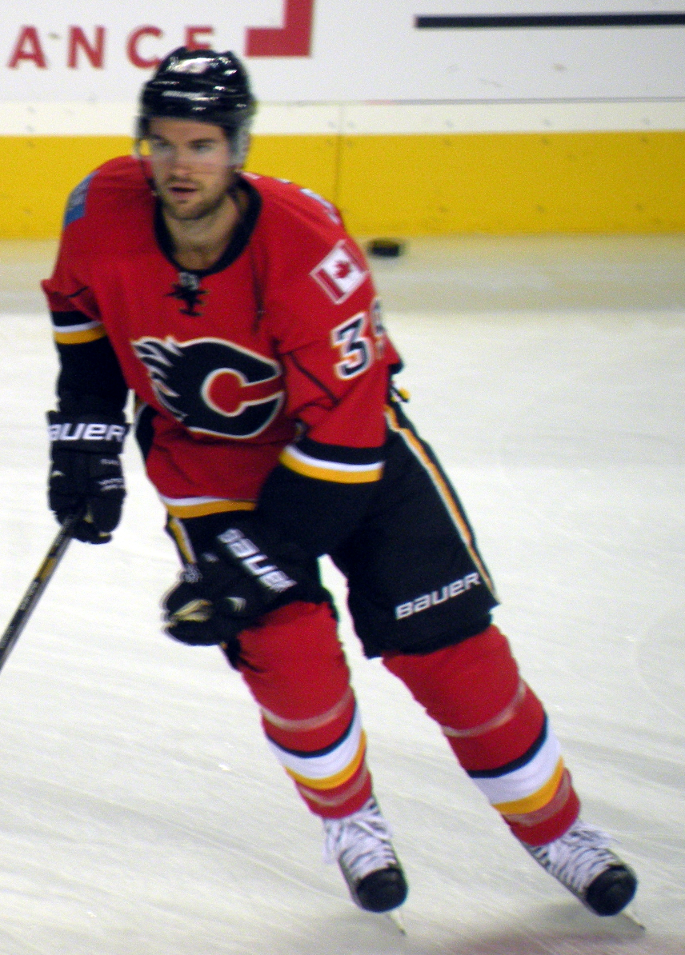
Galiardi with the Calgary Flames in October 2013.

As a restricted free agent at season end, Galiardi initially opted to take the Sharks to salary arbitration before agreeing to a one-year extension on July 9, 2012. With the 2012 NHL lockout in effect and in order to keep in shape, Galiardi signed his first European contract with German second division club, SC Bietigheim Steelers on October 3, 2012. Galiardi appeared in 7 games, posting 6 points with Bietigheim before suffering a minor knee injury, which forced a return to North America for rehabilitation. Upon recovery, he returned to practice with his former WHL junior team, the Calgary Hitmen.

At the conclusion of the lockout and return to health, Galiardi struggled initially as a healthy scratch for the Sharks before securing a regular role on the team by the playoffs, to finish with 14 points in 36 games. During the 2013 Playoffs, Galiardi played on the team's top line alongside Brent Burns and Joe Thornton. On May 26, 2013, Galiardi scored his first career playoff goal, a game-winner against the Los Angeles Kings, as the Sharks went on to win 2–1.

With Galiardi again a restricted free agent, the Sharks decided to shop his rights around the league. On July 2, 2013, he opted to be traded to his hometown team, the Calgary Flames, for a fourth round draft pick in the 2015 entry draft. The Flames announced immediately that they signed Galiardi to a one-year deal worth $1.25 million. In the 2013–14 season, Galiardi failed to make the impact intended with the Flames. In 62 games he produced 4 goals and 13 assists, and was a healthy scratch a dozen times on the rebuilding Flames. He was not tendered a qualifying offer to remain with the Flames and was released to free agency.

On August 1, 2014, Galiardi signed as a free agent to a one-year, two-way contract worth $750,000 with the Winnipeg Jets. On October 9, 2014, Galiardi made the Winnipeg Jets opening lineup for the 2014–15 season. Scoreless through 17 games with the Jets, Galiardi was placed on waivers on November 25, but remained with the team.

As an impending free-agent, Galiardi left the Jets and the NHL in signing a one-year contract with Swedish club Malmö Redhawks of the SHL on June 9, 2015. In February 2016, Galiardi returned home to North America to concentrate on rehabilitating from an unspecified injury he sustained in early January 2016.

After attending training camp on a professional tryout contract with the St. Louis Blues of the NHL, he opted to return to Europe, and in November 2016, signed a contract with Croatian team KHL Medveščak Zagreb of the Kontinental Hockey League (KHL). In the 2016–17 season, Galiardi had an instant impact offensively, adding 4 goals and 7 points in 8 games in Zagreb before he was traded for financial compensation to the Russian KHL team HC Neftekhimik Nizhnekamsk, on December 23, 2016. Galiardi played in just 8 games for Neftekhimik, going scoreless.

As a free agent in the off-season, Galiardi opted to continue his tenure in the KHL, agreeing to a one-year deal with Dinamo Riga, on July 27, 2017. He again experienced a brief stint in the KHL to start the 2017–18 season, appearing in 11 games for 6 assists before opting for a release from his contract with Riga on September 25, 2017.

Galiardi effectively announced his retirement from professional hockey after 10 seasons, in becoming a co-founder and Chief Marketing Officer in a sports nutrition company specifically catering to Vegans.

== International play ==
Galiardi, a dual citizen of the United States and Canada, chose to represent Team USA and initially attended USA Hockey's 2007 evaluation camp in Lake Placid, New York but was unable to gain selection to the 2007 World Junior Championships. His first foray into the international competition came when he was added to Team USA for the 2010 World Championships following completion of his 2009–10 rookie NHL season on April 29, 2010. On May 7, 2010, he made his Team USA debut in a 2–1 upset defeat in the World record attended Championship opening game against hosts Germany. Galiardi finished with 3 assists in 6 games as the United States slumped to a 13th-place finish.

== Personal ==
His older brother, Rylan Galiardi (born 1986), a former professional hockey player, played in the American Hockey League.

== Career statistics ==
=== Regular season and playoffs ===
			Regular season					Playoffs
Season	Team	League	GP	G	A	Pts	PIM	GP	G	A	Pts	PIM
2004–05	Calgary Northstars AAA	AMHL	36	14	16	30	32	—	—	—	—	—
2005–06	Calgary Royals	AJHL	59	19	37	56	60	—	—	—	—	—
2006–07	Dartmouth College	ECAC	33	14	17	31	30	—	—	—	—	—
2007–08	Calgary Hitmen	WHL	72	18	52	70	77	16	5	19	24	20
2008–09	Lake Erie Monsters	AHL	66	10	17	27	32	—	—	—	—	—
2008–09	Colorado Avalanche	NHL	11	3	1	4	6	—	—	—	—	—
2009–10	Colorado Avalanche	NHL	70	15	24	39	28	6	0	2	2	6
2010–11	Colorado Avalanche	NHL	35	7	8	15	12	—	—	—	—	—
2010–11	Lake Erie Monsters	AHL	1	0	1	1	0	—	—	—	—	—
2011–12	Colorado Avalanche	NHL	55	8	6	14	47	—	—	—	—	—
2011–12	San Jose Sharks	NHL	14	1	0	1	6	3	0	0	0	6
2012–13	SC Bietigheim-Bissingen	2.GBun	7	3	3	6	8	—	—	—	—	—
2012–13	San Jose Sharks	NHL	36	5	9	14	14	11	1	1	2	6
2013–14	Calgary Flames	NHL	62	4	13	17	21	—	—	—	—	—
2014–15	Winnipeg Jets	NHL	38	1	0	1	2	—	—	—	—	—
2015–16	Malmö Redhawks	SHL	29	3	12	15	42	—	—	—	—	—
2016–17	KHL Medveščak Zagreb	KHL	8	4	3	7	2	—	—	—	—	—
2016–17	Neftekhimik Nizhnekamsk	KHL	8	0	0	0	2	—	—	—	—	—
2017–18	Dinamo Riga	KHL	11	0	6	6	8	—	—	—	—	—
NHL totals			321	44	61	105	136	20	1	3	4	18

=== International ===
Year	Team	Event	Result	GP	G	A	Pts	PIM
2010	United States	WC	13th	6	0	3	3	8
Senior totals				6	0	3	3	8

== Awards and honors ==
Award	Year
AJHL
South All-Star	2006
College
All-ECAC Hockey Rookie Team	2006–07
WHL
Calgary Hitmen Rookie of the Year	2008
