= Ryland H. New =

Canadian businessman and owner of thoroughbred racehorses (1888-1979)

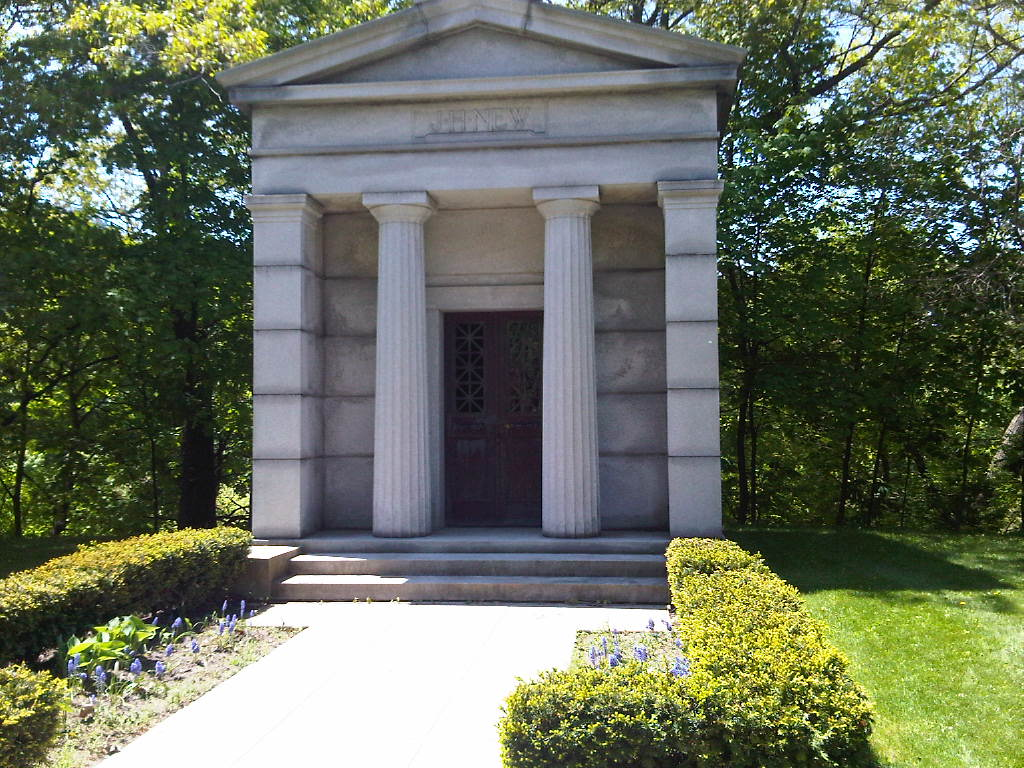
The New family's mausoleum at Mount Pleasant Cemetery, Toronto

Ryland Herbert New (July 16, 1888 - November 21, 1979) was a Canadian businessman and the owner of thoroughbred racehorses that twice won the Kings' Plate.

== Life and career ==
Born in Toronto, Ontario, New was educated at Upper Canada College and the University of Toronto. In 1913, following the death of his father, Jacob Herbert New (1859-1913), he took over the family-owned Hamilton and Toronto Sewer Pipe Company (Limited). He eventually merged his successful business with two other Ontario companies to create the National Sewer Pipe Company Limited.

A resident of Oakville, Ontario, New was active in church and community affairs. During the Great Depression, he served as Chairman of the Executive Committee of the Federal Home Improvement Plan, established by the Government of Canada in 1937 to provide subsidized interest rates on rehabilitation loans for housing. His wife Helen Isabel was named national president of the Imperial Order Daughters of the Empire in 1944, was made a Commander of the British Empire for her wartime charitable activities in 1946, and served on the 1950 Royal Commission On Education In Ontario. A member of the United Church of Canada, New donated funds in 1954 that helped build the Halton Region presbytery.

The owner of a number of thoroughbred racehorses, New maintained a racing stable in Oakville. He won the 1927 Kings' Plate with Troutlet and the 1930 running with Aymond. He had bought Troutlet from Charles Millar's estate only a few months before. He served as vice-president of the Canadian Thoroughbred Horse Society (CTHS) for a time, and for many years remained on its Board of Directors. In 2002, he was inducted into the Canadian Horse Racing Hall of Fame in the Builders category.

New died in 1979 at the age of ninety-one, and he was buried in the New family's mausoleum at Mount Pleasant Cemetery in Toronto.
