= Ryann =

Ryann is a female given name. Notable people with the name include:

- Ryann Donnelly (born 1986), American musical artist
- Ryann Holmes (born 1984), American consultant
- Ryann Krais (born 1990), American athlete
- Ryann O'Toole (born 1987), American professional golfer
- Ryann Redmond, American actress
- Ryann Richardson, American political activist
- Ryann Shane (born 1993), American actress
- Ryann Torrero (born 1990), Chilean footballer
