= Ryan Williams =

Ryan Williams may refer to:

== Sports ==
- Ryan Williams (Australian rules footballer) (born 1988), Australian rules footballer
- Ryan Williams (BMX rider) (born 1994), Australian freestyle BMX and scooter rider

Association football

- Ryan Williams (footballer, born 1978), English footballer
- Ryan Williams (footballer, born 1991), English footballer
- Ryan Williams (footballer, born 1993), Indian football winger
- Ryan Williams (men's soccer, born 1996), American soccer midfielder
- Ryan Williams (women's soccer) (born 1996), American soccer defender

Gridiron football

- Ryan Williams (running back) (born 1990), American football running back
- Ryan Coleman-Williams (born 2007), American football wide receiver

== Other ==
- Ryan Williams (computer scientist) (born 1979), American computer scientist
- Ryan Williams (entrepreneur) (born 1988), technology entrepreneur
- Ryan Williams (American politician) (born 1973), member of the Tennessee House of Representatives
- Ryan Williams (Canadian politician) (born 1979), Member of Parliament for Bay of Quinte
- Ryan Williams (born 1969), English DJ and record producer, better known by his stage name Roni Size.
- Ryan Piers Williams (born 1984), American actor, director, and writer
- Ryun Williams (born 1969), American college basketball coach
