= Forest for the Trees (organization) =

Nonprofit art organization in Portland, Oregon

- Logo
- Formation: 2013; 13 years ago
- Founded at: Portland, Oregon, United States
- Website: www.fftt.space

Forest for the Trees, or Forest for the Trees NW, is a nonprofit organization established in Portland, Oregon, in 2013, that brings artists from around the world to create murals throughout the city. The project is partially funded by the Regional Arts & Culture Council.

== History ==
Fifteen artists participated in 2013. Mural locations and artists include:

- Southeast 9th and Stark, Marcelo Macedo
- Southeast 26th and Steele, Taka Sudo
- Southwest 12th and Washington, Rone
- Southeast 9th and Oak, Yoskay Yamamoto and Taka Sudo
- Southeast 8th and Sandy, Yoskay Yamamoto and J.Shea
- Southeast 9th and Clay, MADSTEEZ and Ōyama Enrico Isamu Letter
- Southeast 12th and Madison, Kamea Hadar and Meggs
- Southeast 9th and Hawthorne, Blaine Fontana
- Northeast 20th and Sandy, Gage Hamilton and Zach Yarrington
- Northeast 21st and Alberta, Blaine Fontana, Zach Yarrington, and Jun Inoue

Twenty artists participated in 2014, creating twenty new public artworks.

In 2015, 29 artists produced 19 murals.
