= Ryan Hall (soccer) =

American soccer player

Personal information
- Place of birth: United States
- Position: Defender

Senior career*
Years	Team	Apps	(Gls)
2003-2004	Syracuse Salty Dogs	25	(1)
2005	Rochester Rhinos		
2006-2007	Cleveland Internationals	10	(0)
- * Club domestic league appearances and goals

Ryan Hall (born in the United States) is an American retired soccer player.
