= Ryan Finley =

Ryan Finley may refer to:

- Ryan Finley (soccer) (born 1991), American soccer player
- Ryan Finley (businessman), American businessperson and the founder of SurveyMonkey
- Ryan Finley (American football) (born 1994), American football quarterback
