= Ryan Taylor =

Ryan Taylor may refer to:

== Sportspeople ==
- Ryan Taylor (American football) (born 1987), American football tight end
- Ryan Taylor (basketball) (born 1992), American basketball player
- Ryan Taylor (footballer, born 1984), English football full back
- Ryan Taylor (footballer, born 1988), English football striker
- Ryan Taylor (hurler), Irish hurler who plays for Clare and Clooney–Quin
- Ryan Taylor (paratriathlete) (born 1993), English paratriathlete
- Ryan Taylor (sport shooter) (born 1980), New Zealand rifle shooter
- Tyler Rust (born 1987), American professional wrestler formerly used ring name Ryan Taylor

== Other ==
- Ryan Taylor (politician) (born 1970), former North Dakota Senate minority leader
- Trinity the Tuck, American drag queen born Ryan Taylor
