= Brian North Lee =

Brian North Lee FSA, (27 December 1936 in Syston, Leicestershire – 24 February 2007 in London) was a former teacher, Fellow of the Society of Antiquaries of London since 1978 and expert on bookplates, or "ex-libris" as he preferred to call them. He was a prolific author on the last, and one of the co-founders in 1972 of The Bookplate Society. He was of the Christian faith, worked in Ghana for several years and kept contact with the country, and in later life worked as a volunteer for the Terrance Higgins Trust. Lee never married.

== Selected publications ==
- The bookplate designs of Rex Whistler, 1973.
- Early printed book labels, 1976.
- British bookplates, 1979.
- The ex-libris of Simon Brett, 1982.
- British Royal bookplates and ex-libris of related families, Scolar Press, 1992. ISBN 0859678830
- Scottish bookplates. (with Sir Ilay Campbell Bt.)
