= Ryan Johnson =

Ryan Johnson may refer to:

== Sports ==
- Ryan Johnson (baseball) (born 2002), American baseball player
- Ryan Johnson (footballer, born 1984), Jamaican international footballer
- Ryan Johnson (footballer, born 1996), English-born Northern Irish footballer
- Ryan Johnson (ice hockey, born 1976), retired Canadian professional ice hockey centre
- Ryan Johnson (ice hockey, born 2001), American professional ice hockey defenseman
- Ryan Johnson (skier) (born 1974), Canadian freestyle skier

== Other ==
- Ryan Johnson (actor) (born 1979), Australian actor
- Ryan Johnson (artist) (born 1978), American artist
- Ryan Johnson (marine scientist) (born 1977), marine biologist
- Ryan R. Johnson, producer

== See also ==
- Rian Johnson (born 1973), American film director
- Ryan Johnston (disambiguation)
