= Rayan Khemais =

French footballer (born 1998)

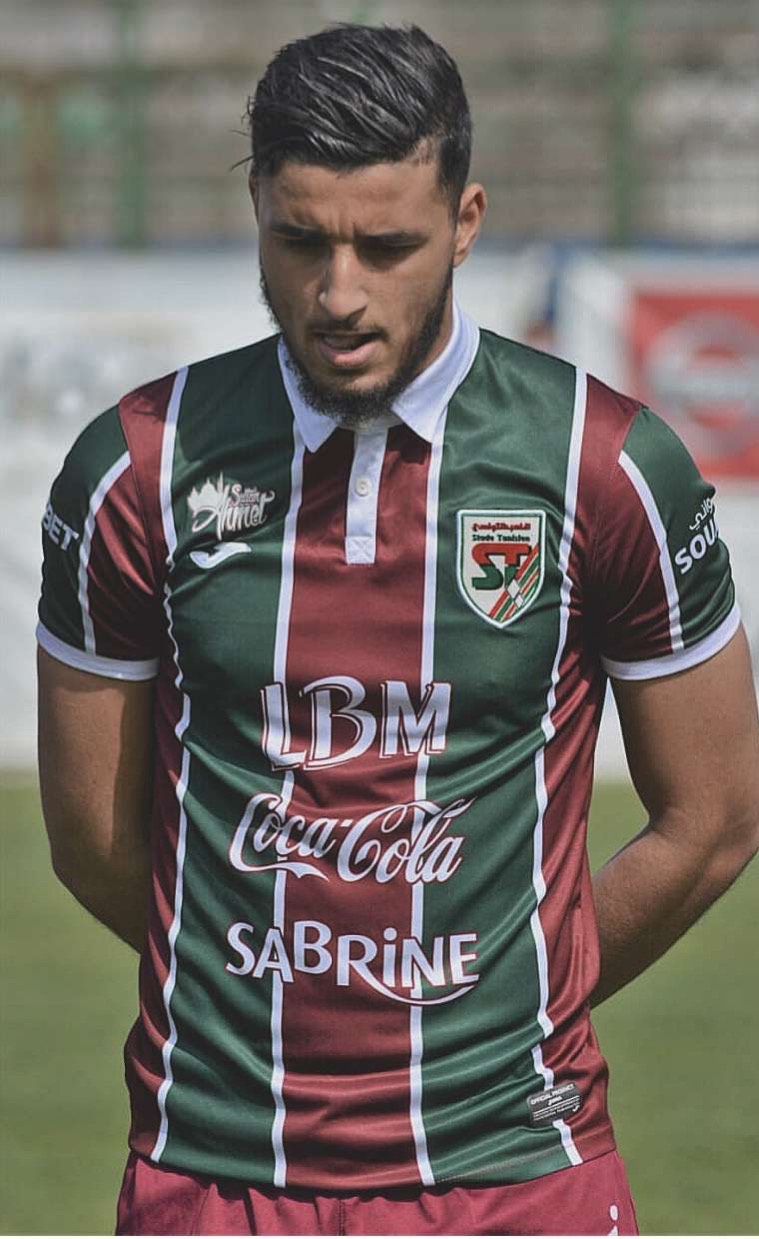
- Khemais with Stade Tunisien in 2021

Personal information
- Date of birth: 7 April 1998 (age 28)
- Place of birth: Nîmes, France
- Height: 1.88 m (6 ft 2 in)
- Position: Defender

Team information
- Current team: Stade Tunisien

Senior career*
| Years | Team | Apps | (Gls) |
| 2016–2018 | Nîmes B | 44 | (1) |
| 2018– | Stade Tunisien | 30 | (0) |
- * Club domestic league appearances and goals as of 18:04, 26 January 2022 (UTC)

Rayan Khemais (Arabic: ريان خميس; born 7 April 1998), is a French footballer who currently plays as a defender for Stade Tunisien.

== Career statistics ==
=== Club ===
As of 26 January 2022.

| Club | Season | League | | | Cup | | Continental | | Other | | Total | |
| Club | Season | Division | Apps | Goals | Apps | Goals | Apps | Goals | Apps | Goals | Apps | Goals |
|---|---|---|---|---|---|---|---|---|---|---|---|---|
| Nîmes B | 2015–16 | Championnat National 3 | 4 | 0 | 0 | 0 | – | | 0 | 0 | 4 | 0 |
| Nîmes B | 2016–17 | Championnat National 3 | 14 | 0 | 0 | 0 | – | | 0 | 0 | 14 | 0 |
| Nîmes B | 2017–18 | Championnat National 3 | 17 | 0 | 1 (Note: Appearances in the Coupe de France) | 0 | – | | 0 | 0 | 18 | 0 |
| Nîmes B | 2018–19 | Championnat National 2 | 8 | 1 | 0 | 0 | – | | 0 | 0 | 8 | 1 |
| Nîmes B | Total | | 43 | 1 | 1 | 0 | 0 | 0 | 0 | 0 | 44 | 1 |
| Stade Tunisien | 2018–19 | CLP-1 | 13 | 0 | 2 (Note: Appearances in the Tunisian Cup) | 0 | 0 | 0 | 0 | 0 | 15 | 0 |
| Stade Tunisien | 2019–20 | CLP-1 | 5 | 0 | 2 | 0 | 0 | 0 | 0 | 0 | 7 | 0 |
| Stade Tunisien | 2020–21 | CLP-1 | 12 | 0 | 0 | 0 | 0 | 0 | 0 | 0 | 12 | 0 |
| Stade Tunisien | 2021–22 | CLP-2 | 0 | 0 | 0 | 0 | 0 | 0 | 0 | 0 | 0 | 0 |
| Stade Tunisien | Total | | 30 | 0 | 4 | 0 | 0 | 0 | 0 | 0 | 34 | 0 |
| Career total | | | 73 | 1 | 5 | 0 | 0 | 0 | 0 | 0 | 78 | 1 |
