= Ryan Fox (disambiguation) =

Ryan Fox (born 1987) is a New Zealand golfer.

Ryan Fox may also refer to:

- Ryan Fox (musician), member of American indie rock band The Good Life
- Ryan T. Fox (born 1980), American rower
