= Rylan Galiardi =

American-born Canadian ice hockey player

- Born: June 30, 1986 (age 38); Phoenix, Arizona, U.S.
- Relatives: TJ Galiardi (brother)
Ice hockey career
- Height: 6 ft 1 in (185 cm)
- Weight: 190 lb (86 kg; 13 st 8 lb)
- Position: Centre
- Shot: Left
- WCHA team AHL teams ECHL teams EIHL team: Minnesota State Mavericks; San Antonio Rampage; Providence Bruins; Bridgeport Sound Tigers; Florida Everblades; Gwinnett Gladiators; San Francisco Bulls; Idaho Steelheads; Utah Grizzlies; Sheffield Steelers
- Playing career: 2011–2014

Rylan Galiardi (born June 30, 1986) is an American former professional ice hockey center. His younger brother, TJ Galiardi, is also a former professional ice hockey player in the National Hockey League.

== Playing career ==
Undrafted, Galiardi played NCAA college hockey with the Minnesota State Mavericks men's ice hockey team in the Western Collegiate Hockey Association, where he scored 29 goals and 52 assists for 81 points, and earned 82 penalty minutes in 140 games played. In his first professional season, Galiardi signed a one-year deal with the Florida Everblades of the ECHL. In 61 games, Galiardi showed offensive talents in posting 18 goals and 47 points, and was twice briefly loaned to the American Hockey League with the Providence Bruins and Bridgeport Sound Tigers.

Before his second professional season, Galiardi signed as a free agent to remain in the ECHL with the Gwinnett Gladiators on July 18, 2012. In the 2012–13 season, Galiardi established himself amongst the Gladiators leading scorers. On January 14, 2013, Galiardi was traded by Gwinnett, along with Christian Ouellet and Cody Carlson to the San Francisco Bulls in exchange for Justin Bowers and Sacha Guimond. His tenure with the Bulls was short lived when he was traded after 5 games to the Idaho Steelheads on February 20, 2013. In joining his third club for the season, Galiardi finished with 12 points in 15 games before he was injured in the Steelheads' playoff run to the Conference finals.

On August 18, 2013, Galiardi left North American professional hockey as a free agent and signed his first contract abroad with British club, the Sheffield Steelers of the Elite Ice Hockey League. In the 2013–14 season, Galiardi scored 2 goals in 12 games before he was released due to the Steelers reaching their import limit on October 18, 2013. Galiardi returned to the ECHL with the Utah Grizzlies where he played his last professional season.

Galiardi retired to accept a Head Coach role with the Southern Tier Xpress in the junior NA3HL. For the 2015–16 season, Galiardi is the head coach of the U18 Sioux Falls Junior Stampede.

== Career statistics ==
			Regular season					Playoffs
Season	Team	League	GP	G	A	Pts	PIM	GP	G	A	Pts	PIM
2004–05	Minnesota Blizzard	NAHL	17	5	7	12	17	—	—	—	—	—
2005–06	Sioux City Musketeers	USHL	4	0	1	1	2	—	—	—	—	—
2005–06	Minnesota Blizzard	NAHL	53	14	27	41	66	5	3	1	4	0
2006–07	Alexandria Blizzard	NAHL	60	25	32	57	79	5	0	3	3	10
2007–08	Minnesota State Mavericks	WCHA	32	3	6	9	10	—	—	—	—	—
2008–09	Minnesota State Mavericks	WCHA	38	8	20	28	20	—	—	—	—	—
2009–10	Minnesota State Mavericks	WCHA	38	11	14	25	28	—	—	—	—	—
2010–11	Minnesota State Mavericks	WCHA	32	7	12	19	24	—	—	—	—	—
2010–11	San Antonio Rampage	AHL	10	0	2	2	2	—	—	—	—	—
2011–12	Florida Everblades	ECHL	61	18	29	47	68	2	0	0	0	0
2011–12	Providence Bruins	AHL	1	0	0	0	0	—	—	—	—	—
2011–12	Bridgeport Sound Tigers	AHL	2	0	0	0	2	—	—	—	—	—
2012–13	Gwinnett Gladiators	ECHL	39	11	10	21	59	—	—	—	—	—
2012–13	San Francisco Bulls	ECHL	5	1	3	4	7	—	—	—	—	—
2012–13	Idaho Steelheads	ECHL	15	2	10	12	12	7	1	1	2	0
2013–14	Sheffield Steelers	EIHL	12	2	7	9	6	—	—	—	—	—
2013–14	Utah Grizzlies	ECHL	15	4	2	6	20	—	—	—	—	—
AHL totals			13	0	2	2	4	—	—	—	—	—
