= Ryan Watson =

Ryan Watson is the name of:

- Ryan Watson (actor) (born 1993), English actor and voice actor
- Ryan Watson (baseball) (born 1997), American baseball player
- Ryan Watson (cricketer) (born 1976), cricketer who plays for Scotland
- Ryan Watson (footballer) (born 1993), English professional footballer for Tranmere Rovers
- Ryan Watson (ice hockey) (born 1981), Italian-Canadian professional ice hockey player
- Ryan Watson (New Zealand cricketer) (born 1994), New Zealand cricketer
- Ryan Watson (politician), leader of the Green Party of Nova Scotia, 2008–2009
