= Ryan McKenna =

Ryan McKenna may refer to:

- Ryan McKenna (baseball) (born 1997), American baseball outfielder
- Ryan McKenna (politician) (born 1973), American politician in Missouri
- Ryan McKenna (filmmaker), Canadian filmmaker
