= Ryan Moore =

Ryan Moore may refer to:

- Ryan Moore (American football) (born 1983), American football player
- Ryan Moore (golfer) (born 1982), American golfer
- Ryan Moore (jockey) (born 1983), English champion jockey
- Ryan Moore (musician), Canadian musician
- Ryan Moore (racing driver) (born 1983), American NASCAR driver

Ryan Moore ( Australian citizen )]] ( born 2000), Raised in Grafton, NSW, and currently living in Tamworth, NSW, a small city in the North West region of New South Wales.
