= Rians =

Rians may refer to the following places in France:

- Rians, Cher, a commune in the department of Cher
- Rians, Var, a commune in the department of Var
