= Ryan Lee (hedge fund manager) =

- Born: Seoul, South Korea
- Education: University of California, Los Angeles
- Occupations: Hedge fund manager Youngest council member of The National Unification Advisory Council

Ryan Lee is an American hedge fund manager based in Los Angeles, California. His career has included positions at Merrill Lynch, AP Funds, and Rodeo Acquisition Partners, where he became the firm's youngest managing director. He has also served as vice chairman of Bithumb Thailand and Bithumb Japan. In addition, Lee has contributed to K Radio AM 1230 as an economic analyst and correspondent.

Lee was born in the Republic of Korea and raised in Southern California. He studied economics at the University of California, Los Angeles (UCLA), and served in the U.S. Air Force for six years.

In 2011, Lee was appointed by South Korean President Lee Myung-bak to the National Unification Advisory Council, becoming its youngest council member.

== See also ==
- List of University of California, Los Angeles people
