= Ryan Thompson =

Ryan Thompson may refer to:

- Ryan Thompson (outfielder) (born 1967), American baseball player
- Ryan Thompson (pitcher) (born 1992), American baseball player
- Ryan Thompson (footballer) (born 1985), Jamaican footballer
- Ryan Thompson (basketball) (born 1988), American basketball player

== See also ==
- Ryan Thomson (disambiguation)
