= Queery =

LGBTQ+ podcast

Queery is an American podcast created and hosted by comedian Cameron Esposito. The podcast is centered around queerness—the facets of the LGBTQ experience—and self-identifying queer guests. Guests range from public figures such as Olympic figure-skater Adam Rippon, and musicians Tegan & Sara, to more niche-group individuals such as Irish singer-songwriter Soak, animator and Steven Universe creator Rebecca Sugar, and comedian-writer Travon Free.

== Background ==
Esposito's stated intention with starting Queery surrounded the identity politics that shape the LGBTQ+ landscape. In a Billboard interview about the podcast and her other ventures, Esposito said the show is about "reinvesting in the queer community in a way that I don't think I let myself before." In her show's preface, Esposito states that the show is "about individual experience and personal identity." She echoes the thesis in an Amy Poehler's Smart Girls interview. The show is produced by the Earwolf Network and engineered by Jordan Duffy.

== Awards and nominations ==
- In September 2018, Queery was named as one of Medium's "Podcasts We Love."
- In late 2019, Queery was placed on the eligibility list for nomination as a Podcast Awards 2020 winner.
- In November 2019, Queery was categorized as one of the "best LGBT podcasts" by Player.fm.

== Episodes ==
Episode	Guests
Episode 1	River Butcher
Episode 2	Solomon Georgio
Episode 3	Joey Soloway
Episode 4	Madin Lopez
Episode 5	Andrea Fontenot
Episode 6	Jeffrey Bowyer-Chapman
Episode 7	Stephanie Beatriz
Episode 8	Casey Ley
Episode 9	Jen Richards
Episode 10	Evan Rachel Wood
Episode 11	Tegan Quin
Episode 12	Sara Quin
Episode 13	Rebecca Sugar
Episode 14	Shadi Petosky
Episode 15	Kathy Tu
Episode 16	Mary Lambert
Episode 17	Andrew Gurza
Episode 18	Vivek Shraya
Episode 19	Janine Brito
Episode 20	Gabe Liedman
Episode 21	AW
Episode 22	Eva Sweeney
Episode 23	Jenny Owen Youngs
Episode 24	Lena Waithe
Episode 25	Jeffrey Marsh
Episode 26	Andrea Gibson
Episode 27	Brittani Nichols
Episode 28	Bryan Safi
Episode 29	Margaret Cho
Episode 30	Gabe Dunn
Episode 31	Clea DuVall
Episode 32	Darcy Michael and River Butcher
Episode 33	Roxane Gay
Episode 34	Dawn Laguens
Episode 35	Alia Shawkat
Episode 36	Trixie Mattel
Episode 37	Lea DeLaria
Episode 38	Larkin Christie
Episode 39	Travon Free
Episode 40	Grace Bonney
Episode 41	Blair Imani
Episode 42	Josh Thomas
Episode 43	LP
Episode 44	Amber Hikes
Episode 45	Pony Lee
Episode 46	Murray Hill
Episode 47	Virginia Bauman and Iris Bainum-Houle
Episode 48	Brian Jordan Alvarez
Episode 49	Kim Fountain
Episode 50	Jacqueline Woodson
Episode 51	Tig Notaro
Episode 52	Amit Paley
Episode 53	Jen Ruggirello
Episode 54	Riley Silverman
Episode 55	Todd Glass
Episode 56	Nik Kacy
Episode 57	Riese Bernard
Episode 58	Yes on 3 w/ Ariel Sussman and Kasey Suffredini
Episode 59	Garrard Conley
Episode 60	Lydia Polgreen
Episode 61	Mae Martin
Episode 62	Sara Kate Ellis
Episode 63	Wade Davis
Episode 64	Emma McIllroy
Episode 65	Julien Baker
Episode 66	Ira Madison III
Episode 67	Best of 2018
Episode 68	Fran Dunaway
Episode 69	Fran Turado
Episode 70	Alexandra Billings
Episode 71	Dan Savage
Episode 72	Julia Turshen
Episode 73	Scott Thompson
Episode 74	Our Lady J
Episode 75	Mark Takano
Episode 76	Chris Nee
Episode 77	Jacob Tobia
Episode 78	Fenton Railey and Anthony Barbato
Episode 79	Ilene Chaiken
Episode 80	Micah James
Episode 81	Abby Wambach
Episode 82	Anthony Rapp
Episode 83	Sina Grace
Episode 84	Fawzia Mirza
Episode 85	Madeleine Olnek
Episode 86	Soak
Episode 87	Jazzmyne Robbins
Episode 88	Elliot Musgrave
Episode 89	Team Dresch
Episode 90	Anthony M. Lopez
Episode 91	Eugene Lee Yang
Episode 92	Paul Harfleet
Episode 93	Elena Rose Vera
Episode 94	Ryan O'Connell
Episode 95	Ian Alexander
Episode 96	E. Alex Jung
Episode 97	Kalen Allen
Episode 98	Rebecca Sugar
Episode 99	Travon Free
Episode 100	Adam Rippon
Episode 101	Amber Hikes
Episode 102	Brendan Scannell
Episode 103	Maulik Pancholy
Episode 104	Guy Branum
Episode 105	Jeff Hammerberg
Episode 106	Tegan & Sara
Episode 107	Leanne Pittsford
Episode 108	JD Samson
Episode 109	Jack Thompson
Episode 110	Madame Gandhi
Episode 111	Maggie Thrash
Episode 112	Fortune Feimster
Episode 113	Justin Tranter
Episode 114	Arlan Hamilton
Episode 115	Kit Williamson
Episode 116	Chani Nicholas
Episode 117	Amy Spalding
Episode 118	Best of 2019, Part 1
Episode 119	Best of 2019, Part 2
Episode 120	Carmen Maria Machado
Episode 121	Carl Charles
Episode 122	Casey McQuiston
Episode 123	Teresa Lee
Episode 124	Vicky Vox
Episode 125	Saeed Jones
Episode 126	Georgette Gomez
Episode 127	Kristin Russo
Episode 128	Bex Taylor-Klaus
Episode 129	Mo Welch
Episode 130	Katy Nishimoto
Episode 131	Abby Wambach (re-release)
Episode 132	Elyse Fritschel
Episode 133	Alice Wu
Episode 134	Nicolle Maroulis
Episode 135	Glennon Doyle
Episode 136	Eve Lindley
Episode 137	Alice Wu (re-release)
Episode 138	Tai Leclaire
Episode 139	Imani Rupert-Gordon
Episode 140	Chasten Buttigieg
Episode 141	Anne McClain
Episode 142	Special Note
Episode 143	Alphonso David
Episode 144	Leo Sheng
Episode 145	Kara Swisher
Episode 146	Brandon Kyle Goodman
Episode 147	Anne McClain (re-release)
Episode 148	Renn Tan
Episode 149	Michele Rayner-Goolsby
Episode 150	Elle Hearns
Episode 151	Phillip Picardi
Episode 152	Tyler Glenn
Episode 153	Ashlee Marie Preston & Julianna Brudek
Episode 154	Casper ter Kuile
Episode 155	Liz Feldman
Episode 156	Jwan Yosef
Episode 157	James Tom (then known as Jes Tom)
Episode 158	Andrew Rannells
Episode 159	Nyle DiMarco
Episode 160	Kareem Tabsch
Episode 161	Peppermint
Episode 162	Alan Cumming & Chris Sweeney
Episode 163	Abbi Jacobson
Episode 164	Jess Salomon & Eman El-Husseini
Episode 165	Marlee Grace
Episode 166	Parvesh Cheena
Episode 167	Hiromi Kamata
Episode 168	T'Nia Miller
Episode 169	Alicia Garza
Episode 170	Saeed Jones (re-release)
Episode 171	Best of 2020 Part 1
Episode 172	Best of 2020 Part 2
Episode 173	Angela Chen
Episode 174	ND Stevenson
Episode 175	Sarah Costello & Kayla Kaszyca
Episode 176	Iliana Regan
Episode 177	Hayley Kiyoko
Episode 178	Chris Mosier
Episode 179	Aidan Park
Episode 180	Best Of
Episode 181	Bob the Drag Queen
Episode 182	Stephanie Burt
Episode 183	Katy Nishimoto (re-release)
Episode 184	Geena Rocero
Episode 185	Brandi Carlile
Episode 186	Precious Brady-Davis
Episode 187	Alaska Thunderfuck
Episode 188	Kacen Callender
Episode 189	Cj Giovingo
Episode 190	Diona Reasonover
Episode 191	McKensie Mack
Episode 192	Lauren Hough
Episode 193	Casey McQuiston (re-release)
Episode 194	Claud
Episode 195	Harvey Guillén
Episode 196	Brandi Carlile Part 2
Episode 197	Mae Martin
Episode 198	Theo Germaine
Episode 199	Daryn Carp & Liz Culley
Episode 200	JP Brammer
Episode 201	Semler
Episode 202	Junauda Petrus-Nasah
Episode 203	Jonathan Bennett & Jaymes Vaughan
Episode 204	Stephanie Allynne
Episode 205	Armand Fields & Celeste Pechous
Episode 206	Chase Strangio & Nikki Levy
Episode 207	Brooke Eden
Episode 208	Andrea Lawlor
Episode 209	Froskurinn
Episode 210	Kelsey Wroten
Episode 211	Jon Lovett
Episode 212	Joe Dombrowski
Episode 213	Misha Osherovich & Jasmine Johnson
Episode 214	Jean Kyoung Frazier
Episode 215	Marion Hill & Hannah Pepper
Episode 216	Alicia Garza (re-release)
Episode 217	Tai Leclaire (re-release)
Episode 218	Jwan Yosef (re-release)
Episode 219	Best of 2021 Part 1
Episode 220	Best of 2021 Part 2
Episode 221	Best of 2021 Part 3
Episode 222	Daniel Webb
Episode 223	Charlie Jane Anders
Episode 224	Melissa King
Episode 225	Amanda Grace Jenkins
Episode 226	Malinda Lo
Episode 227	Samantha Ronson
Episode 228	Ali Liebert
Episode 229	Irene Tu
Episode 230	Sarah Shook
Episode 231	Jill Gutowitz
Episode 232	Liv Hewson
Episode 233	Dylan Marron
Episode 234	Torrey Peters
Episode 235	Vico Ortiz
Episode 236	Ijeoma Oluo
Episode 237	Christina Wilson
Episode 238	Brandi Carlile (re-release)
Episode 239	Reverend Jes Kast
Episode 240	Renitta Shannon
Episode 241	Andrea Gibson Part 2
Episode 242	Gabe Montesanti
Episode 243	Chris Mosier (re-release)
Episode 244	Meg Stalter
Episode 245	Betty Who
Episode 246	Jessica Lindsey
Episode 247	Brian Michael Smith
Episode 248	Katy Nishimoto (re-release)
Episode 249	Eleanor Medhurst
Episode 250	Jared Goldstein
Episode 251	Robin Tran
Episode 252	Kiku Hughes
Episode 253	Harvey Guillén (re-release)
Episode 254	Jeffrey Galaise
Episode 255	Nori Reed
Episode 256	Big Dipper
Episode 257	Sarah Costello & Kayla Kaszyca (re-release)
Episode 258	Andrea Lawlor (re-release)
Episode 259	JP Brammer (re-release)
Episode 260	Precious Brady-Davis (re-release)
Episode 261	Jules Ohman
Episode 262	E.R. Fightmaster
Episode 263	Kelly Fields
Episode 264	Abbi Jacobson (re-release)
Episode 265	Drag Queen Supercut
Episode 266	Jacqueline Toboni
Episode 267	Katie Pruitt
Episode 268	Best of 2022 Part 1
Episode 269	Best of 2022 Part 2
Episode 270	Best of 2022 Part 3
Episode 271	Best of 2022 Part 4
Episode 272	Chris Belcher
Episode 273	Clea DuVall (re-release)
Episode 274	Junauda Petrus-Nasah (re-release)
Episode 275	Casper ter Kuile (re-release)
Episode 276	Lamya H.
Episode 277	Bob the Drag Queen (re-release)
Episode 278	Blair Imani (re-release)
Episode 279	Melanie Field
Episode 280	Reverend Jes Kast (re-release)
Episode 281	Vico Ortiz (re-release)
Episode 282	Kristen Kish
Episode 283	Theo Germaine (re-release)
Episode 284	Kalen Allen (re-release)
Episode 285	Mae Martin (re-release)
Episode 286	Alan Cumming & Chris Sweeney (re-release)
Episode 287	Emma Willmann
Episode 288	Leo Sheng (re-release)
Episode 289	Carmen Maria Machado (re-release)
Episode 290	Adam Rippon (re-release)
Episode 291	Meg Stalter (re-release)
Episode 292	Coco (Bob's Dance Shop)
Episode 293	Madi B Webb
Episode 294	Cameron Esposito (self-interview)
Episode 295	Zhipeng Zhu, Symone Salib, Mads "Mady" G, Bianca Xunise, Shanée Benjamin
Episode 296	Emily Bielgus & Mara Herbkersman
Episode 297	Ashley Ray
Episode 298	Sierra Katow
Episode 299	Kai Cheng Thom
Episode 300	Jess Rothschild
Episode 301	Ali Kolbert
Episode 302	Jordan Crucchiola
Episode 303	Genavieve Jaffe
Episode 304	Maia Kobabe
Episode 305	K. Flay
Episode 306	Simon Kent Fung
Episode 307	Roz Hernandez
Episode 308	Sabrina Wu
Episode 309	Tre'vell Anderson
Episode 310	Charlie Sprinkman
Episode 311	Terry J. Benton-Walker
Episode 312	Brian Wenke
Episode 313	Leo Aquino
Episode 314	Kamala Puligandla
Episode 315	Sam Sanders, Saeed Jones, & Zach Stafford
Episode 316	G Flip
Episode 317	Best of 2023 Part 1
Episode 318	Best of 2023 Part 2
Episode 319	Best of 2023 Part 3
Episode 320	Best of 2023 Part 4
Episode 321	Kris Kidd
Episode 322	Galen Kirkpatrick
Episode 323	Oscar Montoya
Episode 324	Michael Adams
Episode 325	McKenzie Goodwin & Rachel Scanlon
Episode 326	Farewell

== See also ==
- List of LGBT podcasts
