= Medhurst =

Medhurst is a surname, and may refer to:

- Charles Medhurst (1896–1954), Royal Air Force officer
- Cameron Medhurst (born 1965), Australian figure skater
- Eleanor Medhurst (born 1997), fashion historian
- George Medhurst (1759–1827), mechanical engineer and inventor
- Harry Medhurst (1916–1984), British footballer
- Natalie Medhurst (born 1984), Australian netball player
- Paul Medhurst (born 1981), Australian rules footballer
- Paul Medhurst (cyclist) (1953–2009), New Zealand track cyclist
- Richard Medhurst (born 1991), Syrian-British journalist
- R. Medhurst (Sussex cricketer), Reginald Frank Medhurst a.k.a. Robert Henry Medhurst (dates uncertain), English cricketer active from 1948 to 1951
- Walter Henry Medhurst (1796–1857), English Congregationalist missionary to China
- Sir Walter Henry Medhurst (1822–1885), British diplomat

== See also ==
- Edward Ivo Medhurst Barrett (1879-1950), English cricketer and rugby player
