= Turshen =

Turshen is a surname. Notable people with the surname include:

- Julia Turshen (born 1985), American author
- Max M. Turshen (1906–1980), American lawyer
