= List of gay, lesbian or bisexual people: F =

This is a partial list of notable people who were or are gay men, lesbian or bisexual.

The historical concept and definition of sexual orientation varies and has changed greatly over time; for example the general term "gay" wasn't used to describe sexual orientation until the mid 20th century. A number of different classification schemes have been used to describe sexual orientation since the mid-19th century, and scholars have often defined the term "sexual orientation" in divergent ways. Indeed, several studies have found that much of the research about sexual orientation has failed to define the term at all, making it difficult to reconcile the results of different studies. However, most definitions include a psychological component (such as the direction of an individual's erotic desire) and/or a behavioural component (which focuses on the sex of the individual's sexual partner/s). Some prefer to simply follow an individual's self-definition or identity.

The high prevalence of people from the West on this list may be due to societal attitudes towards homosexuality. The Pew Research Center's 2013 Global Attitudes Survey found that there is "greater acceptance in more secular and affluent countries," with "publics in 39 countries [having] broad acceptance of homosexuality in North America, the European Union, and much of Latin America, but equally widespread rejection in predominantly Muslim nations and in Africa, as well as in parts of Asia and in Russia. Opinion about the acceptability of homosexuality is divided in Israel, Poland and Bolivia." As of 2013, Americans are divided – a majority (60 percent) believes homosexuality should be accepted, while 33 percent disagree.

== F ==
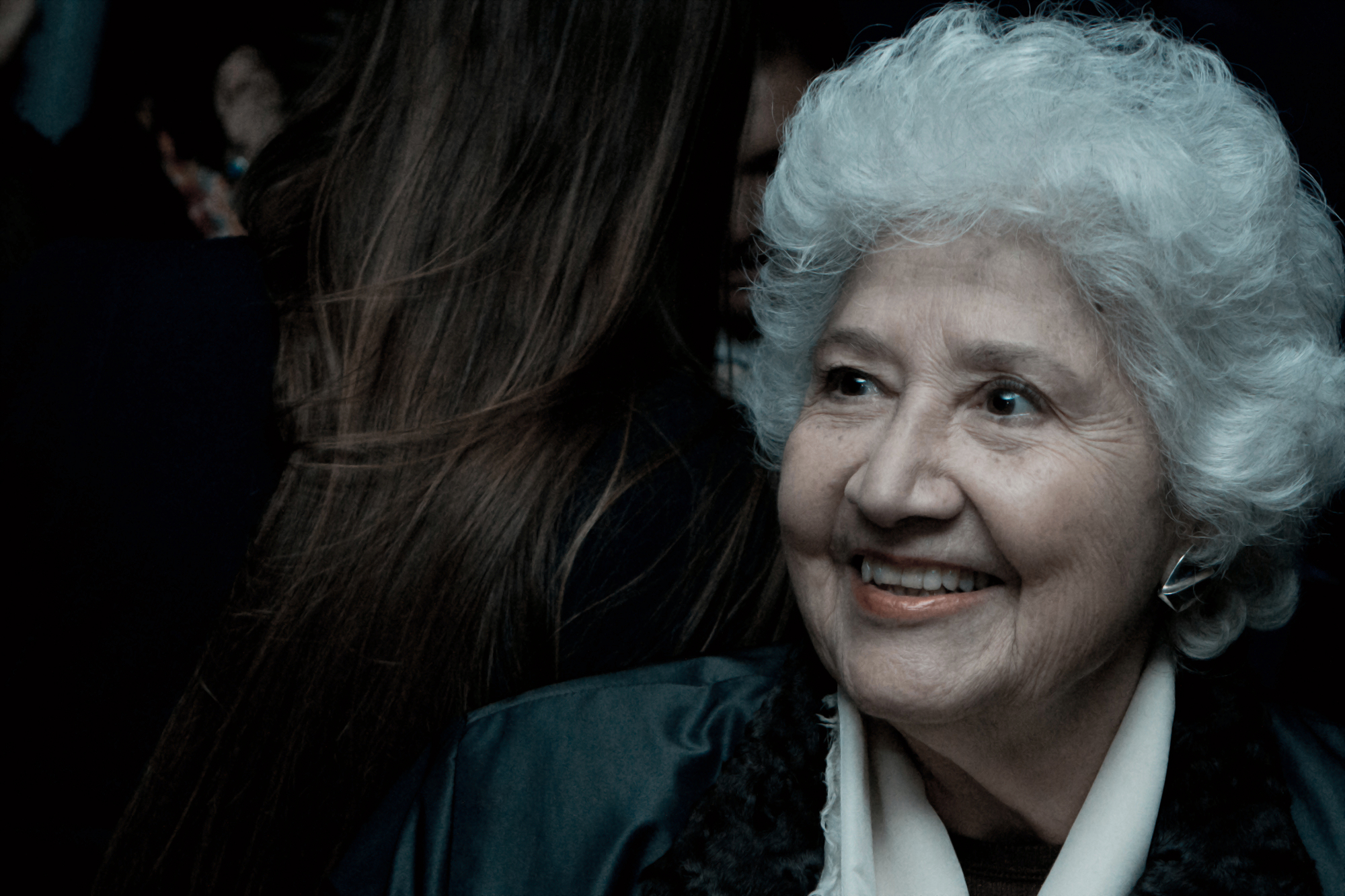
Photographer Sara Facio

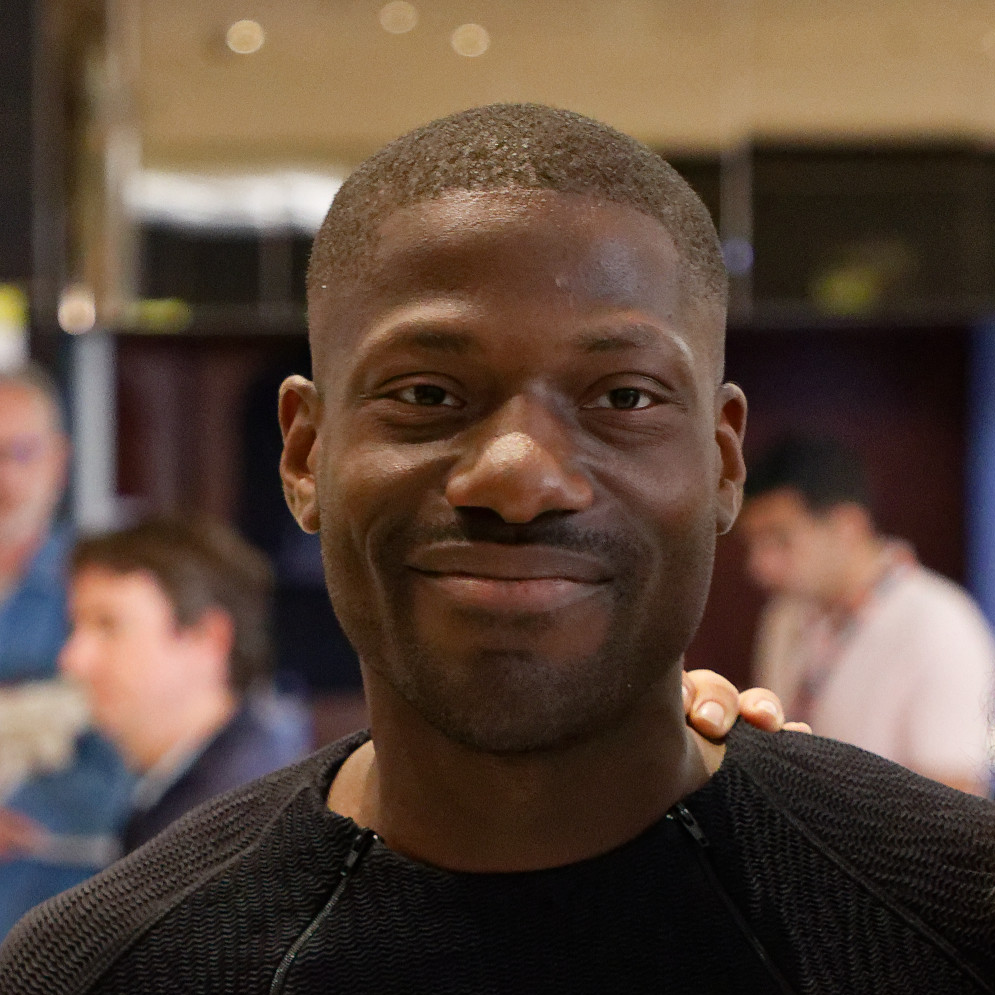
Actor Erwan Kepoa Falé

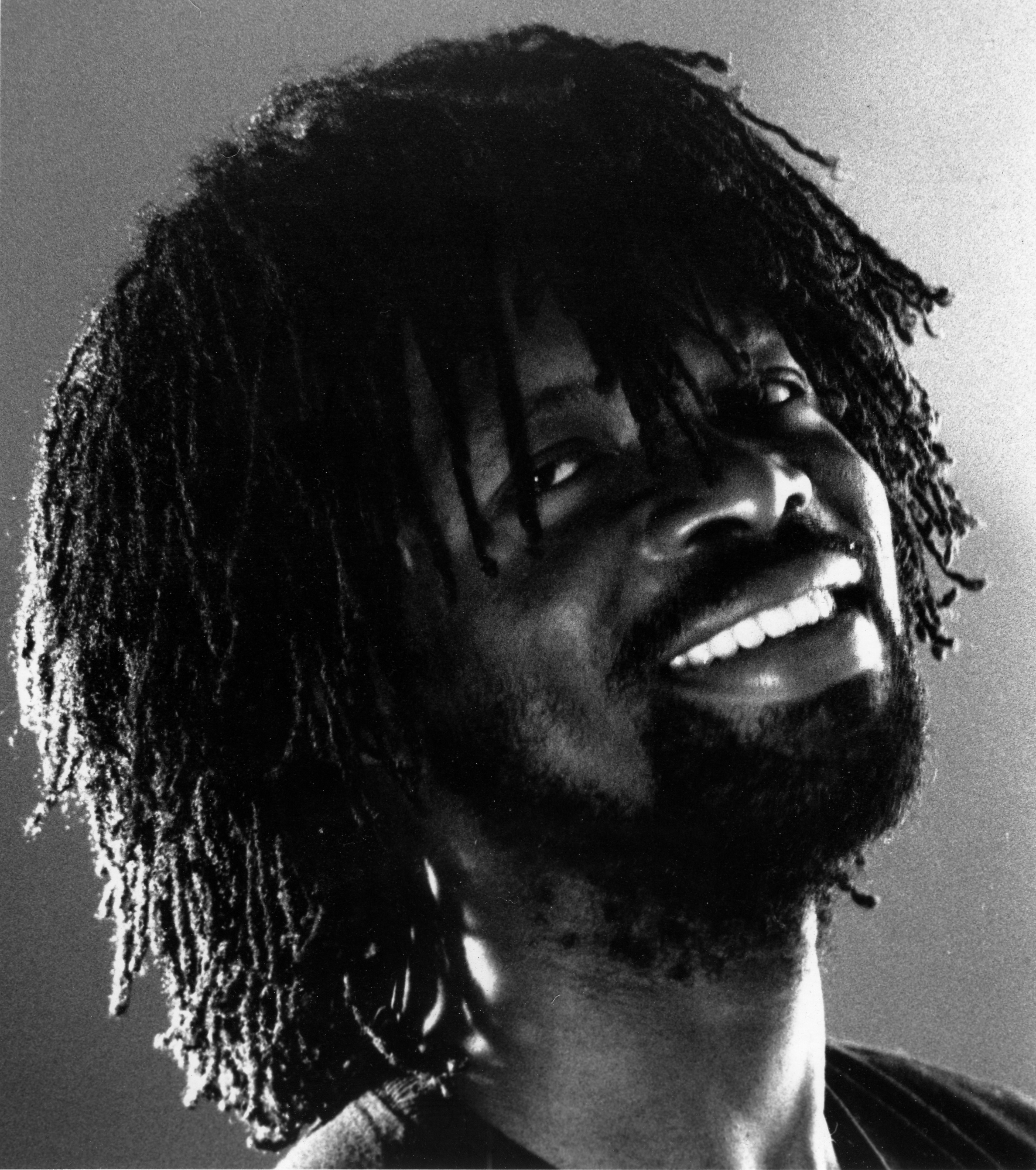
Photographer Rotimi Fani-Kayode

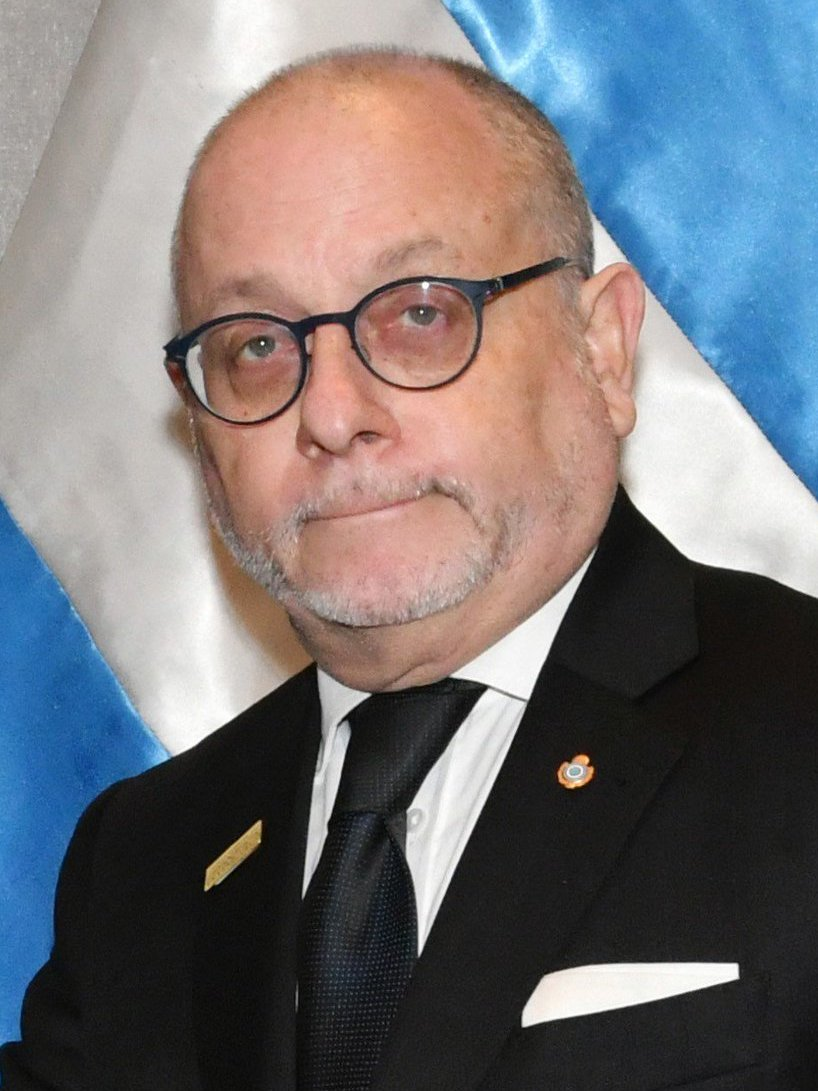
Politician Jorge Faurie

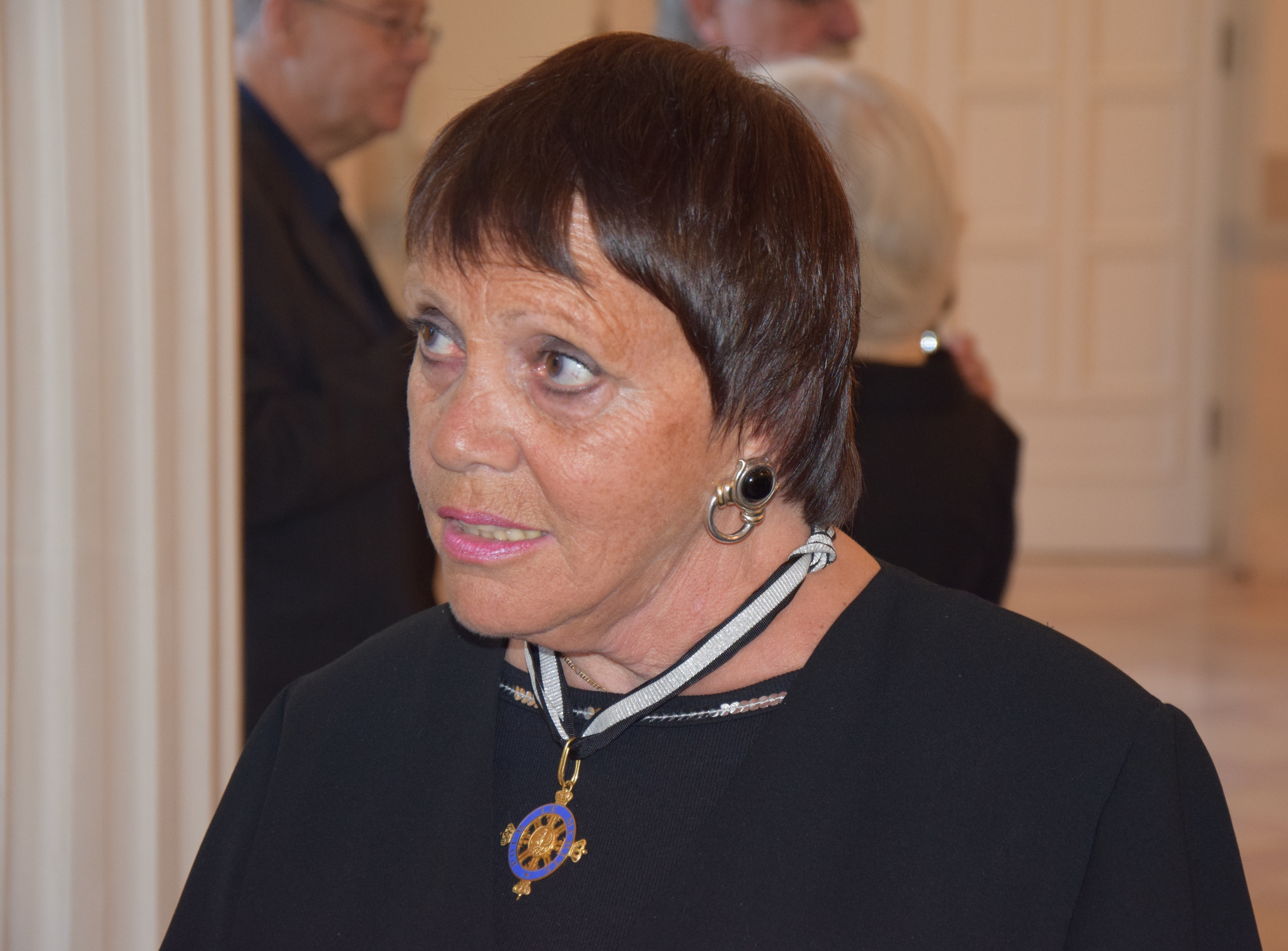
Opera singer Brigitte Fassbaender

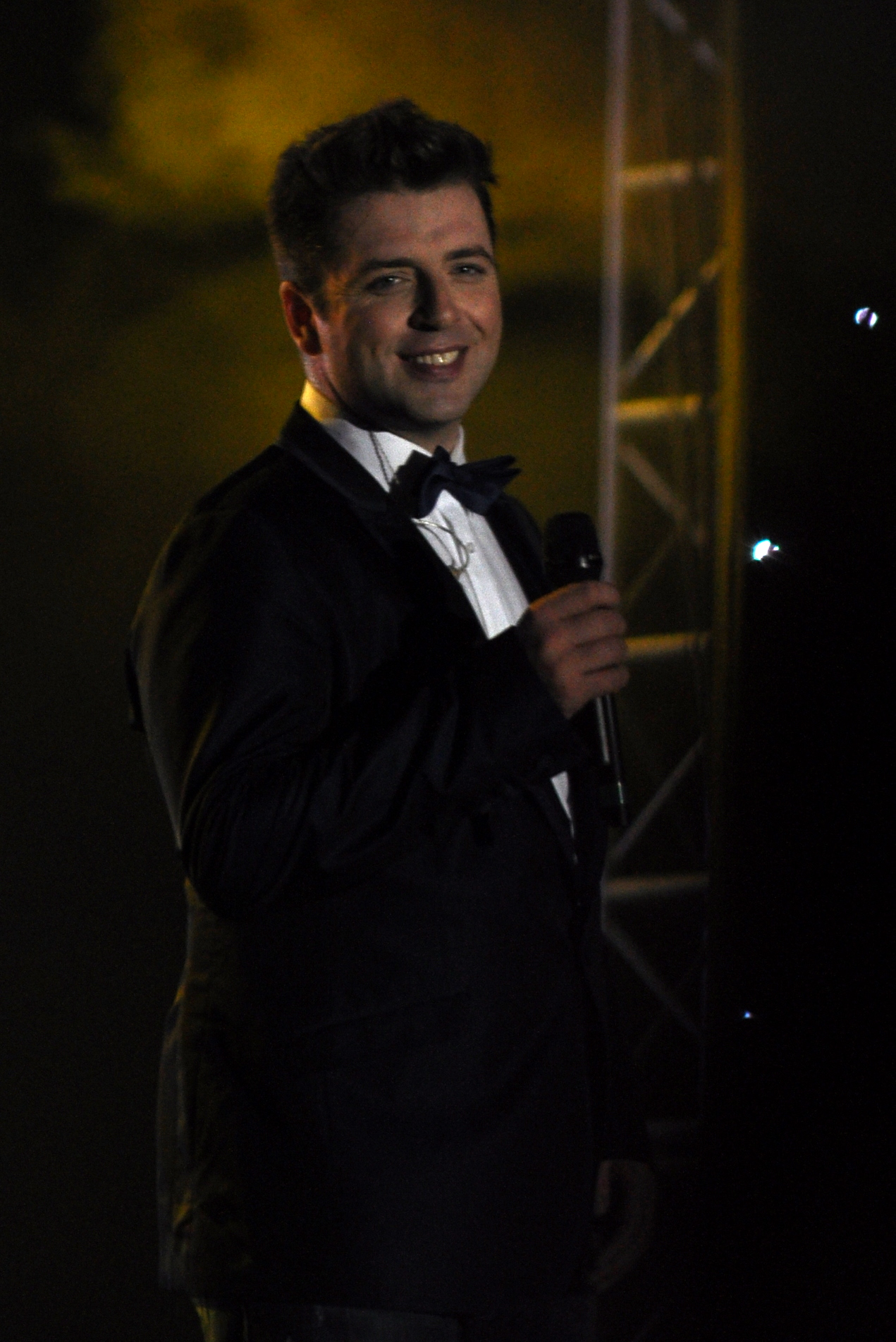
Singer Mark Feehily

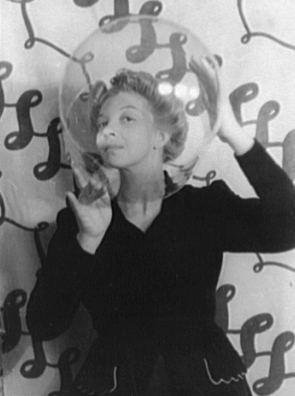
Surrealist painter Leonor Fini

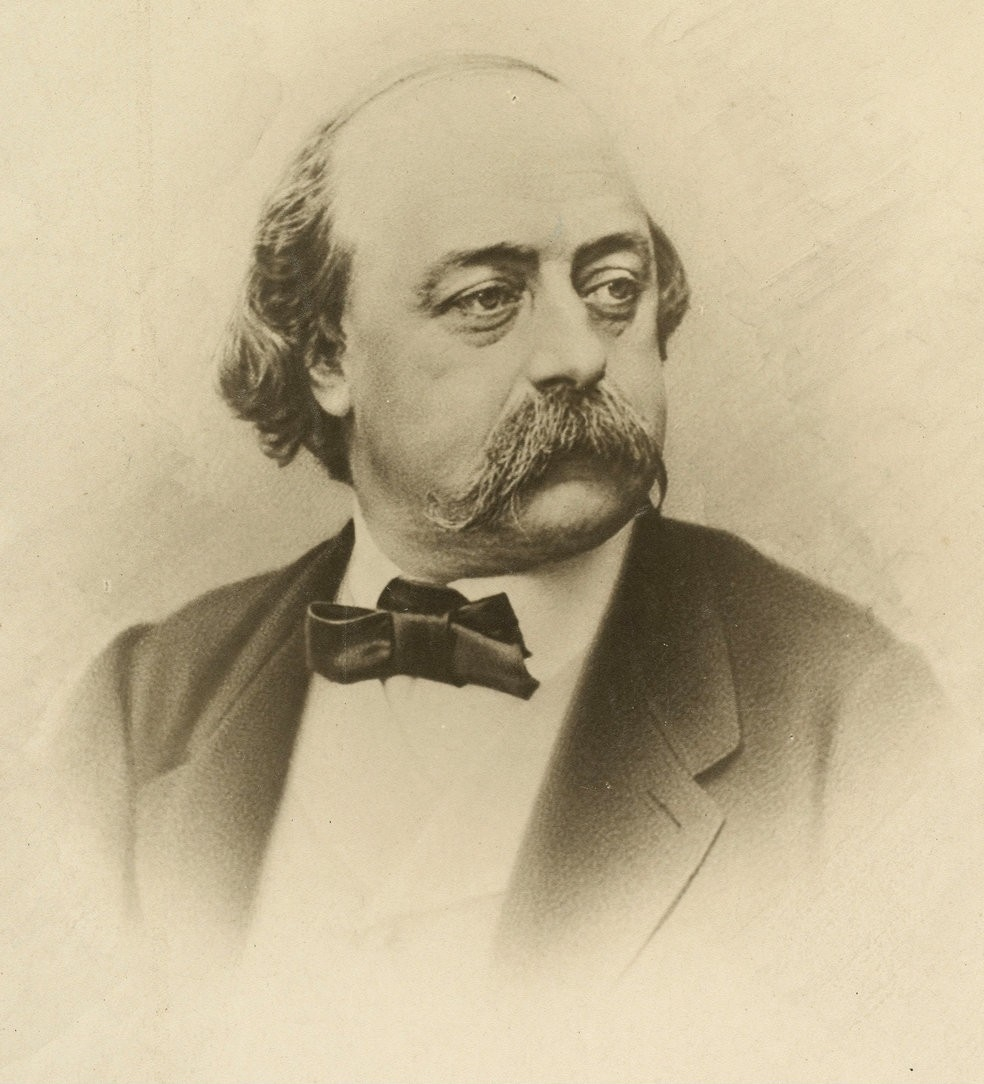
Novelist Gustave Flaubert

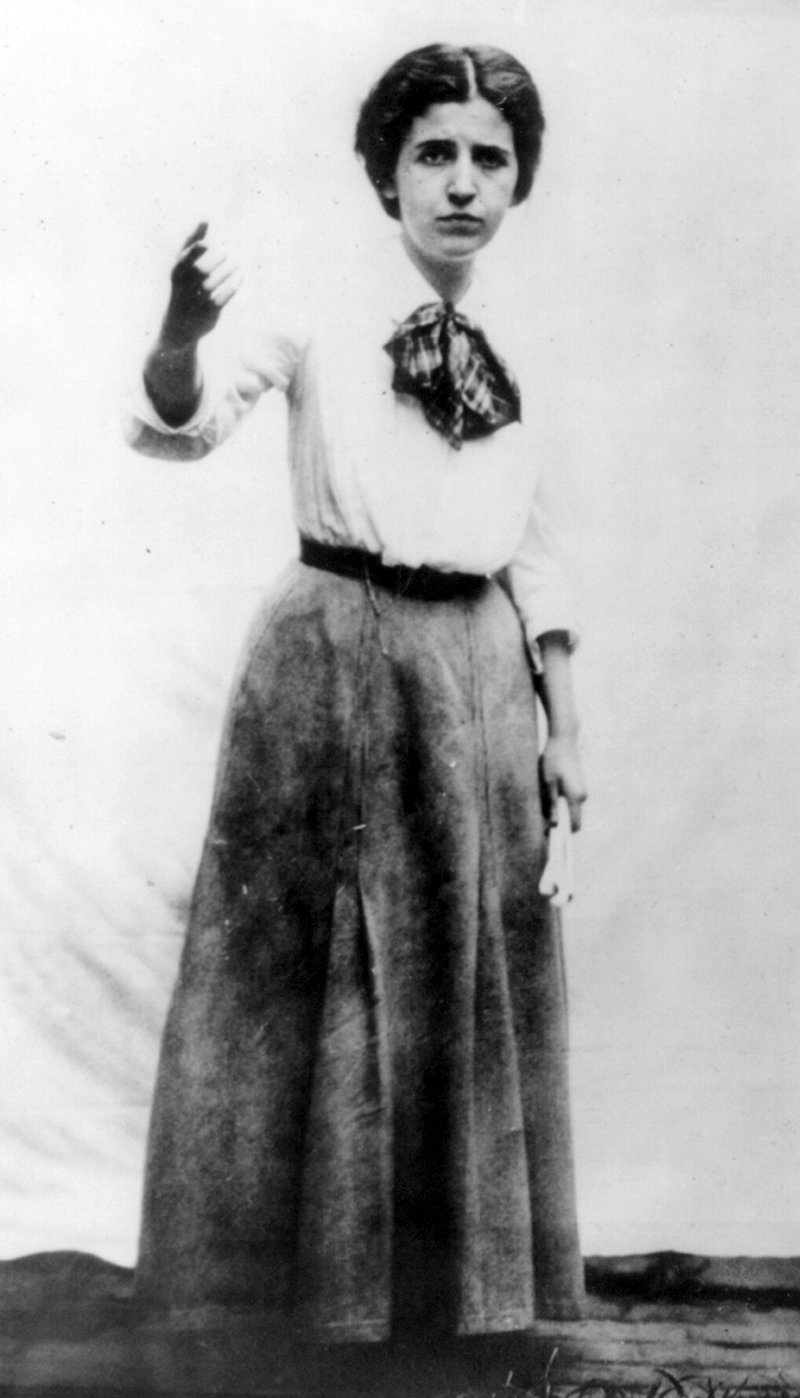
Labour activist Elizabeth Gurley Flynn

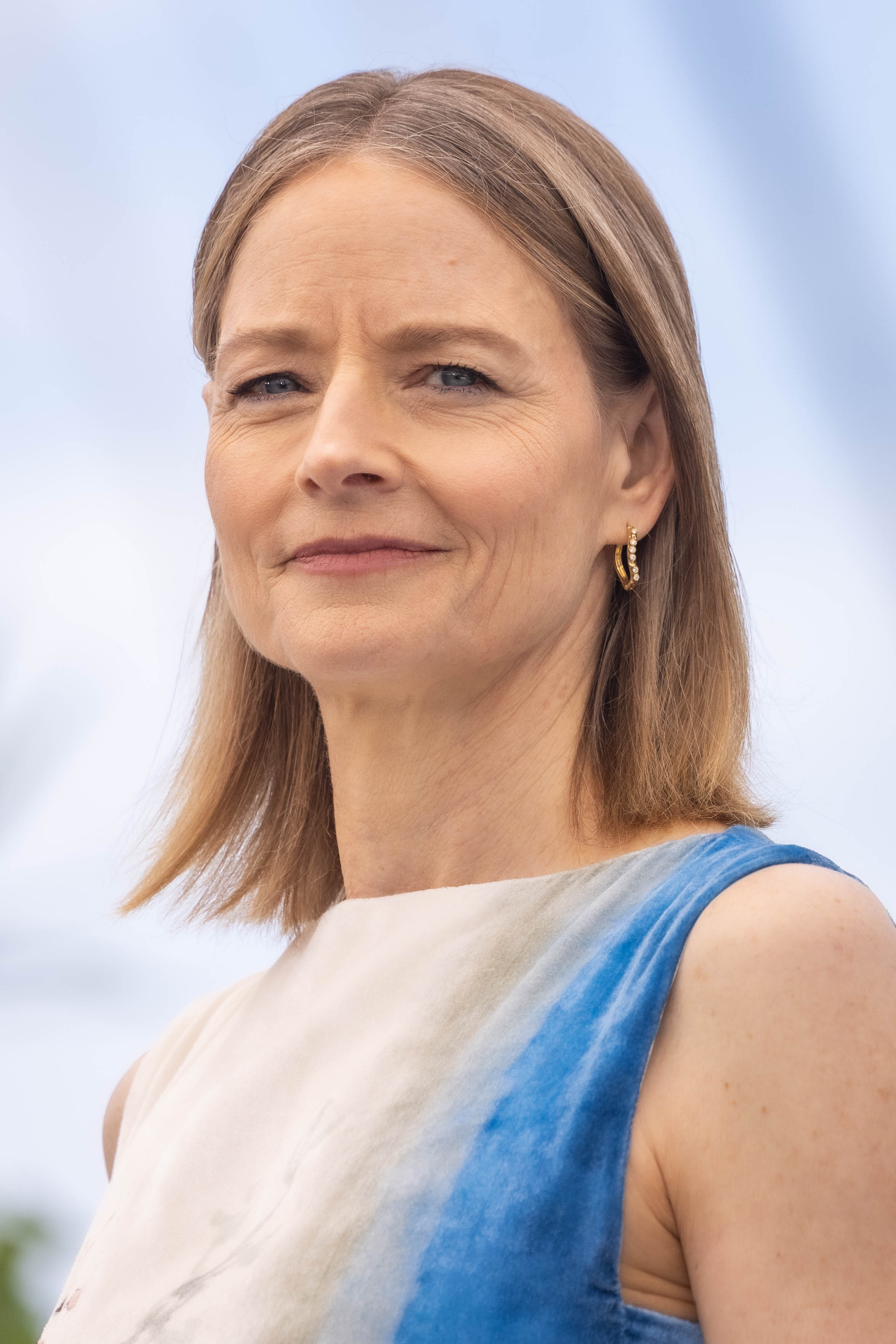
Actress Jodie Foster

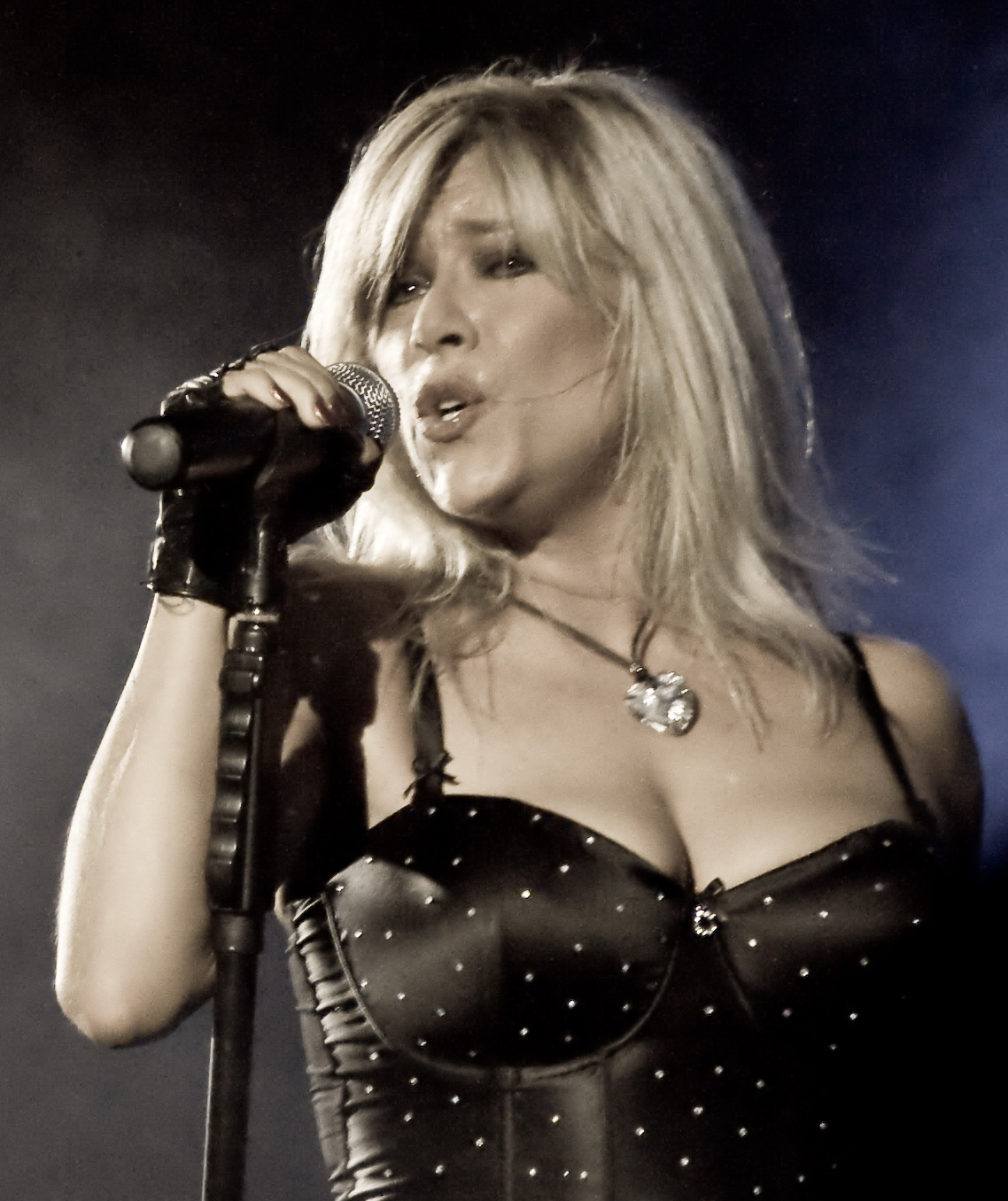
Model and pop musician Samantha Fox

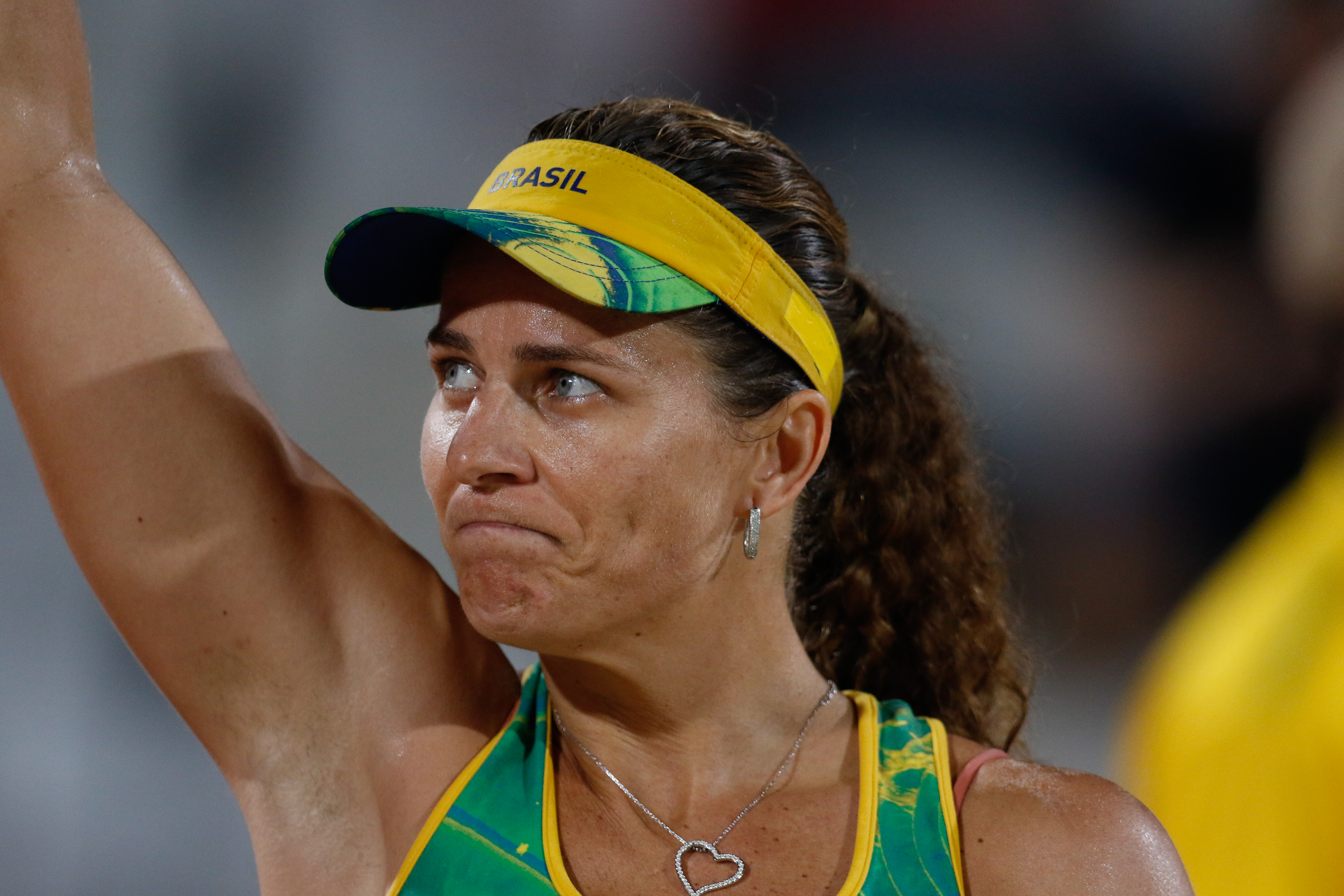
Beach volleyball player Larissa França

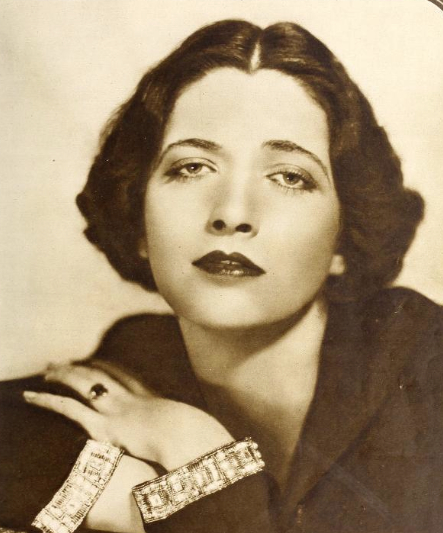
Actor Kay Francis

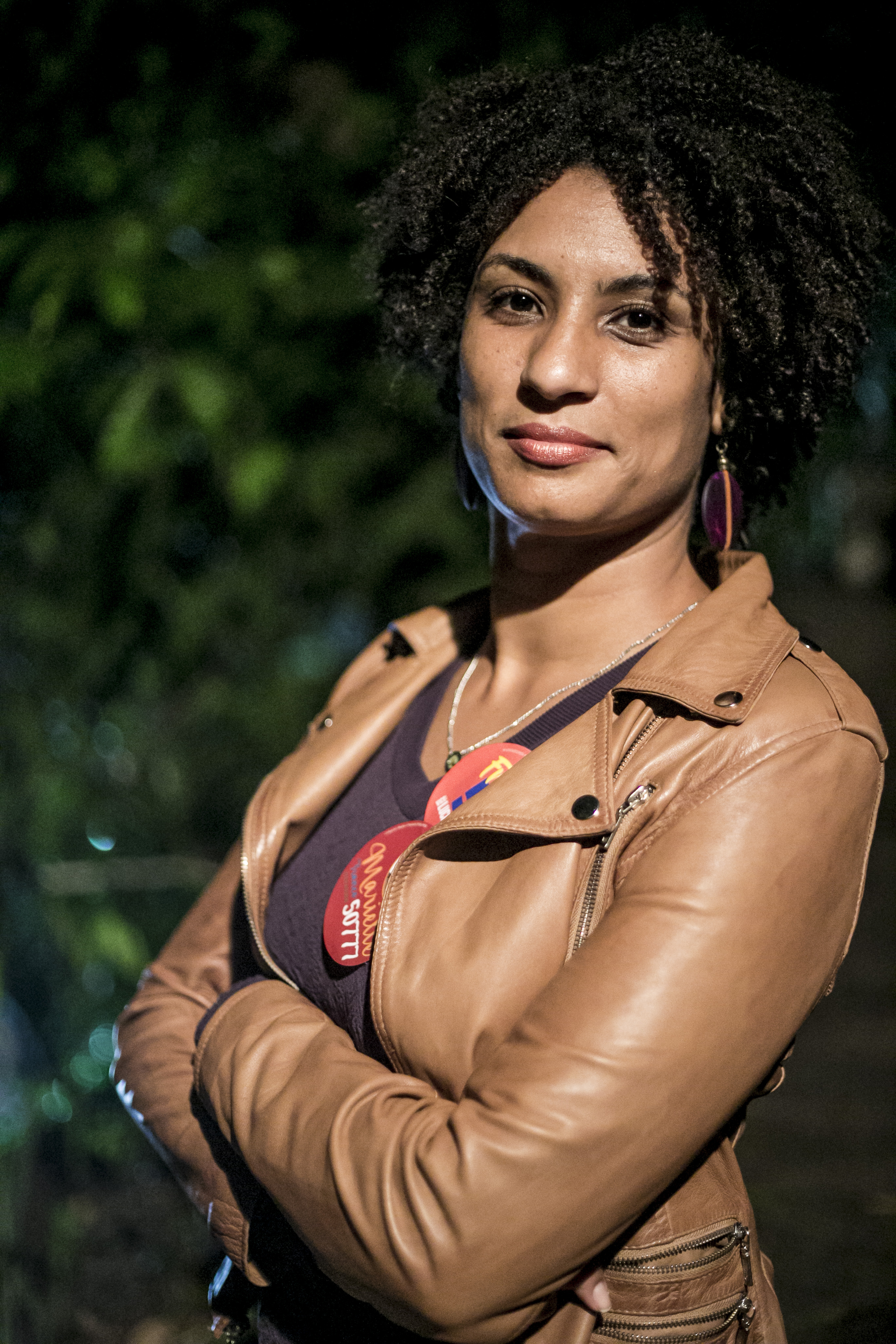
Politician, feminist, human rights activist Marielle Franco

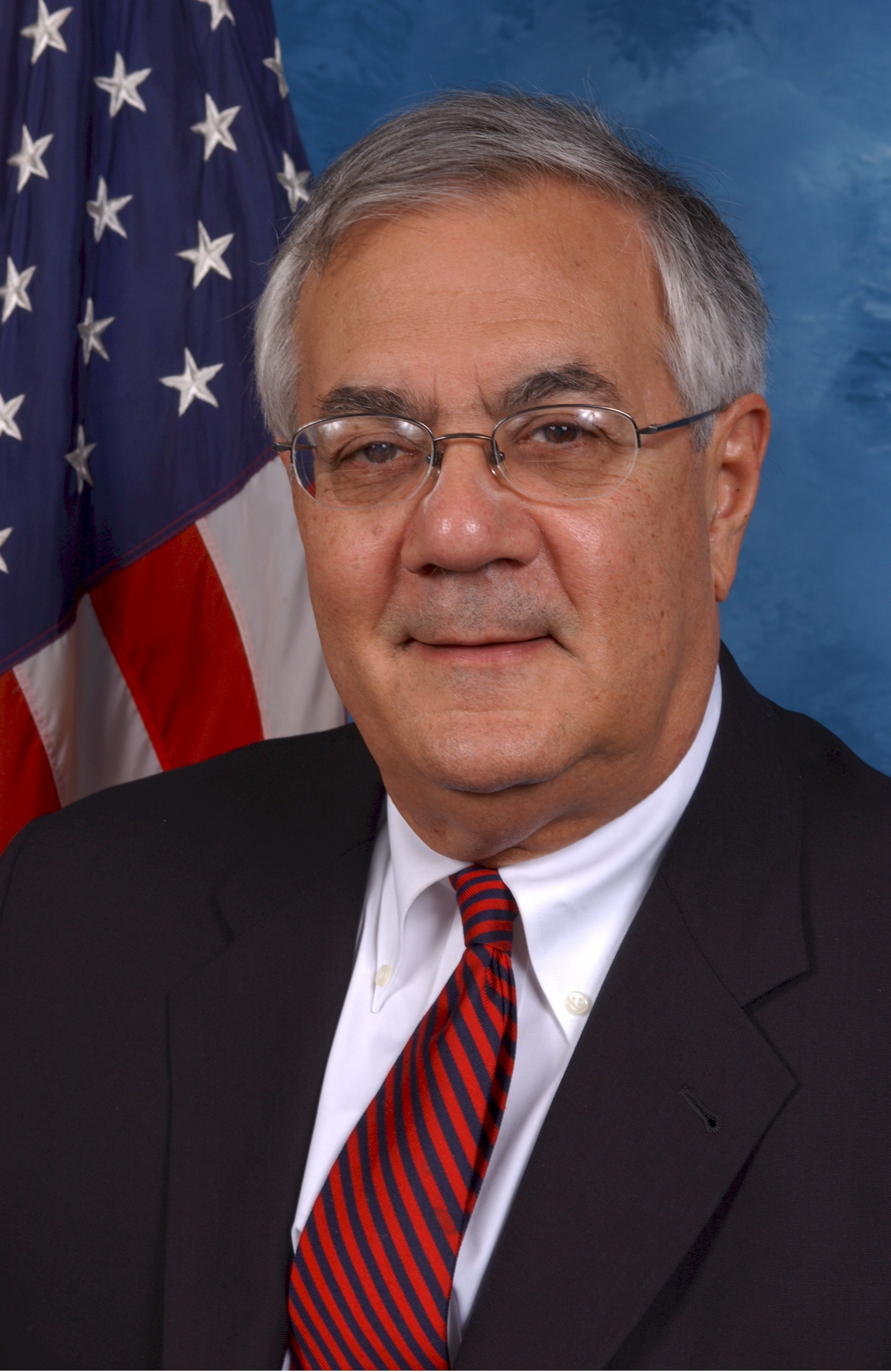
U.S. Representative Barney Frank

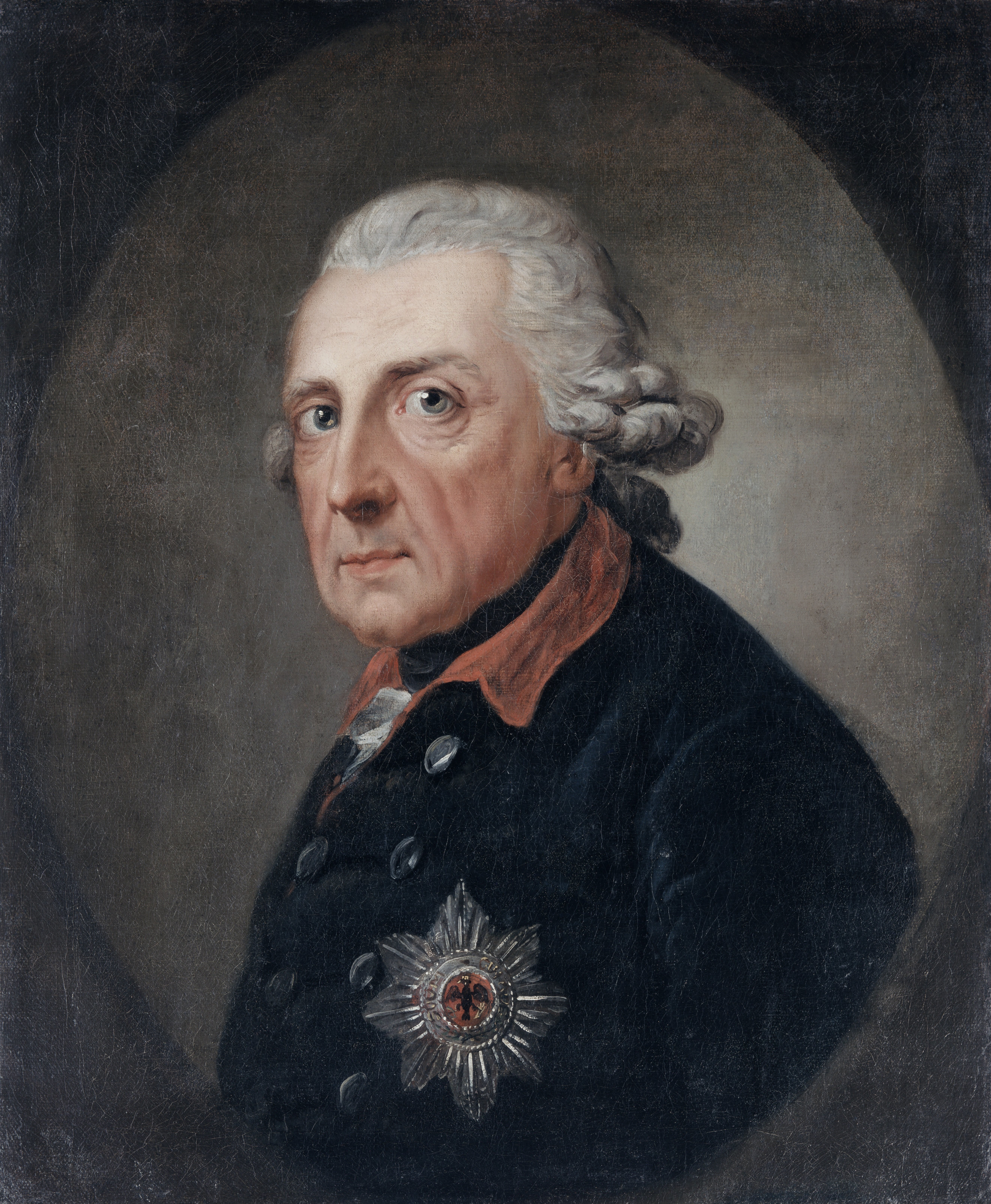
King of Prussia Frederick II

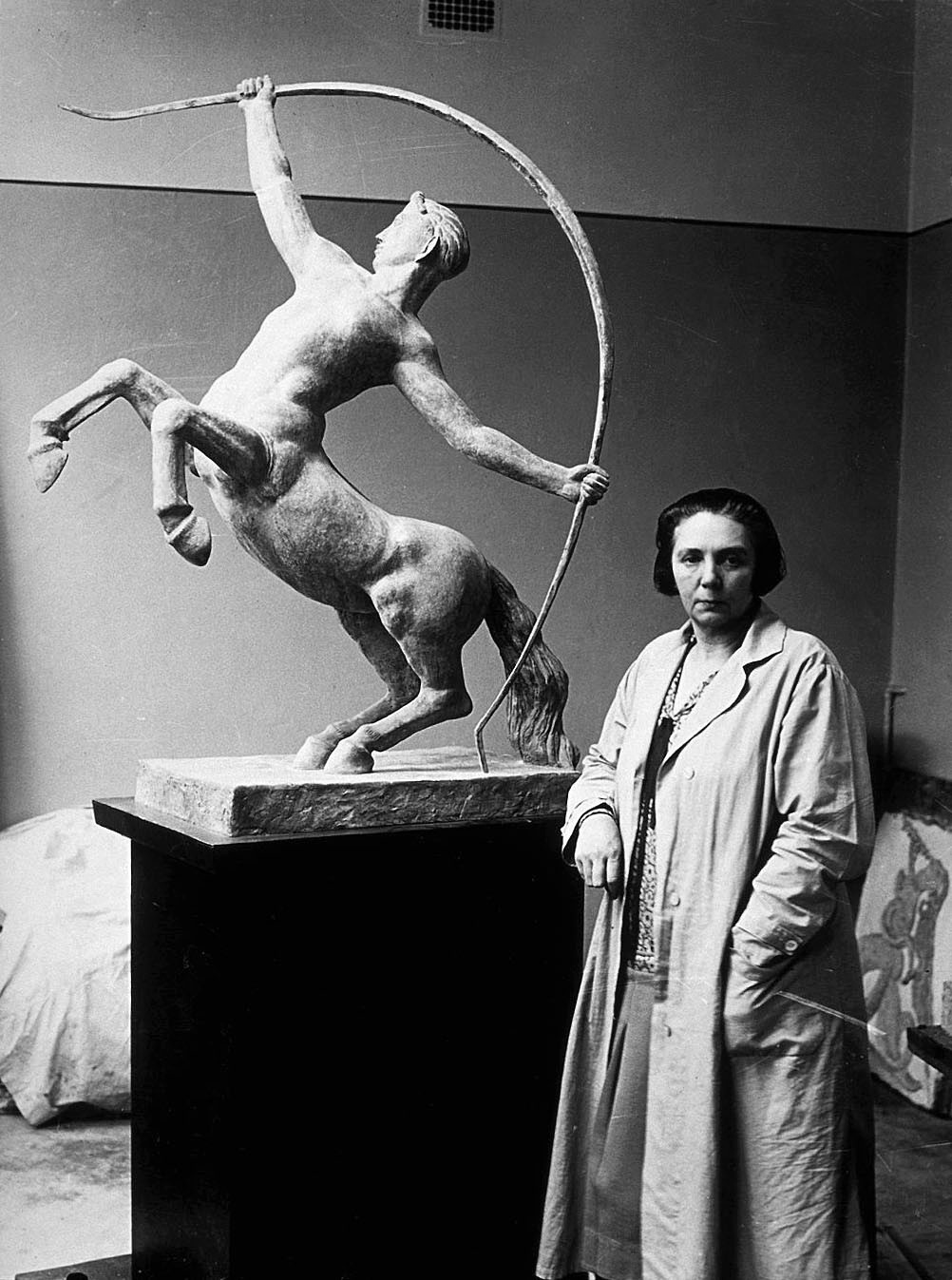
Sculptor Sigrid Fridman

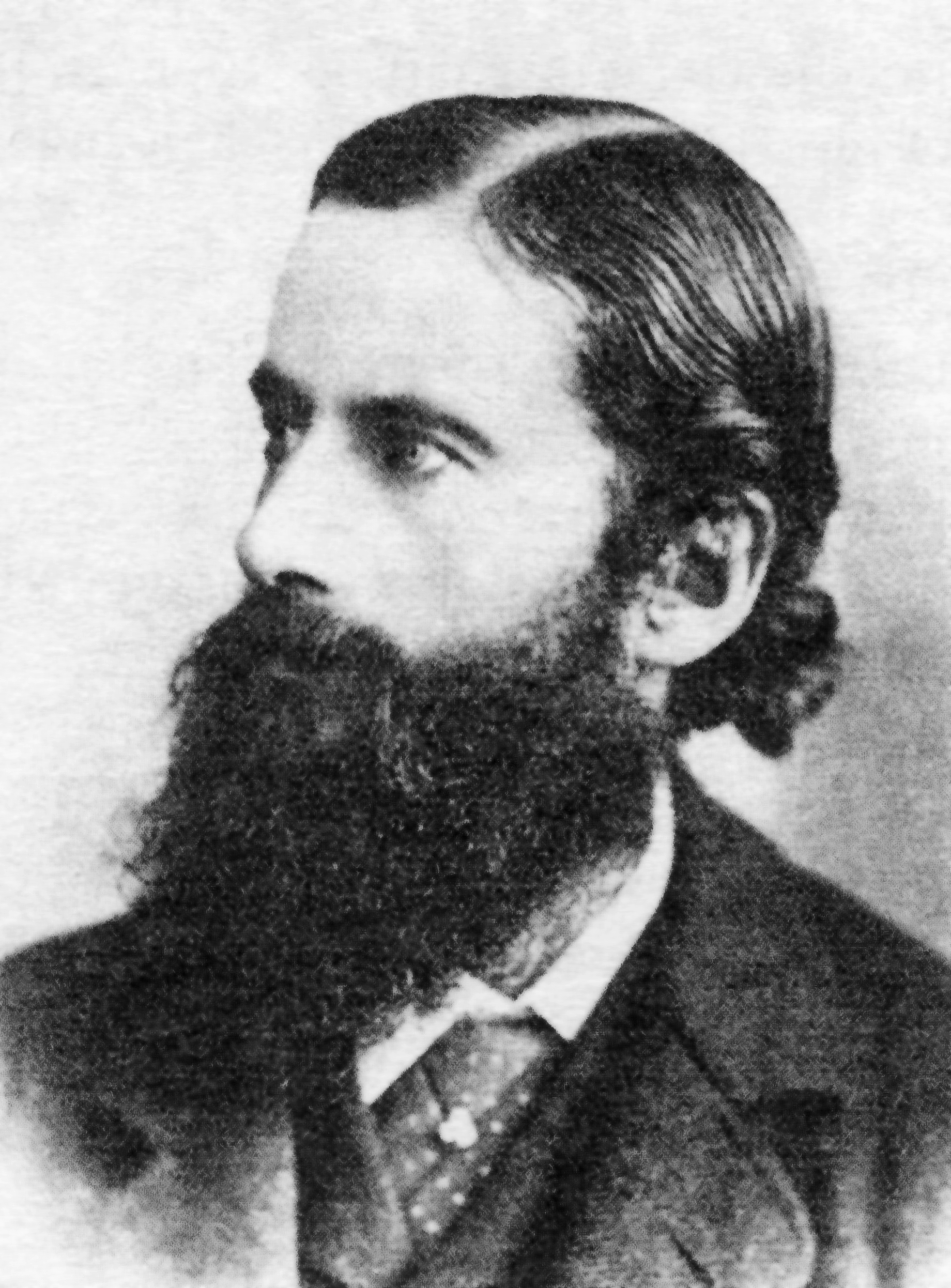
Sexologist, sociologist, economist, volcanologist, and physicist Benedict Friedlaender

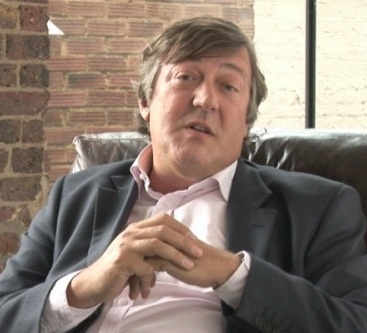
Actor and novelist Stephen Fry

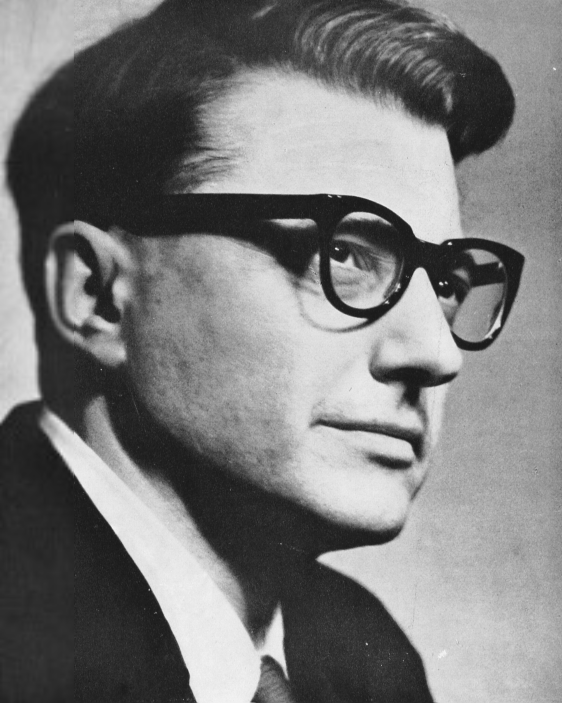
Novelist Ladislav Fuks

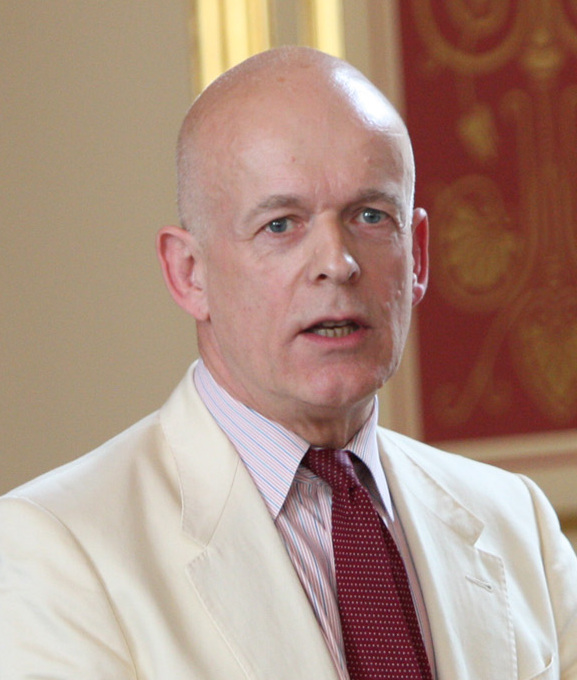
Judge Adrian Fulford

Name	Lifetime	Nationality	Notable as	Notes
Michael Fabiano	b. 1984	American	Opera tenor	G
Sara Facio	b. 1932	Argentine	Photographer	L
Lillian Faderman	b. 1940	American	Writer, educator	L
Kate Fagan	b. 1981	American	Sports reporter, commentator	L
Richard Fairbrass	b. 1953	English	Pop musician (Right Said Fred)	B
Tiffani Faison	b. 1977	American	Chef, reality show contestant	B
Marianne Faithfull	1946–2025	English	Singer, actor	B
Erwan Kepoa Falé	b. 1991 or 1992	French	Actor	G
Falete	b. 1978	Spanish	Flamenco/copla singer	G
Evan Fallenberg	b. 1961	American-Israeli	Writer	G
Peter Fallico	b. ?	Canadian	Interior designer, TV personality	G
György Faludy	1910-2006	Hungarian	Poet, writer, translator	B
Jane Fancher	b. 1952	American	Writer	L
Rotimi Fani-Kayode	1955–1989	Nigerian	Photographer	G
Eric Fanning	b. 1968	American	President and CEO of Aerospace Industries Association and former United States Secretary of the Army	G
Simon Fanshawe	b. 1956	English	Writer, broadcaster, cofounder of the Stonewall charity	G
Nicole Faraday	b. 1976	German-British	Actor	B
Janelly Farías	b. 1990	American-Mexican	Footballer	L
Morgan Farley	1898–1988	American	Actor	G
Gareth Farr	b. 1968	New Zealand	Contemporary classical composer, drag performer	G
James Farrell	b. ?	British	TV producer	G
David Farrier	b. 1982	New Zealand	Journalist, director, actor	G
Fereydoun Farrokhzad	1938–1992	Iranian	Singer, actor, poet, writer, dissident	G
Jane Farrow	b. 1961	Canadian	Writer, broadcaster	L
Ronan Farrow	b. 1987	American	Journalist, human rights activist	B
Daniel Farson	1927–1997	English	Writer, broadcaster	G
Charles Farthing	1953–2014	New Zealand	Physician	G
Justin Fashanu	1961–1998	British	Footballer	G
Brigitte Fassbaender	b. 1939	German	Opera singer	L
Rainer Werner Fassbinder	1945–1982	German	Film director	G
Kaffe Fassett	b. 1937	American	Artist	G
Brenda Fassie	1964–2004	South African	Pop musician	B
Simone Fattal	b. 1942	Lebanese-American	Artist	L
Freda du Faur	1882–1935	Australian	Mountaineer	L
Jorge Faurie	b. 1951	Argentine	Politician	G
Anne Fausto-Sterling	b. 1944	American	Sexologist	L
Frances Faye	1912–1991	American	Cabaret musician	B
Enderûnlu Fâzıl	1757–1810	Ottoman	Poet	G
Melissa Febos	b. ?	American	Writer	B
Ryan Fecteau	b. 1992	American	Politician and current Assistant Majority Leader of the Maine House of Representatives	G
Tim Federle	b. 1980	American	Author, theater librettist, director, screenwriter	G
Fredrick Federley	b. 1978	Swedish	Politician	G
Fra Fee	b. 1987	Northern Irish	Actor, singer	G
Mark Feehily	b. 1980	Irish	Pop musician (Westlife)	G
Payam Feili	b. 1985	Iranian	Poet	G
Fortune Feimster	b. 1980	American	Comedian	L
Paul Feinman	1960–2021	American	Judge of the New York Court of Appeals	G
Chai Feldblum	b. 1959	American	Author and 1st openly LGBT person to serve on the EEOC	L
Beanie Feldstein	b. 1993	American	Actor	L
Anselmo Feleppa	1956–1993	Brazilian	Fashion designer	G
Diane Felix	b. 1953	American	Disc jockey, LGBT activist	L
Antonio A. Feliz	b. ?	American	Clergy	G
Art Feltman	b. 1958	American	Politician	G
Luis Fenero	b. 1992	Spanish	Ice dancer	G
Susan Feniger	b. ?	American	Chef, restaurateur, cookbook author, radio and TV personality	L
John Fennell	b. 1995	Canadian	Luger	G
Steen Fenrich	1981–1999	American	Teenager murdered by his stepfather	G
James Fenton	b. 1949	English	Writer, academic	G
Kevin Fenton	b. 1966	Scottish	Physician, epidemiologist	G
Ferdinand I of Bulgaria	1861–1948	Bulgarian	King	B
Christine Ferea	b. 1982	American	Boxer	L
Fergie	b. 1975	American	Singer, model, fashion designer	B
Jesse Tyler Ferguson	b. 1975	American	Actor	G
Jim Ferlo	b. 1951	American	Politician; 1st openly gay legislator in the Pennsylvania Senate	G
Ainhoa Fernández	b. 1994	Andorran	Footballer	L
Dominique Fernandez	b. 1929	French	Writer, academic	G
Gigi Fernández	b. 1964	American	Tennis player	L
Lynne Fernie	b. 1946	Canadian	Filmmaker	L
Franck Ferrand	b. 1967	French	Writer, radio presenter	G
Mark Ferrandino	b. 1977	American	Fiscal analyst, politician	G
Fabiano Ferreira	b. 1998	Brazilian	Swimmer	G
Frank Ferri	b. 1954	American	Politician	G
Melissa Ferrick	b. 1970	American	Rock musician	B
Michelle Ferris	b. 1976	Australian	Olympic cyclist	L
Robert Ferro	1941–1988	American	Writer	G
Tiziano Ferro	b. 1980	Italian	Pop singer	G
Ferron	b. 1952	Canadian	Musician	L
Ali Feruz	b. ?	Uzbek-Russian	Journalist, gay rights activist	G
Hubert Fichte	1935–1986	German	Writer	G
Edward Field	1924–2026	American	Poet	G
Patricia Field	b. 1941	American	Costume designer, stylist	L
Danny Fields	b. 1941	American	Journalist, promoter, author	G
Harvey Fierstein	b. 1952	American	Actor	G
Joseph Fiévée	1767–1839	French	Journalist, novelist, essayist, playwright, civil servant, secret agent	G
Thom Filicia	b. 1969	American	Interior designer	G
Izabela Filipiak	b. 1961	Polish	Writer	L
Timothy Findley	1930–2002	Canadian	Novelist, playwright	G
Leonor Fini	1907–1996	Argentine	Painter	B
Tom of Finland	1920–1991	Finnish	Artist	G
William Finn	1952–2025	American	Composer, lyricist	G
Ronald Firbank	1886–1926	English	Novelist	G
Jordan Firstman	b. 1991	American	Writer, producer, comedian	G
Siegfried Fischbacher	1939–2021	German-American	Magician, entertainer	G
Nilla Fischer	b. 1984	Swedish	Footballer	L
Jay Fisette	b. 1956	American	Politician and 1st openly gay official elected in Virginia	G
Leslie Fish	b. ?	American	Musician, author, political activist	B
Jeremy Fisher	b. 1954	New Zealand	Writer	G
Kendra Fisher	b. 1979	Canadian	Ice hockey goaltender	L
M. F. K. Fisher	1908–1992	American	Writer	B
Jess Fishlock	b. 1987	Welsh	Footballer, coach	L
Paul Fitzgerald	b. ?	American	Actor, director, writer	B
Thom Fitzgerald	b. 1968	American	Film director	G
Louise Fitzhugh	1928–1974	American	Writer, illustrator of children's books (e.g., Harriet the Spy series)	L
Joe FitzPatrick	b. 1967	Scottish	Politician	G
William P. Fitzpatrick	b. ?	American	Politician	G
Tori Fixx	b. ?	American	Hip-hop artist, producer	G
Fannie Flagg	b. 1944	American	Author, actor	L
Rosanna Flamer-Caldera	b. 1956	Sri Lankan	Activist	L
Bill Flanagan	b. 1960	Canadian	Academic	G
Ed Flanagan	b. 1950	American	Politician	G
Maile Flanagan	b. 1965	American	Actor	L
Susan Flannery	b. 1939	American	Actor, director	L
Gustave Flaubert	1821–1880	French	Author	B
John Fleck	b. 1951	American	Actor, performance artist	G
Mike Fleck	b. 1973	American	Politician	G
Andrew Fleming	b. 1963	American	Film director, screenwriter	G
Kate Fleming	1965–2006	American	Audiobook narrator and producer	L
Dino Fetscher	b. 1988	Welsh	Actor	G
Peter Flinsch	1920–2010	German-Canadian	Artist, TV set designer	G
Joseph Flores	1907–1974	Maltese	Judge, politician	G
Nexar Antonio Flores	b. 1978	Ecuadorian-Finnish	Fashion stylist, makeup artist	G
Valeria Flores	b. 1973	Argentine	Writer, academic, queer theorist, feminist, activist	L
Nina Flowers	b. 1974	Puerto Rican	Drag queen, reality TV personality	G
Paul Flowers	b. 1950	English	Banker	G
Wayland Flowers	1939–1988	American	Puppeteer, comedian	G
Gary Floyd	b. 1953	American	Singer (The Dicks)	G
Kay Floyd	b. ?	American	Politician	L
Armand de Fluvià	1931–2024	Spanish	Genealogist, heraldist	G
Brandon Flynn	b. 1993	American	Actor	G.
Declan Flynn	1951–1982	Irish	Murder victim	G
Elizabeth Gurley Flynn	1890–1964	American	Activist	B
Althea Flynt	1953–1987	American	Publisher, wife of Larry Flynt	B
Barrett Foa	b. 1977	American	Actor	G
Waawaate Fobister	b. 1984	Canadian	Writer, actor	G
Júlio Fogaça	1907–1980	Portuguese	Politician	G
Mark Foley	b. 1954	American	U.S. Representative (R-FL)	G
Miya Folick	b. 1989	American	Singer-songwriter	L
Ulrike Folkerts	b. 1961	German	Actor	L
Hector Fonseca	b. 1980	American	DJ	G
Graça Fonseca	b. 1971	Portuguese	Politician	L
Amini Fonua	b. 1989	Tongan	Swimmer	G
Paul Foot	b. 1973	English	Comedian	G
Malcolm Forbes	1919–1990	American	Magazine publisher	B
Vivian Forbes	1891–1937	English	Soldier, painter, poet	G
Charles Henri Ford	1908–2002	American	Poet, novelist, photographer, artist	B
Clementine Ford	b. 1979	American	Actor	B
Constance Ford	1923–1993	American	Actor, model	L
Gia Ford	b. 1996	English	Singer-songwriter	L
Katie Ford	b. ?	American-Canadian	Film and TV writer	L
Michael Thomas Ford	b. 1968	American	Writer	G
Tom Ford	b. 1962	American	Fashion designer and film director	G
Matthew Forgues	b. 1992	American	Racewalker	G
Nicola Formichetti	b. 1977	Japanese-Italian	Fashion designer	G
María Irene Fornés	1930–2018	Cuban-American	Playwright	L
Selena Forrest	b. 1999	American	Fashion model	B
E. M. Forster	1879–1970	English	Writer	G
Jackie Forster	1926–1998	English	Actor, activist	L
Ricardo Fort	1968–2013	Argentine	Socialite, entrepreneur, TV director	B
Stormie Forte	b. ?	American	Lawyer, politician	L
Wolfgang Fortner	1907–1987	German	Classical composer and conductor	G
Elena Fortún	1886–1952	Spanish	Children's author	B
Pim Fortuyn	1948–2002	Dutch	Politician, academic and sociologist	G
Anthony Forwood	1915–1988	English	Actor	G
Per-Kristian Foss	b. 1950	Norwegian	Politician, first openly gay minister in Norway	G
Rose Fostanes	b. 1967	Filipino	Singer	L
Jim Foster	1934–1990	American	LGBT rights and political activist	G
Jodie Foster	b. 1962	American	Actor	L
John Foster	b. ?	English	Pop musician (Bronski Beat)	G
Mark Foster	b. 1970	English	Swimmer	G
Quentin Fottrell	b. 1975	Irish	Writer	G
Michel Foucault	1926–1984	French	Philosopher, historian	B
Cristo Foufas	b. ?	British	Radio presenter	G
Kim Fountain	b. 1968	American	LGBT activist, businesswoman	L
Vincent Fourcade	1934–1992	French	Interior designer	G
Caroline Fourest	b. 1975	French	Writer, journalist, documentary filmmaker, radio presenter	L
Denham Fouts	1914–1948	American	Prostitute, socialite	G
John Fowler	b. 1954	Australian	Politician	G
Simon Fowler	b. 1965	English	Rock musician (Ocean Colour Scene)	G
Eytan Fox	b. 1964	Israeli	Film director	G
Gordon D. Fox	b. 1961	American	Politician	G
Greg Fox	b. 1961	American	Cartoonist	G
Julia Fox	b. 1990	Italian–American	Actor	L
Megan Fox	b. 1986	American	Model, actor	B
Samantha Fox	b. 1966	English	Pop musician, model	L
Virgil Fox	1912–1980	American	Classical musician	G
Isabel Franc	b. 1955	Spanish	Writer	L
Larissa França	b. 1982	Brazilian	Beach volleyball player	L
Tan France	b. 1983	English	Fashion designer, TV personality	G
David France	b. ?	American	Journalist, filmmaker	G
Adrianna Franch	b. 1990	American	Soccer player	L
Brian Francis	b. 1971	Canadian	Novelist	G
Samuel Kensinger Francis	b. 1974	American	Fitness journalist, trainer	G
Kay Francis	1905–1968	American	Actor	B
Horacio Franco	b. 1963	Mexican	Musician	G
Marielle Franco	1979-2018	Brazilian	Politician, human rights activist	B
DJ Keoki (Keoke Franconi)	b. 1966	Salvadoran-American	Electronic musician, DJ	G
Barney Frank	b. 1940	American	Politician	G
Larissa Franklin	b. 1993	Canadian	Softball player	L
Sidney Franklin	1903–1976	American	Matador	G
Connor Franta	b. 1992	American	YouTube personality	G
Scott Frantz	b. 1996	American	1st openly gay college football player to play in a game for an NCAA Division I Football Bowl Subdivision school	G
Daniel Franzese	b. 1978	American	Actor	G
Andy Fraser	1952–2015	English	Rock musician, bass guitarist (Free)	G
John Fraser	1931–2020	Scottish	Actor	G
Margo Frasier	b. ?	American	First openly lesbian sheriff elected to office	L
Louis Fratino	b. 1993	American	Artist	G
Peter Frechette	b. 1956	American	Actor	G
Frederick the Great	1712–1786	Prussian	Head of state	G
Sabrina Frederick	b. 1996	British-Australian	Australian rules footballer	L
Sawyer Fredericks	b. 1999	American	Singer-songwriter	B
Travon Free	b. 1985/1986	American	Comedian, actor, writer	B
Big Freedia	b. 1978	American	Musician	G
Marcia Freedman	1938–2021	American-Israeli	Activist	L
Alan Freeman	1927–2006	Australian	Radio DJ	B
Chris Freeman	b. 1961	American	Rock musician (Pansy Division)	G
Matilda Freeman	b. 2004	English	Actor	B
Mike Freer	b. 1960	English	Politician	G
Jared French	1905–1988	American	Painter	B
Kevin Fret	1994–2010	Puerto Rican	Latin trap musician	G
Gisèle Freund	1908–2001	German-French	Photographer, photojournalist	L
Casey Frey	b. ?	American	Dancer, comedian	B
Leonard Frey	1938–1988	American	Actor	G
Taylor Frey	b. 1986	American	Actor	G
Elsa von Freytag-Loringhoven	1874–1927	German-American	Artist, poet	B
Grace Frick	1903–1979	American	Translator	L
Aaron Fricke	b. 1962	American	Gay rights activist, author	G
Jonathan Frid	1924–2012	Canadian	Actor	G
Sigrid Fridman	1879–1963	Swedish	Sculptor	L
Benedict Friedländer	1866–1908	German	Early gay rights activist, author	G
Brian Friedman	b. 1977	American	Dancer	G
Prince Friedrich Heinrich Albrecht of Prussia	1874–1940	Prussian	Royal, military officer	G
Robert Friend	1913–1998	American-Israeli	Poet, translator	G
Matthias Frings	b. 1953	German	Journalist, TV presenter, writer	G
Lonnie Frisbee	1949–1993	American	Evangelist	G
Jack Fritscher	b. 1939	American	Author, university professor, historian, social activist	G
Pier Fritzsche	1976–2018	Argentine	Dancer, actor	G
Peter Frödin	b. 1964	Danish	Actor, singer, comedian	G
Stephen Fry	b. 1957	English	Actor, comedian, novelist	G
Marilyn Frye	b. 1941	American	Academic	L
Joe Fryer	b. 1977	American	Journalist	G
Amir Fryszer Guttman	1976–2017	Israeli	Singer, musician, choreographer, actor, theater director, LGBT rights activist	G
Rafael de la Fuente	b. 1986	Venezuelan	Actor, singer	G
Javier Fuentes-León	b. ?	Peruvian	Film director	G
Gloria Fuertes	1917–1998	Spanish	Poet, author	L
Alberto Fuguet	b. 1963	Chilean	Film director, writer	G
Tadd Fujikawa	b. 1991	American	Golfer	G
Michiyo Fukaya	1953–1987	American	Writer, activist	L
Ladislav Fuks	1923–1994	Czech	Writer	G
Adrian Fulford	b. 1953	English	Judge	G
Bryan Fuller	b. 1969	American	TV writer	G
Henry Blake Fuller	1857–1929	American	Dramatist	G
Janine Fuller	b. 1958	Canadian	Businessperson, writer	L
Loie Fuller	1862–1928	American	Dancer	G
Brenda Sue Fulton	b. ?	American	Military veteran	L
Richard Fung	b. 1954	Canadian	Video artist	G
Stephen Funk	b. 1982	American	Former U.S. Marine	G
Wes Funk	1969–2015	Canadian	Writer	G
David Furnish	b. 1962	Canadian	Filmmaker	G
Douglas Futuyma	b. 1942	American	Biologist	G
Patrick Fyffe	1942–2002	English	Actor, comedian	G

== See also ==
- List of gay, lesbian or bisexual people
