= Dawn Laguens =

American executive and activist (born 1964)

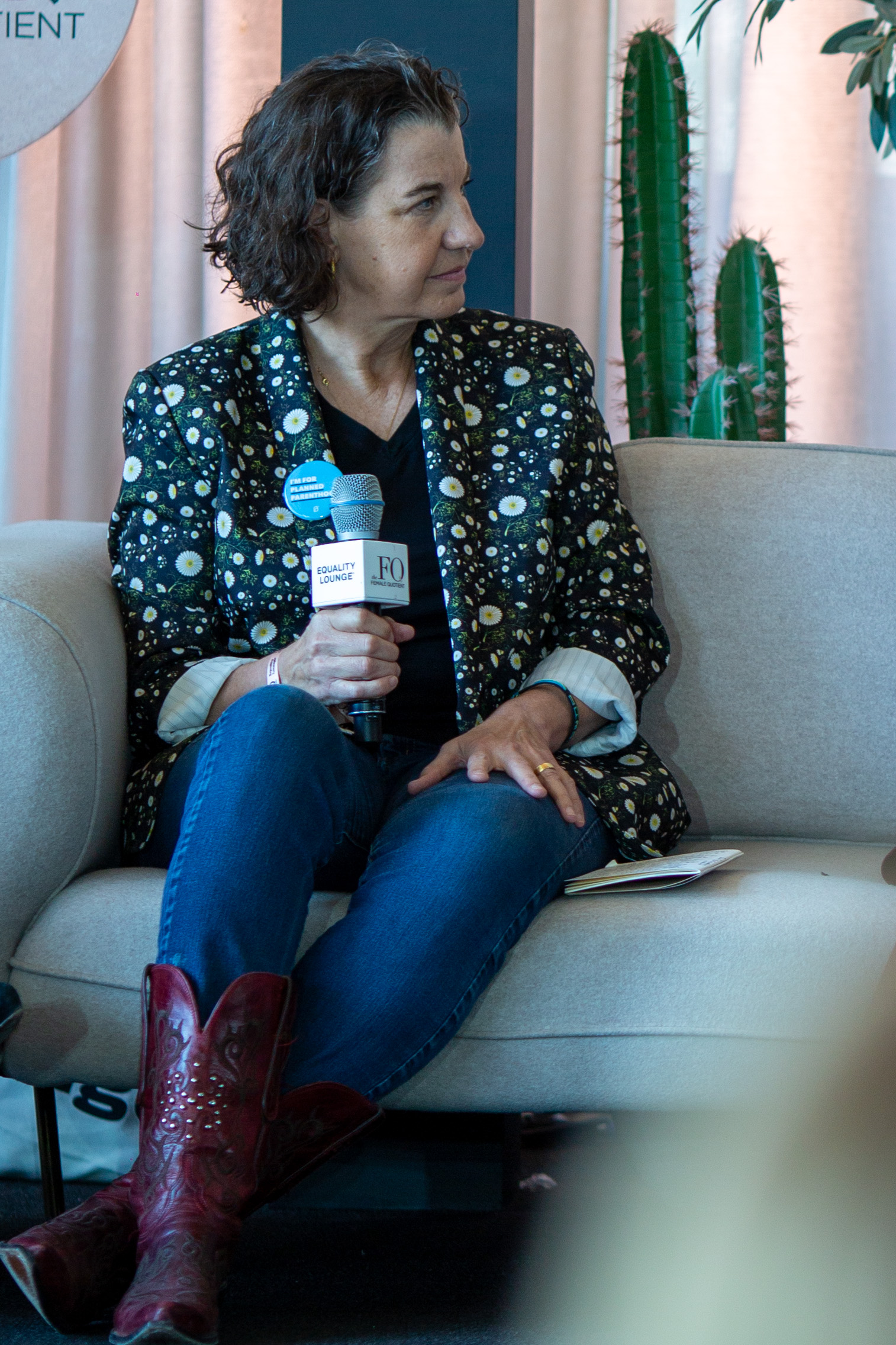
- Laguens in 2024.
- Born: 1964 (age 61–62); Louisiana
- Occupations: Executive, activist, writer, filmmaker

Dawn Laguens (born 1964) is the former executive vice president and chief brand officer of Planned Parenthood and the Planned Parenthood Action Fund. She is vice chair of LPAC, the LGBTQ+ social justice and women's equality super PAC. She is strategic advisor at Redshift Leadership and the Vaid Group. As of 2019, she is also the expert-in-residence at IDEO. Additionally, she is a writer and filmmaker, having served as executive producer of Across the Line, a virtual reality look at the personal experience of getting access to abortion, that debuted at Sundance in 2016. She has been published in Time, New York, the Anchorage Daily News, and on Refinery29, Medium, The Daily Beast, Salon.com, the podcast Queery, and other outlets. She has also appeared on CNN, NPR, CBS, and other media.

== Early life ==
Laguens grew up in a middle-class family in Louisiana. Lyndon B. Johnson happened to be at her baptism and held her briefly, a fact to which her family later jokingly attributed her Democratic affiliation. She has stated that she was "always pretty political" and "way more liberal than probably my whole family." Her early activism dates to when she was in third grade; she started a student council due to unfair playground rules that discriminated against the female pupils.

== Career ==
Laguens was mentored early on by Ron Chisholm of the anti-racist, multicultural organization People's Institute for Survival and Beyond and Sister Helen Prejean, the Roman Catholic nun who was a leading advocate for the abolition of the death penalty. During this time, Laguens helped run an organization while she learned on the job. She went on to manage the Louisiana Coalition Against Racism and Nazism's campaign against Klansman David Duke.

Through late 2010, Laguens ran a Democratic political consulting firm. She also served Planned Parenthood as a brand consultant for ten years before being recruited to serve full-time as executive vice president and chief brand officer, a post she took in January 2011. She remained with the organization through 2018. During her tenure, she led the organization through numerous programs and initiatives, such as resisting 21 Trump-Pence congressional attacks to defund Planned Parenthood; growing the organization from 2 million to 12 million members; helping develop a period tracker app for the organization; promoting and expanding access to birth control across 50 states; developing the Planned Parenthood Action Fund, the organization's political advocacy branch, and more.

After her departure from Planned Parenthood, Laguens became strategic advisor at Redshift Leadership and the Vaid Group and the expert-in-residence at IDEO.

Laguens has been a speaker at the Aspen Ideas Festival, Lesbians Who Tech, the BE Conference, and other events.

== Personal life ==
Laguens is married to Jennifer Treat. The couple has three daughters.

== Awards ==
- Boston University School of Public Health's Beyond Health Award (2018)
- Clio Award
