= Hawa Hassan =

Somali chef and author

- Born: 1985 or 1986 (age 40–41); Somalia
- Occupations: Author, chef
- Notable work: In Bibi’s Kitchen: The Recipes and Stories of Grandmothers from the Eight African Countries That Touch the Indian Ocean

Hawa Hassan is a Somali-American author and chef. Her first cookbook, In Bibi's Kitchen, won the 2022 James Beard Foundation award for Best International Cookbook.

== Early life and education ==
Hawa Ali Hassan was born in Mogadishu, Somalia, the second eldest of ten siblings; her early life was spent in Mogadishu. Her family fled the country in 1991 during the Somali Civil War when Hassan was four years old, going to a United Nations refugee camp in Mombasa, Kenya. Hassan was soon sent to Nairobi. Her father returned to Somalia.

In 1993, when she was seven, Hassan's mother sent her to Seattle, Washington, to live with family friends in the city's South End; the goal was for the rest of her family to join her eventually, but by the time she was in middle school she "realized no one was coming". She later lived with a friend's family. Her mother and siblings went to Norway. She did not see them for fifteen years and has only seen her father once since he returned to Somalia.

Hassan graduated from high school early and enrolled at Bellevue College when she was 16.

== Career ==
Hassan began modeling while attending high school and college. She moved to Brooklyn to pursue modeling but soon started creating Somali sauces and chutneys using her mother's recipes, which she'd practiced while visiting Oslo for her first reunion with her family in fifteen years, with a goal of selling them. In 2014 she opened Basbaas Somali Foods. By 2015 she was selling several varieties.

She hosted several programs for Bon Appetit's YouTube channel, including "Hawa at Home;” “Hawa in the Kitchen,” and “Spice of Life”.

=== In Bibi's Kitchen ===
In 2017 Hassan met Julia Turshen, with whom she co-authored the 2020 cookbook In Bibi’s Kitchen: The Recipes and Stories of Grandmothers from the Eight African Countries That Touch the Indian Ocean, which won the 2022 James Beard award for best international cookbook. Multiple publishers rejected the book, and only one, Ten Speed Press, entered negotiations.

The book focuses on foods from African countries that border the Indian Ocean (Comoros, Eritrea, Kenya, Madagascar, Mozambique, Somalia, South Africa, and Tanzania) and were important in the spice trade; the authors collected recipes from "bibis", the Swahili word for grandmothers, and the book was photographed by Nairobi-based Somali Khadija Farah. The New York Times named it one of the best cookbooks of 2020.

== Bibliography ==
- In Bibi's Kitchen : the recipes & stories of grandmothers from the eight African countries that touch the Indian Ocean. Ten Speed Press. 2020. ISBN 9781984856739. With Julia Turshen.
- Setting a Place for Us: Recipes and Stories of Displacement, Resilience, and Community from Eight Countries Impacted by War. Ten Speed Press. 2025. ISBN 9781984860972.

== Personal life ==
As of 2021 Hassan was living in New York City.
