= Nik Kacy =

American fashion designer

NiK Kacy
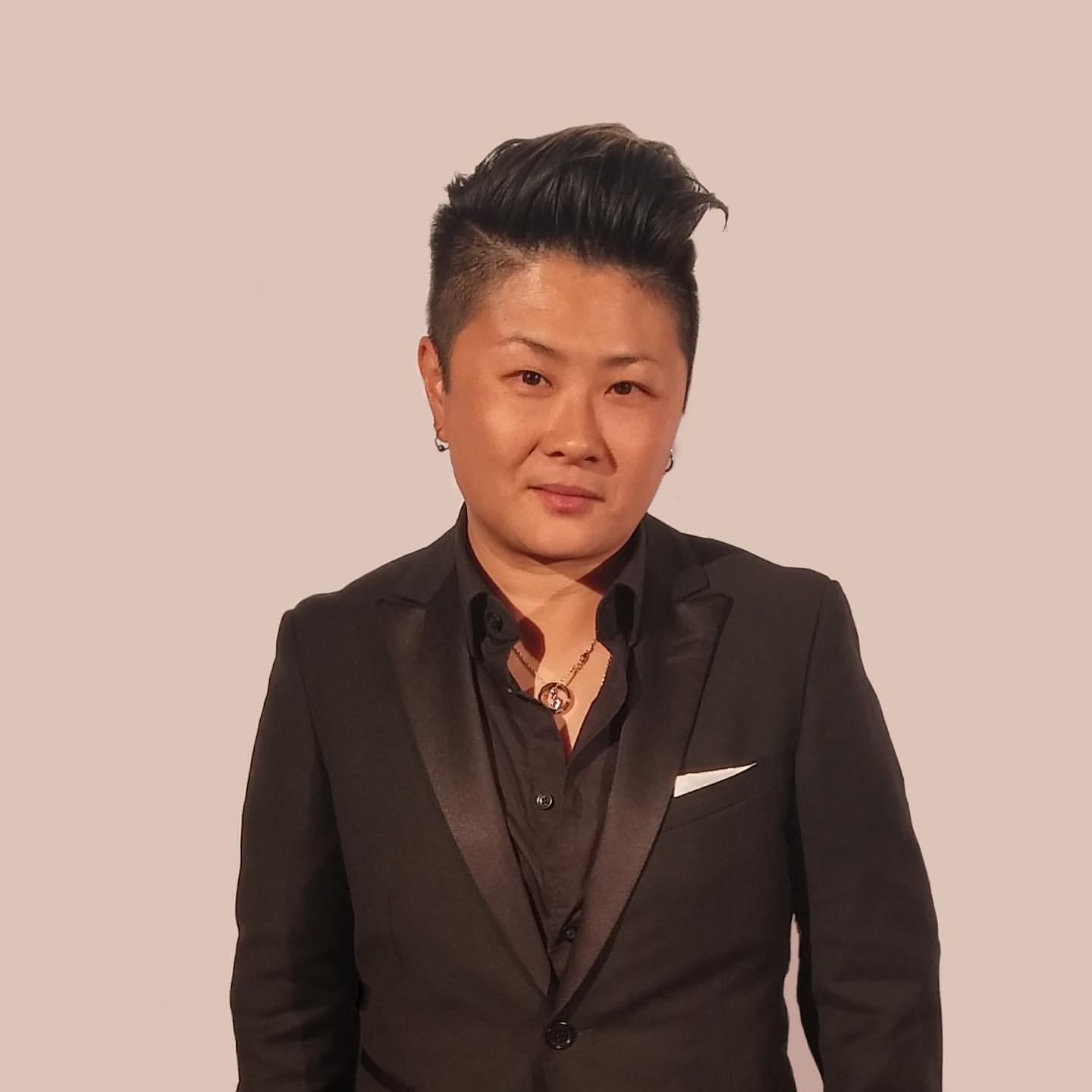
- NiK Kacy in 2016
- Born: 1975 (age 50–51); Hong Kong
- Occupations: Executive producer, fashion designer, entrepreneur, activist
- Known for: Founder of NiK Kacy Footwear, creator of Equality Fashion Week
- Website: www.nikkacy.com www.equalityfashionweek.com

Nik Kacy, stylized as NiK Kacy (born 1975) is an executive producer, fashion designer, founder of NiK Kacy Footwear, the first genderequal footwear and accessories brand, creator of Equality Fashion Week, former board member of the Los Angeles LGBT Chamber of Commerce, and part of the Trans Inclusion Task Force for the National LGBT Chamber of Commerce. In September 2019, Wells Fargo featured Kacy on their Empowerful Exchange video series. In 2017 and 2019, Kacy's gender-free fashion approach was discussed in two scholarly articles, and in 2020, in the book Crossing Gender Boundaries: Fashion to Create, Disrupt, and Transcend. Kacy is a trans-masculine gender-nonbinary person and uses the pronouns they/them/their.

== Early life ==
Kacy was born in Hong Kong and immigrated to New York City at age seven. From a young age, Kacy knew they wanted to create shoes. They were bullied in school and experienced their parents' divorce as traumatic. Due to the intensity of bullying they experienced, they were faced with the "horrible predicament" of becoming "a bully in order to survive", (Queery podcast, 54:10) yet was simultaneously "very depressed" and "suicidal", often wishing they had not been born. (All Things Therapy podcast, 29:40) It was after a home invasion, during which Kacy and Kacy's grandparents had guns and machetes pointed at them, that Kacy realized they never again wanted to "make someone else feel like a victim". (Queery podcast, 56:28) Thereafter, Kacy stopped bullying others and instead began breaking up fights among peers, "inspired to be somebody who was more of a peacemaker". (Queery podcast, 57:03) Helping the transition, a family friend, who became Kacy's stepfather, had helped the family pay for Kacy to attend a Catholic high school in New Jersey. The change in environment was helpful, as previously Kacy was witness to gang violence at their New York schools.

=== Identity ===
Kacy knew they were born in the wrong body from a very young age (Queery podcast, 11:39). They would initially identify as gay or lesbian (Queery podcast, 14:46) and had their first queer relationship in college. It was later that they had the realization that they wanted to transition to a male-presenting body with the help of testosterone hormone therapy. They were finally able to achieve the hormone aspect of the process while an employee at Google. They were then able to complete their transition by way of various surgeries in their late 30s, after quitting their Google job to start their shoe business.

== Education ==
Kacy attended grade schools in New York and New Jersey. They majored in fine art and advertising and minored in international relations at Pepperdine University, and it was in those years that they first came out as queer, incidentally during a truth or dare game with friends. They graduated in 1997. (All Things Therapy podcast, 3:29)

== Career ==
Prior to entering the fashion world, Kacy worked as a producer and project manager at Google, creating online branded engagement programs, such as livestreams, and conceptualizing novel ways for consumers to engage with Google platforms. (Queery podcast, 26:44) They left their post in 2013 to pursue shoe design.

=== NiK Kacy Footwear ===
NiK Kacy Footwear was founded in 2013. (Coming Out with Lauren & Nicole podcast, 1:52) For initial funding, Kacy turned to Kickstarter, raising $6,000 of their $36,000 goal in a single day. The company's goal was to create “genderequal luxury shoes and accessories that are handcrafted, high-quality, utility products”. The company creates footwear and accessories with genderequal sizing and styles, which Kacy believes eliminates the need for differentiation between men's and women's styles, instead placing the focus on the consumer's personal taste, rather than the manufacturer's tastes for two genders. Kacy traveled through 12 European cities to learn the contours of the shoe-making industry, accumulating knowledge from traditional workshops in Italy and elsewhere before creating his own methodology in a slight departure from traditional craftsmanship. Manufacture took place in Portugal and as of 2019 takes place in artisan ateliers in Leon, Mexico. Some of the Kacy Footwear aesthetic inspiration derives from Calvin Klein, John Varvatos, Alexander McQueen, Tom Ford, and Kenneth Cole.

=== Equality Fashion Week ===
Equality Fashion Week is an annual multi-day event, held during Los Angeles Fashion Week, that features the work of LGBTQIA+ fashion designers by way of runway shows and pop-up shops. The event has featured designs by Sharpe Suiting, Lior Boroda, Fem/Haus, Dapper Boi, and has been sponsored by the Los Angeles LGBT Center, Outfest, and the TransLatina Coalition.

The inaugural Equality Fashion Week's opening night took place in 2018 at the Montrose West Hollywood Hotel. Six LGBT designers were represented. The entirety of the event was held over the course of five days. Trans activist and model Carmen Carrera presided over the festivities.

In 2019, Equality Fashion Week took place, before a sold-out crowd, at the Globe Theatre. The event featured 110-115 models, 37 dancers, five hosts, live musicians, and a DJ.

=== Advocacy ===
- In March 2019, Kacy was a featured speaker at the WBA LGBT Economic Summit & Conference.
- In June 2019, Kacy appeared on the panel "Non-Binary and Genderqueer: A New Awareness of Gender Identities" during Los Angeles Pride's Trans Pride festivities.
- Kacy has been a youth mentor at the Models of Pride Conference, offering their counsel during Ask Anything: Queer Open Office Hours.
- NIk Kacy Footwear raises funds for Los Angeles’ TransLatina Coalition, an organization that advocates for trans individuals who are immigrants to the United States.
- In June 2017, the Advocate selected Kacy to honor Laverne Cox for their 50 Years, 50 Heroes video series.

== Honors and recognition ==
- In 2020, Kacy's gender-free fashion approach was analyzed in the book Crossing Gender Boundaries: Fashion to Create, Disrupt, and Transcend.
- In September 2019, Wells Fargo featured Kacy on their Empowerful Exchange series; Jordin Sparks and Amber Whittington interviewed Kacy about Kacy's entrepreneurship and disruption of gendered fashion.
- In August 2019, Kacy's gender-free fashion approach was discussed in the scholarly work Queer Fashion and Style: Stories from the Heartland, The Journal of the Costume Society of America, Iowa State University, Sara Marcketti PhD.
- In 2017, Kacy's gender-free fashion approach was discussed in the scholarly article Capital T: Trans Visibility, Corporate Capitalism, and Commodity Culture; Duke University Press; Emmanuel David, PhD.

== Podcasts ==
| Date | Title | Episode |
|---|---|---|
| 2019 | Cameron Airen | "NiK Kacy: Revolutionizing Gender & Fashion, Gender Equal Footwear, Moving Beyond The Binary" |
| 2019 | Coming Out with Lauren & Nicole | Episode 57 |
| 2018 | The Advocates | "NiK Kacy Kicks Down Gender Expectations" |
| 2018 | Queery | Episode 56 |
| 2017 | The Out Entrepreneur with Rhodes Perry | "Step Away from Limiting Beliefs and Commit to Your Business Dreams with Nik Kacy, Founder of Nik Kacy Footwear" |
| 2017 | All Things Therapy | "NiK Kacy" |
| 2017 | Feminist Crush | "Nik Kacy" |
| 2017 | LGBTQ&A | "NiK Kacy: Embracing the Absence of Gender...Beginning with Shoes" |

== Filmography ==
| Date | Title | Episode |
|---|---|---|
| Oct. 10, 2019 | Indie Source | "L.A.'s ONLY LGBT Fashion Show: NIk Kacy Invites YOU to Equality #Fashion Week" |
| Oct. 7, 2019 | Jampacked | "NiK Kacy (Founder of NiK Kacy Footwear/Creator of Equality Fashion Week)" |
| Sept. 2019 | Empowerful Exchange by Wells Fargo | "Episode II: Nik Kacy" |
| May 29, 2019 | RYOT | "Nik Kacy Helps LGBTQ People Find Their Comfort Zone in Fashion" |
