= Grace Bonney =

American author and blogger (born 1981)

- Born: June 9, 1981 (age 45)
- Education: College of William & Mary
- Occupations: Author, blogger and entrepreneur
- Years active: 2004–present
- Known for: Design*Sponge (blog)
- Spouses: Aaron Coles (m. 2009; div. 2011) Julia Turshen (m. 2013)

Grace Bonney (born June 9, 1981) is an American author, blogger, and entrepreneur. Bonney is best known for founding the interior design blog Design*Sponge, which published for 15 years. Bonney wrote The New York Times bestseller, In The Company of Women, a book featuring more than 100 stories about women entrepreneurs who overcame adversity. Bonney is also the author of the DIY interior design book Design*Sponge at Home.

== Career ==
=== Design*Sponge ===
In 2004, Bonney founded the interior design blog Design*Sponge, which is dedicated to intersectional and inclusive conversations about design and cultural issues. The site posted content daily and was dedicated to fostering a creative community. The popular website reached nearly two million readers per day for 15 years and was called "one of the internet's most popular design blogs" by Adobe. The last article on Design*Sponge was posted in August 2019 and the entire blog is archived at the Library of Congress.

The blog started out as a side project which Bonney ran alongside full-time jobs, first at a design PR firm and later as a freelance writer for multiple interior and design-related publications including House and Garden, Domino, and Craft. By 2009, Design*Sponge had gained a large following and interest from advertisers; making enough revenue for Bonney to work on it full time. Bonney has stated that Design*Sponge benefitted from being an early era blog: "When you went on the internet and looked for furniture or interior design, there was only going to be a few of us that popped up. We grew in a way that is nearly impossible to do today, organically."

The focus of the blog evolved over time, reflecting Bonney's personal evolution and interests. It moved "away from products to center on people" and began addressing "topics such as how gender, classism, and racism, social issues, and diversity connect to and influence design."

Bonney's decision to close the blog was prompted by the shifting advertising industry, the role of social media, and the proliferation of design sites; all of which made it financially unsustainable to continue running the website. Instead of shifting the blog's content strategy or "chasing clicks", Bonney chose to end the blog after its 15th year.

=== Good Company ===
In 2018, Bonney began publishing the print magazine Good Company: Where Creativity Meets Business. The magazine was inspired by Bonney's book, In the Company of Women. It was created to provide "motivation, inspiration, practical advice, and a vital sense of connection and community for women and non-binary creatives at every stage of life." Intended to be bi-annual, the magazine ultimately ran for three issues.

== Personal life ==
Bonney was raised in Virginia Beach and attended the College of William & Mary. Bonney moved to New York after college. Bonney was bullied in middle school and high school for being queer; because of this, Bonney struggled with internalized homophobia until age 30. In October 2003, Bonney met Aaron Coles. They married in 2009 and divorced in 2011. Following the divorce, Bonney publicly came out as queer.

In 2013, Bonney married chef Julia Turshen. On the LGBTQ&A podcast, Bonney said, "I mean, it's a super stereotypical lesbian story of email, date, moved in three days later, married four months later, dog, house, all the cliches." Bonney is queer. In 2022, Bonney came out as non-binary and no longer uses she/her pronouns.

Bonney was diagnosed with Type 1 diabetes at the age of 35.

Bonney has spoken out about how women have unrealistic expectations about work and life balance, and believes it is important for women to learn about successful role models. Bonney's entrepreneurial work was noted in the Frederick Douglass 200 project, which honors the impact of 200 living people who embody the spirit and work of Frederick Douglass.

== Published work ==
- Design*Sponge at Home (2014), Artisan; ISBN 9781579654313
- In the Company of Women: Inspiration and Advice from over 100 Makers, Artists, and Entrepreneurs (2016), Artisan; ISBN 9781579659813
- Collective Wisdom: Lessons, Inspiration, and Advice from Women over 50 (2021), Artisan; ISBN 978-1579659431
