= Blair Imani =

American author and historian (born 1993)

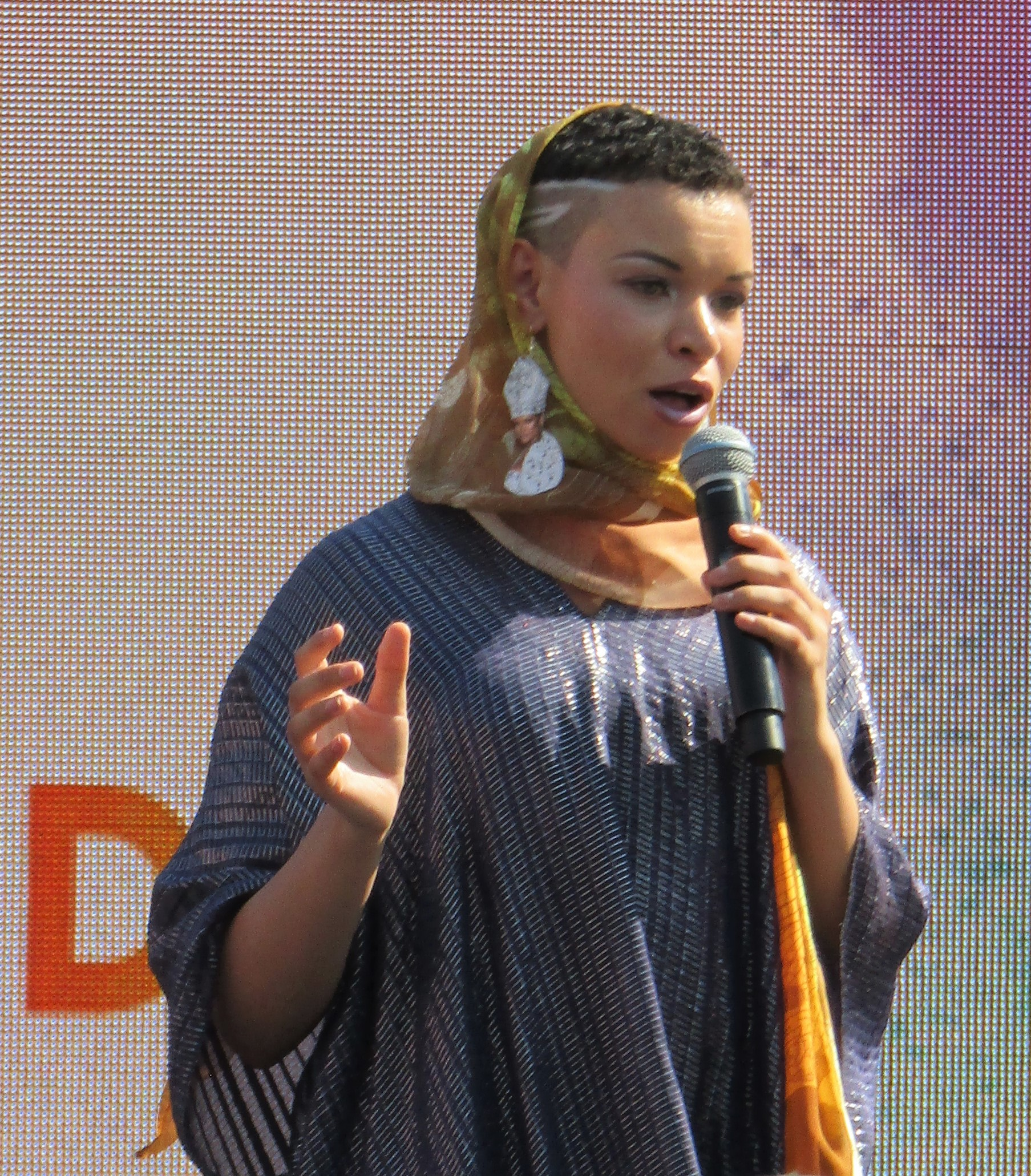
- Blair Imani in 2018
- Born: Blair Elizabeth Brown; October 31, 1993 (age 32)
- Education: Louisiana State University
- Known for: Activism
- Movement: Black Lives Matter
- Website: https://blairimani.com

Blair Imani (born Blair Elizabeth Brown, October 31, 1993) is an American author, historian, and educator. She is queer, Black, and Muslim. Since 2020 she has been known for creating and hosting the viral web series Smarter in Seconds. In previous years, she came to popularity after her involvement with the Black Lives Matter movement and her unlawful arrest while protesting the shooting of Alton Sterling. She also participated in protesting Executive Order 13769.

== Education and career ==
Imani grew up in San Marino, California, and graduated from San Marino High School in 2012. She graduated from Louisiana State University (LSU) with a degree in history in 2015.

In 2014, during her time at LSU, Imani founded an organization called Equality for HER (Health Education Resources). Equality for HER is a non-profit that provides resources and a forum for women and nonbinary people to feel empowered. In 2016, she worked as a Press Officer for Planned Parenthood Action Fund. She also worked as the Civic Action & Campaign Lead at DoSomething, a tech company for young people and social change.

Imani is the author of Modern HERstory: Stories of Women and Nonbinary People Rewriting History, published by Ten Speed Press on October 16, 2018. The book is illustrated by Monique Le and "spotlights 70 overlooked but important people of color, queer people, trans people, disabled people, and more who are changing the world this very moment."

She is also the author of the illustrated history book Making Our Way Home: The Great Migration and the Black American Dream, published in January 2020. It is illustrated by Rachelle Baker and teaches about the Great Migration, black history, and "how privilege shows up in the way that we even depict black stories."

In September 2020, Imani launched "Smarter in Seconds", a series of informational videos on Instagram Reels and TikTok around topics such as consent, discrimination, and environmental protection.

In October 2025, Blair was interviewed by PBS KIDS character Ruff Ruffman, who's voiced by Jim Conroy in a new spin-off called Ruff Ruffman: Content Creator, about brand identity and online authenticity.

== Activism in Baton Rouge ==
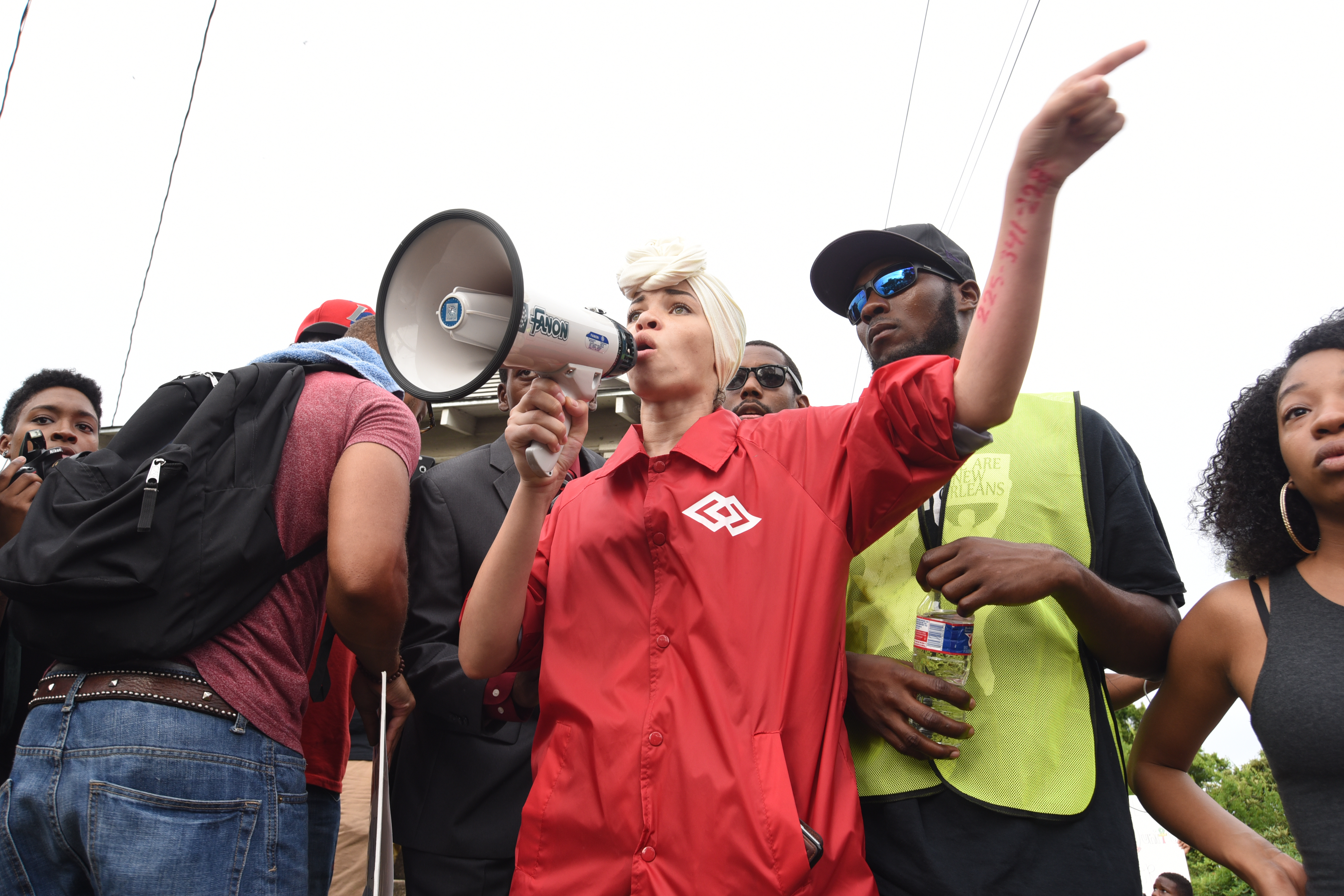
Blair Imani at Baton Rouge rally in protest of the police shooting of Alton Sterling

On July 10, 2016, in the aftermath of the shooting of Alton Sterling, Imani took part in a protest in Baton Rouge, Louisiana. While protesting, she and her partner Akeem Muhammad were arrested. In an interview with The Intercept, Imani detailed her encounter with Baton Rouge SWAT officers. She claimed that she was trampled and threatened verbally. She was photographed screaming as she was carried away by special force officers.

While being detained, she alleges one officer ordered: "really give it to her," and that another officer removed her hijab.

Less than a week after her arrest, Imani helped organize a vigil with the Louisiana State University Student Body Association in response to and in honor of the murder of three Baton Rouge police officers. In an article in The Advocate, she said, "All violence is wrong," and that she is against all brutality, including violence against police officers.

== Personal life ==
Imani converted to Islam from Christianity in 2015. During the Black Lives Matter protests following the 2015 Chapel Hill shooting, Imani decided to contact nearby mosques to fight for both Black lives and the rights and safety of Muslims in America, which eventually led to her conversion. She stated she would read the Quran which helped further her connection with God.

She changed her surname to Imani and explained that "Imani means 'my faith' and it's one of the days of Kwanzaa, it's also a Swahili word as well as an Arabic word, and I felt like it encapsulated my journey to Islam." A year after converting she began wearing the hijab, but briefly stopped wearing it following the 2016 presidential election as a precaution for her own safety.

Imani came out as queer in June 2017 while making an appearance on Tucker Carlson Tonight. During the program, she spoke about fighting for communities, one of which was the LGBTQ community, when she was interrupted. The host, Tucker Carlson, stated "You're not here to speak on behalf of those communities." Blair responded "Well, Tucker Carlson, in addition to being a Muslim woman, I am a black, queer person." The announcement received both positive and negative reactions afterwards including death threats and words of encouragement. After coming out, she said she received support "from queer Muslims and young people all over the world" and that she found solace in the representation of LGBTQ Muslims on The Bold Type.

== Works ==
Year	Title	Publisher	ISBN	Notes
2018	Modern HERstory: Stories of Women and Nonbinary People Rewriting History	Ten Speed Press	ISBN 9780399582233	Illustrated by Monique Le. This book "spotlights 70 overlooked but important people of color, queer people, trans people, disabled people, and more who are changing the world this very moment."
2020	Making Our Way Home: The Great Migration and the Black American Dream	Random House	ISBN 9781984856920	Illustrated history book. Illustrated by Rachelle Baker. This book teaches about the Great Migration, black history, and "how privilege shows up in the way that we even depict black stories".
2021	Read This to Get Smarter about Race, Class, Gender, Disability & More	Potter/Ten Speed/Harmony/Rodale	ISBN 9781984860545	This book "helps readers become informed, compassionate and socially conscious through discussions on race, gender and sexual orientation to disability, class and beyond".
