= Kim Fountain =

LGBTQ+ activist

- Born: 1968 (age 57–58)
- Occupations: LGBTQ+ activist, CEO, former COO and executive

Dr. Kim Fountain (born 1968) is the Deputy CEO of The San Diego LGBT Community Center. She was previously the Chief Operating Officer of the Center on Halsted, the Midwest's largest LGBTQ+ community center, located in Chicago, Illinois, the executive director of the Pride Center of Vermont, and the co-director for the New York City Gay & Lesbian Anti-Violence Project. Fountain has served on the New York State Crime Victims Board and is a trainer for the Office of Victims of Crime and the National Coalition of Anti-Violence Programs' Reports Committee. She serves on the board of the National Asian Pacific American Women's Forum.

== Early life ==
Fountain grew up in Massachusetts. She is the product of an interracial marriage; her parents, a white father and a Japanese mother, married before anti-miscegenation laws passed. Fountain's father, who was in the army at the time, was told he must leave his wife up north while stationed in the American South, which he refused to accept. He was forced to leave the military because of this. Fountain credits her parents' interracial marriage and steadfast love for each other as providing the foundation for their acceptance of and love for her as a queer woman, since they "understood loving somebody that society tells you is not ok."

Fountain came out as gay in the 1980s, during college. The first person she told was her residence hall director, also a queer woman. Fountain then came out to her roommates and her parents. After college, she took a motorcycle trip to Santa Cruz, California, settling there in a "tight-knit lesbian community." She moved to Park Slope, Brooklyn, New York in 1995 to pursue graduate studies at The New School.

== Education ==
Fountain holds a bachelor's degree in Anthropology and Women's Studies from the University of Massachusetts Amherst and a PhD in Cultural Anthropology from New York's The New School. In school, her emphasis was on studying issues of identity-based violence. She did field work studying the Presbyterian Church (USA) in order to better understand the intersection of the politics of queerness and religion.

== Career ==
Fountain has been working in LGBTQ+ movement since the 1980s, when she began as a participant in street demonstrations alongside other queer activists. She formally entered the field in 1995, when she went to work for the New York City LGBT Community Center, where she spent a year. She then spent ten years working for the New York City Gay & Lesbian Anti-Violence Project, holding the office of Deputy Director as well as associate director of Education & Public Advocacy. Following that, she worked as executive director of the Pride Center of Vermont for five years. She is credited with revitalizing the center, which was struggling to stay afloat financially when she started her tenure. Her current post as of 2019, which she's occupied for several years, is Chief Operating Officer of the Center on Halsted, the Midwest's largest LGBTQ+ community center, located in Chicago, Illinois.

Fountain has authored reports such as Rethinking Victim Assistance for Lesbian, Gay, Bisexual, Transgender, and Queer Victims of Hate Violence & Intimate Partner Violence (2010). Her speaking engagements have included the Chicago Equality Rally at the Andersonville Midsommarfest, the Illinois Women's Health Conference (at which she led the workshop Accessing Women’s Health: Lesbian, Bisexual, and Transgender Women’s Lives at the Intersection of Healthcare and Knowledge), the #WeAreOrlando rally in Burlington, Vermont, the PricewaterhouseCoopers and Center on Halsted panel on LGBT politics in the workplace, Chicago Hacknight (at which she presented on Center on Halsted data), and Lesbians Who Tech

=== Teaching ===
Fountain has been a university lecturer for 11 years, instructing in anthropology and gender studies. Her courses have included The Anthropology of Violence; Sexuality and Nation Building; Gender and Social Change; and Gender, Race, and Class.

=== Other activism ===
In addition to her jobs and lectures, Fountain has participated in activism activities such as the AIDS Run & Walk Chicago, A Love Letter to Myself: A Chicago Variety Show promoting self-acceptance and empowerment, and storytelling events in honor of Sexual Assault Awareness Month.

== Bibliography ==
=== As author ===
- Addressing Sexual and Relationship Violence in the LGBT Community Using a Bystander Framework (2012)
- Online Gay High School Offers New Safe Haven for LGBTQ Youth (2011)
- Rethinking Victim Assistance for Lesbian, Gay, Bisexual, Transgender, and Queer Victims of Hate Violence & Intimate Partner Violence (2010)
- Lesbian, Gay, Bisexual and Transgender Domestic Violence in the United States in 2008: A Report From The National Coalition of Anti-Violence Programs (2009)
- Culturally Competent Service Provision to Lesbian, Gay, Bisexual and Transgender Survivors of Sexual Violence (2009)
- Lesbian, Gay, Bisexual and Transgender Domestic Violence in the United States in 2006: A Report of the National Coalition of Anti-Violence Programs (2007)

=== As contributor ===
- Understanding the Affordable Housing Development Process: A Primer for LGBT Aging Providers (2018)
- Culturally Competent Service Provision to Lesbian, Gay, Bisexual and Transgender Survivors of Sexual Violence (2009)
- Testing Women, Testing the Fetus: The Social Impact of Amniocentesis in America by Rayna Rapp (2000)

== Podcasts ==
Date	Show	Episode
2019	Am I Man Enough?	n/a
2018	Queery	"Kim Fountain"
2016	Vermont Conversation	"Kim Fountain: The LGBTQ Struggle Continues"
