= Julia Turshen =

American cookbook author

- Born: 1985 (age 40–41)
- Occupations: Cookbook author, food writer, cook, food equity advocate
- Spouse: Grace Bonney (m. 2013)

Julia Turshen (born 1985) is an American cookbook author, food writer, cook, and food equity advocate. She lectures on food and home cooking and has published four solo books on the subject and has contributed to many others in collaboration or as a writer. She has collaborated with Gwyneth Paltrow, Dana Cowin, and Mario Batali. Her 2020 collaboration with Hawa Hassan, In Bibi's Kitchen, won the 2022 James Beard Foundation award for Best International Cookbook.

She hosts the podcast Keep Calm and Cook On and writes a monthly column in Food & Wine called The Interview. She has written for the New York Times, Condé Nast Traveler, Vogue, and Bon Appétit. She serves on the Smithsonian National Museum of American History's Kitchen Cabinet Advisory Board and is the founder of Equity At The Table (EATT), a digital directory of people of color, women, and non-binary individuals in food. She also regularly provides meals for Citizen Action of New York, which led to her 2016 appointment as developer of the organization's food team.

== Early life and education ==
Turshen grew up with one brother in a liberal, secular New York Jewish household. Her mother was an art director and her father was a graphic designer. Turshen was interested in cookbooks from a young age. At age 13, she opened a mini restaurant in her family's home. Her maternal grandparents, refugees to the United States, owned a bread bakery in Brooklyn, which Turshen's mother grew up in. Though she never met her grandparents, Turshen believes these roots created a "hereditary, genetic" pull toward cooking within her. As her parents did not cook much, she taught herself with the help of books, Julia Child, and the Discovery Channel's Great Chefs show. Between high school and college, Turshen worked at Kneaded Bread Bakery in Port Chester, New York.

Turshen did not attend culinary school; she attended Barnard College, where she majored in English. During her time there, she interned for Food & Wine magazine, a cookbook author, and a food show television producer. She began working part-time for the producer while still in college.

== Career ==
After college, Turshen was hired as an assistant to a writer who had been hired to write the companion book for a PBS travel show about food and cooking; the job was in Spain. When the writer left the project, Turshen was given the opportunity to write the book herself. She subsequently co-authored and collaborated on approximately ten cookbooks, and supplemented her income by working as a private chef for wealthy clients.

In 2016, Turshen released her first solo cookbook, Small Victories: Recipes, Advice + Hundreds of Ideas for Home Cooking Triumphs. It was listed as one of The New York Times' best cookbooks of that year, one of NPR's best cookbooks of that year, and one of the Boston Globe's best cookbooks for holiday giving.

In 2017, Turshen released Feed the Resistance: Recipes + Ideas for Getting Involved, whose proceeds she donated to the ACLU. The book was a meditation on food and activism. It went on to earn Eater's Best Cookbook of 2017. The San Francisco Chronicle lauded it as one of their picks for best cookbooks of 2017 and The Village Voice included it on their list of 2017's Best Food Books for Woke Readers (and Eaters).

In 2018, Turshen's book Now & Again: Go-To Recipes, Inspired Menus + Endless Ideas for Reinventing Leftovers was nominated for a Goodreads Choice Award in the category of Best Food & Cookbooks.

In 2019, Turshen's podcast, Keep Calm and Cook On, was nominated for an International Association of Culinary Professionals Award.

In 2024, Turshen published What Goes With What: 100 Recipes, 20 Charts, Endless Possibilities.

=== Lectures ===
Turshen has given talks or served as moderator at venues including Brooklyn's Museum of Food & Drink, the University of Michigan, New Orleans' Dillard University, The New York Times Food Festival, the National Museum of American History, the Philly Chef Conference, and the William Vale Hotel.

She has also been featured on Google Talks, NPR, KCRW, and PRX.

== Awards ==
- Eater's Best Cookbook of 2017
- 2022 James Beard award for best international cookbook

== Personal life ==
Turshen is married to Design Sponge founder Grace Bonney. They have resided in Ulster County, New York since 2014, having previously lived in Greenpoint, Brooklyn.

== Published works ==
=== Solo projects ===
- Now & Again: Go-To Recipes, Inspired Menus + Endless Ideas for Reinventing Leftovers (2018)
- Feed the Resistance: Recipes + Ideas for Getting Involved (2017)
- Small Victories: Recipes, Advice + Hundreds of Ideas for Home Cooking Triumphs (2016)
- Simply Julia: 110 Easy Recipes for Healthy Comfort Food (2021)
- What Goes with What: 100 Recipes, 20 Charts, Endless Possibilities (2024)

=== Collaborations ===
- The Hot Bread Kitchen Cookbook: Artisanal Baking from Around the World Jessamyn Rodriguez and Julia Turshen (2015)
- Elizabeth Street Cafe by Julia Turshen, Larry McGuire, and Tom Moorman (2017)
- It's All Good by Gwyneth Paltrow and Julia Turshen
- Buvette: The Pleasure of Good Food by Jody Williams with Julia Turshen
- In Bibi’s Kitchen: The Recipes and Stories of Grandmothers from the Eight African Countries That Touch the Indian Ocean, with Hawa Hassan (2020)
