= Eleanor Medhurst =

Fashion historian

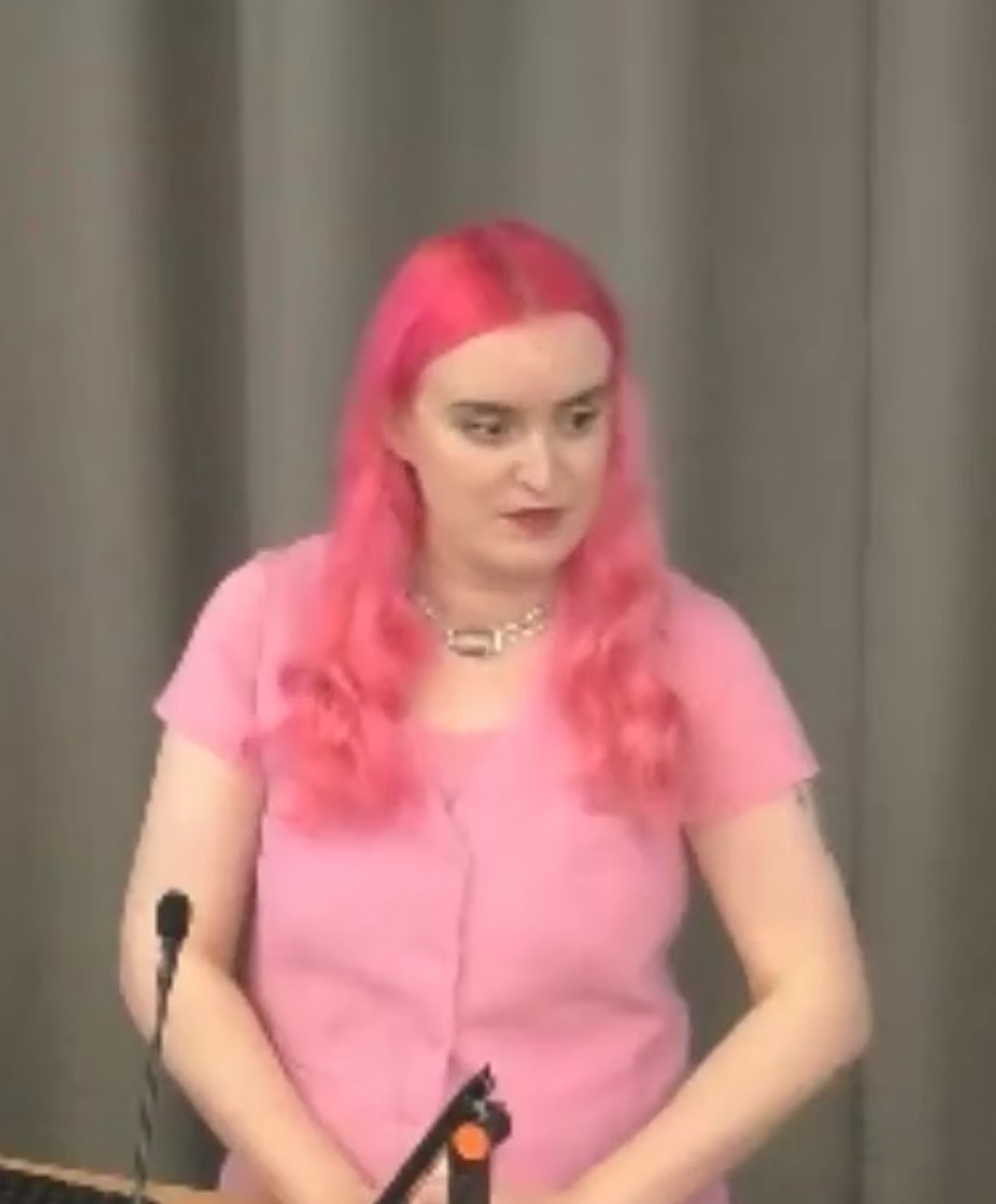
- Medhurst speaking during a lecture at SOAS, University of London in 2024.
- Born: 24 April 1997 (age 29)
- Other name: Ellie Medhurst
- Education: University of Brighton
- Years active: 2018–present
- Spouse: Lilith Dillon-Parkin
- Website: dressingdykes.com

Eleanor Medhurst (born 24 April 1997) is a fashion historian from Brighton. Her debut book Unsuitable: A History of Lesbian Fashion was released in 2024.

== Early life and education ==
Medhurst is from Brighton. She graduated with a Bachelor of Arts (BA) in Fashion and Dress History in 2019 and a Master of Arts (MA) in the History of Design and Material Culture in 2021, both from the University of Brighton. She received a Yarwood Grant from the Costume Society for the latter.

== Career ==
During her studies, Medhurst worked at the Brighton Museum, contributing to the 2018 Queer Looks display and Queer the Pier. She also had a column in Polyester Zine and started uploading videos online. After completing her MA, Medhurst started the blog Dressing Dykes, saying she "wanted to make this research accessible".

In October 2023, Hurst Publishers acquired the rights to publish Medhurst's debut book Unsuitable: A History of Lesbian Fashion in June 2024. The book's 18 chapters are each dedicated to specific communities, figures and time periods while also examining the hidden nature of specifically lesbian fashion history. Medhurst described lesbian fashion history as a "patchwork of examples". In 2025 Unsuitable was longlisted for the Bread and Roses Award, as well as for the Polari Prize for LGBTQ+ writers in the First Book category. Medhurst was one of several authors to withdraw her book from the Polari Prize to protest the inclusion of John Boyne over his anti-transgender views.

In 2026, Welbeck published Medhurst's second book, Icons of Style: Billie Eilish: The Story of a Fashion Legend. This book details the evolution of singer Billie Eilish's personal style.

== Bibliography ==
- Unsuitable: A History of Lesbian Fashion (2024)
- Icons of Style: Billie Eilish: The Story of a Fashion Legend (2026)
