= Leanne =

Leanne, LeAnne, Leann, LeAnn, Lee-Anne, Lee Anne, Lee-Ann, Lee Ann, Li-Anne, etc. are female given names and may refer to one of the following people:

== Leann, LeAnn, and Leeann ==
- Leann Birch (1946–2019), American developmental psychologist
- Leann Fennelly (born 1990), Irish camogie player and student
- Leann Hunley (born 1955), American television actress
- Leann Tilley, Australian biology professor
- LeAnn Lemberger (born 1954), American writer
- LeAnn Rimes (born 1982), American singer, songwriter, actress, and author
- Leeann Chin (1933–2010), Chinese-born American restaurateur, entrepreneur, and businesswoman
- Leeann Dempster, Scottish football executive
- Leeann Tingley, Miss Rhode Island U.S.A. 2006
- Leeann Tweeden (born 1973), American radio broadcaster, model, and sports commentator

== Leanne and LeAnne ==
- Leanne Armand (born 1968), professor and marine scientist
- Leanne Baird, 1998 Miss Canada International
- Leanne Baker (born 1981), former New Zealand professional tennis player, and former American club rugby player
- Leanne Banks (born 1959), American writer of romance novels
- Leanne Barrette (born 1967), American professional bowler on the Professional Women's Bowling Association (P.W.B.A.) Tour
- Leanne Bartolo (born 1987), current W.F.F. European Bikini champion
- Leanne Bautista (born 2010), Filipina child actress
- Leanne Benjamin (born 1964), Australian ballet dancer
- Leanne Best (born 1979), English actress
- Leanne Betasamosake Simpson (born 1971), Mississauga Nishnaabeg writer, musician, and academic from Canada
- Leanne Brown, member of British garage duo Sweet Female Attitude
- Leanne Caret (born 1966), American businesswoman, Boeing executive vice president, president and C.E.O. of Boeing Defense, Space, & Security (B.D.S.), and server of the United Service Organizations (U.S.O.) governor board
- Leanne Castley (born 1974), parliament member in the Australian Capital Territory Legislative Assembly representing the liberals; country singer
- Leanne Champ (born 1983), English football player and coach
- Leanne Chinery (born 1981), Canadian international lawn bowler
- Leanne Choo (born 1991), Australian badminton player
- Leanne Clare (born 1962), current Director of Public Prosecution in Queensland
- Leanne Cope, English ballet dancer and theatre actress
- Leanne Crichton (born 1987), Scottish footballer
- Leanne Davis (born 1985), former English international cricketer
- Leanne Dawson, English academic
- Leanne Del Toso (born 1980), Australian wheelchair basketball player
- Leanne Donaldson, Australian politician
- Leanne Frahm (1946–2025), Australian fiction writer
- Leanne Francis (born 1957), former Australian swimmer
- Leanne Franson (born 1963), Canadian illustrator and cartoonist
- Leanne Ganney (born 1991), English ice hockey player
- Leanne Guinea (born 1985), Australian slalom canoeist
- Leanne Hall (footballer) (born 1980), English football goalkeeper and coach
- Leanne Harple, American politician
- Leanne Harrison (born 1958), retired Australian tennis player
- Leanne Harte, Irish musician, composer, singer and songwriter
- Leanne Hinton, emerita linguistics professor at the University of California at Berkeley
- Leanne Holland (1978–1991), Australian murder victim
- LeAnne Howe (born 1951), author and scholar at the University of Illinois at Urbana-Champaign
- Leanne Johnston, Canadian hiker
- Leanne Jones (born 1985), British actress
- Leanne Kemp, Australian tech entrepreneur
- Leanne Kiernan (born 1999), Irish footballer
- Leanne Krueger, American politician from Pennsylvania
- Leanne Lakey (born 1978), British actress
- Leanne "Lelee" Lyons (born 1973), American member of the vocal group SWV
- Leanne Li (born 1984), former Canadian beauty queen
- Leanne Linard (born 1980), Australian politician
- Leanne Liu (born 1959), Hong Kong actress
- Leanne M Williams, professor in psychiatry and behavioral sciences at Stanford University
- Leanne Macomber, American member of the vocal group Young Ejecta
- Leanne Manas (born 1974), South African television presenter
- Leanne Marshall (born 1980), American fashion designer and winner of season 5 of Project Runway
- Leanne Mitchell (born 1983), English singer and winner of the first series of The Voice UK
- Leanne Mohamad (born 2000), British-Palestinian activist and political candidate
- Leanne Moore (born 1984), winner of the 2008 series of You're a Star
- Leanne Morgan, American stand-up comedian, actress, and author.
- Leanne O'Sullivan, Irish poet
- Leanne Pittsford (born 1980/1981), American entrepreneur
- Leanne Pompeani (born 1996), Australian long-distance runner
- Leanne Pooley, Canadian-born New Zealand film maker
- Leanne Ratcliffe (born 1980), Australian YouTube personality, vegan activist, speaker, and author
- Leanne Redman, American physiologist and obesity expert
- Leanne Riley (born 1993), English rugby union player
- Leanne Rivlin (born 1929), an originator of the Environmental Psychology Doctoral Program at The Graduate Center of The City University of New York during the late 1960s
- Leanne Ross (born 1981), Scottish women's football midfielder
- Leanne Rowat, Canadian politician
- Leanne Rowe (born 1982), English actress and singer
- Leanne Rycroft (born 1969), Australian gymnast
- Leanne Schuster (born 1973), American indoor volleyball and beach volleyball player
- Leanne Shapton (born 1973), Canadian artist and graphic novelist
- Leanne Smith (born 1987), American World Cup alpine ski racer
- Leanne Smith (swimmer) (born 1988), American Paralympic swimmer
- Leanne Spencer, Canadian winner of Supermodel of the World in 1996
- Leanne Tander (born 1980), Australian racecar driver
- Leanne Taylor (born 1992), Canadian paratriathlete
- Leanne Teale (born 1970), Canadian serial killer and rapist
- Leanne Tiernan (1984–2000), English murder victim
- Leanne Trimboli (born 1975), former Australian soccer goalkeeper
- Leanne van den Hoek (born 1958), officer of the Royal Netherlands Army
- Leanne Van Dyk (born 1955), American reformed theologian and theological educator
- Leanne Walker (born 1968), former New Zealand basketball player
- Leanne Wilson (born 1980), British actress
- Leanne Wong (born 2003), American gymnast
- Leanne Wood (born 1971), Plaid Cymru member of the National Assembly for Wales

=== Fictional characters ===
- Leanne Battersby, from the British television soap Coronation Street
- Leanne Black-Johnson, from the New Zealand soap Shortland Street
- Leanne Buxton, from the British television series Bad Girls
- Leanne Holiday, from the British soap Hollyoaks and its Internet spin-off Hollyoaks: Freshers
- Leanne Johnstone, from the BBC Scotland soap River City
- Leanne Macintosh, from the American television series Matlock
- Leanne Powell, from the British soap Brookside
- Leanne Grayson, main protagonist and title character in Apple's 2019-2023 supernatural, physiological thriller Servant
- Leanne, from the sitcom Leanne

== LeeAnna and Lee Ann ==
- Lee Ann Kluger, American politician
- LeeAnna Warner (born 1998), an American girl who disappeared in 2003
- Lee Ann Womack, American country singer
