= Leeanna =

Leeanna or LeeAnna is a feminine given name. Notable people with the name include:

- Leeanna Walsman (born 1979), New Zealand actress
- Leeanna Pendergast (born 1962), Canadian politician
- LeeAnna Warner (1998–2003), American girl

== See also ==
- Leanna
- Liana
