= Liana (name) =

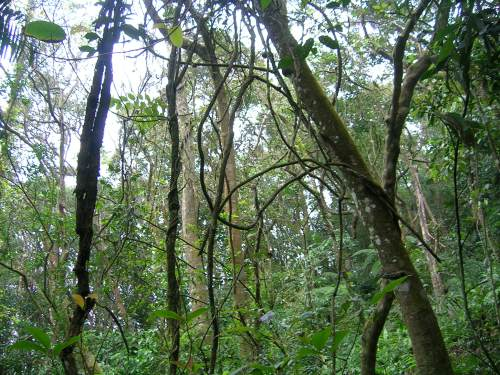
- Liana tangle in India.
- Gender: Female
- Name day: 10 December

Origin
- Origin: various, including French and Arabic

Other names
- Variant forms: Eliana, Juliana, Liliana, Liyana

Liana is a female given name. It is a short form of Eliana, Juliana, Liliana, Liyana and other names that end in -liana. It can also be a botanical name derived from Liana.

In French Liana comes from the word liane, this name means "to climb like a vine". Lianas may be found in many different plant families. Bougainvillea is an example of a liana.

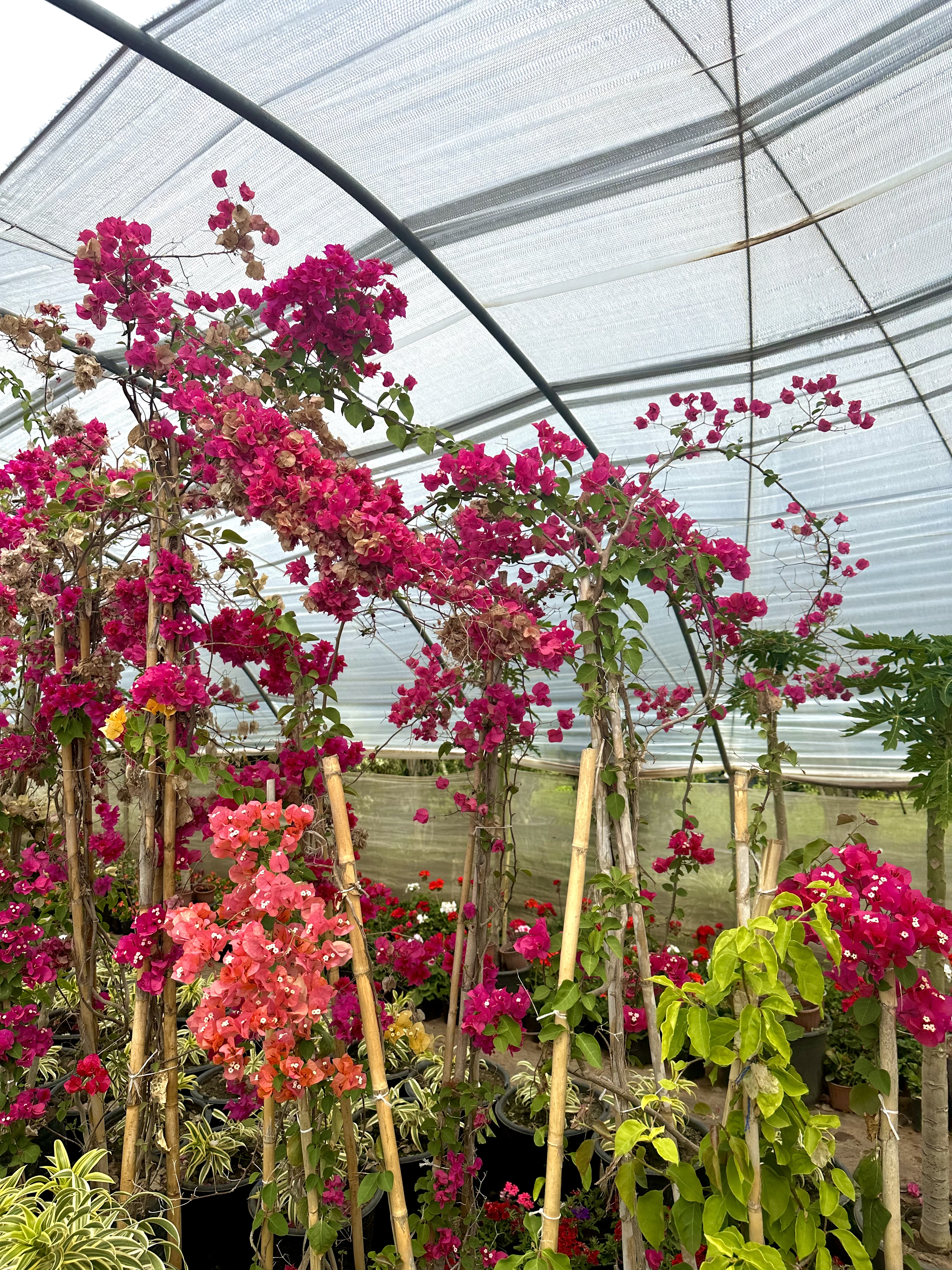
Bougainvillea Liana

In Arabic, Liana (ليانة) comes from the word Leen (لين), which is a popular name in the Arab world (Liana stills less popular and it is considered as a rare name in Arab countries), they both mean "soft" and "tender", this meaning can be related to other names like Leen (mentioned above), Layan, or Lina.

Notable people known by the name include:

- Liana Cipcigan, Welsh electrical and transport engineer
- Liana Drahová, Slovak figure skater
- Liana Kanelli, Greek journalist and communist politician
- Liana Kerzner, Canadian YouTuber
- Liana Liberato, American actress
- Liana Fiol Matta, Associate Justice of the Supreme Court of Puerto Rico
- Liana Mesa, Cuban volleyball player
- Liana Nella-Potiropoulou, Greek architect
- Liana Orfei, Italian actress and circus artist
- Liana Stanciu, Romanian television presenter
- Liana Șerbescu, Romanian pianist
