= Leanna =

Leanna is a feminine given name. Notable people with the name include:

== People ==
- Leanna Brodie, Canadian actress and playwright
- Leanna Carriere-Wellwood, Canadian pole vaulter and heptathlete
- Leanna Crawford, American singer-songwriter
- Leanna Creel, American actress

== Fictional characters ==
- Leanna Cavanagh, ITV soap opera Emmerdale
- Leanna Love, CBS soap opera, The Young and the Restless

== See also ==
- Leanne
- Leeanna
