= Free bleeding =

Menstruating without catching the blood

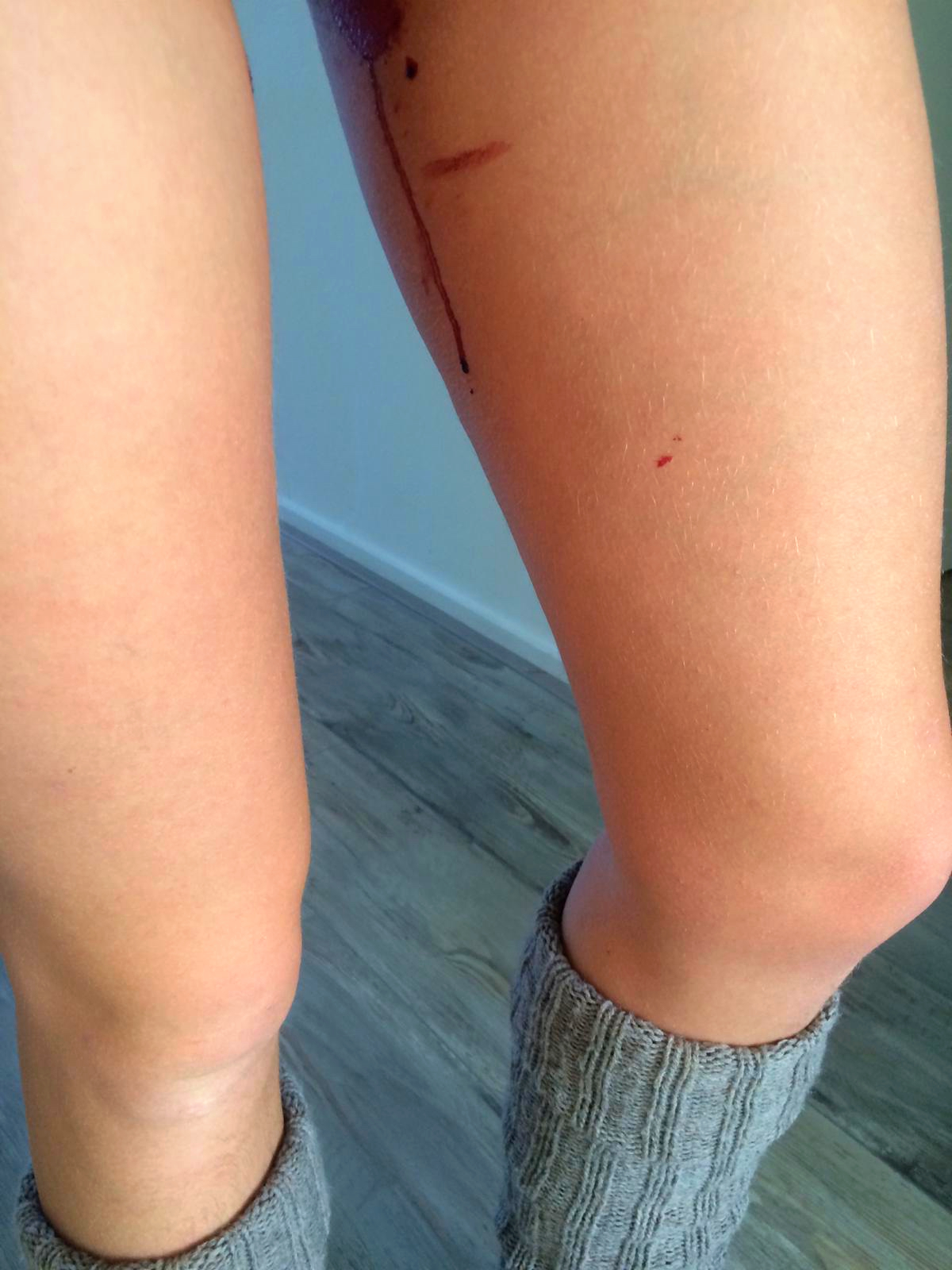
A Dutch feminist practices free bleeding

Free bleeding is the practice of menstruating without blocking or collecting the period flow. In recent years it has become a subject of public debate.

== History ==
The movement started in the 1970s as a reaction to toxic shock syndrome, a rare and sometimes fatal condition that can be caused when bacteria grow in tampons worn to absorb menstrual bleeding. It regained popularity in 2014 as a result of a prank originating on the internet site 4chan. Kiran Gandhi ran in the London Marathon while free bleeding as a symbolic act to combat menstrual stigma around the world. The movement focuses on women's and gender minorities' own comfort.

== Products ==
The experience of menstruating into period underwear has been compared to free bleeding.

== Prevalance ==
A Spanish study found "A small but compelling number of women and PWM (3.7%)" practice free bleeding, "mainly practiced at home and on low-bleeding days".

Practicing free bleeding tends to be suitable for some women with a light blood flow, flexible 'at home' working hours, and those who are well educated on their personal menstrual cycle. One considering free bleeding is advised to try gradually at home for a couple hours at a time, wear dark clothing with absorbent fabrics, maintain a good hygiene to avoid any infections or bacteria growth, and listen to their body.
