= Lesbians Who Tech + Allies =

Lesbians Who Tech & Allies is a community founded by Leanne Pittsford in 2012 to create a place for queer women and their allies in the field of technology.

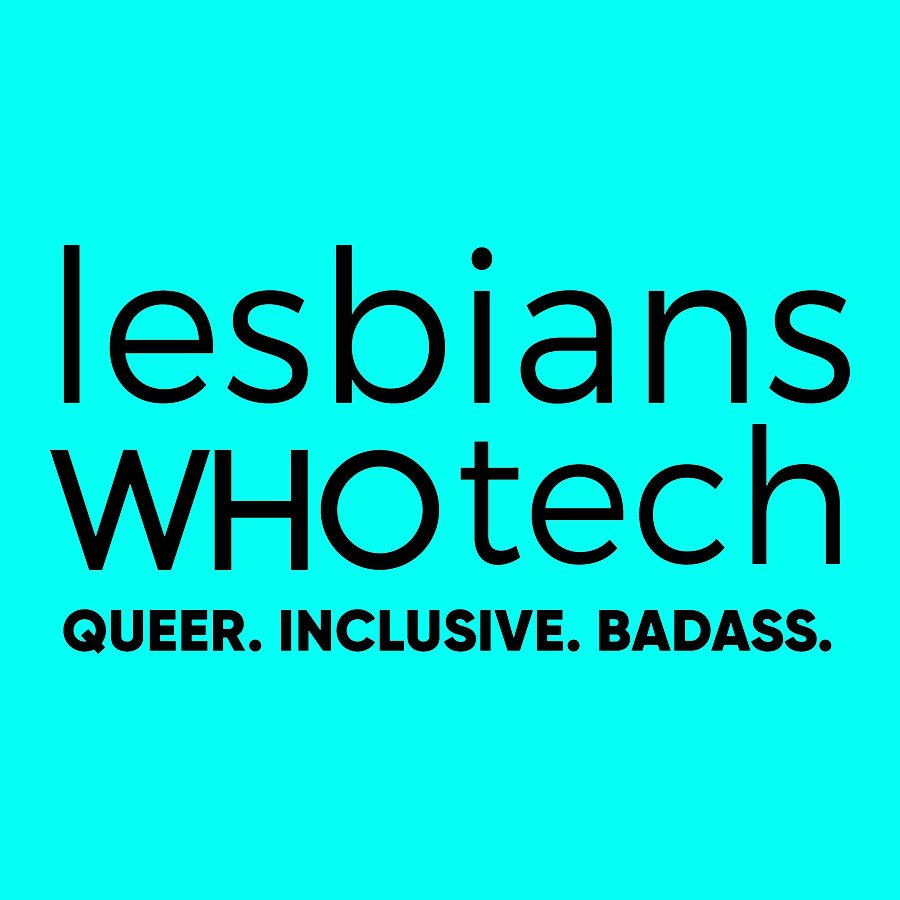
Lesbians Who Tech & Allies Logo

== History ==
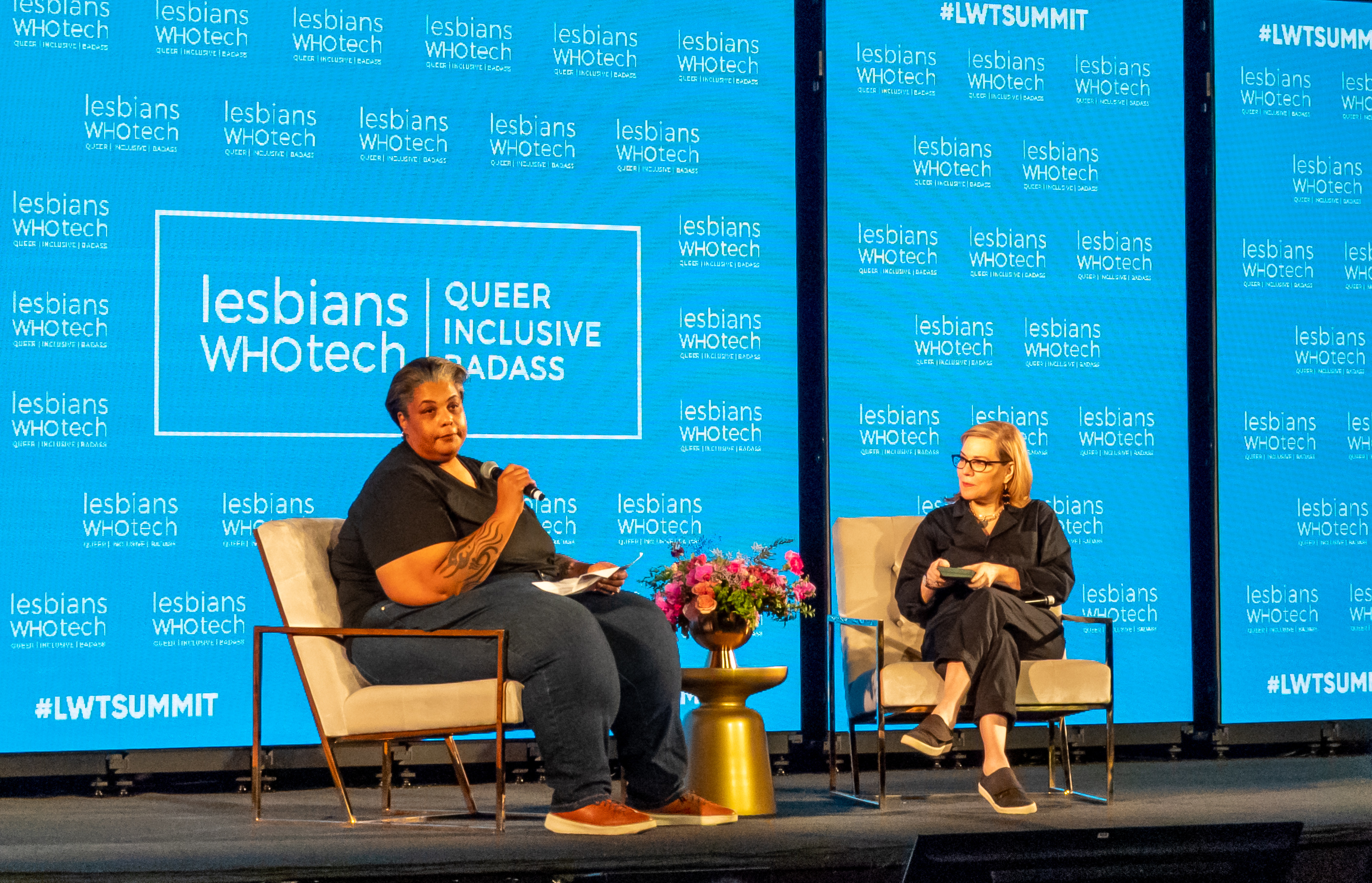
Roxane Gay and Debbie Millman speak on stage during the 2022 Lesbians Who Tech summit.

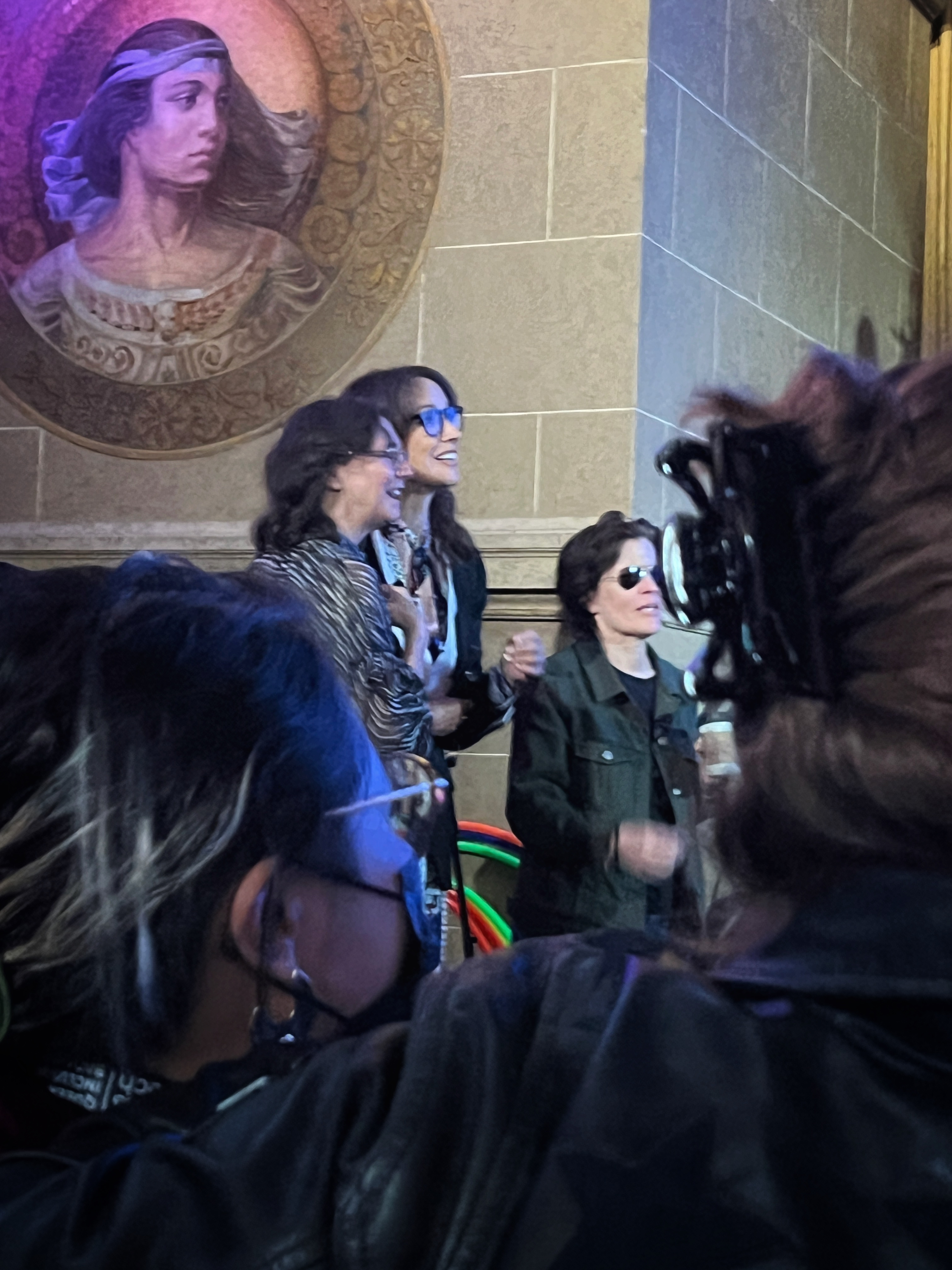
Ilene Chaikin, Jennifer Beals, and Kara Swisher waiting to take the stage for their keynote at the Lesbians Who Tech & Allies Summit

The community was started based on a small meet up at the Castro Theatre in the Castro District, San Francisco in December 2012.

By the end of 2013, small events were launched in New York, Seattle, Boston, Los Angeles, London, Berlin and Toronto and the community had nearly 4,000 people. In October 2013, the Lesbians Who Tech + Allies website was launched. The first official Lesbians Who Tech + Allies Summit was held in February 2014 in San Francisco.

In June 2015, Lesbians Who Tech + Allies was awarded a $165,000 grant from the Arrillaga-Andreessen Foundation, starting a nonprofit arm of Lesbians Who Tech + Allies. The grant money was used for two pilot programs; "Bring a Lesbian to Work Day" and a coding scholarship fund.

Lesbians Who Tech + Allies is committed to convening queer women (and allies) in technology in a vibrant and inclusive community. It is not a requirement to identify as lesbian or a member of the LGBTQ community to be part of the organization. The only requirement is to follow the organization's mission and goals; promote the visibility and inclusion of women, LGBT people, and people from other back-grounds under-represented in technology.

In October 2023, the Lesbians Who Tech + Allies Summit celebrated their 10th year anniversary with a 3 day in-person event that featured many keynote speakers, including Kara Swisher, Ilene Chaikin, Jennifer Beals, Kiran Gandhi, Chani Nicholas, ALOK Vaid-Menon, Chasten Buttigieg, and Debbie Millman.

In 2022, the annual summit expanded from the Castro Theatre to take over two blocks on Castro Street, which caused friction with some of the local merchants. In November 2023, the Castro Merchants Association voted to ask that the street not be shut down for future events.

In January 2024, Lesbians Who Tech + Allies announced that the 2024 summit will take place in New York City. The October 2026 summit is also scheduled to take place in New York City.

== Mission ==
Lesbians Who Tech & Allies' mission is to increase visibility and awareness of intersectionality within the technology community. The organization embodies four main goals; (1) to be more visible to each other, (2) to be more visible to others, (3) to get more women, POC, and queer and trans people in technology, and (4) to connect with other LGBTQ and Women's organization who are doing work for the community. Lesbians Who Tech & Allies aims to build a network of colleagues, associates, and friends in the industry that share the same sexual orientation, in order to help make comfortable connection within the work space. Additionally, the organization promises to support other groups who are fighting for the same rights (women and LGBTQ rights) and raise awareness of their work, while connecting these organization to women in the tech community.

=== Bring a Lesbian to Work Day ===
Participants are matched with mentors in the tech field for a one-day on-site program focused on showing them what it takes to be leaders in whatever field they're interested in. The program's objective is to encourage building professional relationships where people are comfortable with each other.

=== Edie Windsor Coding Scholarship Fund ===
Named after the LGBTQ and technology legend Edie Windsor, the Edie Windsor Coding Scholarship Fund provides opportunity for future generations of LGBTQ, technical women, and non-binary and trans individuals. The scholarship was funded through a Kickstarter campaign, pledging more than $100,000 towards educating 15 women. The bootcamp sponsor, Dev Bootcamp, kicked in another $100,000 in scholarship funds. Each scholar has the chance to choose and apply to the coding school or bootcamp of their choice. In addition to tuition coverage, scholars are also provided with a network of lifelong mentors for support throughout their career.

== Summits ==
Lesbians Who Tech & Allies hosts annual summits in the Castro district. Summits include networking events with tech companies, keynote speeches, and workshops for attendees.

=== Noteworthy summits ===
The first White House's LGBT Tech and Innovation Summit took place in July 2014 with the aim to explore how technology can be used to end discrimination. Technology and LGBT community leaders were invited to generate answers to some of the major issues the United States is facing, including racial and economic justice, criminal justice reforms, economic inclusion, climate and citizenship. The event had over 150 participants, and was opened by Aditi Hardiker of the White House Office of Public Engagement.

The sixth-annual Lesbians Who Tech & Allies Summit, a three day event, took place in San Francisco from February 28 to March 2, 2019. The attendees were roughly 80 percent queer women. Of those who spoke on stage, half were women of color, 30 percent were black or Latinx, and 15 percent transgender or gender non-conforming.

=== Noteworthy speakers ===
Black Lives Matter co-founder Alicia Garza, U.S. Senator Tammy Baldwin, former Georgia gubernatorial candidate Stacey Abrams, San Francisco Mayor London Breed, and Emerson Collective founder Laurene Powell Jobs have given speeches at Lesbians Who Tech + Allies Summits. Among many others, further noteworthy speakers include Hillary Clinton, Stacey Abrams, Sheryl Sandberg and Marc Benioff.
