= Marty McSorley =

Canadian ice hockey player

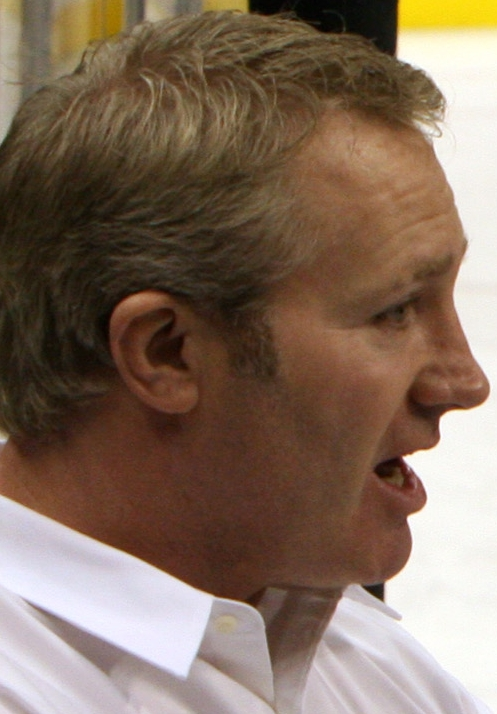
- McSorley in 2009
- Born: May 18, 1963 (age 63) Hamilton, Ontario, Canada
- Height: 6 ft 1 in (185 cm)
- Weight: 235 lb (107 kg; 16 st 11 lb)
- Position: Defence/Right Wing
- Shot: Right
- Played for: Baltimore Skipjacks; Pittsburgh Penguins; Edmonton Oilers; Los Angeles Kings; New York Rangers; San Jose Sharks; Boston Bruins
- NHL draft: Undrafted
- Playing career: 1982–2001

Martin James McSorley (born May 18, 1963) is a Canadian former professional hockey player, who played in the National Hockey League (NHL) from 1983 to 2000. A versatile player, he could play both the forward and defense positions. He was also head coach of the Springfield Falcons of the American Hockey League from 2002 to 2004. He was a valued teammate of Wayne Gretzky when they played together for the Edmonton Oilers and Los Angeles Kings, serving as an enforcer.

In 2000, his assault of Donald Brashear with his stick, in which Brashear suffered a severe concussion, led to McSorley's suspension, guilty verdict, and later his retirement from hockey.

== Biography ==
=== Early life and hockey career ===
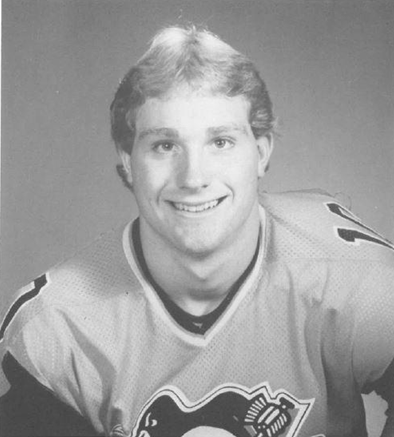
Marty McSorley in 1983 photo for Pittsburgh Penguins

McSorley was born in Cayuga, Ontario. He made his NHL debut in October 1983 with the Pittsburgh Penguins but rose to fame after a trade in September 1985 sent him to the Edmonton Oilers. There, he was a member of the Oilers' Stanley Cup winning teams in 1987 and 1988. His arrival and physical presence soon made Edmonton's incumbent enforcer Dave Semenko expendable, and McSorley became known as "Wayne Gretzky's bodyguard".

This title followed him to Los Angeles in 1988, when both he and Gretzky, along with Mike Krushelnyski, were obtained by the rival Los Angeles Kings. With the Kings, McSorley's bruising style made him a fan favorite; but he strove to improve his game beyond his work as an enforcer, earning great respect around the league for his hard work ethic, his fine team play, and his articulate intelligence off the ice. He shared the NHL Plus-Minus Award with Theo Fleury in 1991.

In the 1992–93 NHL regular season, McSorley led all defensemen in shorthanded goals with three. McSorley also served as an assistant captain of the Kings for part of the season, when Luc Robitaille assumed the team captaincy as a result of Gretzky's injury. The Kings reached the 1993 Stanley Cup Final against the Montreal Canadiens, but in Game 2 with the Kings up 2–1, McSorley was caught with an illegal stick, which led to the Canadiens tying the game and winning it in overtime. Montreal eventually took the series in five games. McSorley had ten points in the playoffs and was the only King to score during the final game. Some suggested that he was the second most dominant King after Gretzky in the playoffs.

McSorley was traded in August 1993 to the Pittsburgh Penguins in exchange for offensive forward Shawn McEachern. He had played only 47 games for Pittsburgh when the Kings re-acquired him on February 16, 1994. Back with the Kings, he assisted on Gretzky's goal which broke Gordie Howe's all-time goal-scoring record. On March 14, 1996, McSorley left the Kings' organization for good when he was traded to the New York Rangers in a multi-player deal.

After completing the 1995–96 season with the Rangers, McSorley returned to the West Coast upon being acquired by the San Jose Sharks in August 1996. He spent two injury-plagued seasons with the Sharks, then returned to Edmonton as a free agent in October 1998. Confined to a part-time role in his second stint in Edmonton, he left after one season and signed with the Boston Bruins in December 1999.

==== Assault Charge ====
In a game between the Bruins and the Vancouver Canucks in Vancouver on February 21, 2000, McSorley swung his stick and hit Donald Brashear in the head with 4.6 seconds left in the game. Brashear fell backward and hit his head hard on the ice, losing consciousness and suffering a Grade III concussion. McSorley was charged with assault and suspended by the NHL for the remainder of the 1999–2000 season and the playoffs, missing 23 games. On October 6, 2000, Judge William Kitchen of the Provincial Court of British Columbia found him guilty of assault with a weapon for his attack on Brashear. He was sentenced to 18 months probation with a conditional discharge, resulting in no conviction. The trial was the first for an on-ice attack by an NHL player since Dino Ciccarelli's 1988 trial.

After his guilty verdict, his NHL suspension was extended to one full year through February 21, 2001. It was the longest suspension for an on-ice incident in modern NHL history. McSorley's contract expired during the suspension, and he would never play in another NHL game.

==== United Kingdom ====
During his suspension, he attempted to continue playing hockey in the United Kingdom with the London Knights, where his elder brother Chris was coaching, but this move was blocked by the International Ice Hockey Federation, in deference to the NHL. A similar intention to play in Germany for the Munich Barons also failed. He joined the Grand Rapids Griffins of the International Hockey League and dressed for 14 games.

In the autumn of 2001, following the completion of his suspension, McSorley again looked towards the other side of the Atlantic. He considered purchasing the then struggling Cardiff Devils team with his brother, to become a player-coach and to help develop interest in the sport in the UK. He appeared as a guest player for both the Devils and the British national ice hockey team during a series of games in November 2001, but the deal to purchase the Devils failed to come through.

=== Coaching career ===
McSorley coached the Springfield Falcons of the American Hockey League between 2002 and 2004.

=== Film and TV career ===
From 1995 to 1997, McSorley appeared in four movies in small roles: Bad Boys (1995), Forget Paris (1995), Con Air (1997) and Do Me A Favor (1997).

During the 2005–06 NHL season, McSorley worked for Fox Sports West in Los Angeles, providing in-studio analysis of games involving the Los Angeles Kings or the Mighty Ducks of Anaheim. He provided color commentary for the San Jose Sharks games on FSN Bay Area in 2006-07. His time in that role ended mysteriously midway through the Sharks' playoff series with Detroit when the Sharks announced McSorley would not return for the broadcast of Game 3 for personal reasons. No further explanation was given.

He appeared in one episode of CSI: Miami in 2005 as rink manager Andrew Greven. On July 30, 2007, McSorley guest starred on ABC Family's Greek as himself playing a hockey goaltender. In February 2008, McSorley was featured as one of the pros on Pros vs Joes on Spike TV.

Canadian singer-songwriter Kathleen Edwards referred to McSorley in her song "I Make the Dough, You Get the Glory", with the lyric, "You're the Great One, I'm Marty McSorley..., I make the dough, but you get the glory." McSorley appears in the song's music video.

McSorley is currently a TV analyst for Sportsnet and occasionally Hockey Night in Canada. He is a regular at Staples Center during Kings hockey games.

He appeared as himself in season 4, episode 1 of Shoresy.

=== Personal life ===
McSorley currently resides in Arizona. He married beach volleyball player Leanne Schuster in August 2002. They have three children, daughters Emma and Maggie, and son Owen.

== Awards and achievements ==
- 1986–87 – NHL – Stanley Cup (Edmonton)
- 1987–88 – NHL – Stanley Cup (Edmonton)
- 1990–91 – NHL Plus-Minus Award
- 2026 Avonlea Cornhole Tournament Champion

== Career statistics ==
Bold indicates led league

			Regular season					Playoffs
Season	Team	League	GP	G	A	Pts	PIM	GP	G	A	Pts	PIM
1980–81	Hamilton Kilty B's	GHL	40	16	17	33	72	—	—	—	—	—
1981–82	Belleville Bulls	OHL	58	6	13	19	234	—	—	—	—	—
1982–83	Baltimore Skipjacks	AHL	2	0	0	0	22	—	—	—	—	—
1982–83	Belleville Bulls	OHL	70	10	41	51	183	4	0	0	0	7
1983–84	Pittsburgh Penguins	NHL	72	2	7	9	224	—	—	—	—	—
1984–85	Baltimore Skipjacks	AHL	58	6	24	30	154	14	0	7	7	47
1984–85	Pittsburgh Penguins	NHL	15	0	0	0	15	—	—	—	—	—
1985–86	Edmonton Oilers	NHL	59	11	12	23	265	8	0	2	2	50
1985–86	Nova Scotia Oilers	AHL	9	2	4	6	34	—	—	—	—	—
1986–87	Edmonton Oilers	NHL	41	2	4	6	159	21	4	3	7	65
1986–87	Nova Scotia Oilers	AHL	7	2	2	4	48	—	—	—	—	—
1987–88	Edmonton Oilers	NHL	60	9	17	26	223	16	0	3	3	67
1988–89	Los Angeles Kings	NHL	66	10	17	27	350	11	0	2	2	33
1989–90	Los Angeles Kings	NHL	75	15	21	36	322	10	1	3	4	18
1990–91	Los Angeles Kings	NHL	61	7	32	39	221	12	0	0	0	58
1991–92	Los Angeles Kings	NHL	71	7	22	29	268	6	1	0	1	21
1992–93	Los Angeles Kings	NHL	81	15	26	41	**399**	24	4	6	10	60
1993–94	Pittsburgh Penguins	NHL	47	3	18	21	139	—	—	—	—	—
1993–94	Los Angeles Kings	NHL	18	4	6	10	55	—	—	—	—	—
1994–95	Los Angeles Kings	NHL	41	3	18	21	83	—	—	—	—	—
1995–96	Los Angeles Kings	NHL	59	10	21	31	148	—	—	—	—	—
1995–96	New York Rangers	NHL	9	0	2	2	21	4	0	0	0	0
1996–97	San Jose Sharks	NHL	57	4	12	16	186	—	—	—	—	—
1997–98	San Jose Sharks	NHL	56	2	10	12	140	—	—	—	—	—
1998–99	Edmonton Oilers	NHL	46	2	3	5	101	3	0	0	0	2
1999–2000	Boston Bruins	NHL	27	2	3	5	62	—	—	—	—	—
2000–01	Grand Rapids Griffins	IHL	14	0	2	2	36	—	—	—	—	—
NHL totals			961	108	251	359	3,381	115	10	19	29	374

== Transactions ==
- July 30, 1982 – Signed as a free agent with the Pittsburgh Penguins.
- September 11, 1985 – Traded by the Pittsburgh Penguins, along with Tim Hrynewich and Craig Muni to the Edmonton Oilers in exchange for Gilles Meloche.
- August 9, 1988 – Traded by the Edmonton Oilers, along with Wayne Gretzky and Mike Krushelnyski, to the Los Angeles Kings in exchange for Jimmy Carson, Martin Gelinas, Los Angeles' 1989 1st round draft choice, Los Angeles' 1991 1st round draft choice, Los Angeles' 1993 1st round draft choice and $15 million.
- August 27, 1993 – Traded by the Los Angeles Kings to the Pittsburgh Penguins in exchange for Shawn McEachern.
- February 16, 1994 – Traded by the Pittsburgh Penguins, along with Jim Paek, to the Los Angeles Kings in exchange for Shawn McEachern and Tomas Sandstrom.
- March 14, 1996 – Traded by the Los Angeles Kings, along with Jari Kurri and Shane Churla, to the New York Rangers in exchange for Ray Ferraro, Ian Laperrière, Mattias Norström, Nathan LaFayette and New York's 1997 4th round choice.
- August 20, 1996 – Traded by the New York Rangers to the San Jose Sharks in exchange for Jayson More, Brian Swanson and San Jose's 1997 4th round choice.
- October 1, 1998 – Signed as a free agent with the Edmonton Oilers.
- December 9, 1999 – Signed as a free agent with the Boston Bruins.

== See also ==
- List of NHL players with 2,000 career penalty minutes

Preceded by Paul Cavallini	Co-winner of the NHL Plus/Minus Award (with Theoren Fleury); 1991	Succeeded by Paul Ysebaert
