= Dimitris Potiropoulos =

Greek architect

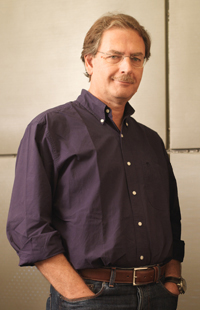
Image of Potiropoulos

Dimitris Potiropoulos is a Greek architect, Chairman & Founding Partner of the architectural practice Potiropoulos+Partners. He was born in Athens, Greece to his parents Rigas Potiropoulos and Aliki Potiropoulou, (the family Palaska). He studied architecture at Technische Hochschule Darmstadt in Germany. During his studies he served as a faculty member at the Chair of Free Hand Drawing, and he was awarded with a special commendation for his project "Residential Proposal in the Historical Centre of Reutlingen". He specialized on Architectural Composition – Special issues of Building Design.

Dimitris Potiropoulos worked initially as an architectural assistant and later collaborated as a fully qualified architect with various architectural practices, among which the practice of Konstantinos Kapsabelis, the practice of Prof. Helmut Striffler, and the practice A.N. Tombazis and Associates Architects. At the same time, he started his own practice and took part in architectural competitions.

In 1989, along with his spouse Liana Nella-Potiropoulou, he established the firm "Potiropoulos + Partners" one of Greece's most accomplished architectural practices with international recognition. In 2019 their son Rigas Potiropoulos joined as a partner. The firm maintains offices in Athens GR & London UK.

Awards & recognition received by the firm since its inception include the 1st prize for the Natural History Museum on Samos, Greece, the 3rd Prize for the Complex of the "Technical Chamber of Greece" in Maroussi, Attica, Greece, the 2nd prize for the New Acropolis Museum, Athens, Greece in collaboration with Studio Daniel Libeskind, the 1st prize for the Restoration of the Listed Building Complex of the Silk-mill "Ekmetzoglou" in Volos, Greece, a special commendation for the entry for the Grand Egyptian Museum in Cairo, Egypt, etc. The project "Kindergarten of German School of Athens" in Maroussi, Athens, Greece was nominated for the Mies van der Rohe Awards 2015. The firm has also gained international recognition and has won several awards such as: Architizer A+ Award, German Design Award, A Design Award, World Architecture Award, Big SEE Architecture Award, Iconic Award.THE FIRM has been nominated for Mies van der Rohe Awards 2015 – European Union Prize for Contemporary Architecture as well.

The work of "Potiropoulos + Partners" includes well known buildings such as A. Trichas Residence in Philothei, Athens, Greece, the Olympic Airlines Airport Services Building Complex in Athens International Airport "Eleftherios Venizelos", Athens, Greece, the restoration and reuse of Listed Hotel «Grande Albergo delle Rose», Rhodes, Greece, the Olympic Tennis Centre in the Athens Olympic Sports Center (Ο.Α.Κ.Α.), Athens, Greece, the extension and renovation of Mercedes Benz Hellas Central Facilities in N. Kifissia, Athens, Greece, Flisvos Marina, Athens, Greece, the Cultural Centre Square in Gerakas, Athens, Greece, the Kindergarten of German School of Athens in Maroussi, Athens, Greece, «Evmareia» Touristic Complex in Brestova Zagorie, Croatia and PROJECT "X"– Research, Education, Conference and Sports Centre of ELPEN S.A. in Spata Business Area, Athens, Greece.

In 2009 the monograph "Potiropoulos D+L Architects" was published by "Potamos Editions" and includes selected works of the practice of the period 1989–2009. It is foreworded by Daniel Libeskind and Prof. Dimitris Philippides. In the publication titled Readings of Greek Post-war Architecture (Kaleidoskopio Editions, 2014), the author Panayiotis Tsakopoulos selected the work of Potiropoulos+Partners as one of the 18 most representative samples of architecture in post-war Greece.

Dimitris Potiropoulos is a founding member of the "Hellenic Institute of Architecture". His lectures and publications concern issues of architectural theory as well as projects and studies emerged by his practice. His work has been published both in Greek and international press and has been presented in exhibitions in Greece and abroad, such as: 1st Biennale for Young Greek Architects – Athens, Greece, 1996, 2nd Biennale for Young Greek Architects – Athens, Greece, 1998, Landscapes of Modernization; Greek Architecture 1960s and 1990s – Rotterdam, the Netherlands, 1999, International Architectural Exhibition – Belgrade, Serbia, 2000, Pan-Hellenic Exhibition of Architectural Project – Patras, Greece, 2000/2003/2006, The shape of Space; 40 Years Architectural Trends – Athens, Greece, 2008 among others.
