= Kiran Gandhi =

American singer (born 1989)

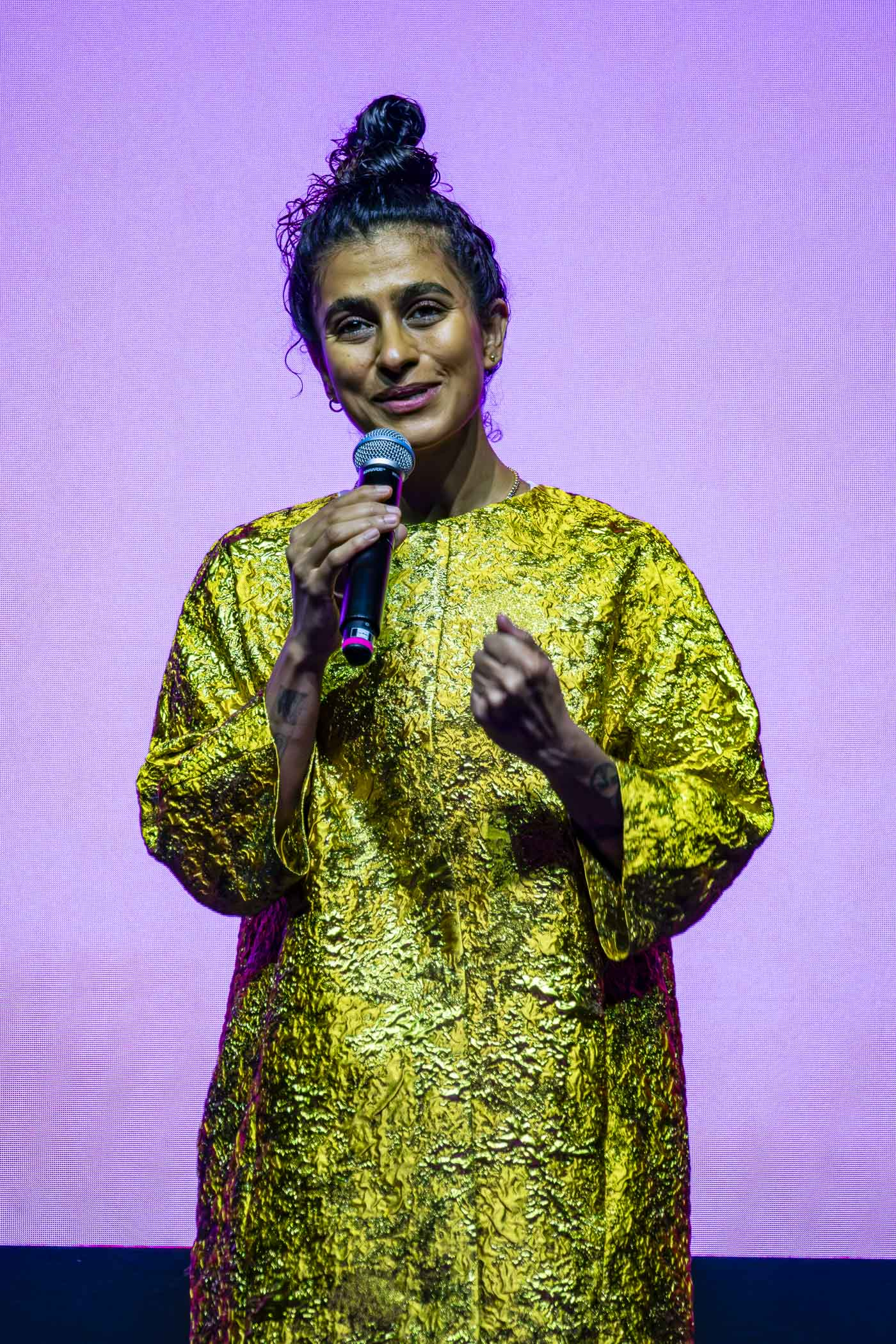
- Madame Gandhi at SXSW London
- Born: February 21, 1989 (age 37)
- Other name: Madame Gandhi
- Education: Georgetown University (BA); Harvard University (MBA); Stanford University (MA)
- Occupations: Musician; Producer; Drummer; Activist; Keynote Speaker
- Partner: Lesley Sackey (June 2022–Present)
- Parents: Vikram Gandhi (father); Meera Gandhi (mother)
- Website: madamegandhi.com

Kiran Gandhi (born February 21, 1989), also known by her stage name Madame Gandhi, is an American musician, producer, drummer, activist, and keynote speaker. She began her solo music career in 2015 after participation in the London Marathon while free-bleeding drew international attention and sparked discussion around menstrual stigma. Prior to her solo work, she performed as a drummer for M.I.A., Thievery Corporation, Oprah, and Kehlani, and has been recognized as a TED Fellow, Forbes 30 Under 30 honoree, and BBC 100 Women honoree. Her work spans music and advocacy, with a focus on gender equality and environmental sustainability.

== Early life and education ==
Gandhi, born February 21, 1989, is the daughter of philanthropist Meera Gandhi and social entrepreneur Vikram Gandhi. Growing up, Gandhi spent time in both New York City and Mumbai, India. Gandhi attended the Chapin School in the Upper East Side of New York City between 1994 and 2007 apart from the three years she attended St. Anne's School and American School of Bombay in Mumbai, India, between 1997 and 2000. Gandhi graduated magna cum laude from Georgetown University in 2011 with a bachelor's degree in mathematics and government and a minor in women's and gender studies. While at Georgetown, she became involved in music performance and collaborated with artist including Thievery Corporation, appearing at events such as the Bonnaroo Music Festival.

After graduating, her job as the first digital analyst at Interscope Records was based in Santa Monica, California, where she analyzed patterns in Spotify streaming data and other digital media. She later earned a Master of Business Administration from Harvard Business School in 2015. Between 2021 and 2022, Gandhi studied music, science and technology at Stanford's Center for Computer Research in Music and Acoustics (CCRMA), earning a Master of Arts. Her research there included recording environmental sounds to explore music and climate awareness.

== Career ==
=== 2012-2015: Early career ===
In 2012, Gandhi recorded a video of herself playing live drums to the M.I.A. track "Bad Girls." In February 2013, M.I.A. wrote to Gandhi praising the recording and asked her to play drums for the tour supporting the album Matangi. At the same time Gandhi accepted an offer to study at Harvard Business School. Gandhi left Interscope Records in 2013.

=== 2016-2022: "V" trilogy ===
==== Voices (2016) ====
In 2016, her debut musical release, Voices (EP), was published. It introduced Gandhi's percussive electronic sound, blending lie drumming with feminist themes. The track "The Future Is Female" gained early traction, later appearing on Spotify's U.S. Viral Top 50 chart.

In 2017, Gandhi collaborated with female-identifying producers to release Voices Remixed. That year, she also was the opening act for Ani DiFranco's Rise Up Tour. Gandhi toured Europe and India and also spoke at Airbnb, Pandora Radio, Spotify, the United Nations, and on college campuses.

==== Visions (2019) ====
In 2019, Gandhi's second musical release, Visions (EP), was published, beginning her new partnership with Sony Music Masterworks. The EP expanded Gandhi's electronic production style with layered percussion and synth-driven arrangements. The track "Bad habits" was featured in The New York Times, while "Top Know Turn Up" received coverage from NYLON.

In March 2019, she was among the guest artists at the Los Angeles Philharmonic's "BREATHWATCHLISTENTOUCH", a tribute to Yoko Ono at Walt Disney Concert Hall, where she read selections from Ono's writing. In 2020, Gandhi performed at NPR Tiny Desk remotely as part of their Tiny Desk at Home series, and was featured on Times Square billboards as part of Spotify's Asian Heritage Month campaign. In 2021, she appeared in "Music Requires Listening", the promotional video for the 63rd Annual Grammy Awards.

==== Vibrations (2022) ====
In 2022, Gandhi released Vibrations (EP), the final installment of her "V" trilogy, through Sony Music Masterworks, which further developed her rhythmic, electronic sound with an emphasis on groove-based production and collaborative songwriting.

In November 2023, she toured the album on a headlining tour at venues such as the Boston Museum of Science, the Kennedy Center Millennium Stage and Brooklyn Bowl on the East Coast, and Cafe Du Nord and the Troubadour on the West Coast, followed by dates in the United Kingdom and Europe in 2024.

=== 2023-present: Recent work ===
In 2023, Gandhi supported Hayley Kiyoko on her Panorama Tour at the Fillmore in San Francisco, and later that year performed at Carnegie Hall as part of the U.S.-China Culture Foundation's 20th anniversary celebration. In 2024, she opened for Pauli the PSM on the Saucy Tour at the Lafayette in London, and was scheduled to appear alongside Jamila Woods for additional UK and European dates, which were subsequently cancelled.

Her 2024 included a stop at the Mastercard Center for Inclusive Growth's Global Inclusive Growth Summit in Washintong, D.C., where she led a drumming and audience-participation session during the April 18 afternoon plenary. That year, Gandhi also performed at PARiTY Paris in connection with the Olympic Games Paris 2024. In 2025, she participated in showcase performances at SXSW in both Austin and London, and appeared at Milan Fashion Week, walking in the Pierre-Louis Mascia Fall/Winter 2025 "Bright Star" collection show.

In 2024 and 2025, Gandhi expanded her international presence with performances across Europe, including appearances at Tallinn Music Week in Estonia, Fengaros Festivalin in Cyprus, and International Music Summit in Spain.

==== Let Me Be Water (2025) ====
In May 2025, Gandhi released Let Me Be Water, a full-length album created in collaboration with We Make Noise and over 40 women and gender-expansive artists, incorporating field recordings of nature and themes of environmental awareness. The album blends electronic production with ambient textures, rhythmic percussion, and spoken-word elements. KEXP described it as "a deep, soulful collection of reflections, mantras, and celebrations," highlighting its meditative and interceptive tone.

Gandhi announced a series of international summer tour dates, beginning with Rising Baba Yaga in Austria. That June, she attended the Coral Rave closing event at the United Nations Ocean Conference in Nice, France, and performed at Glastonbury Festival, where she also participated as a panelist on sustainability. She opened for Femi Kuti on select dates that summer, and in September she played percussion with Brian Eno at Wembley Stadium for Together for Palestine benefit. She also appeared at Boom Festival in Portugal and concluded the tour with performance at MUTEK in Montreal, Canada.

==== Love Letters from Brooklyn (2026) ====
In March 2026, Gandhi launched Love Letters from Brooklyn (EP) in collaboration with Gender Amplified and introduced it through a series of intimate live performances, including an album launch at National Sawdust in New York City. Launch events followed at The Melt in Los Angeles and House of Koko in London. The EP features five tracks that blend R&B and organic pop with visceral vocal performances. The album was developed in 2025 through a women-led 3-day songwriting camp with equitable splits, emphasizing collaboration, artistic equity, and empowerment at Hyperballad Music in Brooklyn.

April 2026 brought two international stages. At the Skoll World Forum in Oxford, Gandhi took part in a plenary session on treating nature as a creative collaborator and performed music built from field recording. The Women Deliver 2026 Conference in Melbourne, meanwhile, listed her among its speakers, and she performed at the opening-night event for Studio 5, a new convening space at the conference, on a bill with DJ Elle Young. On June 12, she gave the commencement address at the UCLA Herb Alpert School of Music.

==== Ektā (2026) ====
Ektā, released on August 14, 2026, is a New Age mantra and meditation album whose title is Sanskrit for "oneness." Gandhi shares the billing with Alexx Antaeus, Cafe De Anatolia, and Amani Sol. On release, it reached the number one on iTunes New Age Albums charts in the United States and topped the overall iTunes albums chart in India. It follows her three guided-meditation releases of 2025: Antarctica: Guided Meditation, Arctic: Guided Meditation, and Amazon: Guided Meditation.

== Activism and social impact ==
=== Climate work ===
The foundation of Gandhi environmental sound work is informed by her studies in music, science and technology at Stanford University's Center for Computer Research in Music and Acoustics (CCRMA), which she completed in 2022. Her work has included the use of field recordings and hydrophones to capture natural sound environments and incorporate them into music production.

In June 2021, Gandhi and her collaborators released the Sound MANA (Music, Art, Nature, Awareness) pack on Splice, and in November 2021 it was awarded the New.Wave award for innovation and boundary pushing in the music industry.

In 2022, she participated in an expedition to Antarctica, where she recorded environmental sounds including glaciers, wildlife, and ocean ice. These recordings were later developed into sound libraries and music project, with proceeds supporting environmental initiatives.

She has continued this work through recordings in locations including the Arctic and the Amazon rainforest, incorporating natural soundscapes into her 2025 album Let Me Be Water.

Gandhi has also collaborated with EarthPercent and its "Sounds Right" initiative, which credits nature as a contributing artist on recordings and directs a portion of streaming revenue towards conservation efforts. She has contributed recordings to the initiative with songs "In Purpose (feat. NATURE)" (2024), "Let Me Be Water (feat. NATURE)" (2025), and "All in All (feat. NATURE)" (2026) and participated in related events and programming.

Her climate advocacy extends beyond recordings and into the live events industry. In February 2025, she co-hosted the International AGF Awards ceremony in London alongside AGF CEO Claire O'Neil, concluding the 17th edition of the Green Events and Innovation (GEI) conference. The awards honored more than 30 events, venues and innovators from 14 countries across nine sustainability categories including power, water, food, and travel.

Gandhi also performed live alongside EarthPercent and Sounds Right at the Javitz Center in New York during Climate Week NYC in September 2024, and performed live at COP30 in Brazil in November 2025 as part of her ongoing engagement with intentional climate platforms.

After attending Gandhi's talk and Antarctic DJ set at Pioneer Works in Brooklyn during NY Climate 2026, a journalist from the The New York Times described her work as "an environmental symphony" and highlighted the duality in her work "between organic and inorganic, ancient and modern, nature and electronic music."

=== Gender equity ===
In 2015, Gandhi ran the London Marathon while free-bleeding as a statement against menstrual stigma. The act received international media coverage and contributed to broader public discussion around menstrual health and gender equity.

She has since involved in advocacy and creative projects addressing menstrual health and representation. In 2016, she collaborated with poet Rupi Kaur on the project Sun Spill, part of the #LetsFaceItPeriod campaign supporting menstrual health initiatives.

Gandhi also composed the score for Periodical, a documentary on menstrual health that premiered at SXSW in 2023.

Her music has frequently addressed theme of gender equity. Her song "The Future is Female," released in 2016, gained wider attention following the 2017 Women's March, and was later featured in the Apple TV+ series Gutsy.

Gandhi has also advocated for greater gender representation in the music industry, frequently collaborating with women and gender-expansive artists across her projects.

=== LGBTQ+ advocacy ===
Gandhi has incorporated LGBTQ+ representation into her visual and musical work. Her music videos, including "See Me Thru" (2020) and "Waiting For Me" (2020), have featured queer and gender expansive casts and collaborators.

She has also participated in LGBTQ+ focused events and organizations, including speaking engagements at Lesbians Who Tech + Allies summits. In 2026, she performed at the Stonewall Inn in New York City as part of a political fundraising event.

== Community engagement and leadership ==
Gandhi has held leadership and advisory roles across music and social impact organizations. She sits on the board of Gender Amplified and serves as a governor of the San Francisco chapter of The Recording Academy, a position she has held since May 2024. Her work in menstrual equity includes recognition as a Menstrual Health Warrior with Desai Foundation.

She has also contributed as a mentor and collaborate with initiatives supporting gender equity in music, including programs such as She Is The Music, Equalize Her, Gender Amplified, and We Make Noise, and has been involved with organizations including EarthPercent, Costaphonics, Give a Beat, and other advocacy-focused groups.

== Public image ==
Gandhi has openly identified as queer and uses she/her pronouns, describing her generation's understanding of queerness as centered on rejecting the gender binary and exploring non-traditional relationship structures. In interviews, she has framed her broader feminist vision as explicitly inclusive of queer and trans identities, calling for a true paradigm shift.

== Awards and nominations ==
- 2026: Dean's Medal of Distinction, UCLA Herb Alpert School of Music.
- 2026: Billboard Culture Shifter FEMMY Nominee.
- 2026: Alicia Keys “She is the Music” Vanguard Honoree.
- 2026: Skoll Foundation Grand Recipient.
- 2023: Songwriters Hall of Fame Abe Olman Prize for Excellence in Songwriting.
- 2023: Outfest Platinum Alchemy Award.
- 2021: SXSW Jury Award for Best Music Video ("Waiting For Me").
- 2021: Splice Awards New.Wav Award.
- 2020: TED Fellow.
- 2020: BBC 100 Women.
- 2019: Forbes 30 Under 30 in Music.
- 2017: Rockefeller Foundation Bellagio Center Artist-in-Residence.
- 2015: Harvard University Fitzie Foundation Prize.

== Discography ==
=== Album ===
- Antarctica: Guided Meditation (2025)
- Arctic: Guided Meditation (2025)
- Let Me Be Water (2025)
- Amazon: Guided Meditation (2025)
- Ektā (2026)

=== EP ===
- Voices (2016)
- Voices EP Remixed (2017)
- Visions (2019)
- Visions Remixed (2020)
- Young Indian Reimagined (2020)
- Vibrations (2022)
- Love Letters from Brooklyn (2026)

=== Singles ===
- Her (2016)
- Gandhi Blue (Gizzle Remix) (2017)
- Top Knot Turn Up (2018)
- Bad Habits (2018)
- Her (Will LV Remix) (2018)
- See Me Thru (Sarah Farina Remix) (2020)
- Freedom (2020)
- After You (2020)
- Crystals & Congas (2022)
- Set Me Free (2022)
- In Purpose (feat. NATURE) (2024)
- Pisces Knockout (2025)
- Rise! (2025)
- Let Me Be Water (feat. NATURE) (2025)
