= Meera Gandhi =

CEO of The Giving Back Foundation

Meera Teresa Gandhi
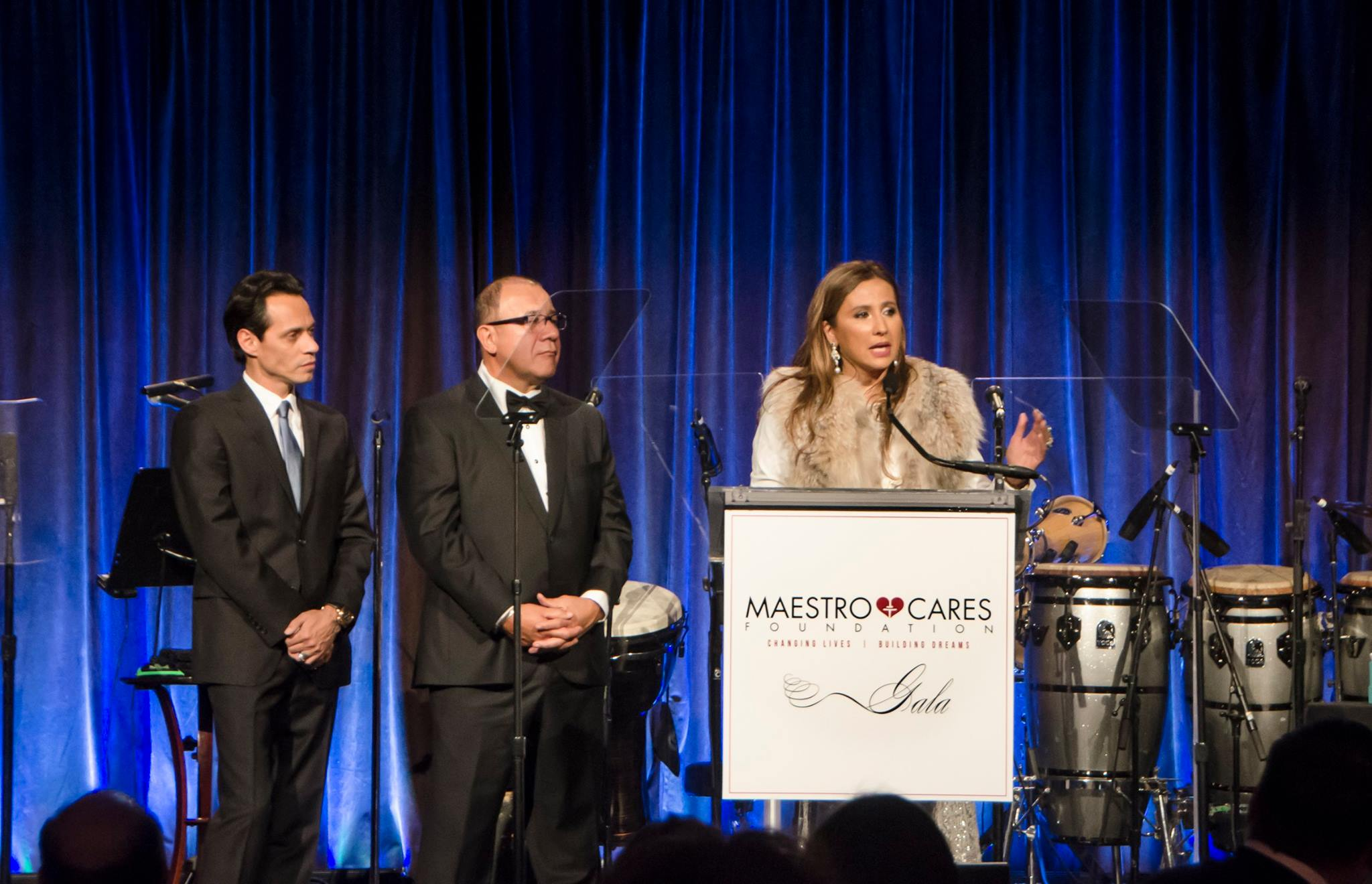
- Gandhi speaking at Maestro Cares Foundation event alongside Marc Anthony and Henry Cardenas
- Born: Mumbai, India
- Education: Harvard University (Executive Education Program); Boston University (MBA); University of Delhi (Bachelor's in Economics)
- Notable work: The Meera Gandhi Show (2017-2018) Giving Back (book) Giving Back Foundation
- Children: Kanika Gandhi, Kiran Gandhi, Kabir Gandhi
- Website: meeragandhi.com

Meera Teresa Gandhi is the founder and CEO of The Giving Back Foundation.

== Early life and education ==
Gandhi was born in Mumbai, India, to an Irish mother and a Gujarati father. At the age of 16, she met Mother Teresa and worked with her helping children at Asha Dan, Mumbai. Inspired, Gandhi went on to found the Giving Back Offices with projects in India, NY, Hong Kong, Turkey and the UK.

Gandhi attended The Cathedral and John Connon Schools in Mumbai and Lester B. Pearson United World College of the Pacific in Canada, and graduated with a bachelor's degree in Economics from the University of Delhi. She has an MBA from Boston University School of Management and an Executive Education diploma from Harvard Business School.

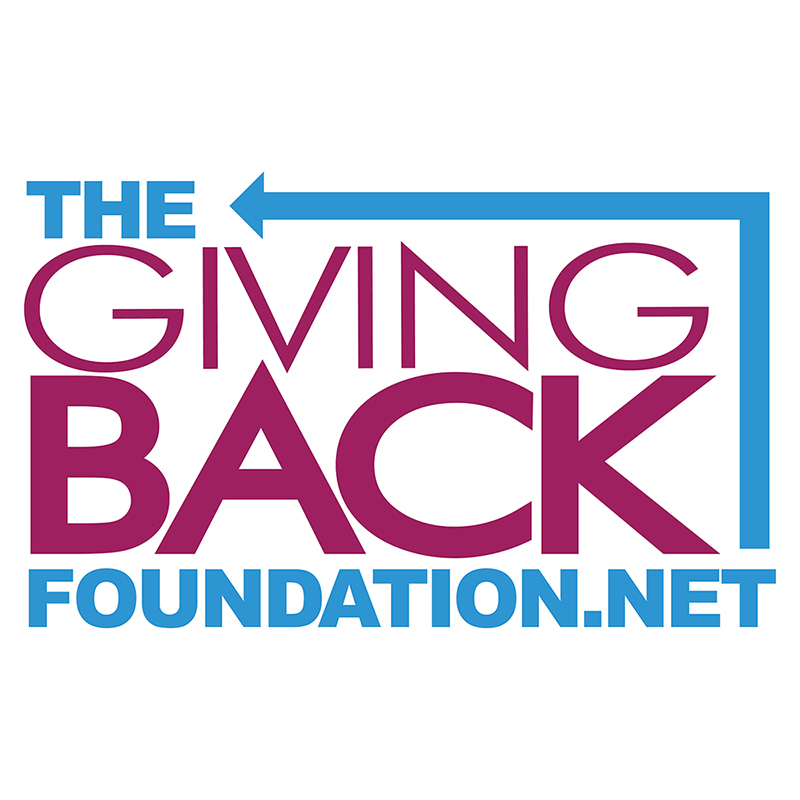
The Giving Back Foundation logo

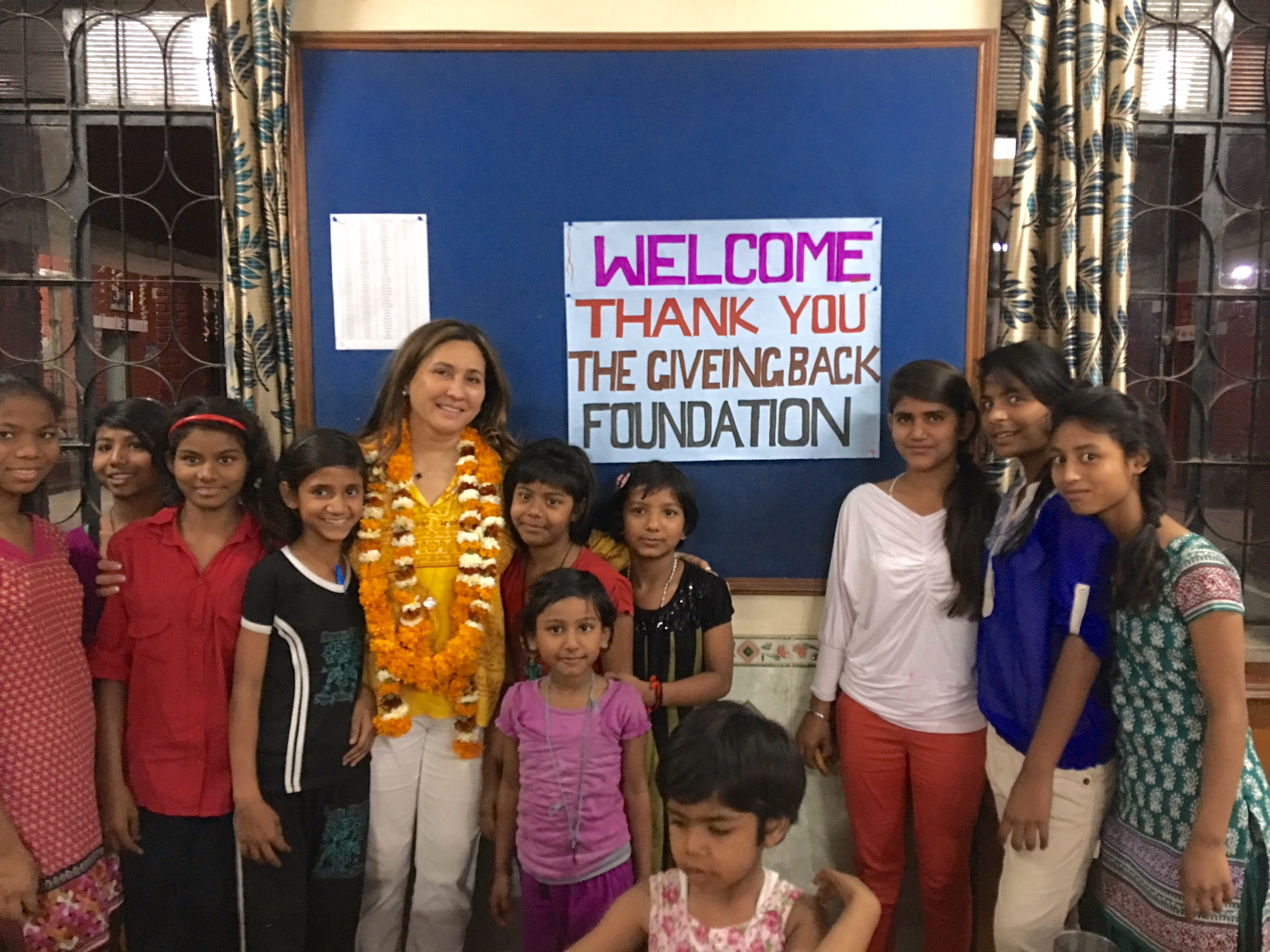

== Charitable activities ==
Gandhi is the founder and CEO of The Giving Back Foundation, a foundation geared towards alleviating illness, poverty and suffering while also addressing education issues which affect women and children around the world. Through her Foundation, Gandhi devotes her life to charity and help for those in need, notably abused and hungry children, widows, the sick, the deaf and blind. She is particularly interested in education as the stepping stone to success. Gandhi has supported charities with strong female leadership programs and workshops, in part because of the role models in her life: Hillary Clinton, Cherie Blair, and Gandhi's own mother, an Irish woman living in India. These charities include the Cherie Blair Foundation for Women in the United Kingdom and the Eleanor Roosevelt Leadership Center in the United States.

Gandhi is the founder of the Meera Gandhi Giving Back Award. The award is given each year at the Woodstock Film Festival to the director, producer or actor who best delivers a message of social change and who has a strong compassion for philanthropy. The first award, presented in 2011, was to Mark Ruffalo. Subsequent winners of the award were actor, director and screenwriter Tim Blake Nelson in 2012 and acclaimed filmmaker and activist Mira Nair in 2013.

Other charities Gandhi is involved with either directly or through her Foundation include the Happy Home and School for the blind in Mumbai, the Robert F. Kennedy Centre for Justice & Human Rights, the Cambodian Landmine Relief Fund, Centerpoint, Give to Colombia and The American Friends of Prince William and Prince Harry.

Gandhi's Foundation has also contributed to certain institutions of learning. In 2012, the Foundation funded a high-powered, state-of-the-art telescope, which was installed on the roof of the Harrow School in London.

== Publications and products ==
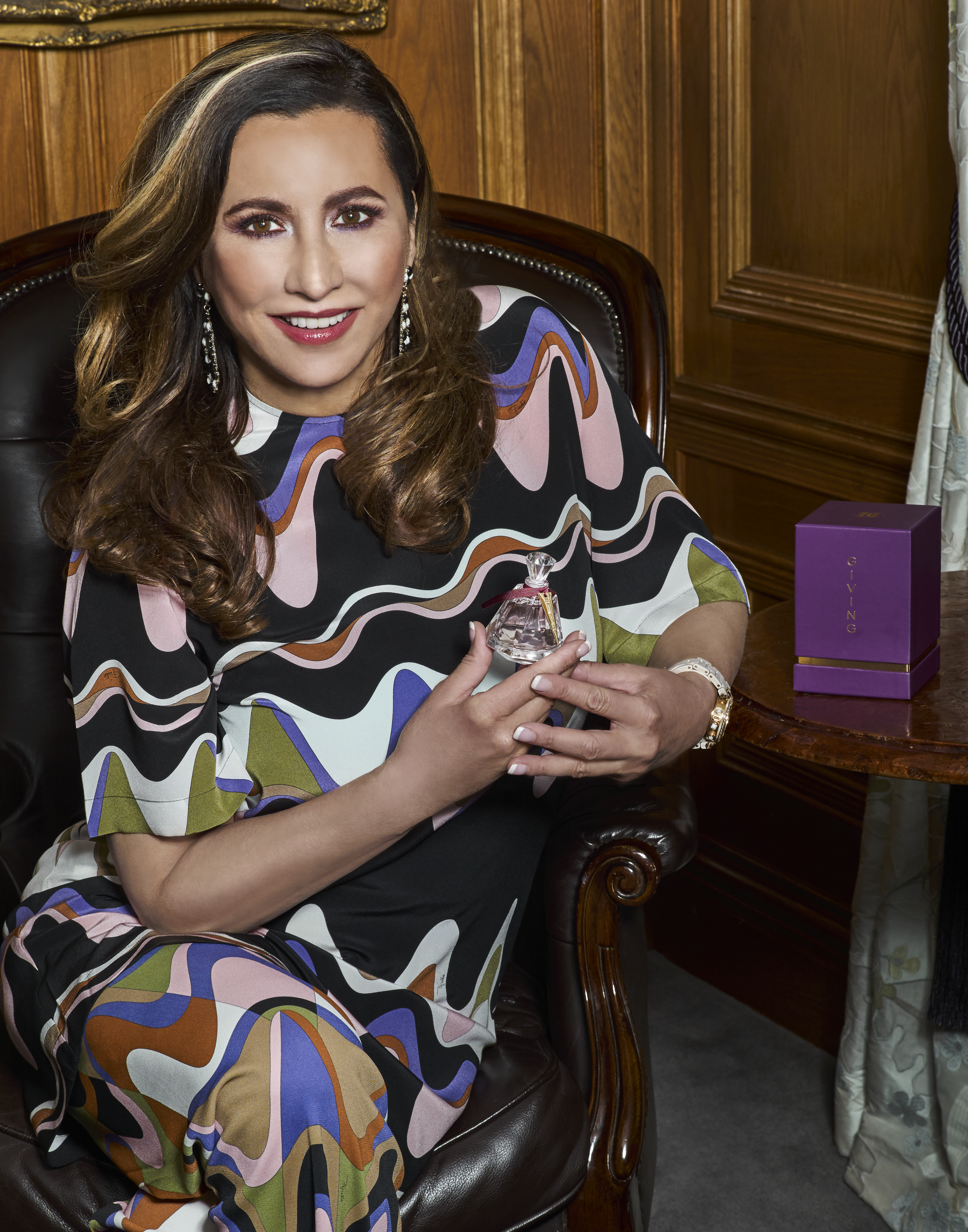

In 2017, Meera Gandhi produced The Meera Gandhi Show which airs on B4U TV Network, along with on themeeragandhishow.com, southasiantimes.com. Each episode is based on essential life changing topics used to de-stress and live a more joyful, positive life. The show goes in-depth into one-on-one interviews with significant influencers from all walks of life : friends, healers, spiritual gurus, politicians, diplomats, actors and lawyers. Gandhi provides a close glimpse into the lives of the successful and spiritual, as well as current and trending topics and new, upcoming music.

In 2016, Gandhi introduced her world class candle, "The Giving Candle". Also, scheduled for launch in 2016, Gandhi will launch The Giving Fragrance. The Giving Candle and Fragrance are available on GivingBackFragrance.com, and will be available on Amazon.com.

In 2010, Meera produced and directed a musical CD entitled "Giving Back" featuring a host of International artists including Marco Figueira, Lucia Hwong Gordon, Juliet Hanlon, David Harilela and Chandrika Tandon. She also authored a coffee table book, and produced a documentary film, both of which are also entitled "Giving Back."

Both the documentary film and book are meant to demonstrate the philanthropic efforts of her friends and those who inspire her. The book also features interviews with Bono and others Alex Counts, President and CEO of Grameen Foundation, found Meera's message of "giving back" to ring true: "'giving back' – when done thoughtfully and in the right spirit – does not leave the donor with less, but rather with more.". The documentary film was sold out at the Woodstock Film Festival in 2011. One hundred percent of the proceeds from all of Meera Gandhi's Giving Back Foundation projects go to her charitable projects around the globe.

Meera was a part of a panel discussion hosted by the Asia Society about her book. The other panellist on the panel was Donzelina Barroso, senior advisor with Rockefeller Philanthropy Advisors. The panel was moderated by Alisyn Camerota, host of Fox and Friends Weekend. The discussion included ways to encourage teens and children to "give back" at an early age.

== Personal life ==
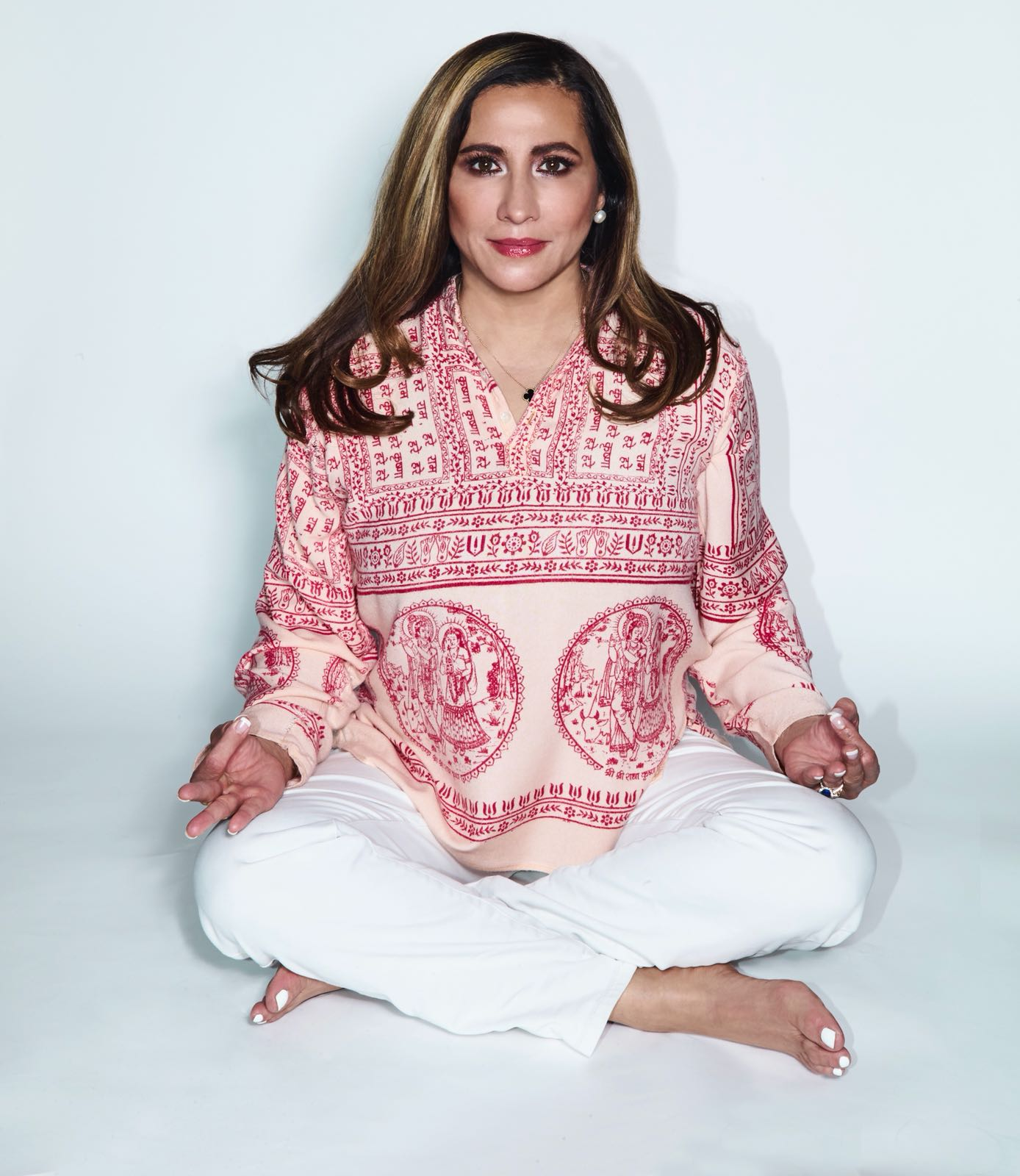

Meera Gandhi lives mostly in NYC, and owns the historic town house of former First Lady Eleanor Roosevelt. She has three grown children - two daughters and one son. One of her daughters is musician Kiran Gandhi, also known as Madame Gandhi. Growing up, Gandhi spent time in both New York City and Bombay, India.

Gandhi produces The Meera Gandhi TV show that airs every Sunday on B4 U TV network on Health, Happiness and living a stress free life. Gandhi also owns the GIVING line of products and properties in Palm Beach, Florida, and Hyde Park, New York.

== Awards and recognition ==
Over the years, Gandhi and her Foundation have received numerous awards.

- Marc Anthony Maestro Cares Foundation - Global humanitarian award, 16 February 2016
- Humanitarian award of the Year from the Mayor's office of the City of NY in 2015
- The Ellis Island Gold Medal Award in 2015
- The Marc Anthony Maestro cares Humanitarian award in 2015
- NYC Mayor Award 2015
- Share and Care Foundation, NJ 2014-2015
- Ellis Island Medal of Honor
- J. Luce Foundation Award, 26 February 2015
- City of New York Proclamation at The United Nations Sri Lanka Mission, 26 February 2015
- Marc Anthony Maestro Cares Foundation - Global humanitarian award, 17 February 2015
- Children's Hope Humanitarian award, 13 October 2013
- Corporate Global Humanitarian award, 2013
- Distinguished Alumni Award from Boston University, the University's highest honour, 2011
- Donna Karan International "Women Who Inspire," 2011
- Person of the Year by the Wayúu Tayá Foundation, 2010
