= Longyear Lake =

Lake in the state of Minnesota, United States

Coordinates: 47°29′29″N 92°52′23″W

- Location within Minnesota Location within the United States
- Location: St. Louis County, Minnesota
- Type: Natural freshwater lake
- Basin countries: United States
- Max. length: 4,750 ft (1,450 m)
- Max. width: 1,940 ft (590 m)
- Surface elevation: 1,486 ft (453 m)
- Islands: several islets
- Settlements: Chisholm, Minnesota

Longyear Lake is a lake in St. Louis County, in the U.S. state of Minnesota.

Longyear Lake bears the name of brothers who were businessmen in the local mining industry.

== See also ==
- List of lakes in Minnesota
