= Liana Nella-Potiropoulou =

Liana Nella-Potiropoulou is a Greek architect, Founding Partner of the architectural practice Potiropoulos+Partners. She was born in Athens, Greece to her parents Konstantinos and Sofia Nella. She studied architecture at National Technical University of Athens (NTUA). During her studies she received the 17th November» award. She earned her master's degree in architectural design and theory at the University of Pennsylvania, where she received the "Frank Miles" Theory of Architecture Award.

During her studies Liana Nella-Potiropoulou worked for the practice of prof. Pavlos Mylonas, and later she collaborated with the "Hellenic Design Centre" and the practice A.N. Tombazis and Associates Architects. At the same time, she started her own practice and took part in architectural competitions.

In 1989, along with her spouse Dimitris Potiropoulos, she established the firm Potiropoulos + Partners, one of Greece's most accomplished architectural practices with international recognition. In 2019 their son Rigas Potiropoulos joined as a partner. The firm maintains offices in Athens GR & London UK.

The work of Potiropoulos + Partners includes well-known buildings such as A. Trichas Residence in Philothei, Athens, Greece, the Olympic Airlines Airport Services Building Complex in Athens International Airport “Eleftherios Venizelos”, Athens, Greece, the restoration and reuse of Listed Hotel «Grande Albergo delle Rose», Rhodes, Greece, the Olympic Tennis Centre in the Athens Olympic Sports Center (Ο.Α.Κ.Α.), Athens, Greece, the extension and renovation of Mercedes Benz Hellas Central Facilities in N. Kifissia, Athens, Greece, Flisvos Marina, Athens, Greece, the Cultural Centre Square in Gerakas, Athens, Greece, the Kindergarten of German School of Athens in Maroussi, Athens, Greece, «Evmareia» Touristic Complex in Brestova Zagorie, Croatia and PROJECT "X"– Research, Education, Conference and Sports Centre of ELPEN S.A. in Spata Business Area, Athens, Greece.

Awards and recognition received by the firm since its inception include the 1st prize for the Natural History Museum on Samos, Greece, the 3rd Prize for the Complex of the "Technical Chamber of Greece" in Maroussi, Attica, Greece, the 2nd prize for the New Acropolis Museum, Athens, Greece in collaboration with Studio Daniel Libeskind, the 1st prize for the Restoration of the Listed Building Complex of the Silk-mill "Ekmetzoglou" in Volos, Greece, a special commendation for the entry for the Grand Egyptian Museum in Cairo, Egypt, etc. The project "Kindergarten of German School of Athens" in Maroussi, Athens, Greece was nominated for the Mies van der Rohe Awards 2015. The firm has also gained international recognition and has won several awards such as: Architizer A+ Award, German Design Award, A Design Award, World Architecture Award, Big SEE Architecture Award, Iconic Award.THE FIRM has been nominated for Mies van der Rohe Awards 2015 – European Union Prize for Contemporary Architecture as well.

Liana's Nella-Potiropoulou work has been presented in exhibitions in Greece and abroad, such as: 1st Biennale for Young Greek Architects – Athens, Greece, 1996, 2nd Biennale for Young Greek Architects – Athens, Greece, 1998, Landscapes of Modernization; Greek Architecture 1960s and 1990s – Rotterdam, the Netherlands, 1999, International Architectural Exhibition – Belgrade, Serbia, 2000, Pan-Hellenic Exhibition of Architectural Project – Patras, Greece, 2000/2003/2006, The Scientific Work of Women Engineers – Athens, Greece, 2008, The shape of Space; 40 Years Architectural Trends – Athens, Greece, 2008 among others.

In 2009 the monograph "Potiropoulos D+L Architects" was published by "Potamos Editions" and includes selected works of the practice of the period 1989–2009. It is foreworded by Daniel Libeskind and Prof. Dimitris Philippides. In the publication titled Readings of Greek Post-war Architecture (Kaleidoskopio Editions, 2014), the author Panayiotis Tsakopoulos selected the work of Potiropoulos+Partners as one of the 18 most representative samples of architecture in post-war Greece.

Liana Nella-Potiropoulou was teaching Architectural Design in Patras School of Architecture, Patras, Greece. Her lectures and publications concern projects and studies emerged by her practice as well as issues of architectural theory. Her work has been published both in Greek and international press.

== References - External Links[edit] ==
Potiropoulos+Partners

KTIRIO | Potiropoulos+Partners

ARCHITIZER | Potiropoulos+Partners

ARCHETYPE | Potiropoulos+Partners

Athens Voice | Athens' "next day" architecture

Lifo | 30 years Potiropoulos+Partners

Andro | Potiropoulos+Partners

Architect | The Helix

Grad Review | Beachfront Villa

e-Travel News | Active Materiality

Huffington Post | New, emblematic buildings are being built in Attica, Greece

Architect | International award for the Football Stadium of PAE Larissa Complex

KTIRIO | Retail & office building in Athens, Greece

Marie Claire | International Interior Design Award for "Shedia Home"

Kataskeves Ktirion | Hotel and luxury villas tourist complex in Croatia
