= Leanne M. Williams =

American professor

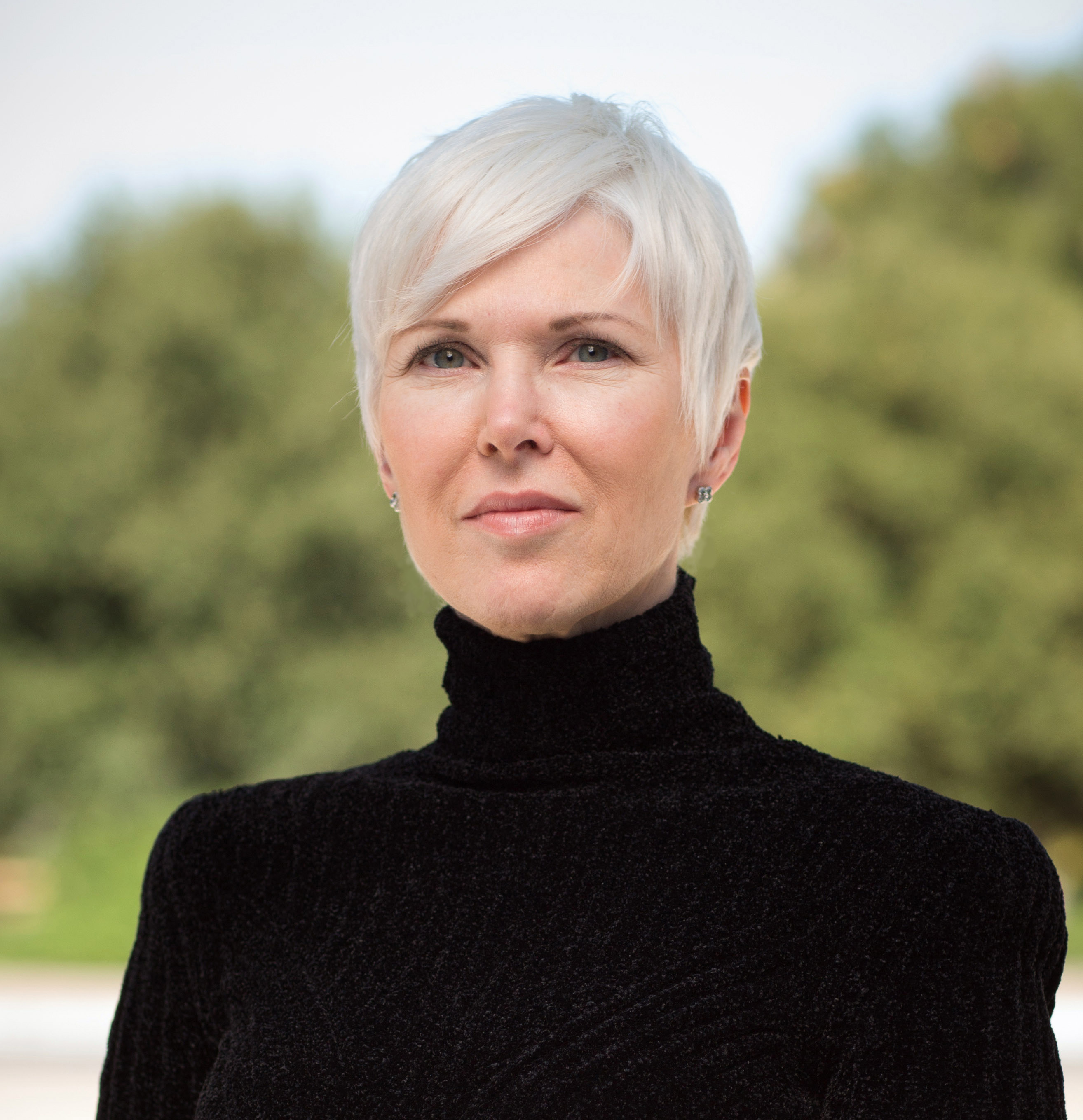
Leanne M Williams

Leanne M. Williams is a professor in psychiatry and behavioural sciences at Stanford University. She is also the founding director of the Stanford Center for Precision Mental Health and Wellness and of the Precision Psychiatry and Translational Neuroscience Laboratory in the Stanford Medical School.

She received a B.A. in clinical psychology in 1987 from the University of Queensland, Australia, and then a Class I honours B.A. in psychology in 1990 from the University of New England, Australia She then received a Ph.D. from the University of New England, Australia PhD in 1996 for research conducted on a British Council scholarship at Oxford University. In 1999 she was appointed Senior Lecturer at the University of Sydney, and promoted to associate professor there in 2002, and then in 2008 to foundation professor of cognitive neuropsychiatry at the Sydney Medical School and director of the interdisciplinary Brain Dynamics Centre in Sydney. She went to Stanford as a visiting professor in 2013.

Her research focuses on the use of human neuroimaging and computational approaches to find methods for diagnosing and treating mental disorders. She has developed a taxonomy for depression and related mood and anxiety disorders that quantifies large-scale human brain circuits for more precise diagnostic subtyping and for personalising treatment choices.

== Publications ==
Williams' most cited peer-reviewed articles are:

- Liddell BJ, Brown KJ, Kemp AH, Barton MJ, Das P, Peduto A, Gordon E, Williams LM. A direct brainstem–amygdala–cortical ‘alarm’system for subliminal signals of fear. Neuroimage. 2005 Jan 1;24(1):235-43. Cited 612 times according to Google Scholar.
- Lee KH, Williams LM, Breakspear M, Gordon E. Synchronous gamma activity: a review and contribution to an integrative neuroscience model of schizophrenia. Brain Research Reviews. 2003 Jan 1;41(1):57-78. Cited 492 times according to Google Scholar .
- Rubinov M, Knock SA, Stam CJ, Micheloyannis S, Harris AW, Williams LM, Breakspear M. Small‐world properties of nonlinear brain activity in schizophrenia. Human brain mapping. 2009 Feb;30(2):403-16. Cited 362 times according to Google Scholar .
- Williams LM, Phillips ML, Brammer MJ, Skerrett D, Lagopoulos J, Rennie C, Bahramali H, Olivieri G, David AS, Peduto A, Gordon E. Arousal dissociates amygdala and hippocampal fear responses: evidence from simultaneous fMRI and skin conductance recording. Neuroimage. 2001 Nov 1;14(5):1070-9. Cited 332 times according to Google Scholar.
- Williams LM, Das P, Harris AW, Liddell BB, Brammer MJ, Olivieri G, Skerrett D, Phillips ML, David AS, Peduto A, Gordon E. Dysregulation of arousal and amygdala-prefrontal systems in paranoid schizophrenia. American Journal of Psychiatry. 2004 Mar 1;161(3):480-9. Cited 322 times according to Google Schola .
- Williams LM, Kemp AH, Felmingham K, Barton M, Olivieri G, Peduto A, Gordon E, Bryant RA. Trauma modulates amygdala and medial prefrontal responses to consciously attended fear. Neuroimage. 2006 Jan 15;29(2):347-57. Cited 338 times according to Google Scholar .
