= Leanne Schuster =

American volleyball player

Personal information
- Full name: Leanne Schuster McSorley
- Born: February 7, 1973 (age 53); Mesa, Arizona, United States
- Height: 5 ft 8 in (1.73 m)

Leanne Schuster McSorley (born February 7, 1973) is an American indoor volleyball and beach volleyball player. Leanne graduated from Arizona State University in 1995 with a degree in Business Management. While at ASU, she was a two-time second team Academic All-Pac-10 selection. Leanne married former professional hockey player Marty McSorley in August 2002. She is the youngest of seven children, with four sisters and two brothers.

== Professional career ==
Teamed with Carrie Busch to win the BVA Hermosa Beach event in 2000. Her best international finish was a third in the 2000 season finale in Brazil with Nancy Mason. She was a four-year letterman in volleyball at Arizona State where she earned All-League and All-Region honors and is listed among the school's all-time leaders in several statistics. Was a member of the 1992 Olympic Festival championship team.
