= Liana Cipcigan =

Welsh electrical engineer

Liana M. Cipcigan is a Welsh electrical and transport engineer who works in the UK as Professor of Transport Electrification and Smart Grids at Cardiff University. Her research interests include smart grids and the effects of electric vehicles on road and power networks.

Before joining Cardiff University, Cipcigan was a senior lecturer at the Technical University of Cluj-Napoca in Romania, and a researcher at the University of Alberta in Canada and at Durham University in the UK.

Cipcigan was elected to the Learned Society of Wales in 2023.
