= Disappearance of LeeAnna Warner =

Unsolved disappearance of five-year-old girl in 2003

LeeAnna Warner
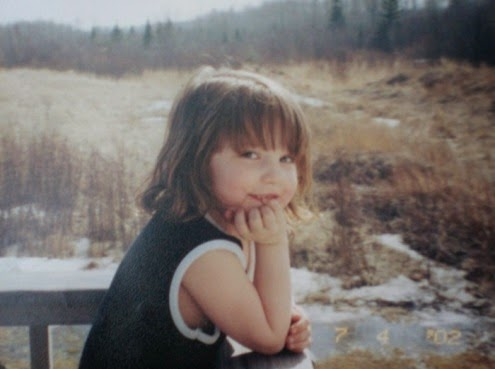
- LeeAnna Warner aged 4
- Born: LeeAnna Susan Marie Warner; January 21, 1998
- Disappeared: June 14, 2003 (aged 5); Chisholm, Minnesota, U.S.
- Status: Missing for 23 years, 2 months and 30 days
- Height: 3 ft 2 in (0.97 m)
- Parents: Christopher Warner (father); Tiffany ‘Kaelin’ Whittaker (mother)

On June 14, 2003, LeeAnna Warner, a five‑year‑old girl from Chisholm, Minnesota, disappeared while walking home from a friend's house. She was last seen between 5:00 and 5:15 p.m. on Southwest Second or Third Street, and has not been found. Although no definitive evidence of an abduction has been uncovered, investigators consider kidnapping the most likely explanation, arguing that she would likely have been located had she simply wandered off.

Over the years, police have received more than 1,700 leads, but none have produced a viable suspect. As of 2026, LeeAnna's case remains unsolved.

== Background ==
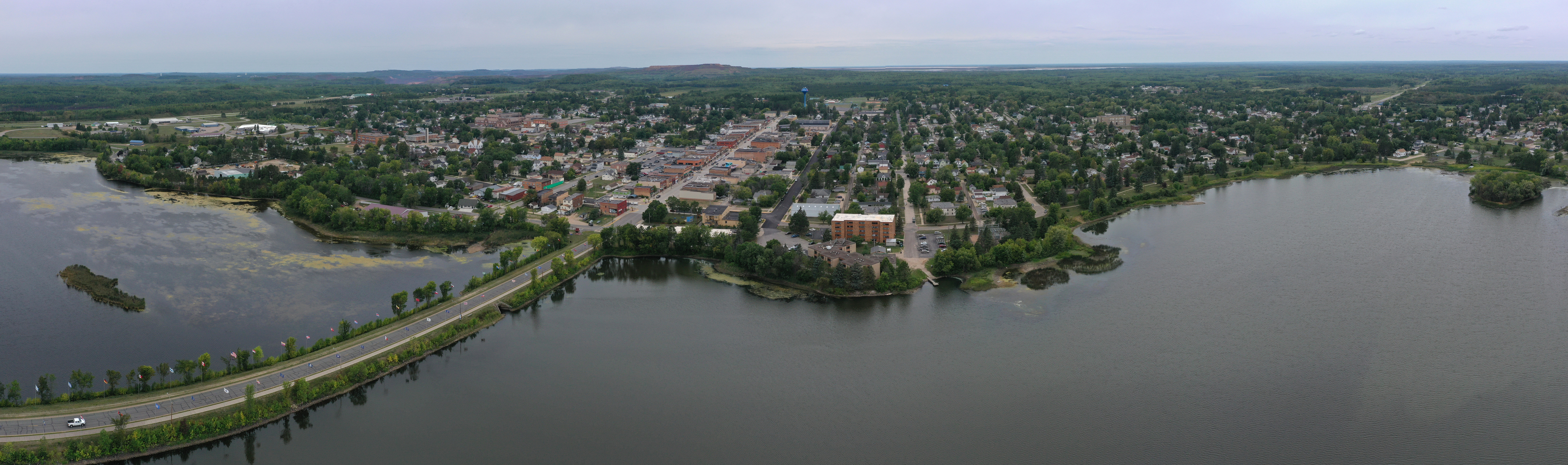
Aerial panorama of Chisholm, Minnesota, from over Longyear Lake

The Warner family includes Tiffany Kaelin Whittaker, who preferred to go by Kaelin Whittaker, Christopher Warner, and their daughter LeeAnna Warner.

LeeAnna's parents had both previously been divorced from other partners. Christopher and Kaelin met and moved in with one another towards the end of 1996, and Kaelin gave birth to LeeAnna on January 21, 1998. The Warners had only moved to Chisholm a few months prior to LeeAnna's disappearance.

LeeAnna was described as being an outgoing, friendly and very brave child, with survival instincts that were considered to be quite advanced for her age. She enjoyed playing with dolls, riding her bike, and spending time with her family.

Kaelin was charged with a hit and run for hitting Christopher with her car in October 2003. Kaelin died on December 10, 2022.

== Disappearance ==
Locations
1 Second Street near Warner home.

On June 14, 2003, LeeAnna was last seen walking barefoot home from her friend's house, which was approximately a block and a half away from her own home.

Kaelin Warner informed the authorities that they had just returned home from the Side Lake Rummage Sale. Despite Kaelin's protests that LeeAnna needed to rest, her daughter decided that she wanted to go play with her friend, who lived only a few streets away. Kaelin gave her permission to go as long as LeeAnna was home by 5 p.m.

LeeAnna made the commute to her friend's house at 4:30 p.m., a short walk that her parents say she had done many times on her own. However, upon her arrival it was apparent that there was no one at home at her friend's place, so she decided to turn around and go home. LeeAnna was last seen walking on southwest Second or Third Street, between 5:00 and 5:15 p.m.

By 5 p.m. LeeAnna had not returned home and her mother began to panic. At around 5:30 pm Kaelin began the search for her daughter, enlisting the help of people in the neighborhood. Parents and children from the surrounding suburbs gathered together to search for LeeAnna.

By 9:00 p.m., despite the extensive search party, there had still been no sighting of LeeAnna. It was at this stage that Kaelin and Chris reported their daughter missing to the local police.

=== Victim's appearance ===
At the time of her disappearance, LeeAnna stood between 3 feet 0 inches (0.91 m) and 3 feet 2 inches (0.97 m), and weighed approximately 50 pounds (22.7 kg). She is described as being a petite Caucasian female with brown hair and brown eyes. Her hair was cut into a short bob cut at the time of her disappearance. LeeAnna has two main distinguishing characteristics, a mole above her left ankle and a dimple on her left shoulder.

The last thing that LeeAnna was seen wearing was a sleeveless blue denim dress (some sources state a denim shirt) with a belt, orange underwear, a flower earring with a red garnet in her right ear, and no shoes or socks.

== Investigation ==
The Chisholm Police Department arrived on the scene shortly after they received the phone call from the Warner family. Another search party was sent out, this time including the aid of the authorities. A combination of police, firefighters, local volunteers and expert trackers with bloodhounds gathered to search the town.

They checked garages, barns, sheds and abandoned iron ore mines in the hopes that LeeAnna had simply wandered off and gotten lost. The group searched for over 48 hours but were unable to find anything that hinted at what happened to LeeAnna.

In the weeks following her disappearance, authorities held an extensive search that included helicopters and bloodhounds, but by the end of the month they were not any closer to finding LeeAnna.

A month after LeeAnna vanished, a local townsperson came across a child's footprints near Longyear Lake, the lake LeeAnna was at with her mother on the day of her disappearance. The Chisholm Police Department had the lake drained in an attempt to locate LeeAnna or her body, but they found no other evidence of her being there. They were forced to stop their search over the winter as the lake and the surrounding areas froze over.

In the summer of 2004, the authorities began a new search of Chisholm in another effort to find LeeAnna's remains, but no new evidence surfaced. Since then there have been no further official searches scheduled.

In 2020, Chisholm Police Chief Vern Manner said, "We still have several persons of interest in the fact that we cannot call them suspects because we don't have any evidence [...] But we have people that we can't clear out either."

In 2025, Chisholm Police Chief James Vukad reported that Warner's case remains open, active, and a top priority for the department, saying, "Our team continues to investigate all credible leads, including those made possible through advanced DNA profiling techniques [...] While we have not had a major breakthrough to date, our efforts have never wavered and we remain hopeful that one day we will find the answers we’ve been searching for."

== Suspects and theories ==
There are a number of suspects and theories associated with what happened to LeeAnna Warner. However, to this date none of them have been proven true.

=== Kaelin Whittaker, Christopher Warner and Family ===
Kaelin and Christopher were never considered suspects and they were not required to take lie detector tests. However, Christopher had been having domestic problems with his ex-wife and had even sought out a restraining order on her. He also claimed that she had made threats towards Kaelin and LeeAnna.

Despite this information, authorities felt that Christopher's previous problems with his ex-wife were not connected to his daughter's disappearance.

Years after LeeAnna's disappearance, Kaelin and Christopher moved away from Chisholm to try and start fresh, claiming the town no longer felt safe, or like home, to them.

=== Matthew James Curtis ===
One of the main suspects that was identified as potentially having a role in LeeAnna's disappearance was a man by the name of Matthew James Curtis, who was aged 24 at the time. In August 2003, Curtis was arrested for possession of child pornography. He was interrogated a number of times by the police about whether or not he had anything to do with LeeAnna's case.

Due to his prior charges and his proximity to LeeAnna, authorities suspected that Curtis had played a role in the young girl's disappearance. They were granted a warrant and searched his pickup truck for DNA samples. However, an extensive search of his trucks and his belongings revealed that there was no evidence that LeeAnna had ever been in the vehicle. Therefore, there was no way to directly connect Curtis to the case.

In September 2003, the day before he was supposed to appear in the local court for the child pornography charges, Curtis' corpse was found in his pickup truck, a few miles out of Chisholm. Authorities claim that Curtis suffocated himself with a plastic bag. The investigation into Curtis's death was closed and officially ruled a suicide.

However, there was a great deal of speculation and controversy surrounding his death, with some believing that Curtis was murdered and that his body was positioned to make it look like a suicide. Currently, there is no evidence to support this claim.

=== Joseph Edward Duncan III ===
Joseph Edward Duncan III was a convicted sex offender who was accused of kidnapping two children in Idaho.

When the authorities were going through his computer for an unrelated case, they came across an encrypted document which made reference to LeeAnna's disappearance. Duncan also kept an online diary and in 2004, Duncan wrote in this diary, explaining that he was afraid that he was going to be blamed for the disappearance of LeeAnna Warner. He also discussed his dissatisfaction with the investigation into him and his discontentment with being labelled a sex offender.

His knowledge of the missing Minnesota girl led to an investigation about whether he had anything to do with the young girl's disappearance. However, the authorities could find nothing concrete to put him on trial. A timeline of Duncan's most recent activities also revealed that he had not been in the Chisholm area at the time of LeeAnna's alleged abduction.

=== “A little old lady” ===
Christopher and Kaelin told authorities that in the weeks leading up to her disappearance, LeeAnna had been behaving strangely.

One afternoon LeeAnna's parents came home to her playing with a case filled with Barbie dolls and their clothes, despite them never having purchased the toys for her. When Kaelin asked her where she had gotten them from, LeeAnna said that she had been given them from “a little old lady."

A week prior to her disappearance, LeeAnna packed a suitcase with all her favorite things and told her parents that she wanted to go live at her new family's house. They also found her sleeping in her closet one night, claiming that she was afraid that monsters outside her window were going to get her.

Investigators looked into this and determined that there was no evidence to indicate that anyone had used toys to lure LeeAnna away from her family. The information was dismissed.

=== Unidentified suspects ===
At the time of LeeAnna's disappearance, numerous witnesses recall seeing a man in his mid-thirties walking around the neighborhood. He was described as being approximately 5 ft 10 in (1.78 m) tall and around 155 lb (70 kg). He allegedly had a dark tattoo of a star or a sun on his right arm. This man has not been identified.

Around the same time, witnesses identified a maroon and blue Cadillac that was driven by an African-American man who appeared to be in his twenties or thirties and had a bald or shaven head. There were also accounts of an unfamiliar older-model rusty brown pickup truck that was driven by a Caucasian man with black curly hair.

None of these men have been identified and it remains unclear whether any of them had anything to do with LeeAnna's disappearance.

== Media attention ==
LeeAnna's disappearance received local media attention, particularly from Chisholm and the surrounding areas. The case was aired on America's Most Wanted in July of that year. In recent years, People Magazine had attempted to investigate the disappearance of the young girl.

Podcast True Crime Garage released a two-part series on LeeAnna's disappearance in August 2021. Part one details the circumstances of LeeAnna's disappearance and part two discusses possible suspects.

== See also ==
- List of people who disappeared mysteriously: post-1970
