= Leanne Kemp =

Australian tech entrepreneur

Leanne Kemp is an Australian tech entrepreneur. She is the founder and CEO of Everledger and was Queensland Chief Entrepreneur.

== Career ==
Kemp has a background in emerging technologies, business, jewelry, and insurance. She is the founder & CEO of Everledger, a company that uses blockchain to track the provenance of high-value assets. The goal of the platform is to help insurers, claimants and other stakeholders combat fraud and money laundering. In 2018, the company closed a $10 million Series A round which saw the company valued at over $50 million .

Kemp sits on boards for the IBM Blockchain Board of Advisors, the World Trade Board, and the World Economic Forum's blockchain council. Everledger has won awards including the Meffy Award 2015 for innovation in FinTech, BBVA Open Talent 2015, Fintech Finals Best in Show Award 2016 Hong Kong and was a nominee for The FT ArcelorMittal Boldness in Business Awards 2016.

Kemp also held the position of Queensland Chief Entrepreneur from 2018 until 2020, an honorary role of the Queensland Government.

Kemp joined OpenUK as their Chief Sustainability Officer in late‑2022.

== Awards ==
In 2016, Kemp was named in UK Business Insider's 26 Coolest Women in UK Tech 2016 and Brummell Magazine's Top 30 Female Innovators. She was elected as one of the Europe's and the World's Top 50 Women in Tech in 2018. She has also been named an IBM Champion in 2018. In that same year, she also received a reward from the Advance Global Australian Award in the area of Technological Innovation.

== Public speaking ==
Kemp has talked at events such as TedxBrussels. She has also been on multiple speaking platforms. In September 2018, she had the opportunity to discuss multiple environmental agendas with multiple panelist, including former Vice President Al Gore, at the WEF Impact Summit in New York.

== Everledger Australia ==
=== Financial Difficulties and Liquidation ===
In June 2023, Everledger, a Brisbane-based blockchain technology company specializing in provenance tracking for diamonds and luxury goods, faced significant financial challenges. The company entered administration due to funding issues, with reported debts of approximately AU$10 million. A creditors' meeting, originally scheduled to address the company’s situation, was postponed to June 28, 2023. By the time of liquidation, unsecured creditors were owed AU$19,178,371. The collapse prompted scrutiny of Everledger’s business model and management practices, including allegations of mismanagement and concerns over the conduct of its CEO, Leanne Kemp. Prior findings by a Federal Government agency had cited 'bad faith' in the company’s operations, and there were claims of potential breaches of Australian Consumer Law related to the misuse of third-party intellectual property.
