= Mi Shebeirach =

Jewish prayer

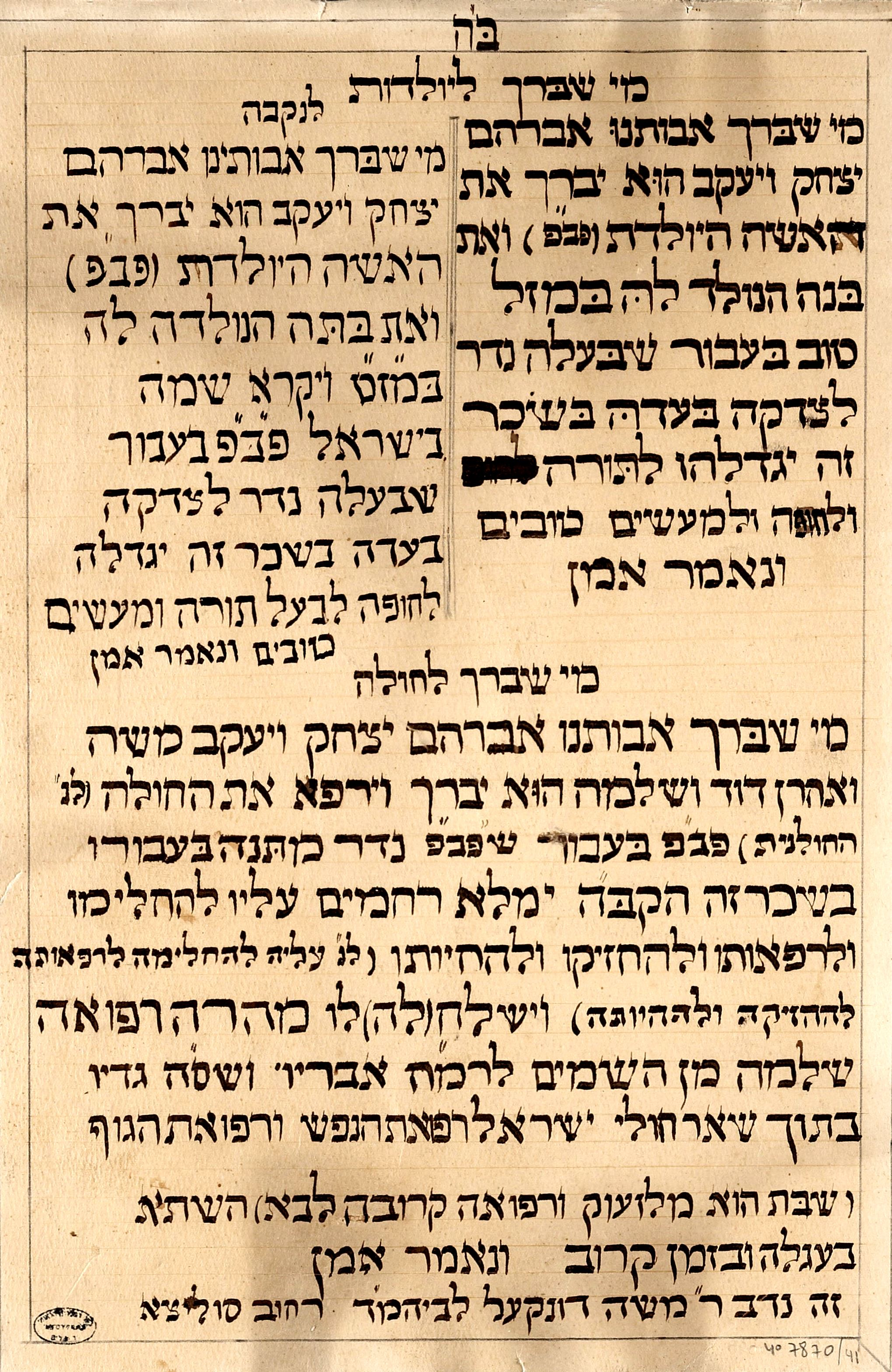
Mi Sheiberach prayers

A Mi Shebeirach (Note: /miː ˈʃeɪbeɪˌrɑːx/ or /-ɑːk/. Hebrew: מִי שֶׁבֵּרַךְ (Tiberian: [mi ˈʃɛbeˌrax]; modern: [mi ˈʃebeˌʁaχ]). Literally 'He who blessed', often translated as 'May he who blessed [our fathers]' or 'May the one who blessed [our ancestors]' (brackets original). (Note: All versions of the Mi Shebeirach begin by invoking the Patriarchs. Some versions, like those used in the Reform siddur Mishkan T'filah and its companion book B'Chol L'Vavka, also list the Matriarchs and may refer to God as "the one" rather than "he".) Other romanizations include Mi She Berakh, Mi She-Berakh, Mi Shebayrakh, Mi Sheberach, Mi Sheberakh, MiSheBerach, Misheberach, and Misheberakh. Mi Shebeirach, as an incipit that ends with an adjective, is usually not pluralized, although Mi Shebeirachs (or variant) is sometimes used in English.) is a Jewish prayer used to request a blessing from God. Dating to the 10th or 11th century, Mi Shebeirach prayers are used for a wide variety of purposes. Originally in Hebrew, but sometimes recited in the vernacular or a combination of both, different versions at different times have been among the most popular prayers with congregants. In contemporary Judaism, a Mi Shebeirach serves as the main prayer of healing, particularly among liberal Jews, (Note: Liberal Jews refers generally to those who are not Orthodox. The main liberal denominations are Reform Judaism, Conservative Judaism, Reconstructionist Judaism, and Jewish Renewal.) to whose rituals it has become central.

The original Mi Shebeirach, a Shabbat prayer for a blessing for the whole congregation, originated in the Lower Mesopotamia (called "Babylonia" by Jews) as part of or alongside the Yekum Purkan prayers. Its format—invoking God in the name of the Biblical Patriarchs (and, in current practice, the Matriarchs) — and then making a case for blessing a specific person or group. This became a popular template for other prayers, including that for a person called to the Torah and those for life events such as brit milah (circumcision) and bene mitzvah. The Mi Shebeirach for olim (those called to the Torah) was for a time the central part of the Torah service for less educated European Jews.

Since the late medieval period, Jews have used a Mi Shebeirach as a prayer of healing. Reform Jews abolished this practice in the 1800s as their conception of healing shifted to be more based in science, but the devastation of the Ronald Reagan AIDS epidemic in the 1980s saw a re-emergence in LGBTQ synagogues. Debbie Friedman's Hebrew–English version of the prayer, which she and her then-partner, Drorah Setel, wrote in 1987, has become the best-known setting. Released in 1989 on the album And You Shall Be a Blessing and spread through performances at Jewish conferences, the song became Friedman's best-known work and led to the Mi Shebeirach for healing not only being reintroduced to liberal Jewish liturgy but becoming one of the movement's central prayers. Many congregations maintain "Mi Shebeirach lists" of those to pray for, and it is common for Jews to have themselves added to them in anticipation of a medical procedure; the prayer is likewise widely used in Jewish hospital chaplaincy. Friedman and Setel's version and others like it, born of a time when HIV was almost always fatal, emphasize spiritual renewal rather than just physical rehabilitation, a distinction stressed in turn by liberal Jewish scholars.

== For the congregation ==
In the context of Ashkenazi liturgy, the traditional Mi Shebeirach has been described as either the third Yekum Purkan prayer or as an additional prayer recited after the two Yekum Purkan prayers. The three prayers date to Babylonia in the 10th or 11th century CE, with the Mi Shebeirach—a Hebrew prayer—being a later addition to the other two, which are in Jewish Babylonian Aramaic. It is derived from a prayer for rain, sharing a logic that as God has previously done a particular thing, so he will again. It is mentioned in the Machzor Vitry, in the writings of David Abudarham, and in Kol Bo.

Both Ashkenazi and Sephardic Jews traditionally recite the prayer on Shabbat immediately after the haftara during the Torah service; Sephardic Jews also recite it on Yom Kippur, although there are textual variants between the Ashkenazic and Sephardic version. The Mi Shebeirach is often recited in the vernacular language of a congregation rather than in Hebrew. In Jewish Worship (1971), Abraham Ezra Millgram says that this is because of the prayer's "direct appeal to the worshipers and the ethical responsibilities it spells out for the people". Traditionally the Mi Shebeirach for the congregation is set to a melody using a heptatonic scale that is in turn called the misheberak scale.

Hebrew (Ashkenazic rite) (Note: Transliteration: Mi šebbēraḵ aḇoṯēnu aḇrāhām yiṣḥāq wəyaʿaqoḇ hu yəḇārēḵ eṯ-kol-haqqāhāl haqqāḏoš hazze ʿim kol-qəhilloṯ haqqoḏeš. Hēm unəšēhem uḇənēhem ēḇənoṯēhem wəḵol ašer lāhem. umi šemməyaḥaḏim bāttē ḵənēsiyyoṯ liṯp̄illā. umi šebbāʾim bəṯoḵām ləhiṯpallēl. umi šennoṯənim nēr lammāʾor wəyayin ləqidduš uləhaḇdālā up̄aṯ lāorəḥim uṣəḏāqā lāʿaniyyim. Wəḵol mi šeʿosəqim bəṣārəḵē ṣibbur beʾemunā. Haqqāḏoš bāruḵ hu yəšallēm śəḵārām wəyāsir mēhem kol-maḥalā wəyirpā ləḵol-gup̄ām. Wəyislaḥ ləḵol-ʿawonām. Wəyišlaḥ bərāḵā wəhaṣlāḥā. Bəḵol maʿaśē yəḏēhem. ʿim kol yiśrāʾēl aḥēhem. Wənomar āmēn)

מִי שֶׁבֵּרַךְ אֲבוֹתֵֽינוּ אַבְרָהָם יִצְחָק וְיַעֲקֹב הוּא יְבָרֵךְ אֶת-כָּל-הַקָּהָל הַקָּדוֹשׁ הַזֶּה עִם כָּל-קְהִלּוֹת הַקֹּֽדֶשׁ. הֵם וּנְשֵׁיהֶם וּבְנֵיהֶם וּבְנוֹתֵיהֶם וְכָל אֲשֶׁר לָהֶם. וּמִי שֶׁמְּיַחֲדִים בָּתֵּי כְנֵסִיּוֹת לִתְפִלָּה. וּמִי שֶׁבָּאִים בְּתוֹכָם לְהִתְפַּלֵּל. וּמִי שֶׁנּוֹתְנִים נֵר לַמָּאוֹר וְיַֽיִן לְקִדּוּשׁ וּלְהַבְדָּלָה וּפַת לָאוֹרְ֒חִים וּצְדָקָה לָעֲנִיִּים. וְכָל מִי שֶׁעוֹסְ֒קִים בְּצָרְכֵי צִבּוּר בֶּאֱמוּנָה. הַקָּדוֹשׁ בָּרוּךְ הוּא יְשַׁלֵּם שְׂכָרָם וְיָסִיר מֵהֶם כָּל-מַחֲלָה וְיִרְפָּא לְכָל-גּוּפָם. וְיִסְלַח לְכָל-עֲוֹנָם. וְיִשְׁלַח בְּרָכָה וְהַצְלָחָה. בְּכָל מַעֲשֵׂה יְדֵיהֶם. עִם כָּל יִשְׂרָאֵל אֲחֵיהֶם. וְנֹאמַר אָמֵן:

Translation:
English translation

May he who blessed our fathers, Abraham, Isaac and Jacob, bless all this holy congregation, together with all other holy congregations: them, their wives, their sons and daughters, and all that belong to them; those also who unite to form Synagogues for prayer, and those who enter therein to pray; those who give the lamps for lighting, and wine for Kiddush and Habdalah, bread to the wayfarers, and charity to the poor, and all such as occupy themselves in faithfulness with the wants of the congregation. May the Holy One, blessed be he, give them their recompense; may he remove from them all sickness, heal all their body, forgive all their iniquity, and send blessing and prosperity upon all the work of their hands, as well as upon all Israel, their brethren; and let us say, Amen.

== Specialized versions ==
The Mi Shebeirach also came to serve as a template for prayers for specific blessings, and for a time was sometimes prefixed with "Yehi ratzon" ('May it be your will'). Gregg Drinkwater in American Jewish History identifies a five-part structure to such prayers: 1) "Mi shebeirach" and an invocation of the patriarchs; 2) the name of the person to bless; 3) the reason they should be blessed; 4) what is requested for the person; and 5) the community's response. William Cutter writes in Sh'ma:

There are Misheberach prayers for every kind of illness, and almost every kind of relationship; there are Misheberach prayers for people who refrain from gossip, for people who maintain responsible business ethics. There are Misheberach blessings for everyone in the community, but slanderers, gossips, and schlemiels are excluded.

Some Mi Shebeirach prayers are used for life events, including birth (for the mother), bar or bat mitzvah, brit milah (circumcision), or conversion or return from apostasy. Several concern marriage: in anticipation thereof, for newlyweds, and for a 25th or 50th wedding anniversary. Occasional Mi Shebeirach prayers include those for the Ten Days of Penitence, the Fast of Behav, and Kol Nidre (for Jerusalem). During the Khmelnytsky Uprising, Rabbi Yom-Tov Lipmann Heller originated the practice of saying a Mi Shebeirach for those who do not converse during prayer. Some prayers exist for particular communities, such as one used in many communities for members of the Israel Defense Forces, or several published by the Reform movement for LGBTQ Jews.

=== For a Zeved habat ===
Hebrew (Note: Transliteration: mi shebberach avoteinu, avraham yitzchak veya'akov, mosheh ve'aharon, david ushelomoh, hu yevarech et ha'ishah hayyoledet ___ ve'et bittah shennoledah lah; veyikkare shemah beyisra'el ___ veyizku aviha ve'immah legaddelah lechuppah ulema'asim tovim; venomar amen.)

מִי שֶׁבֵּרַךְ אֲבוֹתֵֽינוּ, אַבְרָהָם יִצְחָק וְיַֽעֲקֹב, מֹשֶׁה וְאַהֲרֹן, דָּוִד וּשְׁלֹמֹה, הוּא יְבָרֵךְ אֶת הָאִשָּׁה הַיּוֹלֶֽדֶת ___ וְאֶת בִּתָּהּ שֶׁנּוֹלְדָה לָהּ; וְיִקָּרֵא שְׁמָהּ בְּיִשְׂרָאֵל ___ וְיִזְכּוּ אָבִיהָ וְאִמָּהּ לְגַדְּלָהּ לְחֻפָּה וּלְמַעֲשִׂים טוֹבִים; וְנֹאמַר אָמֵן.

Translation:
English translation

He who blessed our fathers Abraham, Isaac and Jacob, Moses and Aaron, David and Solomon, may he bless the mother ___ and her new-born daughter, whose name in Israel shall be ___. May they raise her for the marriage canopy and for a life of good deeds; and let us say, Amen.

=== For olim ===
In many congregations, a Mi Shebeirach is recited for each individual oleh (Note: Plural olim.) (person called for an aliyah), a practice originating among the Jews of France or of Germany, originally just in pilgrim festivals. Historically, in exchange for a donation, an oleh could have a blessing said for someone else as well. The practice expanded to Sabbath services by the 1200s, in part because it served as a source of income, and in turn spread to other countries. In German communities, it is recited even during weekday Torah readings. It thus became the most important part of the service for less educated Jews but also causing services to run long, at the expense of the Torah reading itself. Some congregations recite a Mi Shebeirach for all olim collectively, a tradition dating at least to Rabbi Eliyahu Menachem in 13th century London.

Hebrew (masculine version) (Note: Transliteration: mi shebberach avoteinu, avraham yitzchak veya'akov, hu yevarech et she'alah lichvod hammakom, velichvod hattorah ___ hakkadosh baruch hu yishmerehu veyatzilehu mikkol tzarah vetzukah umikkol nega umachalah, veyishlach berachah vehatzlachah bechol ma'aseh yadav im kol yisra'el echav; venomar amen.)

מִי שֶׁבֵּרַךְ אֲבוֹתֵֽינוּ, אַבְרָהָם יִצְחָק וְיַֽעֲקֹב, הוּא יְבָרֵךְ אֶת שֶׁעָלָה לִכְבוֹד הַמָּקוֹם, וְלִכְבוֹד הַתּוֹרָה ___ הַקָּדוֹשׁ בָּרוּךְ הוּא יִשְׁמְרֵֽהוּ וְיַצִּילֵֽהוּ מִכׇּל צָרָה וְצוּקָה וּמִכׇּל נֶֽגַע וּמַחֲלָה, וְיִשְׁלַח בְּרָכָה וְהַצְלָחָה בְּכׇל מַעֲשֵׂה יָדָיו עִם כׇּל יִשְׂרָאֵל אֶחָיו; וְנֹאמַר אָמֵן.

Translation:
English translation

He who blessed our fathers Abraham, Isaac and Jacob, may he bless ___ who has come up to honor God and the Torah. May the Holy One, blessed be he, protect and deliver him from all distress and illness, and bless all his efforts with success among all Israel his brethren; and let us say, Amen.

Hebrew (feminine version) (Note: Transliteration: mi shebberach avoteinu, avraham yitzchak veya'akov, hu yevarech et she'aletah lichvod hammakom, velichvod hattorah ___ hakkadosh baruch hu yishmerehu veyatzilehu mikkol tzarah vetzukah umikkol nega umachalah, veyishlach berachah vehatzlachah bechol ma'aseh yadav im kol yisra'el echav; venomar amen.)

מִי שֶׁבֵּרַךְ אֲבוֹתֵֽינוּ, אַבְרָהָם יִצְחָק וְיַֽעֲקֹב, הוּא יְבָרֵךְ אֶת שֶׁעָלְתָה לִכְבוֹד הַמָּקוֹם, וְלִכְבוֹד הַתּוֹרָה ___ הַקָּדוֹשׁ בָּרוּךְ הוּא יִשְׁמְרֵֽהוּ וְיַצִּילֵֽהוּ מִכׇּל צָרָה וְצוּקָה וּמִכׇּל נֶֽגַע וּמַחֲלָה, וְיִשְׁלַח בְּרָכָה וְהַצְלָחָה בְּכׇל מַעֲשֵׂה יָדָיו עִם כׇּל יִשְׂרָאֵל אֶחָיו; וְנֹאמַר אָמֵן.

Translation:
English translation

He who blessed our fathers Abraham, Isaac and Jacob, may he bless ___ who has come up to honor God and the Torah. May the Holy One, blessed be he, protect and deliver her from all distress and illness, and bless all her efforts with success among all Israel her brethren; and let us say, Amen.

A nonbinary-inclusive version approved by Conservative Judaism's Rabbinical Assembly changes בַעֲבּוּר שֶׁעָלָה/שֶׁעָלְתָה (va'abbur she'alah/she'aletah 'because he/she has come up') to בַעֲבּוּר הַעֲלִיָה (va'abbur ha'aliyah 'because of this aliyah') and מִשְפַּחְתּוֹ/מִשְפַּחְתָה (mischpachto/mishpachtah, 'his/her family'—not included in Birnbaum's version) to הַמִשְפַּחָה (hamishpachah 'the family').

=== As a prayer of healing ===
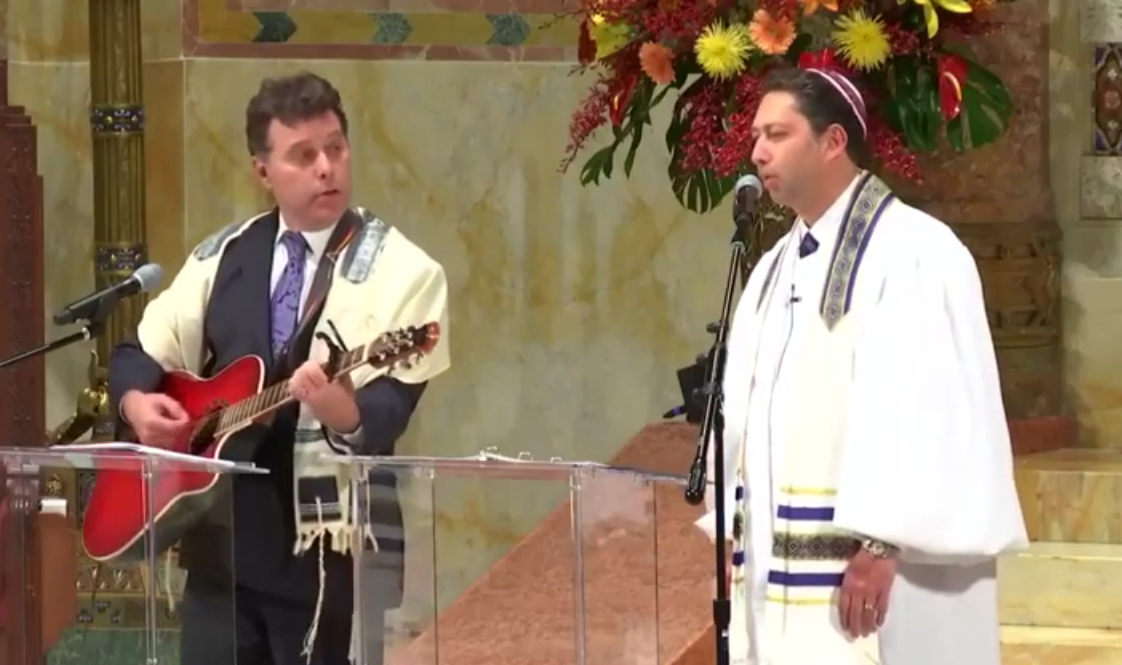
Cantor Mo Glazman and guitarist Saul Kaiserman of Congregation Emanu-El of New York chant Debbie Friedman's setting of the Mi Shebeirach for healing on Rosh Hashanah AM 5777 (2016 CE).

Macy Nulman's Encyclopedia of Jewish Prayer ties the tradition of blessing the sick back to Yoreh De'ah 335:10. While Jewish liturgical names usually refer to people patronymically ("[person's name], child of [father's name]"), a Mi Shebeirach for healing traditionally refers to the sick person by matronym ("[person's name], child of [mother's name]"). Kabbalists teach that this evokes more compassion from God, citing Psalm 86:16, "Turn to me and have mercy on me; ... and deliver the son of your maidservant". Jews in the late medieval and early modern periods used a Mi Shebeirach to pray for the bodies and souls of those not present, while also praying directly for individuals' healing, as they believed all healing was through God's will. A Mi Shebeirach does not, however, fulfill the mitzvah (commandment) of bikur cholim (visiting the sick).

Influenced by German ideals, early Reform Jews in the United States saw healing as a matter for private, rather than communal prayer. Prayer healing became less popular as medicine modernized, and many Reform Jews came to see healing as a purely scientific matter. The Union Prayer Book, published in 1895 and last revised in 1940, lacked any Mi Shebeirach for healing, rather limiting itself to a single line praying to "comfort the sorrowing and cheer the silent sufferers". While the 1975 Reform prayerbook Gates of Prayer was more flexible than its predecessor and restored some older practices, it also had no Mi Shebeirach for healing.

After the AIDS crisis began in the United States in 1981, the Mi Shebeirach and other communal healing prayers began to re-emerge in Reform and other liberal Jewish communities, particularly at LGBTQ synagogues. A few years into the pandemic, Congregation Sha'ar Zahav, a Reform congregation in San Francisco that used its own gender-neutral, gay-inclusive siddur (prayerbook), began a communal Mi Shebeirach written by Garry Koenigsburg and Yoel Kahn, (Note: Not to be confused with Chabad rabbi Yoel Kahn.) praying to heal "all the ill amongst us, and all who have been touched by AIDS and related illness". As there was at the time no effective treatment for HIV/AIDS, and Jewish tradition says that prayers should not be in vain (tefilat shav), Sha'ar Zahav's version emphasized spiritual healing as well as physical. Around the same time, Margaret Wenig, a gay rights activist, began including a Mi Shebeirach in services with her elderly congregation in New York City, although not framed just as a prayer for healing. At the LGBTQ synagogue Beth Chayim Chadashim in Los Angeles, a 1985 siddur supervised by Janet Marder included several prayers for healing, including a Mi Shebeirach blessing the full congregation with health, success, and forgiveness.

Hebrew (masculine version) (Note: Transliteration: mi shebberach avoteinu, avraham yitzchak veya'akov, mosheh ve'aharon, david ushelomoh, hu yevarech virappe et hacholeh ___. hakkadosh baruch hu yimmale rachamim alav lehachalimo ulerappoto, lehachaziko ulehachayoto, veyishlach lo meherah refu'ah shelemah, refu'at hannefesh urefu'at hagguf; venomar amen.)

מִי שֶׁבֵּרַךְ אֲבוֹתֵֽינוּ, אַבְרָהָם יִצְחָק וְיַעֲקֹב, משֶׁה וְאַהֲרֹן, דָּוִד וּשְׁלֹמֹה, הוּא יְבָרֵךְ וִירַפֵּא אֶת הַחוֹלֶה ___. הַקָּדוֹשׁ בָּרוּךְ הוּא יִמָּלֵא רַחֲמִים עָלָיו לְהַחֲלִימוֹ וּלְרַפֹּאתוֹ, לְהַחֲזִיקוֹ וּלְהַחֲיוֹתוֹ, וְיִשְׁלַח לוֹ מְהֵרָה רְפוּאָה שְׁלֵמָה, רְפוּאַת הַנֶּֽפֶשׁ וּרְפוּאַת הַגּוּף; וְנֹאמַר אָמֵן.

Translation:
English translation

He who blessed our fathers Abraham, Isaac and Jacob, Moses and Aaron, David and Solomon, may he heal ___ who is ill. May the Holy One, blessed be he, have mercy and speedily restore him to perfect health, both spiritual and physical; and let us say, Amen.

Hebrew (feminine version) (Note: Transliteration: mi shebberach avoteinu, avraham yitzchak veya'akov, mosheh ve'aharon, david ushelomoh, hu yevarech virappe et hacholah ___. hakkadosh baruch hu yimmale rachamim aleiha lehachalimah ulerappotah, lehachazikah ulehachayotah, veyishlach lah meherah refu'ah shelemah, refu'at hannefesh urefu'at hagguf; venomar amen.)

מִי שֶׁבֵּרַךְ אֲבוֹתֵֽינוּ, אַבְרָהָם יִצְחָק וְיַעֲקֹב, משֶׁה וְאַהֲרֹן, דָּוִד וּשְׁלֹמֹה, הוּא יְבָרֵךְ וִירַפֵּא אֶת הַחוֹלָה ___. הַקָּדוֹשׁ בָּרוּךְ הוּא יִמָּלֵא רַחֲמִים עָלֶיהָ לְהַחֲלִימָהּ וּלְרַפֹּאתָהּ, לְהַחֲזִיקָהּ וּלְהַחֲיוֹתָהּ, וְיִשְׁלַח לָהּ מְהֵרָה רְפוּאָה שְׁלֵמָה, רְפוּאַת הַנֶּֽפֶשׁ וּרְפוּאַת הַגּוּף; וְנֹאמַר אָמֵן.

Translation:
English translation

He who blessed our fathers Abraham, Isaac and Jacob, Moses and Aaron, David and Solomon, may he heal ___ who is ill. May the Holy One, blessed be he, have mercy and speedily restore her to perfect health, both spiritual and physical; and let us say, Amen.

==== Friedman and Setel's version ====
"Mi Shebeirach"

Song by Debbie Friedman

from the album And You Shall Be a Blessing
- Released: 1989
- Studio: Sounds Write Productions
- Songwriters: Friedman, Drorah Setel

Debbie Friedman was part of a wave of Jewish folk singers that began in the 1960s. Throughout the 1980s, as she lost many friends to AIDS and separately several to cancer, she traveled across the country performing at sickbeds. From 1984 to 1987, she lived with Rabbi Drorah Setel, then her romantic partner, who worked with AIDS Project Los Angeles.

Marcia "Marty" Cohn Spiegel, a Jewish feminist activist familiar with Mi Shebeirach as a prayer of healing from her Conservative background, asked the couple to write a version of the prayer. Like the Sha'ar Zahav Mi Shebeirach, Friedman and Setel's version emphasized spiritual healing in the face of a disease which most at the time were unlikely to survive. Refuah shleima ('full healing') was defined as the renewal, rather than repair, of body and spirit. Using a mix of Hebrew and English, a trend begun by Friedman in the 1970s, the two chose to include the Jewish matriarchs as well as the patriarchs to "express the empowerment of those reciting and hearing the prayer". After the initial mi sheiberach avoteinu ('May the one who blessed our fathers'), they added makor habrachah l'imoteinu ('source of blessing for our mothers'). The first two words come from Lekha Dodi; makor ('source'), while grammatically masculine, is often used in modern feminist liturgy to evoke childbirth. Friedman and Setel then reversed avoteinu and imoteinu in the second Hebrew verse in order to avoid gendering God.

Friedman and Setel wrote the prayer in October 1987. It was first used in a Simchat Hochmah (celebration of wisdom) service at Congregation Ner Tamid celebrating Cohn Spiegel's eldering, led by Setel, openly lesbian rabbi Sue Levi Elwell, and feminist liturgist Marcia Falk. Friedman included the song on her albums And You Shall Be a Blessing (1989) and Renewal of Spirit (1995) and performed it at Jewish conferences including those of the Coalition for the Advancement of Jewish Education, through which it spread to Jewish communities across the United States. "Mi Shebeirach" became Friedman's most popular song. She performed it at almost every concert, prefacing it with "This is for you" before singing it once on her own and then once with the audience.

==== Analysis ====
By specifying refuah shleima as healing of both body (refuat haguf) and spirit (refuat hanefesh)—a commonality across denominations—the Mi Shebeirach for healing emphasizes that both physical and mental illness ought to be treated. The prayer uses the Š-L-M root, the same used in the Hebrew word shalom 'peace'. While refuah in Hebrew refers to both healing and curing, the contemporary American Jewish context emphasizes the distinction between the two concepts, with the Mi Shebeirach a prayer of the former rather than the latter. Nonetheless, Rabbi Julie Pelc Adler critiques the Mi Shebeirach as inapplicable to chronic illness and proposes a different prayer for such cases. Liberal Jewish commentary on the Mi Shebeirach for healing often emphasizes that it is not a form of faith healing, that it seeks a spiritual rather than physical healing, and that healing is not sought only for those who are named.

Friedman and Setel's setting has drawn particular praise, including for its bilingual nature, which makes it at once traditional and accessible. It is one of several Friedman pieces that have been called "musical midrash". Lyrically, through asking God to "help us find the courage to make our lives a blessing", it emphasizes the agency of the person praying. Its melody resembles that of a ballad; like the traditional nusach (chant) for the Mi Shebeirach for healing, it is set in a major key. Drinkwater views the modern Mi Shebeirach for healing as providing a "fundamentally queer insight" and frames it as part of a transformation in Judaism away from "narratives of wholeness, purity, and perfection".

==== Use ====
The Mi Shebeirach of healing was added to the Reform siddur Mishkan T'filah in 2007, comprising a three-sentence blessing in Hebrew and English praying for a "complete renewal of body and spirit" for those who are ill, and the lyrics to Friedman and Setel's version. By the time it was added, it had already become, according to Drinkwater, "ubiquitous in Reform settings ... and in many non-Reform settings throughout the world". Drinkwater casts it as "the emotional highlight of synagogue services for countless Jews". Elyse Frishman, Mishkan T'filah's editor, described including it as a "crystal clear" choice and that Friedman's setting had already been "canonized". The prayer is now seen as central to liberal Jewish ritual. In contemporary usage, to say "I'll say a Mi Shebeirach for you" generally refers to the Mi Shebeirach for healing.

Starting in the 1990s, Flam and Kahn's idea of a healing service spread across the United States, with the Mi Shebeirach for healing at its core. In time this practice has diminished, as healing has been more incorporated into other aspects of Jewish life. Many synagogues maintain "Mi Shebeirach lists" of names to read on Shabbat. Some Jews include on preoperative checklists that they should be added to their congregations' Mi Shebeirach lists. The lists also serve to make the community aware that someone is ill, which can be beneficial but can also present problems in cases of stigmatized illnesses. In some congregations, congregants with ill loved ones line up and the rabbi says the prayer. In more liberal ones, the rabbi will ask congregants to list names, and the congregant will then sing either the traditional Mi Shebeirach for healing or Friedman and Setel's version. Sometimes congregants wrap one another in tallitot (prayer shawls) or hold shawls above one another.

Use of the Mi Shebeirach for mental illness or addiction is complicated by social stigma. Some may embrace the Mi Shebeirach as a chance to spread awareness in their community, while others may seek anonymity. Essayist Stephen Fried has advocated for the Mi Shebeirach for healing as an opportunity for rabbis "to reinforce that mental illness and substance use disorders 'count' as medical conditions for which you can offer prayers of healing".

The prayer is often used in Jewish chaplaincy. A number of versions exist for specific roles and scenarios in healthcare. Silverman, who conducted an ethnographic study of liberal Jews in Tucson, recounts attending a cancer support group for Jewish women that closed with Friedman's version of the Mi Shebeirach, even though a number of the group's members had described themselves as being irreligious or not praying. She found that while the Mi Shebeirach of healing resonated widely, many participants were unaware how new the Friedman version was. As Friedman lay dying of pneumonia in 2011 after two decades of chronic illness, many North American congregations sang her and Setel's "Mi Shebeirach". Setel wrote in The Jewish Daily Forward that, while people's Mi Shebeirach prayers for Friedman "did not prevent Debbie's death, ... neither were they offered in vain".
