= LGBTQ synagogue =

LGBTQ synagogues (historically known as gay and lesbian synagogues) are synagogues primarily serving LGBTQ Jews. LGBTQ synagogues date to 1970, with the oldest extant one, Beth Chayim Chadashim (BCC) in Los Angeles, established in 1972. Their religious doctrines vary, but are generally liberal; many affiliate with the Reform movement and one with Reconstructionism, while others, such as Congregation Beit Simchat Torah (CBST) in New York City, are independent. Many use custom liturgy shaped by the LGBTQ experience and Jewish feminism, often using degenderized terms to refer to God. LGBTQ synagogues are largely found in the United States, although one, Beit Klal Yisrael, exists in London.

Early LGBTQ synagogues emerged alongside and with the help of the LGBTQ-affirming Metropolitan Community Church. The synagogues' growth was heavily shaped by the AIDS crisis in the 1980s, which in some congregations killed close to half of the membership. The ministry of Rabbi Yoel Kahn at Congregation Sha'ar Zahav was influential on liberal Jewish attitudes toward AIDS throughout the United States. LGBTQ synagogues mourning losses from AIDS created the modern Mi Shebeirach for healing, a prayer previously absent in most liberal Jewish practice. Debbie Friedman and Rabbi Drorah Setel, a lesbian couple with ties to BCC, debuted their well-known setting of the prayer in 1987. The prayer is now seen as central to liberal Jewish ritual.

BCC's admission into the Reform movement in 1974 was the first formal recognition of a gay and lesbian congregation by a national mainstream denomination of any world religion. The Reform movement has since become strongly LGBTQ-affirming, which has contributed to a decrease in attendance at LGBTQ synagogues as LGBTQ Jews feel more comfortable in non-LGBTQ-oriented spaces. At least three Reform LGBTQ synagogues have merged into larger Reform synagogues in the 21st century. At the same time, non-LGBTQ attendance has risen at LGBTQ synagogues, with some positioning themselves as homes for other marginalized groups. The largest LGBTQ synagogue, CBST, has about 1,000 members as of 2024.

== History ==
=== Origins and recognition (1970–1982) ===
LGBTQ people were marginalized in the American Jewish community of the 1960s. Traditional Jews considered sex between men a sin on the basis of Leviticus 18:22, which condemns "l[ying] with a man as ... with a woman", and used this to justify said marginalization. The Stonewall riots of 1969 led to the birth of the modern gay rights movement, and with it greater awareness among LGBTQ Jews of hostility in synagogues. The spread of the Metropolitan Community Church, an LGBTQ-affirming Christian denomination founded in 1968, inspired more organization among LGBTQ Jews. This included both Jewish organizations—the first being the Jewish Gay and Lesbian Group in London, England, in 1972—and, in the United States, synagogues.

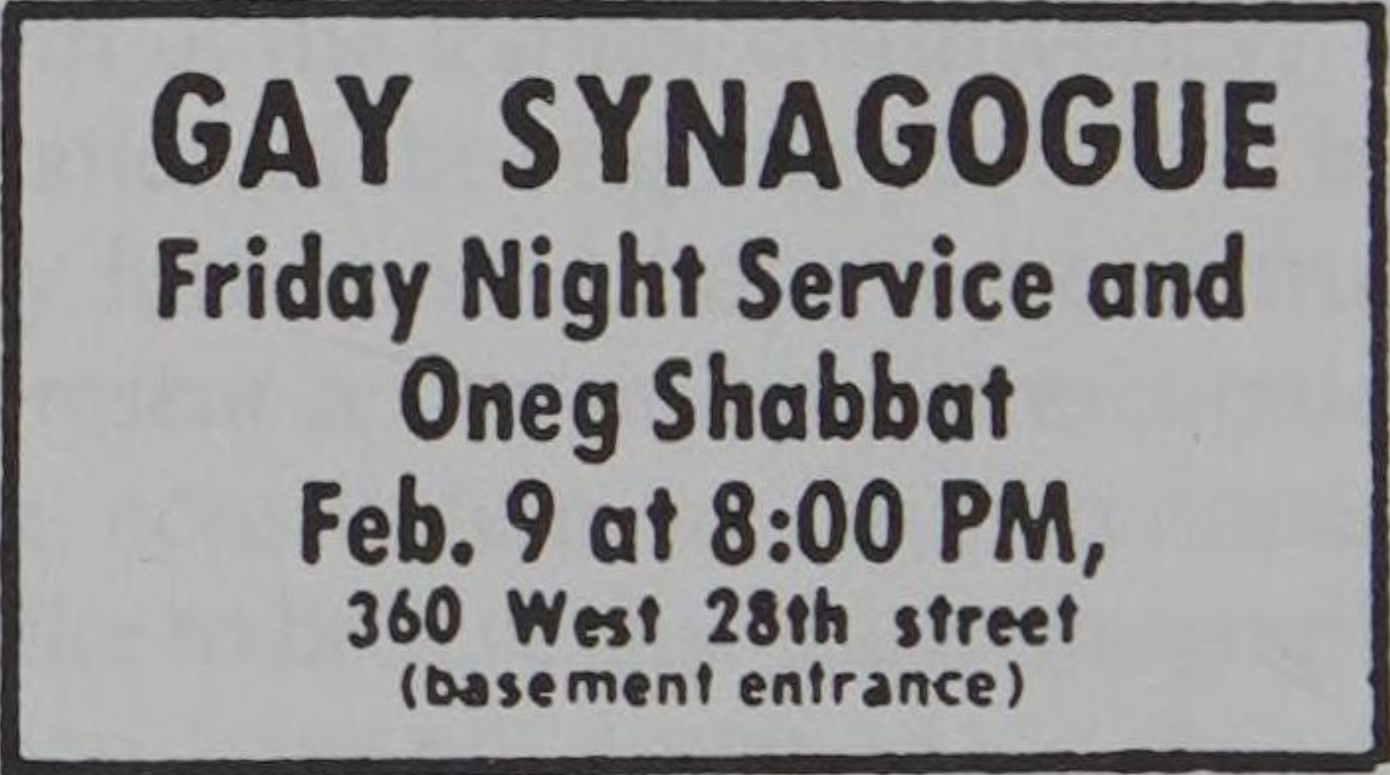
A classified ad in The Village Voice announcing the first meeting of Congregation Beth Simchat Torah

The world's first gay and lesbian synagogue was the House of David and Jonathan, founded by Rabbi Herbert Katz in New York City in 1970. It received little support and shut down after six weeks. The Metropolitan Community Temple was founded in Los Angeles two years later by Jews who would meet at the local MCC. They later took the name Beth Chayim Chadashim (BCC), meaning "House of New Life", a reference to the MCC's newsletter, New Life. Due to the House of David and Jonathan's short lifespan, BCC is often considered the first gay and lesbian synagogue. Several other early gay and lesbian synagogues were born of ties to the MCC, including Congregation Beth Simchat Torah (CBST; spelling later changed to Beit) in New York City in 1973 and the Metropolitan Community Synagogue in Miami in 1974 (renamed Congregation Etz Chaim the next year). CBST, which grew to more than 100 members in two years, leased a location of its own in 1975, having previously met at the Episcopalian Church of the Holy Apostles. BCC bought a property in Pico-Robertson in 1978.

"We are in a Catch-22 situation, the place we probably belong is the Conservative movement, but because they are still grappling with the issue of homosexuality, we have to go to the Reform or Reconstructionists for help."

— Arthur S. Leonard, co-chairman of CBST's rabbinic search committee, as quoted in 1991

After controversy including an opposing responsum from the Reform movement's Central Conference of American Rabbis (CCAR), the Union of American Hebrew Congregations (UAHC, now the Union for Reform Judaism) admitted BCC in July 1974, by a vote of 61 to 22 among the Executive Committee's Board of Trustees. The admission of BCC differed from other pro-LGBTQ decisions of the UAHC/URJ in that it was led by laity rather than the rabbinate. Across all world religions, BCC's admission to UAHC was the first formal recognition of a gay and lesbian congregation by a national mainstream denomination. Etz Chaim, Congregation Beth Ahavah (Philadelphia), Or Chadash of Chicago, and Congregation Sha'ar Zahav (CSZ) of San Francisco joined the UAHC in the following decade. A number of other gay and lesbian synagogues either joined or became linked to the UAHC, while Congregation Bet Haverim in Atlanta joined Reconstructionist Judaism. Notably, however, CBST elected for independence from any stream of Judaism. Affiliations notwithstanding, gay and lesbian synagogues had members with diverse backgrounds within Judaism, from Reform to Orthodox, and often chose to create their own liturgies drawing from this blend of traditions. In some synagogues this shifted to a more mainstream liturgy over time.

Tensions over gender were a defining aspect of gay and lesbian synagogues at this era. Jewish feminists and gay and lesbian Jews heavily overlapped. Feminist complaints about gendered liturgical language led BCC to print the first genderless prayerbook in 1975, but perceived sexism by male congregation leaders led to repeated conflicts with the minority of woman congregants. CBST likewise saw conflict over the role of women, with some men favoring traditional views over the feminism espoused in the prayerbook (which was degenderized a few years after BCC's). In 1979, CSZ became the first gay and lesbian congregation to hire a rabbi—Allen B. Bennett, the first openly gay rabbi in the U.S. In CSZ's horizontal, feminist structure, the decision to hire a rabbi at all was controversial, leading to a wave of resignations by women, although some subsequently returned.

=== AIDS crisis, Mi Shebeirach, and Jewish healing (1982–1992) ===
The trajectory of gay and lesbian synagogues in the United States was deeply shaped by the AIDS crisis, which began in 1982. The synagogues' reaction to the crisis played a major role in the formation of the Jewish healing movement and the reintroduction of the Mi Shebeirach for healing, which had fallen out of use in Reform settings in the 1800s.

CSZ began using a communal Mi Shebeirach written by Garry Koenigsburg and Rabbi Yoel Kahn, praying to heal "all the ill amongst us, and all who have been touched by AIDS and related illness". At BCC, a 1985 prayerbook supervised by Rabbi Janet Marder included several prayers for healing, including a Mi Shebeirach blessing the full congregation with health, success, and forgiveness. Debbie Friedman and Rabbi Drorah Setel, a lesbian couple with ties to the BCC-affiliated AIDS Project Los Angeles and many gay and lesbian Jewish leaders, debuted their well-known setting of Mi Shebeirach in 1987. The prayer is now seen as central to liberal Jewish ritual, to the extent that in one ethnographic study many Jews were unaware of how recently Friedman and Setel's version was written.

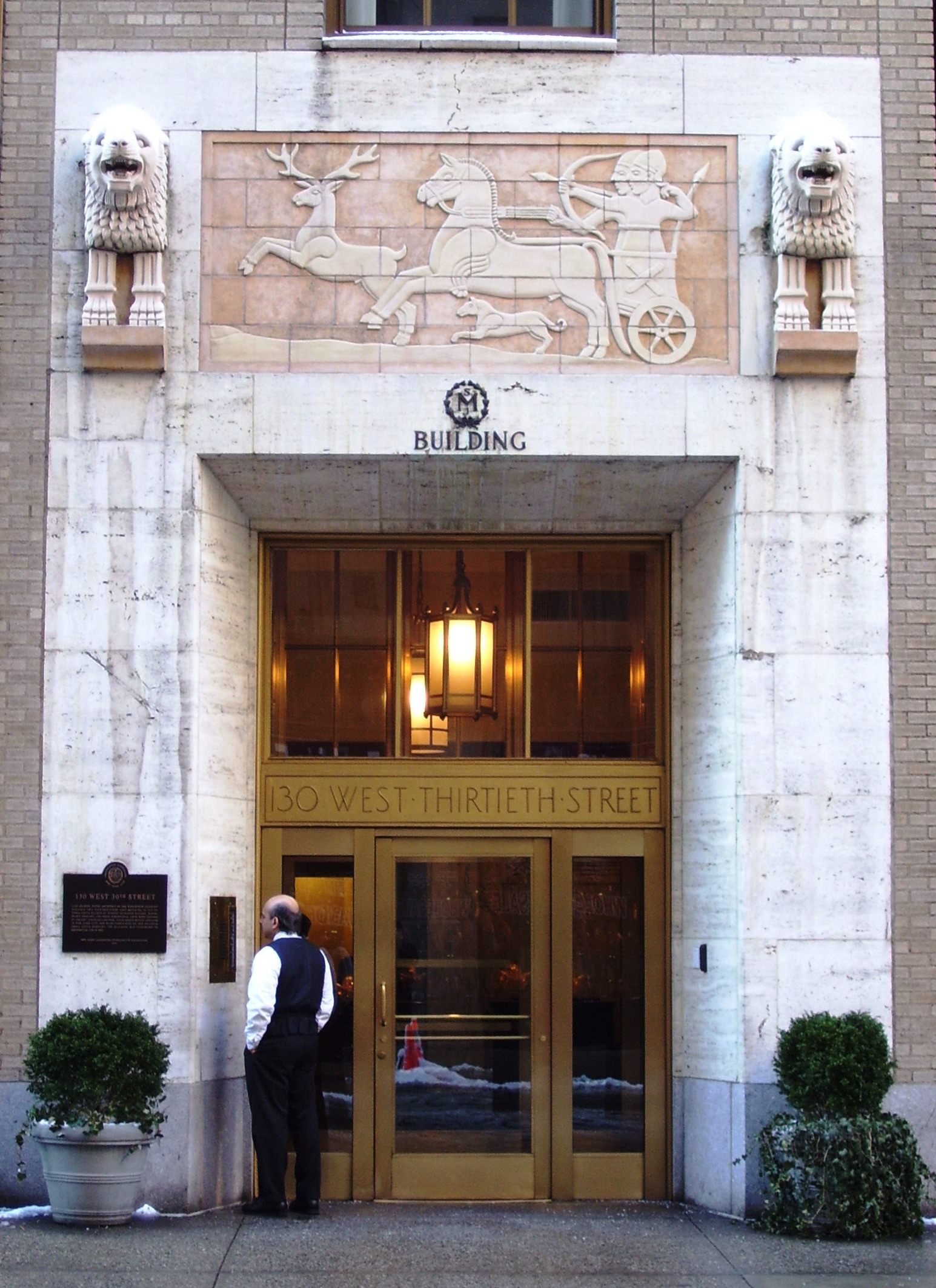
Congregation Beit Simchat Torah in New York

At CSZ, the response to AIDS also led to the healing of rifts between men and women in the community. Addressing the AIDS crisis became a major part of CSZ's identity, much like the affiliated San Francisco MCC. The AIDS-related deaths of 80 of 201 members contributed to a slowing of the congregation's momentum. In Los Angeles, AIDS killed 30 members of BCC. In New York, CBST participated in the founding of Gay Men's Health Crisis and ACT UP, while AIDS killed almost half of its male active members. Its members were called upon to serve as a stand-in family for those whose birth families would not attend their funerals or only did so reluctantly.

Gay and lesbian synagogues, in addition to working to comfort dying members, also lobbied national Jewish organizations to acknowledge the pandemic. CSZ in particular was influential due to San Francisco's status as the capital of American gay culture. Kahn's 1985 Yom Kippur sermon "AIDS is Our Earthquake" and a similar sermon delivered the same day by Robert Kirschner at Congregation Emanu-El, a nearby primarily straight congregation, were influential in shaping liberal American Jewish attitudes to AIDS, as LGBTQ and progressive synagogues advocated for stronger responses by the UAHC, the United Synagogue of Conservative Judaism, and the Orthodox Union.

In 1988, Kahn created a new liturgy for healing, incorporating CSZ's Mi Shebeirach for healing of people with AIDS, and began conducting healing services with it. Rabbi Nancy Flam subsequently took over the services and adapted them. This adapted version was later distributed nationwide by the National Center for Jewish Healing from the mid-1990s onward, birthing the Jewish healing movement.

Sheila Shulman, one of the United Kingdom's first two openly lesbian rabbis, founded Beit Klal Yisrael in 1990 as the country's first LGBTQ synagogue, with assistance from Lionel Blue, the UK's first openly gay rabbi. Amidst tensions between gay men and women, the congregation initially did not invite men, but attitudes warmed in the community as gay and lesbian Jews united in their opposition to Section 28, an anti-gay law.

=== Mainstream influence and decline in attendance (1992–present) ===
In the 1980s, CSZ had been the most influential gay and lesbian synagogue, with Kahn one of the most visible Reform rabbis in the country. On the other side of the country, the proudly lay-led CBST, almost a thousand strong by 1989 and under the pressures of the AIDS crisis, for the first time sought a rabbi. In March 1992 they hired Sharon Kleinbaum, a Reconstructionist, marking a significant improvement from past gender-based tensions at the congregation. By 2001, CBST was the largest gay and lesbian synagogue in the world, with Kleinbaum leading it beyond its substantial local influence in New York, onto the international stage. Starting with a Hadassah event in 1998, national non-LGBTQ Jewish organizations began working more with CBST.

In the 1990s and 2000s, liberal Jewish movements enacted a number of policies in support of LGBTQ rights. This normalization led to decreased interest among LGBTQ Jews in attending LGBTQ synagogues, while the percentage of non-LGBTQ congregants at LGBTQ synagogues has risen. Chevrei Tikva in Cleveland Heights, Ohio, merged into Anshe Chesed Fairmount Temple in 2005. Congregation Or Chadash in Chicago merged into Temple Sholom in 2016. In 2017, ethnographer Sonia Crasnow observed that Am Tikva in Boston was suffering low attendance, while BCC's attendance was steady but skewed middle-aged. Synagogues have taken a variety of strategies to counter this: Some, such as Beit Haverim in Atlanta, have sought to attract Jews of color as another demographic often marginalized from traditional Jewish spaces. CSZ has positioned itself as a popular choice for potential converts. As of 2024, the largest LGBTQ congregation is CBST, with around 1,000 members and High Holy Days attendance of about 4,000.

== Liturgy and practice ==
LGBTQ synagogues have, since their inception, created new rituals and pieces of liturgy. CBST's first prayerbook, put together by a single member, did not touch on gay topics. Its successor, "With All Your Heart" (1981), was informed by the gay and lesbian experience. Translations made reference to the struggles and hardships members had endured, and went as far as to interpolate the word "gay" into several prayers. One prayer combined Isaiah 56 and 58, translating sarisim as 'the childless' rather than the more standard 'eunuchs', referencing gays and lesbians, who at the time rarely had children. BCC's early liturgy was in line with Reform norms, using the Reform Union Prayer Book among others from inception, but members added gay-themed prayers over time, initially through subtle references but later more explicitly. BCC and CBST engaged in cultural exchanges, and as more gay and lesbian synagogues emerged, practices and liturgy spread among them.

Gender is a key aspect of LGBTQ liturgy. The degenderization of liturgy, including in references to God and the patriarchs and matriarchs, was a focus in early liturgical developments at BCC, CBST, and CSZ. "With All Your Heart" inserted reference to the matriarchs into the Amidah; the implementation of this inclusion was a subsequent point of contention in the congregation. The use of English, rather than Hebrew, may help to degenderize texts. Some liturgy conceptualizes God as a feminine entity.

LGBTQ synagogues were instrumental in the spread of prayers for healing in liberal Judaism. Yoel Kahn's healing liturgy, which became the model for Jewish healing services nationwide, adapted traditional prayers from the CSZ siddur. At a time when there was no effective treatment for HIV/AIDS, CSZ's Mi Shebeirach emphasized spiritual healing as well as physical, as Jewish tradition says that prayers should not be in vain. Friedman and Setel's version similarly emphasized spiritual healing in the face of a disease which most at the time were unlikely to survive. Refuah shleima ('full healing') was defined as the renewal, rather than repair, of body and spirit. Using a mix of Hebrew and English, a trend begun by Friedman in the 1970s, the two chose to include the matriarchs as well as the patriarchs to "express the empowerment of those reciting and hearing the prayer". After the initial "mi sheiberach avoteinu" ('May the one who blessed our fathers'), they added "makor habrachah l'imoteinu" ('source of blessing for our mothers'). The first two words come from Lekha Dodi; makor ('source'), while grammatically masculine, is often used in modern feminist liturgy to evoke childbirth. Friedman and Setel then reversed "avoteinu" and "imoteinu" in the second Hebrew verse in order to avoid gendering God.

In 2020, the CCAR published Mishkan Ga'avah: Where Pride Dwells, a collection of LGBTQ liturgy and rituals from the Reform tradition.

== List of LGBTQ synagogues ==
‡ denotes synagogues that have merged. # denotes synagogues that have shut down. All others listed remain extant as of January 2025.

Synagogue (translation of name)	Founded	Location	Affiliation, if any	Notes
House of David and Jonathan^{#}	1970	New York City, New York		Folded after six weeks
Beth Chayim Chadashim ('House of New Life')	1972	Los Angeles, California	Reform	Called the Metropolitan Community Temple for its first seven months
Congregation Beit Simchat Torah ('House of Gladness in the Torah')	1973	New York City, New York		Beit originally spelled Beth
Congregation Etz Chaim ('Tree of Life')	1974	Miami, Florida	Reform	Called the Metropolitan Community Synagogue for its first year
Congregation Or Chadash^{‡} ('New Light')	1975	Chicago, Illinois	Reform	Merged into Temple Sholom in 2016
Bet Mishpachah ('House of Family')	1975	Washington, D.C.		Called the Metropolitan Community Temple Mishpocheh until 1980
Beth Ahavah^{‡} ('House of Love')	1975	Philadelphia, Pennsylvania	Reform	Merged into Congregation Rodeph Shalom in 2015
Congregation Am Tikva ('Nation of Hope')	1976	Brookline, Massachusetts		
Congregation Sha'ar Zahav ('Golden Gate')	1976	San Francisco, California	Reform	
Congregation Aytz Chayim# ('Tree of Life')	1980	Houston, Texas		Folded in 1990.
Congregation Tikvah Chadashah ('New Hope')	1980	Seattle, Washington		
Ahavat Shalom^{#} ('Love of Peace')	1982	San Francisco, California		Split off from Sha'ar Zahav; folded in 1990
Chevrei Tikva^{‡} ('Friends of Hope')	1983	Cleveland Heights, Ohio	Reform	Merged into Anshe Chesed Fairmount Temple in 2005, which in turn merged with Temple Tifereth-Israel in 2024 to become Congregation Mishkan Or
Congregation Bet Haverim ('House of Friends')	1985	Atlanta, Georgia	Reconstructionist	
Bet Tikvah ('House of Hope')	1989	Pittsburgh, Pennsylvania		
Beth El Binah ('House of Understanding God')	1989	Dallas, Texas	Reform	
Beit Klal Yisrael ('House of All Israel')	1990	London, England	Liberal	

In addition to LGBTQ synagogues that have merged into others, many congregations in LGBTQ-affirming denominations have established their own LGBTQ chavurot, outreach groups, or similar.

Congregation Kol Ami in West Hollywood, California, was founded by LGBTQ people, has many LGBTQ members, and is sometimes referred to as an LGBTQ synagogue, but does not refer to itself as such.

According to Moshe Shokeid's A Gay Synagogue in New York, Jacob Gubbay, the Indian-born founder of Congregation Beit Simchat Torah, moved to Australia and founded a congregation called Beth Simcha in Bondi Beach, New South Wales. Little is known about Gubbay's fate subsequently, and as of 2023 no such congregation is listed by Dayenu, a Jewish LGBTQ+ organization for the Sydney area.
