= Eldering (surname) =

Eldering is a surname. Notable people with the surname include:

- Bram Eldering (1865-1943), Dutch violinist and music pedagogue
- Grace Eldering (1900-1988), American public health scientist
- Les Eldering (1938-2003, Australian rules footballer

== See also ==
- Elder (disambiguation)
- Eldering, a term originally used by the Quakers to denote the religious training and education of young adults
