= NWSS =

NWSS may refer to:

- New Westminster Secondary School
- Native Woodland Survey of Scotland
- National Water Services Strategy, part of the Kenyan government's strategy for water supply and sanitation in Kenya
- National Wastewater Surveillance System, also known as the Centers for Disease Control and Prevention's wastewater monitoring program.
- North West Surrey Synagogue
- Nuclear War Survival Skills, a civil defense manual in the United States
- Navy WWMCCS Standard Software
