= YQ =

YQ or yq may refer to:

- Lakeland Airlines (former IATA code: YQ), in the List of defunct airlines of the United States (J–P)
- Polet Flight (former IATA code: YQ), a defunct Russian airline
- Young Quaker, a monthly magazine
- yq (command), a wrapper program for the programming language jq
