= European and Middle Eastern Young Friends =

Quaker organization based in Europe

European and Middle East Young Friends
- Founded: 1984
- Founder: 5 members of the Religious Society of Friends
- Location: Brussels, Belgium
- Region served: Europe, Middle East, Russia
- Website: www.emeyf.org

European and Middle East Young Friends (EMEYF) is a Quaker organisation based in Europe for young Quaker adults. Its aims are to fostering communication amongst, and spread information about, young Friends communities in different parts of Europe and the Middle East.

EMEYF is run autonomously by young Friends aged 18–35. It was set up by young Friends in 1984 as a body within the larger Europe and Middle East Section of the international Friends World Committee for Consultation. A broader aim of the organisation is to give young Friends a voice within the wider Society of Friends and to pursue concerns typically embodied by the Quaker testimonies.

== Structure ==
EMEYF has a number of honorary roles. It appoints a Quaker Clerk, Secretary, Treasurer, UK Charitable Treasurer, Gatherings Coordinator, two Elders, a representative that sits on the Council of the Quaker Council for European Affairs, a representative that sits on the Europe and Middle East Section Executive Committee, and four United Kingdom Charitable Committee members.

From these honorary roles the Communications Committee is formed, which consists of the Clerk, Secretary, Treasurer, UK Charitable Treasurer, Gatherings Coordinator, and the two Elders. The Communications Committee is responsible for the overall running of the organisation.

=== Secretariat ===
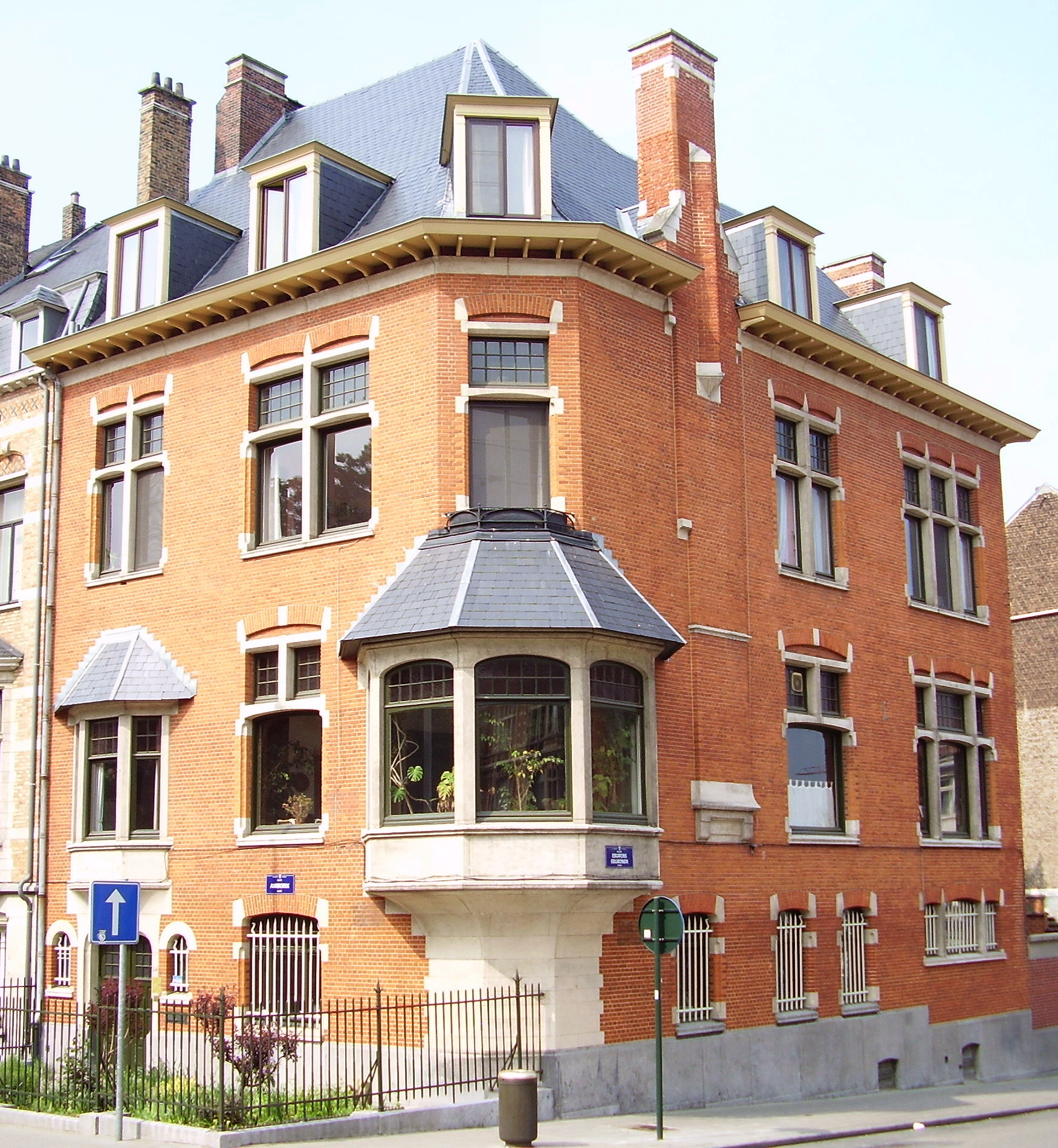
Quaker House in Brussels, EMEYF's base

The EMEYF secretary is often a Programme Assistant of the Quaker Council for European Affairs and is based in Quaker House, Brussels. Amongst other duties, each year the secretary compiles the EMEYF Annual Report.

== Gatherings ==
EMEYF operates across a wide geographic area. There are two main physical meetings each year.

=== Spring Gathering ===
Every spring EMEYF celebrates their Spring Gathering which is held in a different country each year. As the organisation's main spiritual fixture, Spring Gathering has the aims of supporting isolated young Friends, deepening the spirituality of members and developing relationships within the group through worship, discussion and a variety of activities.

Previous Spring Gatherings have been held in: Germany (1985), Ireland (1986), Denmark (1987), Netherlands (1988), West Germany (1989), Scotland (1990), East Germany (1991), Norway (1992), England (1993), Netherlands (1994), Ireland (1995), Denmark (1996), Germany (1997), England (1998), Russia (1999), Ireland (2000), Sweden (2001), Scotland (2002), Hungary (2003), France (2004), Netherlands (2005), Spain (2006), Russia (2007), Austria (2008), Syria (2009), Northern Ireland (2010), Switzerland (2011) (...), North-Macedonia (2014), Georgia (2015), All-age gathering in Germany (2016), Poland (2017), Northern-Ireland (2018), Russia (2019), Online (2020, 2021), Summer gathering in Germany (2022), France (2023), Austria (2024), Sweden (2025).

=== Annual meeting ===
Every autumn, an annual meeting is held by EMEYF holds in the form of a business meeting. At the EMEYF annual business meeting members share their activities of the past year, test and pursue the organisation's concerns, and practise the business method of the Religious Society of Friends. The meetings tend to be held at Quaker House in Brussels or at Friends Meeting House in Bad Pyrmont, Germany. A Communications Committee meeting is also held once a year around March to cover any business that has arisen between annual meetings. The Annual and Communications Committee meetings are the main decision-making times of the organisation.

== See also ==
- Young Friends General Meeting
