= Kol Ami (Tucson, Arizona) =

Reform Jewish synagogue in Arizona, US

Kol Ami Synagogue
- Location in Arizona

Religion
- Affiliation: Reform Judaism
- Ecclesiastical or organisational status: Synagogue
- Leadership: Rabbi Malcolm Cohen; Cantor Jennifer Benrey
- Status: Active

Location
- Location: 225 North Country Club Road, Tucson, Arizona 85716
- Country: United States
- Coordinates: 32°13′26″N 110°55′37″W

Architecture
- Architect: Eli Blount (Note: Some sources list as Ely.) (1910)
- Type: Synagogue architecture
- Established: c. 2019 (merged congregation): 1910 (Temple Emanu-El); 1995 (Congregation Or Chadash)
- Completed: 1910 (TE: Stone Avenue); 1949 (TE: Country Club Road); 2002 (OC: address unknown)

Website
- katucson.org

Tucson Jewish Museum & Holocaust Center
- Location in Arizona
- Established: 2005
- Location: 564 South Stone Avenue, Tucson, Arizona 85701-2308
- Coordinates: 32°12′51″N 110°58′13″W
- Type: Jewish museum
- Director: Lori Shepherd
- Website: www.tjmhc.org
- Temple Emanu-El (1910)
- U.S. Historic district – Contributing property
- Interactive map
- Location: 564 South Stone Avenue, Tucson, Arizona 85701
- Coordinates: 32°12′51″N 110°58′13″W
- Built: 1910
- Architect: Eli Blount
- Part of: Barrio Libre Historic District (ID78000565)
- Designated CP: October 18, 1978

Kol Ami Synagogue (Kol Ami) is a Reform Jewish congregation and synagogue located at 225 North Country Club Road, in Tucson, Arizona, in the United States. The congregation was formed through the 2021 consolidation of Temple Emanu-El (established in 1910 as The Hebrew Benevolent Society) and the Congregation Or Chadash, that was established in 1995. The leaders of Temple Emanu-El and Congregation Or Chadash began discussions about a potential merger in 2018. The merger of the two Reform congregations was consummated the following year, as Kol Ami.

Rabbi Malcolm Cohen joined Kol Ami in July 2022 and Cantor Jennifer Benrey join Kol Ami in July 2024.

As The Hebrew Benevolent Society, it was the first synagogue in the Arizona Territory and is the oldest congregation in the state; Emanu-el's original building, known as the Stone Avenue Temple, was built in 1910 and is the oldest synagogue building in Arizona. This Stone Avenue building, listed as a contributing property on the National Register of Historic Places, has since been repurposed as the Tucson Jewish Museum & Holocaust Center.

== History ==
=== Temple Emanu-El ===
The Jewish community had been meeting for prayer for some years and had begun raising funds for a synagogue in 1905. The congregation was incorporated March 20, 1910, as The Hebrew Benevolent Society and dedicated the first synagogue building, the Stone Avenue Temple, the first synagogue built in the Arizona Territory, on October 3, 1910, the eve of Rosh Hashanah.

In 1949 the congregation moved to a new building on North Country Club Road.

==== Stone Avenue Temple ====
Emanu-El's original building, the Stone Avenue Temple, was a brick structure designed by Ely Blount. Blount blended a pedimented, pilastered Greek Revival façade with rounded windows and twin towers in Rundbogenstil style. In 1937 the building was covered with stucco. The original stained-glass windows have been lost. In 1982, the building was listed in on the National Register of Historic Places as part of the Barrio Libre Historic District. Efforts to preserve the synagogue garnered national attention when it received the National Preservation Honor Award from the National Trust for Historic Preservation. The building currently houses the Tucson Jewish Museum & Holocaust Center.

===== The museum =====
The Tucson Jewish Museum & Holocaust Center, formerly known as the Jewish History Museum, and the Jewish Heritage Center of the Southwest, is a Jewish museum that was created in 2005 by the merger of the non-profit that was formed to rescue the building from destruction in 1998 – The Historic Stone Avenue Temple Project – with the Jewish Historical Society of Southern Arizona. The museum's building was the first synagogue built in the Arizona territory. The Holocaust museum serves as a center to advocate for the victims of the holocaust by telling survivor stories, specifically from survivors that now reside in Tucson, Arizona.

In addition to its permanent collection, the museum hosts exhibitions, lectures, the annual Ketubah and Antique wedding gown exhibit and the Jewish Storytelling Festival as well as is the home of the Jewish Arizona Oral History Project.

=== Congregation Or Chadash ===
The congregation was formed on August 18, 1995, under the direction of Rabbi Thomas Louchheim, who previously was employed as an Assistant Rabbi at Temple Emanuel-El. The congregation was gifted a Torah from B’nai Sholem, an Orthodox congregation in St. Joseph, Missouri. The congregation started a Jewish school and had over 104 students by late 1999.

A 4.2-acre (1.7 ha) property was purchased in 2002 with the assistance of donations and borrowings; and the 400,000-square-foot (37,000 m^{2}) house converted into a chapel, education facilities, and administrative offices.

== See also ==
- History of the Jews in Arizona
- Tucson Hebrew Academy
