= Yekum Purkan =

Aramaic prayers for Sabbath service

Yekum Purkan (Jewish Babylonian Aramaic: יְקוּם פֻּרְקָן, lit. “may deliverance arise” or “may salvation arise”), is the name of two Aramaic prayers recited in the Ashkenazi Jewish liturgy immediately after the public reading of the Torah and the Prophets during the Sabbath morning service. The first prayer is for the welfare of Torah student and teachers, judges and leaders; the second is recited for the well-being of all the members of the congregation. A third prayer, in Hebrew, Mi Sheberakh (“May He Who blessed”) is also recited together with Yekum Purkan and asks for God's blessings on those who provide funds for the community's needs.

== History ==
The two Yekum Purkan prayers were composed in Babylonia and are written in Aramaic, where Aramaic had been the daily language of the Jews for more than a thousand years until Arabic became the vernacular in the ninth century. The prayers do not appear in writing in the manuscript prayer books of the Babylonian geonim, Rabbi Amram Gaon (died 875) and Rabbi Saadiah Gaon (died 942), thus indicating a composition date towards the end of the Geonic period.

The first of the two prayers was composed in the tenth or eleventh century, when the Talmudic Academies in Babylonia were weakening and scholars in Europe were increasingly assuming Jewish religious leadership. The diminishing status of the academies led to a decrease in their revenues, and it was against this backdrop that Yekum Purkan was composed on behalf of the students and teachers of the academies, and their leaders – the geonim and the titular Head of the Diaspora known as the Resh Galuta or Exilarch. Thus, in addition to asking for God's help, the prayer also aimed to motivate people to give generously to support the academies of learning, and so were composed in the Aramaic vernacular rather than Hebrew and recited at Sabbath morning services when the largest number of congregants could be expected to be present.

The earliest written record of the first Yekum Purkan prayer is found in the Maḥzor Vitry manuscript of Simhah ben Shmuel of Vitry, who died 1105 in France. Only this first prayer was recited in the French rite. The earliest written record of the second prayer appears in the work known as Sefer HaRoke’ach by Eleazar ben Yehudah of Worms (c. 1176–1238). Neither prayer is found in the Sephardi liturgy, but a similar, although more lengthy prayer, called “Tefillah L’ma’an Ha’kahal” (Prayer for the Congregation) is found in some Yemenite prayer book manuscripts. Furthermore, some claim that it was recited in the Sephardic liturgy until the abolishment of the establishment of the Geonim, at which point it was deemed to be irrelevant.

Yekum Purkan, and the Mi Sheberakh prayer that follows it, are among the earliest known recitations of personalized blessings in the Jewish liturgy, whose typical usage until then was standardized prayers using set Hebrew phrases, recited on behalf of the entire community, without specifying the roles or identities of the worshippers.

== Content ==
Both prayers are very similar in form and derive their name from their opening words, yekum purkan, meaning “may deliverance arise” or “may salvation arise.”

The first is a prayer for the welfare of the Torah scholars in the Land of Israel and Babylonia, their teachers, the exilarch, and the judges. Many of the phrases of this prayer resemble those of the Kaddish de-Rabbanan ("the scholars' Kaddish"). It invokes God's blessings on the “heads of the academies” (the geonim), the “head of the Diaspora” (the exilarch) and the “judges at the gates” and requests divine favor for those who uphold Torah – by teaching, study, support and especially by undertaking the responsibilities of communal leadership.

The second Yekum Purkan prayer is phrased similarly to the first and is a more general prayer for the welfare of the congregation; it requests God's blessing for all the members of the congregation and their families “wives, sons and daughters and all that is theirs.”

== Place in the liturgy ==
In the Ashkenazi ritual, the two Yekum Purkan prayers are recited on Sabbath morning, following the public reading of the Torah and the haftarah. In many orthodox congregations, it has in recent years become the custom that the Rabbi gives his sermon immediately after the haftarah and before the recitation of Yekum Purkan (rather than the more common practice of the sermon being given after the Torah scroll is returned to the Aron HaKodesh). The Rabbi's sermon at this juncture mimics the order that was used during the period of the gaonim when this was said after the address of the Reish Galuta.

These prayers are recited on every Sabbath of the year, including festival days that occur on the Sabbath. However, they are not recited on festival weekdays, when instead, the service continues with Yah Eli in some customs, followed by Ashrei, or (in most communities) Yizkor on the final days of the festivals of Passover, Shavuot and Shmini Atzeret.

One reason given for Yekum Purkan not being recited on a weekday holiday is so as to end the lengthy holiday services somewhat earlier so that people can leave to prepare their holiday meal (on the Sabbath, meals are prepared before the Sabbath). Another reason suggested is that it was decided that the prayer for the support of Torah study was most appropriate for the Sabbath day, as the day on which the Torah was traditionally believed to have been given on Mount Sinai.

As the prayer concerns those who teach, learn and provide leadership and material support to maintain Torah study, the placement of the Yekum Purkan prayer in the order of the service is immediately following the readings from the Torah and Prophets. During the period of the gaonim the resh galuta would give his address after the reading of the Torah, then a representative of the congregation would bless him, and then he would bless the congregation.

Following the two paragraphs of Yekum Purkan, an additional prayer, the Mi Sheberakh (May He Who blessed our forefathers, Abraham, Isaac and Jacob), is recited in honor of all those who volunteer for the benefit of the community and calls for God's blessings on those individuals who provide funds for the general welfare. It calls for special blessings to those who “give candles for illumination and wine for Kiddush and Havdalah, bread for guests and charity to the poor; and all who involve themselves faithfully with the needs of the community.” Mi Sheberakh is written in Hebrew but is read in the vernacular in some congregations because it clearly articulates the financial and moral responsibilities of the audience. In the Western Ashkenaic rite, this third prayer is omitted on Shabbat Mevorkhim.

Even though the academies of Babylonia and positions referred to in the first Yekum Purkan no longer exist and Aramaic is no longer a spoken language of the Jews, this prayer has remained part of the Sabbath liturgy in Ashkenazic communities. In modern times, some communities have added the phrase “and all that are in the lands of our dispersion” to make the prayer more relevant to them while others interpret the term “Babylonia” – when used together in distinction to the term “Land of Israel” – to apply to all the lands outside of the Land of Israel in which Jews were dispersed.

According to the Orthodox practice, a person who is praying alone does not say the second Yekum Purkan, as it is recited on behalf of the congregation, which is not present when one prays alone. Some halachic authorities rule that both paragraphs of Yekum Purkan should be omitted by someone who prays alone.
