= Junior Young Friends =

Junior Young Friends (JYF) was a Quaker youth group within Britain Yearly Meeting for 13- to 18-year-olds, which held weekend-long gatherings roughly 3 times a year.

Events took place in a Quaker Meeting House, usually in the Birmingham area. It was, strictly speaking, responsible to Warwickshire Monthly Meeting, although Central England Quakers eventually took over the role. However, it attracted participants from across the United Kingdom, especially for the Bournville Christmas event.

The appendage of the word 'Junior' to the name was in order to distinguish from Young Friends usually used to describe Quakers aged 18–30 (as in Young Friends General Meeting).

The weekends sometimes had a theme, often related to Quaker ideals, which was contemplated through Base Group discussions, the Committee-run sessions and sometimes guest speakers. There was also a significant amount of free time allocated to allow participants to explore the city where the event was held. The tradition of staying up into the early hours of the morning, or not even sleeping at all, was embraced by most participants. JYF has evolved a number of in-jokes and other traditions including the love of beans and the celebration of "Pi time," by eating a type of pie such as a mince pie at 3:14am. These traditions often appear quite odd to those who have little experience of the young Quaker culture.

There are also a number of JYF groups worldwide.

== History ==
Historically, there were JYF groups throughout Britain, but a number of circumstances led to their closure, to the point that the Warwickshire Junior Young Friends was the last surviving one. Many Quaker youth groups are now known as Link Groups, but differ from Junior Young Friends because they are organised partly or in whole by adults. JYF was solely organised by The Committee who were all 19 or under. To fulfil legal requirements, there were Responsible Adult supervisors (RA's) on site throughout the weekend.

== Closure ==
After several years of dwindling numbers and COVID struggles, the event was reduced to merely the Bournville one at Christmas. Shortly after, Central England Quakers decided to cut off support for the event, citing increasing safeguarding regulations, lack of committee members within the age range and a general lack of interest in running the event. The final JYF was held at Bournville Meeting House from the 17–19 December 2021. It was run as a celebration of JYF's recent history, and unusually had a changed age range of 18-25 as there weren't enough adult volunteers to safeguard under 18s.

JYFs closure marked the end of Junior Young Friends events in Britain. Rosie and Sammy Gilbert, the main organisers for the last few years, have expressed interest in restarting the event following the easing of lockdown rules. Along with a skeleton crew of former JYF committee members, they have set up a successor event called Fellowship of the Friends (pronounced F-OFF) targeting the 18-25 year-old age range.
