= Congregation Or Chadash =

Reform synagogue in Chicago, Illinois, US

- Hebrew: אוֹר חָדָשׁ
- Location in Chicago

Religion
- Affiliation: Reform Judaism (former)
- Ecclesiastical or organisational status: Synagogue (1975 – 2016)
- Status: Closed; merged with Am Keshet LGBT group at Temple Sholom

Architecture
- Established: 1975 (as a congregation)

Congregation Or Chadash (Hebrew: אוֹר חָדָשׁ, lit. 'New Light') was a Reform Jewish LGBT-oriented congregation that was located at 5959 North Sheridan Road, Edgewater, Chicago, Illinois, in the United States.

The congregation was founded in 1975 as a gay support group for Jews, and was holding religious services by 1976. In 1977 it moved into its first building, a former Unitarian church on West Barry Avenue, and hired its first permanent rabbi, Suzanne Griffel, in 1997.

Griffel was succeeded as rabbi by Larry Edwards, and Or Chadash moved a new location, which shared with another synagogue and a Jewish day school, in 2003. In October 2010, Or Chadash was thought to be one of the two synagogues targeted in the 2010 cargo planes bomb plot.

In 2016, Or Chadash merged into another Reform congregation, Temple Sholom, with Or Chadash remaining the name of the Temple's LGBTQ+ community group.

== Early history ==
Or Chadash was founded in Chicago in 1975 as a gay support group for Jews. The organization was initially called simply "The Jewish Group". It held its first religious services in January 1976, and adopted its current name in April of that year. The congregation remains geared to needs of LGBT Jews.

According to J. Gordon Melton, at the time of its founding there were four other gay synagogues in the United States, in Manhattan, Miami, Los Angeles and Berkeley, California. Or Chadash and the other gay congregations faced significant opposition from others in the Jewish community, which had, Melton writes, "traditionally abhorred homosexuality because of the admonition to be fruitful and multiply (Gen. 1:28), and the unequivocal denunciation of homosexuality in the Torah (Lev. 20:13)".

== Rabbis ==
Originally established as a member-led congregation, Or Chadash briefly had a rabbi for a few months in the 1980s. The rabbi had asked if he could temporarily lead the group, but was not replaced after he left. In 1997, the congregation hired its first permanent rabbi, the 35-year-old Suzanne Griffel. She had previously been director and rabbi of a Hillel branch at the University of Chicago. It was the first time a Chicago gay/lesbian synagogue had hired a rabbi, and the first time any American mostly gay synagogue had hired a rabbi who did not identify as LGBT. At the time, the synagogue had 120 members.

Griffel was succeeded as rabbi of Or Chadash by Laurence "Larry" Edwards, who was ordained at Hebrew Union College-Jewish Institute of Religion in New York. Prior to joining Congregation Or Chadash, Edwards served for 22 years as a director of Hillel branches at Dartmouth College and Cornell University.

== Buildings ==
In 1977, the congregation moved into the Second Unitarian Church building at 656 West Barry Avenue, from which it operated for over two decades. The congregation moved in 2003 to 5959 North Sheridan Road, a building which it shares with another synagogue, the Emanuel Congregation, and Chicago Jewish Day School, a school for children from kindergarten through 8th grade.

== Events since 2005 ==
Or Chadash was inducted into the Chicago Gay and Lesbian Hall of Fame in 2006.

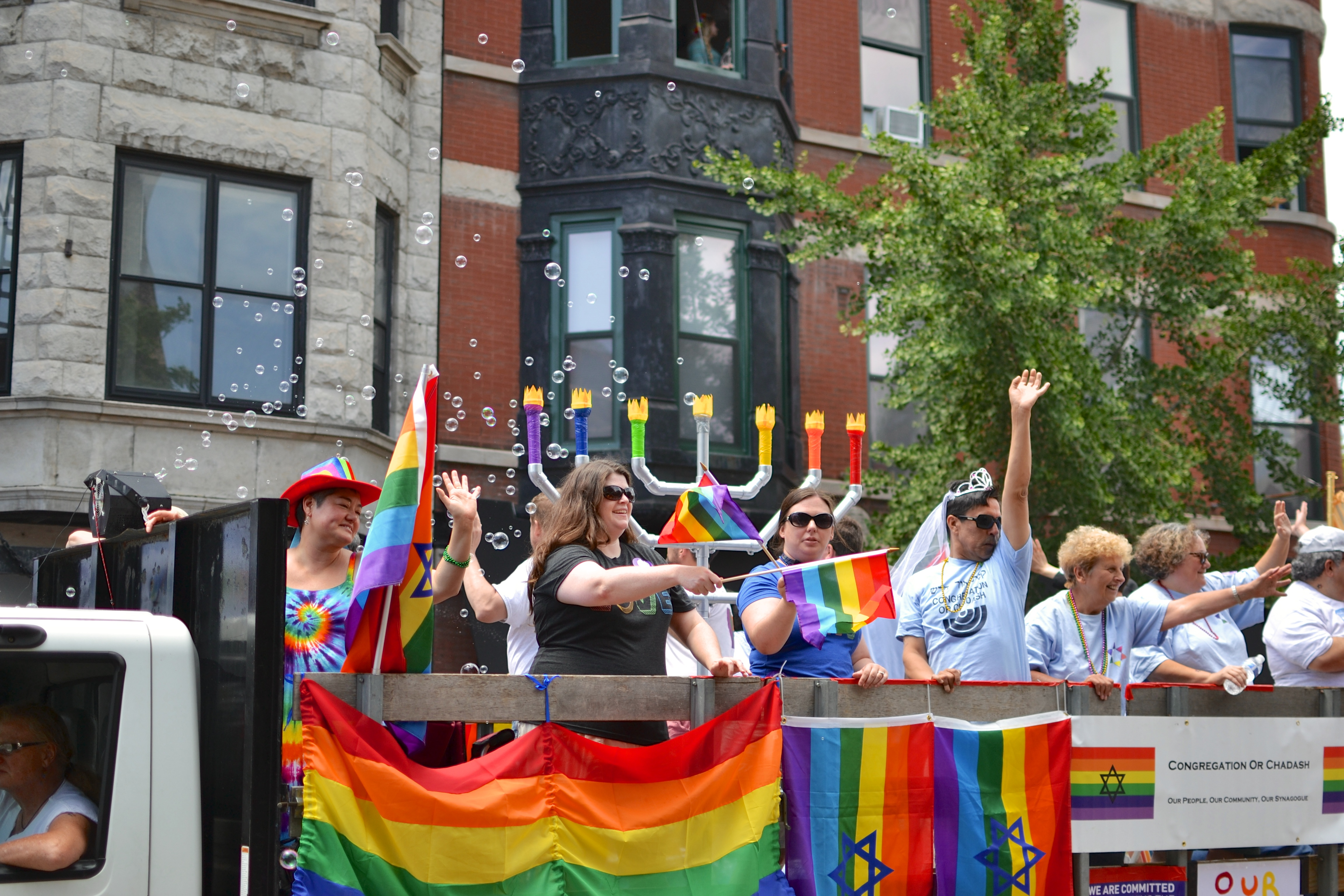
A float by the congregation in the 2013 Chicago Pride Parade.

On October 10, 2010, Or Chadash was notified that its synagogue was one of the addresses on the packages in the 2010 cargo plane bomb plot. Rabbi Edwards said "We're rather puzzled at how a little congregation like ours would get on the radar as a target for somebody". Because Or Chada is so small, Edwards surmised that it had been targeted at random, or because it is mostly gay. The website of Emanuel Congregation, which shares space with Congregation Or Chadash, was recently visited 83 times in one day by someone in Egypt, according to Emanuel's website administrator. However, intelligence officials are reported to believe that the synagogues were not actual targets and that the bombs were intended to detonate while still on board airplanes. According to CNN.com, on November 3, Or Chadash co-president Lilli Kornblum "said that despite earlier reports, an FBI agent informed her that her synagogue was not one of the intended destinations in the foiled bomb plot that originated in Yemen."

Later reports indicated that one of the bombs had been addressed to Or Chadash's former location on West Barry, and the other to an inactive Orthodox synagogue, also in Chicago. Investigators believed that the bombers "...used an outdated directory of Chicago Jewish institutions that is still available on the Internet." Robert Pape, a University of Chicago professor who has studied terrorist groups, believed that the synagogues were a backup plan, had the bombs not detonated mid-flight. The packages would have been delivered on the Jewish Sabbath.

Or Chadash was affiliated with the Union for Reform Judaism and the World Congress of Gay, Lesbian, Bisexual, and Transgender Jews.

== Merger ==
By mid-2016, Or Chadash membership had declined to about 60 members "basically because we got what we wanted. … There's no longer a need for a separate congregation," Or Chadash co-president Lilli Kornblum told a local newspaper. On June 24, 2016, Or Chadash held its final service as an independent congregation, and after considering a merger with three Chicago Reform institutions, merged with the Am Keshet LGBT group at Temple Sholom in Chicago.
