= History of the Jews in Arizona =

Anti-Semitism and discrimination against Jews in Arizona

Jewish people have been living in Arizona since the mid-1870s. In 1877, there were 48 Jews living in the Arizona territory. Over succeeding decades, Arizona's Jewish population rose to 2,000 in 1897 and fell to 500 in 1907. By 1973, it had risen again to over 21,000. The Jewish population grew rapidly after World War II. As of 2023, there are over 82,000 Jewish residents in Arizona.

Jews and Christians had good relations in pioneer Arizona; many well-known firms had Jewish and Christian partners. Many Jews served in territorial and state legislatures. Jacob Weinberger was on the Arizona Supreme Court. There have been several Jewish mayors of Phoenix and Tucson in recent years.

The first synagogue built in Phoenix, was Temple Beth Israel. At the time that this synagogue was originally built, there were approximately 120 Jews living in the Phoenix area. Rabbi Albert Plotkin led Temple Beth Israel for nearly four decades, from 1955 until his retirement in 1992, becoming a prominent figure in Phoenix's interfaith and civil-rights communities. After its move to Scottsdale, AZ other congregations emerged across the valley in Mesa, Tempe, Glendale, Paradise Valley, and other locations. Organized Jewish congregations were also found in Flagstaff, Kingman, Mesa, Prescott, Scottsdale and Tucson.

Despite the success of early and mid-Jewish leaders in the territory and state, Jews living in Arizona have still faced challenges observing Judaism and facing anti-Semitism. While Jews around the world fell victim to Hitler's Nazi movement from the mid-1930s onwards, Jews in Arizona experienced their own form of anti-Semitism leading up to the 1960s. This mainly included being restricted from specific resorts.

== Organizations ==
- Jewish Community Foundation of Southern Arizona
- Jewish Federation of Southern Arizona
- Valley of the Sun Jewish Community Center
- Jewish Community Relations Council and Holocaust Education
- Jewish Family & Children's Services of Southern Arizona
- Jewish War Veterans of the USA Friedman-Paul Post
- Tucson Jewish Community Center
- American Jewish Committee
- Anti-Defamation League
- Brandeis National Committee- Phoenix Chapter
- Hadassah
- Jewish Community Foundation of Greater Phoenix
- Jewish Community Services
- Yeshiva of Phoenix
- East Valley JCC (EVJCC)
- ADL Arizona - Anti-Defamation League
- Jewish Philanthropies of Southern Arizona
