= North West Surrey Synagogue =

Reform synagogue in Surrey, England

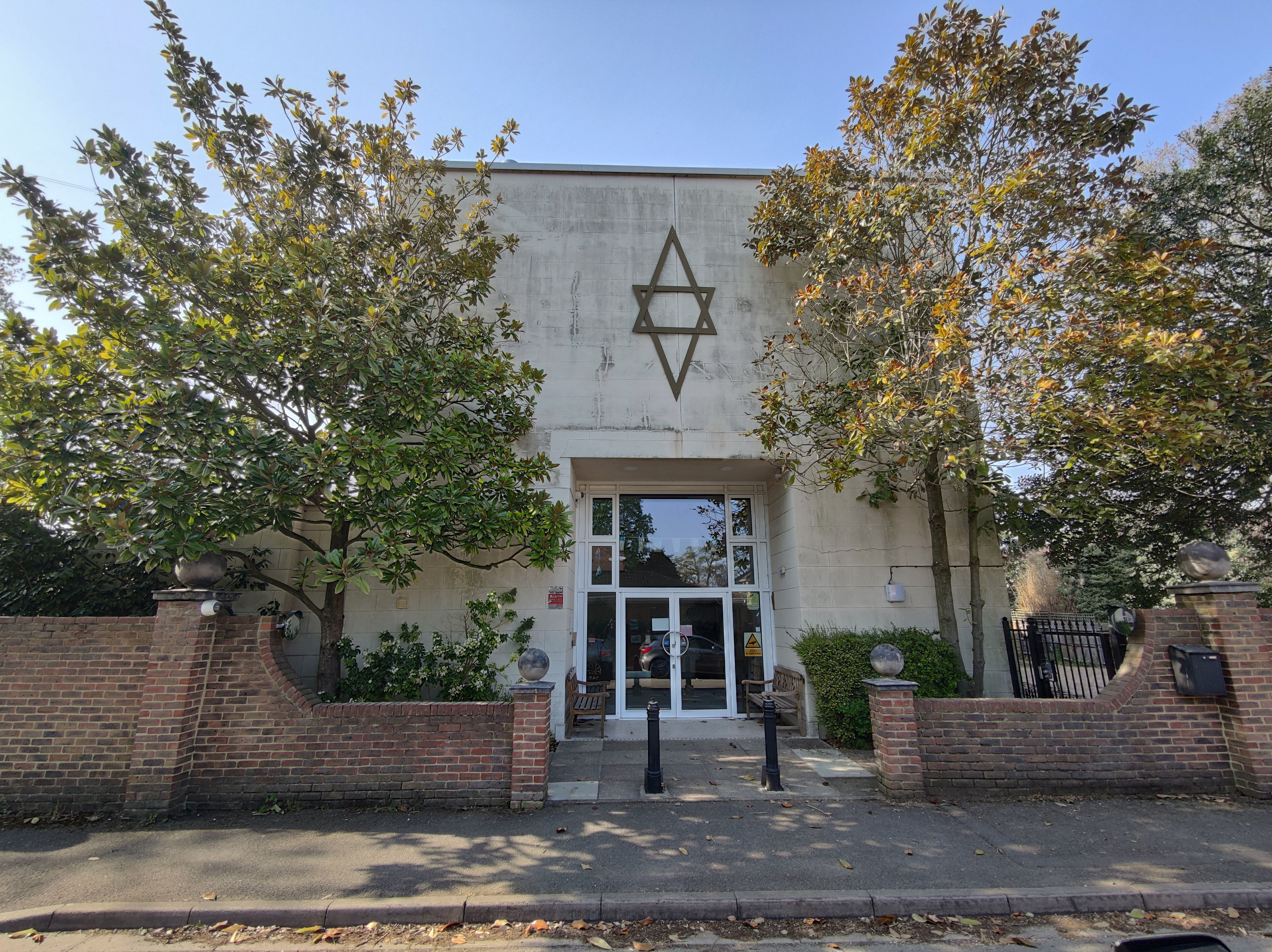
- The synagogue in 2020

- Location of the synagogue in Surrey

Religion
- Affiliation: Progressive Judaism
- Rite: Reform Judaism
- Ecclesiastical or organizational status: Synagogue
- Leadership: Rabbi Drorah Setel
- Status: Active

Location
- Location: Horvath Close, Oatlands Drive, Weybridge, Surrey, England KT13 9QZ
- Country: United Kingdom
- Interactive map of North West Surrey Synagogue
- Coordinates: 51°22′21″N 0°26′18″W

Architecture
- Established: 1968 (as a congregation)
- Completed: c. 1987

Website
- nwss.org.uk

The North West Surrey Synagogue is a Reform Jewish congregation and synagogue, located on Oatlands Drive in Weybridge, Surrey, England, in the United Kingdom. The community was founded in 1968, and was a member of the Movement for Reform Judaism. The synagogue is now a founding constituent member of Progressive Judaism.

In January 2018, the congregation consisted of around 300 families.

The synagogue's rabbi is Drorah Setel, appointed 2026. Its previous rabbis have included Tony Bayfield (1969–1982), Frederick Morgan (1984–1997), Jackie Tabick (1999–2013), Dr David Zucker (2013–2017) and Kath Vardi.

== See also ==
Logo of the congregation

- History of the Jews in England
- List of Jewish communities in the United Kingdom
- List of synagogues in the United Kingdom
