= Yoel Kahn (Reform rabbi) =

American rabbi and scholar (born 1958)

Yoel H. Kahn
- Born: 1958 (age 67–68); San Jose, California, US
- Education: University of California, Berkeley; Hebrew Union College-Jewish Institute of Religion; Graduate Theological Union
- Occupation: Rabbi
- Spouse: Dan Bellm
- Children: 1

Yoel H. Kahn (born 1958) is an American rabbi. As the first full-time rabbi of the LGBTQ synagogue Sha’ar Zahav in San Francisco, he played a key role in shaping the Jewish response to the AIDS crisis and advancing LGBTQ inclusion within the Reform movement.

== Early life and education ==
Kahn was born in 1958 and reared in San Jose, California, United States. His father was a science professor at San Jose State College and his mother a psychotherapist and teacher of yiddish. He graduated Phi Beta Kappa from the University of California, Berkeley with a degree in Hebrew languages and was ordained by Hebrew Union College in 1985. In 1999, he earned a doctorate from the Graduate Theological Union.

== Career ==
Kahn was hired in 1985 to be the first full-time rabbi of Congregation Sha’ar Zahav, an LGBT synagogue where members were dying of AIDS. Nothing in his training had prepared him for the overwhelming loss he witnessed as so many in his community died young. Kahn helped to modify the community’s Mi Shebeirach healing prayer, written by Sha’ar Zahav member Garry Koenigsburg specifically for Friday night services, de-coupling it from its traditional place in the Saturday morning service. He wrote an English “Prayer for Healing” which was added to the Sha’ar Zaav siddur along with the modified Mi Shebeirach prayer. It called upon the Source of Mercy to share peace that night with the individuals named, with all who were ill, and with those who loved them, watching with special care over those living with AIDS and related illnesses. When the time came to name individuals, Kahn would look out over the congregation, slowly meeting the eyes of those gathered as he extended his arm and open hand, inviting them to speak aloud or hold silently in their hearts the names of those in need of healing.

Kahn served on the Central Conference of American Rabbis (CCAR) committee studying the question of allowing openly gay rabbis to serve congregations in the Reform movement (1986-1989). There had been fear that allowing ordination of homosexuals would create tensions with Conservative and Orthodox branches of Judaism. At the time Kahn’s synagogue had 400 members and 50 children with 15 students in the religious school. In 1990, the panel recommended no restrictions be imposed on qualified gay and lesbian Jews who want to become rabbis.

At the 1996 Central Conference of American Rabbis meeting in Philadelphia, Kahn held up a photograph of his partner and their adopted four-year-old son to draw attention to the inequities faced by same-sex couples, who were denied healthcare coverage and other benefits available to married heterosexual couples. While the assembled Reform rabbis voted in favor of endorsing the legalization of same-sex civil marriage, they deferred discussion of religious marriage ceremonies.

In 1995 Kahn left Sha’ar Zahav to become the director of Jewish Life at Stanford University. He was also a rabbi at the Jewish Community Center of San Francisco before becoming the senior rabbi of Congregation Beth El in Berkeley, California in 2007, where he served until retiring in 2021.

== Publications (selected) ==
- Kahn, Yoel H. (2011). The Three Blessings: Boundaries, Censorship, and Identity in Jewish Liturgy. Oxford University Press. ISBN 978-0-19-989329-4.
- Kahn, Yoel H. (2009). "And Jacob Came Out | Parashat Vayetzei (Genesis 28:10-32:3)". In Drinkwater, Gregg; Lesser, Joshua; Schneer, David (eds.). Torah Queries: Weekly Commentaries on the Hebrew Bible. Judith Plaskow (foreword). New York University Press. pp. 43–46. ISBN 978-0-8147-2012-7.
- Rabbi Yoel H. Kahn, PhD (Winter 2025). "The CCAR AD Hoc Committee on Homosexuality and the Rabbinate, 1985-1990". CCAR Journal | The Reform Jewish Quarterly: 5–13.

== Personal life ==
Kahn is married to poet Dan Bellm and they have one son.
