= Beth Chayim Chadashim =

Synagogue in Los Angeles, California

- Hebrew: בית חיים חדשים
- Location in Mid-City Los Angeles

Religion
- Affiliation: Reform Judaism
- Ecclesiastical or organisational status: Synagogue
- Leadership: Rabbi Jillian R. Cameron
- Status: Active

Location
- Location: 6090 West Pico Boulevard, Mid-City Los Angeles, California
- Country: United States
- Coordinates: 34°03′09″N 118°22′22″W

Architecture
- Type: Synagogue
- Established: 1972 (as a congregation)
- Completed: 1977

Website
- bcc-la.org

Beth Chayim Chadashim (Hebrew: בית חיים חדשים, lit. 'House of New Life'), abbreviated as BCC, is a Reform Jewish synagogue located at 6090 West Pico Boulevard, in Mid-City Los Angeles, California, in the United States.

The congregation was founded in 1972, primarily for lesbian and gay Jews. The Los Angeles Conservancy acknowledges the congregation as being "culturally significant" as both the first LGBT synagogue in the world, the first LGBT synagogue recognized by the Union for Reform Judaism and, in 1977, as the first LGBT synagogue to own its own building.

== History ==
On April 4, 1972, Selma Kay, Jerry Gordon, Jerry Small, and Bob Zalkin were the only people who came to a weekly Wednesday night meeting at Los Angeles's Metropolitan Community Church. They were all Jewish, and Selma asked, "Why don't we form a temple with an outreach to the gay Jews?" The others agreed, and Rev. Troy Perry offered them the use of the church's facilities free of charge. About a dozen women and men responded to the call to an ad hoc committee meeting to discuss the temple's founding, and the first service was held June 9, 1972 in Jerry Gordon's home. In July 1972, an interfaith service was held at MCC's sanctuary, to introduce the new temple to the gay and lesbian community. Weekly Friday night Jewish services were then held at MCC. The congregation was known as the Metropolitan Community Temple for its first eight months, before later taking the name Beth Chayim Chadashim 'House of New Life', in reference to the MCC's newsletter, New Life.

In 1973, BCC received a Torah scroll from the town of Chotěboř (in the former Czechoslovakia), on permanent loan from Westminster Synagogue in London. The synagogue was welcomed into the Reform movement the same year.

After several temporary locations, in 1977 the BCC congregation purchased a storefront at 6000 West Pico Boulevard in West Los Angeles (the Pico-Robertson area) that was transformed into a synagogue and Jewish life-cycle space. The membership grew and flourished for over 30 years at this location. In 1978, the synagogue began to publish a newsletter titled G'vanim.

In 1997, the congregation celebrated its 25th anniversary. At that time, it had 250 members (not including children) with 90% of them being LGBT and its oldest member being 87 years old.

Janet Marder was the congregation's first rabbi. Lisa Ann Edwards later served as a student rabbi under their first full-time rabbi, Denise Eger. From 1992 to 2007, Cantorial Soloist Fran Magid Chalin's unique use of music and energy served to unite, uplift, inspire, and prompt BCC's connection to Jewish tradition, especially for the growing number of BCC children. In 1994 Rabbi Lisa Ann Edwards was ordained and became BCC's rabbi. After a 25-year tenure, Rabbi Lisa Edwards retired in 2019. Rabbi Jillian R. Cameron became BCC's rabbi in 2020.

In 2006, Ohr Chayim (Light of Life) was initiated as BCC's Family Education Program for children and their families, under Leah Zimmerman, the first Director of Education. Cantor Juval Porat, the first cantor to be trained in post-Holocaust Germany, was installed as BCC's Cantor in 2010.

After five years of planning, BCC moved a block away from its first home to 6090 West Pico Boulevard, to accommodate BCC's expanding membership, staff and Jewish glbt studies programming. This endeavor of renovating three 1931 store fronts was led by BCC's first Executive Director Felicia Park-Rogers (hired in 2005) and BCC Member, Architect Ira Dankberg, and was designed by Toni Lewis and Marc Schoeplein of Lewis|Schoeplein architects. 6090 West Pico Boulevard is the first LEED certified synagogue in the United States.

The current clergy are Rabbi Jillian Cameron and Cantor Juval Porat. It has an inclusive and progressive stance and programming towards gender and sexuality.
