= Native Woodland Survey of Scotland =

Scottish woodland survey

- Start date: November 2006
- End date: December 2013
- Location: Scotland
- Method: Desk-based Geographic Information System analysis checked by follow-up walk through survey
- forestry.gov.scot/forests-environment/biodiversity/native-woodlands/native-woodland-survey-of-scotland-nwss

The Native Woodland Survey of Scotland (NWSS) has been developed by the Forestry Commission Scotland (FCS) to collect information that enables future monitoring of the extent and condition of the total Scottish native woodland resource and supports policy development. Field work started in 2006 and when completed by 2013 it will be the most comprehensive survey of its kind undertaken to date.

== Survey aims ==
The aim of the Native Woodland Survey of Scotland is to identify all native, nearly native and plantation on ancient woodland sites (PAWS), woodlands of at least 0.5ha in order to create a woodland map linked to a spatial dataset showing the type, extent, composition and condition of these woods. PAWS are also surveyed, even where they are not mainly native in species composition in order to provide information to help maintain or restore their remaining biodiversity value.

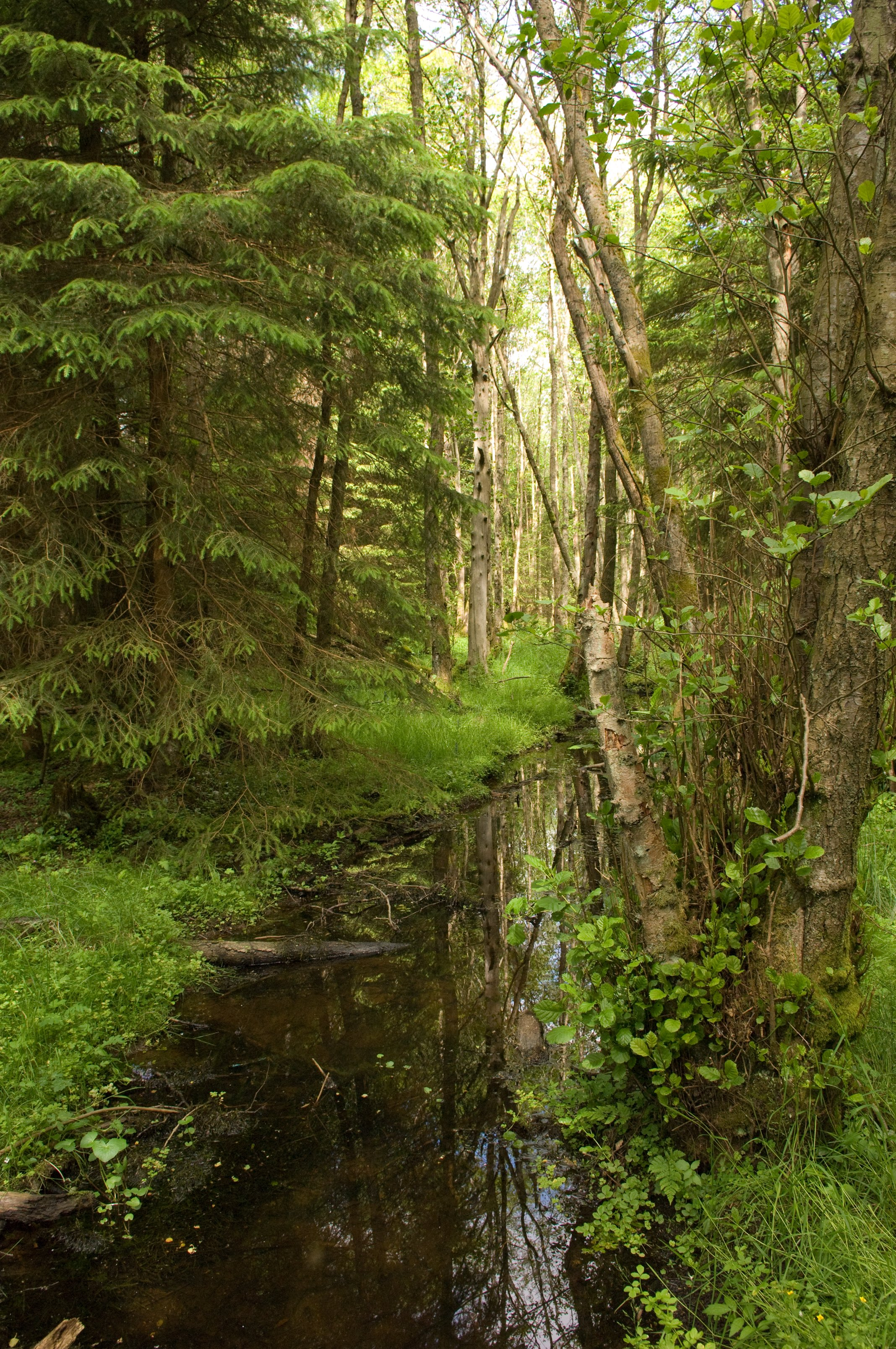
Wet woodland joining a conifer plantation

== Survey process ==
The field surveyors do a walk-through survey of every "candidate" woodland. The surveyors follow the procedures laid out in a detailed protocol and record a range of attributes to describe and record the woodland and their boundaries.

== Results ==
Summaries of the key results will be published for each local authority area in Scotland, in a series of reports on the NWSS web-pages on the Forestry Commission Scotland website. These will be followed by a national summary report. The spatial dataset can be looked at through FCS Map Viewer and Data Download site. Guidance notes are available on the NWSS web-pages to help users interpret the data and consider further uses and analyses.

A copy of the survey plan, process, procedures and a full list of the features assessed can be found at NWSS home website.
