= Les Eldering =

Australian rules footballer

Personal information
- Full name: Les Eldering
- Born: 18 January 1938
- Died: 26 January 2003 (aged 65)
- Original team: Commonwealth Bank
- Height: 196 cm (6 ft 5 in)
- Weight: 89 kg (196 lb)

Playing career^{1}
Years	Club	Games (Goals)
1958-59	Commonwealth Bank	83 (70)
1960	St Kilda	8 (7)
- ^{1} Playing statistics correct to the end of 1960.

Career highlights
- 1958-59 : Best & Fairest (seniors)

Les Eldering (18 January 1938 – 26 January 2003) was an Australian rules footballer who played with St Kilda in the Victorian Football League (VFL).

Eldering played his early football at amateur club Commonwealth Bank and represented the Australian Amateurs at the 1958 Melbourne Carnival. In the 1960 VFL season, Eldering made eight appearances for St Kilda, as a ruckman. He injured his knee in a 1961 practice match when he landed on a sprinkler hole and wouldn't play again for St Kilda.
