= Albert Plotkin =

American Reform Judaism Rabbi (1920–2010)

- Born: September 9, 1920; South Bend, Indiana, U.S.
- Died: February 3, 2010 (aged 89); Phoenix, Arizona, U.S.
- Occupation: Reform rabbi
- Notable work: Rabbi Plotkin: A Memoir (1992)
- Spouse: Sylvia Pincus (m. 1949)
- Children: Janis Plotkin, Debra Plotkin
- Parent(s): Samuel and Sophie (Novak) Plotkin

Albert Plotkin (1920 – 2010) was an American Reform Rabbi and Jewish spiritual leader and educator in Arizona. He served as rabbi of Temple Beth Israel, the first permanent Jewish congregation in Phoenix for almost forty years. The temple later became the Cutler-Plotkin Jewish Heritage Center, partly named in his honor.

== Early life and education ==
Plotkin was born in South Bend, Indiana, to parents who had immigrated from Russia. As a young man he was a talented singer, and before college he was offered a job with a Major Bowes talent show in New York City, but he chose to pursue higher education. He earned his undergraduate degree from the University of Notre Dame in 1942 and, in 1948, was ordained by Hebrew Union College with a Master of Hebrew Letters. He later received a doctorate from the college in 1967.

He was the first known Notre Dame graduate to become a rabbi, and would later say these experiences gave him a "realization of the bridge between Judaism and Christianity".

Plotkin first served as an assistant rabbi at Temple De Hirsch in Seattle, where he met Sylvia Pincus, a member of the congregation and his future wife. They married in 1949, and Plotkin became senior rabbi of Temple Emanu-El in Spokane. The couple had two daughters.

== Career ==
=== Temple Beth Israel, Phoenix ===
Plotkin moved his family to Phoenix in 1955 to lead Temple Beth Israel. At the time, Phoenix had about 3,000 Jewish residents and the congregation some 350 families. He served the congregation for nearly four decades, retiring in 1992 after a 44-year rabbinic career and becoming rabbi emeritus. He was succeeded by Rabbi Kenneth Segel. A committed Zionist during his student years at Hebrew Union College, when the movement was unpopular there, he remained a strong supporter of Israel.

=== Civil rights and interfaith work ===
Plotkin was active in both the Jewish and wider communities of Phoenix and championed the civil rights movement and ecumenical cooperation. In 1972, the National Conference of Christians and Jews presented him with its National Award for Brotherhood. In 1998, he delivered the "El Maaleh Rachamim" prayer at the nationally televised funeral of Senator Barry Goldwater.

=== Communal and academic leadership ===
Plotkin held several national offices in Reform Judaism. He served as president of the Pacific Association of Reform Rabbis from 1967 to 1968, on the board of Hebrew Union College from 1968 to 1970, as secretary of the Central Conference of American Rabbis from 1969 to 1971, and on the board of the United Jewish Appeal of New York from 1974 to 1977. He helped establish the Jewish Studies Program at Arizona State University, where he taught, and volunteered for about 25 years as a chaplain at the Phoenix Veterans Hospital.

=== Later years ===
Plotkin served on the board of Arizona Opera from 1986 to 1988 and sang with the company in 1994.

He was also the founding rabbi of the Jewish Community of Sedona and the Verde Valley, serving from 1991 until the congregation hired a full-time rabbi in 2005. The congregation's synagogue, dedicated in 2004, includes the Rabbi Albert and Sylvia Plotkin Sanctuary, named in their honor.
