= Congregation Beth Israel (Scottsdale, Arizona) =

Reform Jewish synagogue in Scottsdale, Arizona, US

- Hebrew: בית ישראל
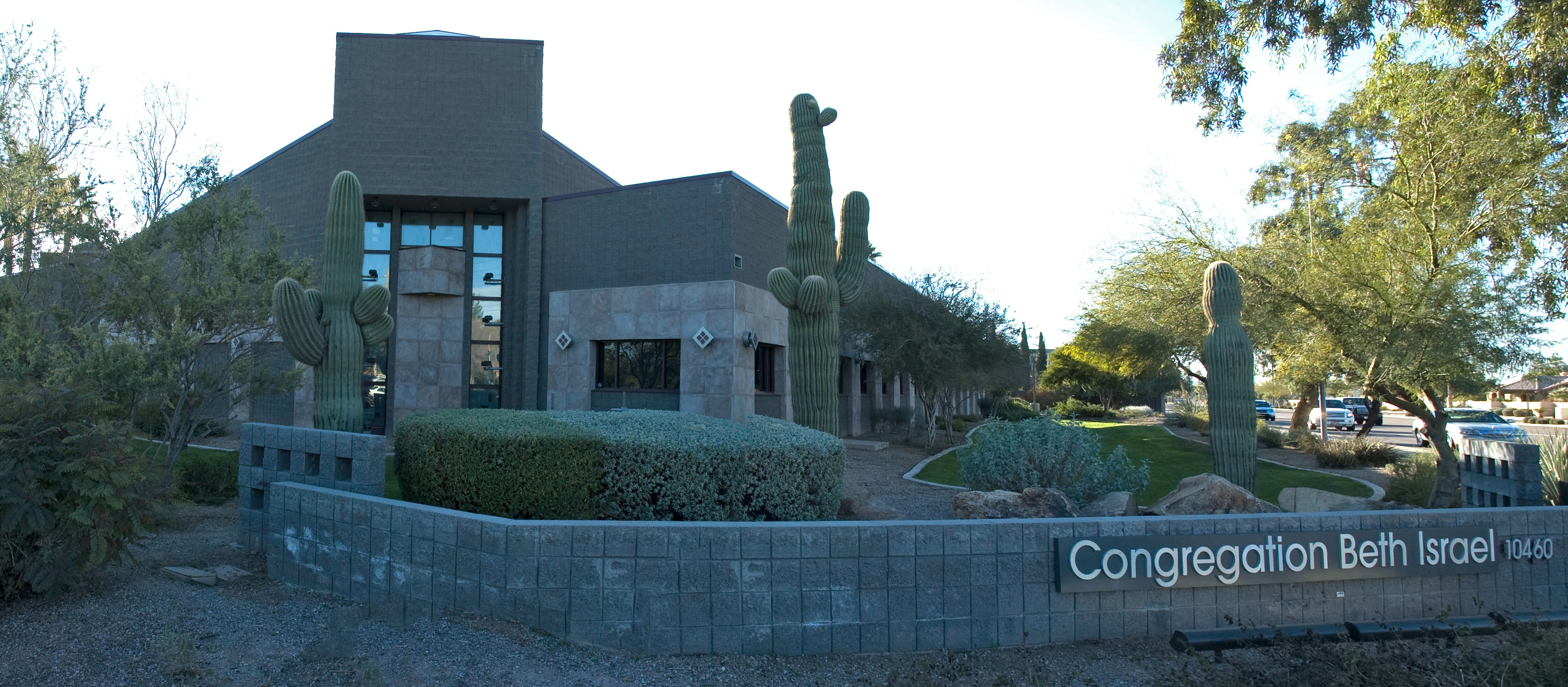
- Beth Israel synagogue, in 2009

- Location in Arizona

Religion
- Affiliation: Reform Judaism
- Ecclesiastical or organizational status: Synagogue
- Leadership: Rabbi Stephen Kahn; Rabbi Sara Mason-Barkin (Associate)
- Status: Active

Location
- Location: 10460 North 56th Street, Scottsdale, Arizona
- Country: United States
- Interactive map of Congregation Beth Israel
- Administration: Union for Reform Judaism
- Coordinates: 33°43′53″N 111°57′38″W

Architecture
- Architect: Lescher, Kibbey, and Mahoney (1922)
- Type: Synagogue architecture
- Style: Mission Revival (1922)
- Established: 1920 (as a congregation)
- Completed: 1922 (Downtown Phoenix) 1949 (Eleventh and Flower); 1997 (Scottsdale)
- Capacity: Main sanctuary: 450; Chapel: 200

Website
- cbiaz.org
- Temple Beth Israel (1922)
- U.S. National Register of Historic Places
- Cutler-Plotkin Jewish Heritage Center
- Phoenix Historic Property Register No. 197
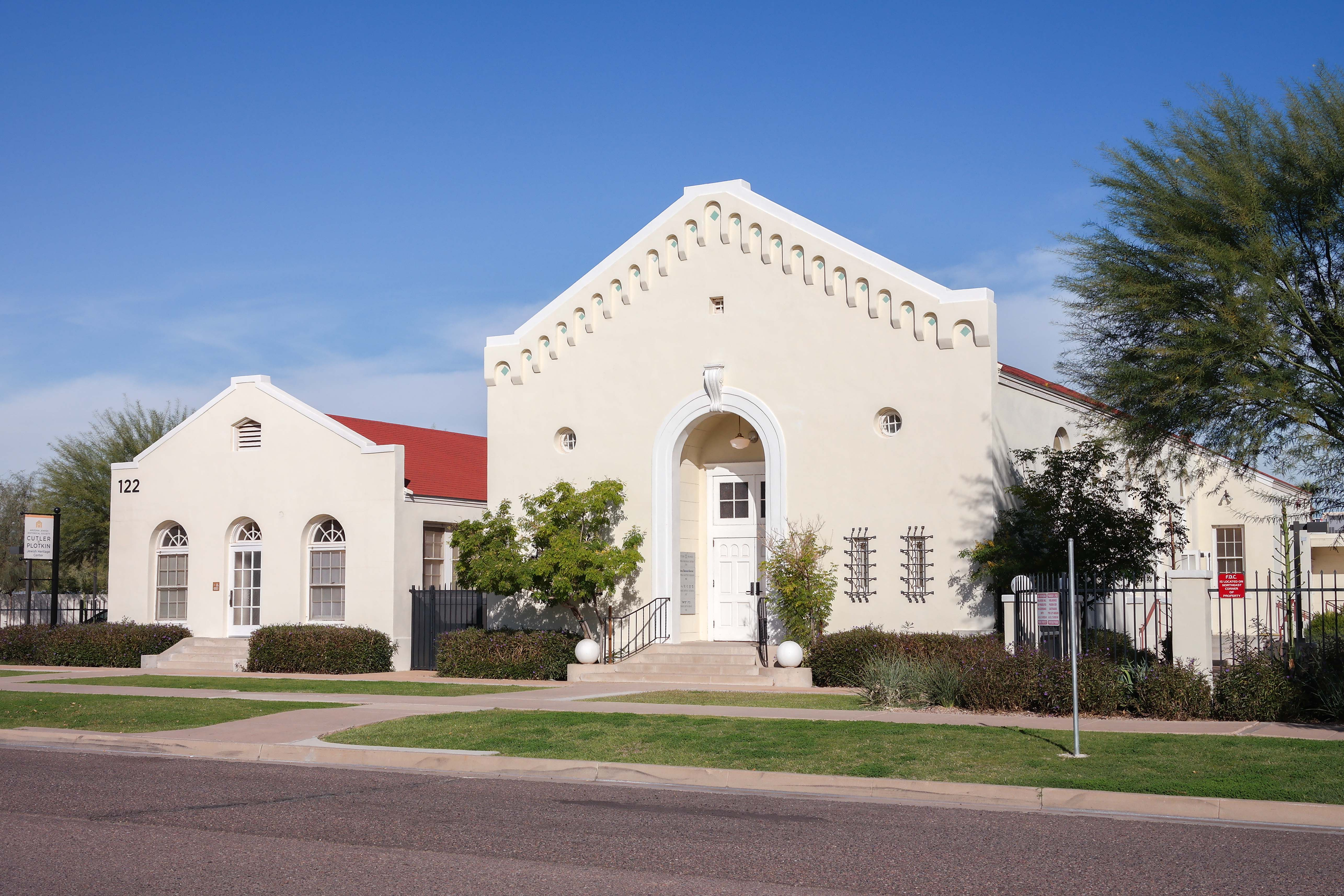
- The restored former synagogue, now museum, in 2013
- Location: 122 East Culver Street, Downtown Phoenix
- Coordinates: 33°27′47″N 112°04′20″W
- NRHP reference No.: 11000043
- PHPR No.: 197

Significant dates
- Added to NRHP: February 22, 2011
- Designated PHPR: June 2006

Congregation Beth Israel (Hebrew: בית ישראל) is a Reform Jewish congregation and synagogue, located at 10460 North 56th Street in Scottsdale, Arizona, in the United States. Incorporated in 1920, the congregation affiliated with the Union for Reform Judaism in 1935.

Abraham Lincoln Krohn was rabbi of Beth Israel from 1938 to 1953, and during his tenure the congregation grew from under 100 to almost 600 member families. He was succeeded by Albert Plotkin, who served for almost 40 years.

Beth Israel's original building in Downtown Phoenix, constructed in 1921–1922, is listed on both the city's historic property register and the National Register of Historic Places. After being sold in 1949, it housed churches until 2002, when the Jewish community repurchased it. In 2007 the Arizona Jewish Historical Society started a $4 million campaign to restore it and convert it into a museum. The museum opened in 2008 as the Cutler-Plotkin Jewish Heritage Center.

As of 2018, Beth Israel was the oldest synagogue in the Phoenix metropolitan area. The senior rabbi was Stephen Kahn, the associate rabbi was Sara Mason-Barkin, and the cantor was Seth Ettinger.

== Early years, first building ==
Jewish settlers in Phoenix began gathering for High Holiday services as early as 1906. A formal congregation was established by Barnett E. Marks, a lawyer from Chicago, who held services in a room over Melczer's saloon, and also organized a Sunday School to provide a Jewish education for his two sons. By 1918 the congregation was calling itself "Emanuel", and holding services in English and Hebrew on the Jewish Festivals. In 1920, the congregation incorporated as "Congregation Beth Israel". Its first rabbi was David L. Liknaitz, and its first president was Charles Steinberg. Liknaitz would serve until 1924.

Services were held in a number of temporary locations. In 1915 and 1917 respectively the local chapters of the B'nai B'rith and the National Council of Jewish Women were formed. Together they purchased a church in 1921, and converted it for use as a Phoenix's first synagogue by the Phoenix Hebrew Center Association. The Association soon became defunct, and the building was taken over by the Congregation Beth Israel.

That year the congregation raised $14,000 (today $253,000) and hired the architectural firm Lescher, Kibbey and Mahoney to design and construct a synagogue building near Central Avenue and Culver Street, in Downtown Phoenix. The building, a simple, stuccoed, gable-end-to-the-street Mission Revival Style structure, was constructed in 1921–1922, and an annex added in 1930.

At the time the building was constructed, the Phoenix area had only 120 Jewish residents. The synagogue served as a cultural center for the Jewish community, including hosting communal Passover Seders, at a time when Jews faced discrimination at hotels and other places of public gathering.

During the 1920s the synagogue had difficulty keeping rabbis. Most would only stay for a few years, and one in particular was suspected of being a charlatan; "[t]he rabbi college where he claimed he attended had no record of him." A.I. Goldberg served from 1924 to 1925, Adolph Rosenberg from 1926 to 1929.

In 1930, the congregation became divided over the need for the Jewish community to hire a shochet to ritually slaughter animals for kosher meat, and over whether the synagogue should hire a Reform or Conservative rabbi. More traditional members broke away to form the Beth El Congregation, affiliated with Conservative Judaism.

That year Samuel Dodkin Hurwitz was hired as Beth Israel's rabbi. Born in Krychaw, Belarus, in 1901, his family emigrated to the United States in 1903. He graduated from the University of Cincinnati in 1926, and was ordained at Hebrew Union College in 1929. His first pulpit, from 1929 to 1930, was Temple Emanuel in Davenport, Iowa. In 1934 he was appointed to the board of the Phoenix Public Library. In 1935 he left Beth Israel to become rabbi at Temple Beth El in Benton Harbor, Michigan.

Philip W. Jaffa, ordained at Hebrew Union College in 1928, joined as rabbi in 1935. He adopted the Reform Judaism's Union Prayer Book and its religious school curriculum, and added choir music to the services. That year much of the synagogue building was destroyed by a fire, and Jaffa's whole library was lost. The congregation re-built the structure, extensively remodeling the sanctuary, and added a religious school building/classroom annex. Jaffa would serve until 1938.

== Krohn era ==
Abraham Lincoln Krohn became Beth Israel's rabbi in 1938, replacing Jaffa, who was not well. At the time, the congregation had 100 or fewer member families, and 64 children in the religious school. Born in 1893 and named after Abraham Lincoln, Krohn was one of eight children of Russian Jews who had immigrated to the United States. His first career was as a social worker, but during a chance meeting, Stephen Samuel Wise was "so impressed with Krohn's compassion, intellect and eloquence [that] he strongly urged him to consider a career in the rabbinate." Krohn entered Wise's Jewish Institute of Religion in 1926, and graduated as a rabbi in 1930. He then served as assistant rabbi of Temple Sholom in Plainfield, New Jersey, for a year, then as senior rabbi at Temple Albert in Albuquerque, New Mexico, for almost seven years, before joining Beth Israel.

Krohn was heavily involved in the community. According to Ira Morton of the Arizona Jewish Historical Society:

The organizations he served in the capacity of president or board member include B'nai Brith, the Urban League, the Maricopa Mental Health Association and Child Guidance Clinic, Phoenix Public Library, Phoenix Elementary School District, the American Red Cross, the Roosevelt Council of Boy Scouts, the United Fund (later changed to United Way) and the Jewish Family Service (now Jewish Family & Children's Service), which Krohn founded. Krohn also served as president of the Valley of the Sun Symphony Orchestra, which later became the Phoenix Symphony, moderator of a Phoenix town hall lecture series, lecturer in biblical literature at Arizona State University and as a civilian chaplain for neighboring military bases and hospitals during World War II.

During Krohn's tenure the congregation began calling itself "Temple Beth Israel", and under his leadership the synagogue flourished.

During World War II, Beth Israel provided religious services for servicemen stationed at Luke Air Force Base, and hosted dances for the military personnel there. In 1942, the congregation started its Judaica library, which initially consisted of 60 works on one shelf.

By the late 1940s, the congregation had increased in size to approximately 300 families, and had outgrown its original facilities. The congregation moved to a more suburban location at Eleventh and Flower in 1949, and formalized its relationship with the Reform movement by joining the Union of American Hebrew Congregations (now the Union for Reform Judaism). The Central Avenue and Culver Street building was sold to the Southern Baptist Convention, and housed the First Chinese Baptist Church until 1981, and then the Iglesia Bautista Central. By 2001 it was on the market again, and the Jewish community raised $540,000 (today $970,000) to purchase it in 2002. The building is listed on both the city's historic property register and the National Register of Historic Places.

When Krohn stepped down as rabbi in 1953 due to poor health, the congregation had grown to 538 families. Krohn had also been active in interfaith work, and in June, 1958 was named Man of the Year by the National Conference of Christians and Jews at its annual dinner. He was, however, too ill to attend, and died five months later.

== Plotkin and Segel eras ==
By 1955, Phoenix's Jewish population had grown to over 3,000 families, and the city still had two Jewish congregations, Beth Israel and Beth El. That year, with the support of Krohn, Albert Plotkin joined Beth Israel as rabbi. Born in 1920 and raised in South Bend, Indiana, his parents were immigrants from Russia. After getting an undergraduate degree from the University of Notre Dame, he entered Hebrew Union College in 1943 – on academic probation, because he had taken no Hebrew at Notre Dame. He was ordained by Hebrew Union College in 1948, graduating with a Master of Hebrew Letters. Plotkin had started his rabbinic career as assistant rabbi of Temple De Hirsch in Seattle, his first pulpit after ordination. There he met his future wife Sylvia Pincus, whose family were long-time members of Temple De Hirsch. They married a year later, and shortly after moved to Spokane, Washington, where Plotkin became senior rabbi at Temple Emanuel.

During his tenure at Beth Israel, Plotkin was heavily involved in Phoenix's Jewish and non-Jewish communities. He was a strong Zionist at Hebrew Union College, at a time when the movement was unpopular there, and was later a staunch supporter of Israel. He was an advocate for civil rights, and a supporter of the arts. He founded the Jewish Studies program at Arizona State University and taught there, and volunteered for 25 years as a chaplain at Phoenix Veterans Hospital. In 1972, the National Conference of Christians and Jews awarded him the National Award for Brotherhood.

Beth Israel added a "cultural and educational wing" to its Flower Street building in 1967, and in it Sylvia Plotkin founded a Jewish museum. The museum had three galleries: one "house[d] artifacts from a Tunisian synagogue, a second [held] a Judaica collection that chronicle[d] the history of Arizona Jewry and a third [was] used for exhibitions." Sylvia Plotkin would direct the museum until her death in 1996, acquiring and mounting many exhibitions there. Renamed the "Sylvia Plotkin Judaica Museum" the day before her death, it was "one of the largest and most respected synagogue museums in the United States." After Plotkin's death, Pamela Levin became the museum's director; she had begun working with Plotkin as a volunteer in 1985, and eventually earned a degree in museum studies.

Albert Plotkin would himself go on to serve as the congregation's rabbi for almost 40 years, retiring in 1992, and becoming rabbi emeritus. He loved opera music, and two years after retiring, he sang professionally with the Arizona Opera. The Plotkins' daughter Debra would become the founding artistic director of the Toronto Jewish Film Festival, and their daughter Janis was, for 21 years, one of the main forces behind the San Francisco Jewish Film Festival, and its executive director from 1994 to 2002.

Plotkin was succeeded by Kenneth Segel in 1992, and the following year Howard Tabaknek joined as cantor. In 1997, the congregation moved to its current location at 10460 North 56th Street and Shea Boulevard. The 45,000-square-foot (4,200 m^{2}) building had a main sanctuary that seated 500, and a chapel that seated 300. The Torah ark was decorated with "fused glass surrounded by colored glass".

Tabaknek left to join Temple Shalom in Succasunna, New Jersey in 2000, and was replaced by Andrew Meyer as cantor and Michael Sokol as "cantorial soloist". Meyer had previously served for five years as spiritual leader of Temple Beth Emeth in Scottsdale, Arizona. Sokol, who grew up in Phoenix and had his Bar Mitzvah at Beth Israel, was a professor of voice and opera at University of California, Santa Barbara, and sang with New York's Metropolitan Opera for three years.

Segel would serve as rabbi until 2002, moving to Temple Beth Or in Montgomery, Alabama.

== Recent events ==
Stephen Kahn became Beth Israel's rabbi in July 2003. By then, membership was approximately 1,000 families, the largest Jewish congregation in Arizona. The congregational library, which was open to the public, had grown to over 20,000 volumes, making it one of the largest Judaica libraries in the Southwestern United States.

For financial reasons, Levin's job as museum director was reduced from 25 to 12 hours per week in 2004, and the position made volunteer in 2005. By then, the museum had 8,000 visitors a year, regular traveling exhibits, and the number of artifacts in it had grown to over 1,000.

In 2005, the congregation purchased a 1.25-acre (0.51 ha) lot across the street from its building, and the house on it, to accommodate future growth. At that time the synagogue had over 900 member families.

That year the congregation also reverted to its original name of "Congregation Beth Israel". In Kahn's view, "To me, a 'congregation' represents people and community while the word "temple" represents a place or building. I would like us to be about the people."

The Arizona Jewish Historical Society undertook a $4 million campaign in 2007 to raise the funds needed to restore the original synagogue building and other related structures to create the Cutler-Plotkin Jewish Heritage Center. The plan was for the Center to include a museum and other public spaces that would be used to show the connection between the history of the Jewish community as part of Arizona's history. A $150,000 grant had been received in May of that year from the Arizona State Heritage Fund. By August 2008 much of the work of the first phase – the restoration of the sanctuary and annex – had been completed, and $2.1 million of the $2.6 million required for the work had been raised.

In 2007, Beth Israel opened the Phoenix metropolitan area's first mikvah (ritual bath). It was, according to local Modern Orthodox rabbi Darren Kleinberg, "the first time in Jewish history that a mikvah has been built and approved under the auspices of Reform, Conservative and Orthodox rabbis."

The congregation also hired Jaime Shpall as cantor that year, replacing Bruce Benson, who left in 2006. Shpall, who graduated as a cantor from the Hebrew Union College in 1997, had previously served as cantor of Congregation Beth Israel in Austin, Texas. Plotkin died in February 2010.

As of 2014, Beth Israel was the oldest congregation in the Phoenix metropolitan area. The senior rabbi was Stephen Kahn, the associate rabbi was Rony Keller, and the cantor was Jaime Shpall. The congregation also owned and operated Camp Daisy and Harry Stein, a Jewish overnight camp in Prescott National Forest near Prescott, Arizona, the only Jewish camp in the area.

== Cutler-Plotkin Jewish Heritage Center ==
Located in the historic former synagogue building at 122 East Culver Street, Phoenix, the Cutler-Plotkin Jewish Heritage Center was named in honor of both Rabbi Emeritus Albert Plotkin who had served as rabbi for nearly forty years, and Lawrence Cutler, a major donor to the synagogue. The building was designed in 1920 by architects Lescher, Kibbey, and Mahoney in the style of a Spanish mission. Although Jewish houses of worship are usually aligned on an east–west axis, the former Temple Beth Israel axis is north–south.

The congregation sold the property in 1949 to a Chinese-language Baptist Church, and later the building was occupied by a Spanish-language Baptist Church. In 2002, the property was purchased by the Arizona Jewish Historical Society. Following its restoration, the former synagogue site was listed on the National Register of Historic Places in 2011 and was listed as one of the Phoenix Points of Pride.

== See also ==
- List of historic properties in Phoenix
- National Register of Historic Places listings in Phoenix, Arizona
- Phoenix Historic Property Register
