= Young Friends General Meeting =

British national organization for young Quakers

(The General Meeting of) Young Friends in Britain (YFiB) is the national organisation for young Quakers (from 18 to 35) in the United Kingdom. The name refers both to the organisation and to the General Meetings which are held in February, May and October each year, in various Quaker Meeting Houses in Britain. The organization used to publish a tri-annual magazine entitled The Young Quaker.

== History ==
The Young Friends Movement in the United Kingdom emerged in the first decade of the twentieth Century, inspired by John Wilhelm Rowntree and led by Neave Brayshaw. The first National Conference of Young Friends was held in August 1911. Among the first generation were many conscientious objectors, who suffered badly during the Great War.

The movement has influenced Britain Yearly Meeting strongly during the twentieth century, for instance on the issue of ethical investments.

The name changed from Young Friends Central Committee to Young Friends General Meeting in 1993. In 2026, Young Friends General Meeting changed its name to (The General Meeting of) Young Friends in Britain; keeping general meeting in brackets to explain to the charittess commission the purpose of the group while recognising that with the General Meeting for Scotland becoming Quakers in Scotland, it was now the only General Meeting left in Britain

In 1998, YFiB gave the annual Swarthmore Lecture to Friends gathered at Yearly Meeting in London, with the title Who do we think we are? Young Friends' Commitment and Belonging.

Perhaps summing up its work is a statement from 1926:

'Our work is based on the thought that 'What you have inherited from your forefathers, you must acquire for yourselves to possess it'. That is to say that each generation of Young Friends by its experiments must discover for itself the truths on which the Society is built, if it is to use those truths, and to continue and enlarge the work of the Society. Hence the occasional separate meetings of younger Friends and our desire to have means of expressing corporately our own experience' (Quaker Faith & Practice, 21.04)

== Current ==
Young Friends in Britain is represented on various Quaker bodies in the United Kingdom, including two representatives on Meeting for Sufferings.

== Events ==
Young Friends in Britain arranges several events each year. In addition to three General Meetings and three Planning Weekends annually, smaller groups of YFiB members often arrange smaller local or themed events.

=== General Meetings ===
Foremost among these are the General Meetings, which take place at a Meeting House somewhere in Britain three times each year, usually in February, May, and October. These are residential weekend events with most participants sleeping in the Meeting House. These events are the main venue for conducting the business of the meeting, and also serve as spiritual gatherings, and act as the hub of the community. In addition to conducting the business of the organisation, these events usually include a range of activities, including sessions with a focus on spirituality, external speakers, and the opportunity to join with local Friends for Meeting for Worship.

=== Planning Weekends ===
Smaller events, Planning Weekends, which take place around six weeks before General Meetings, serve a dual purpose. Primarily, they exist to plan the proceedings of the General Meeting held in the following month. They also serve as a venue for the meeting of committees, encouraging cooperation and awareness between them.

=== Pardshaw Gatherings ===
Historically, YFiB was responsible for Pardshaw Young Friends' Centre and regularly held gatherings there. However, in 2008 YFiB agreed to hand over responsibility for Pardshaw to West Cumbria Area Meeting.

=== YF (GM Free) ===
These events, which are YFiB events without the business, are usually organised by small groups of YFiB participants on a specific theme, or simply to enjoy each other's company. Previous events have included a theme of mental wellbeing, and a retreat at Yealand Meeting House.

== The Young Quaker ==
The Young Quaker (TYQ) was a magazine produced three times each year by Young Friends in Britain from 2013 to 2019. Previously known as Young Quaker and published monthly, it provides a forum for religious, social, environmental and other issues. It listed national and international events as well as changes of address and other notices. Because it was the magazine of Young Friends in Britain, Young Quaker was primarily aimed at people between the ages of 18 and 30. The magazine was also read by young people under 18. Writer Charlie Brooker stated that the magazine "largely consisted of poetry and people wearing sensible hand-knitted jumpers."

=== Production ===
While its predecessor, Young Quaker (YQ) was sold predominantly on a subscription only basis, The Young Quaker was free at YFiB events and by request from the YFiB Office. It was also available to read on YFiB's website.

The magazine had five editors which are appointed by Young Friends in Britain, having been discerned by YFiB's Nominations Committee. Co-editors were usually appointed for a period of three years.

=== History ===
The Young Quaker was started in 1922, as a natural development from the Young Friends movement. It stopped after a couple of years and resurfaced in the mid-1930s as a quarterly European publication. It went to ground again and then came back in the 1940s during the second world war as a London news sheet for young Friends. In 1956 production began regularly under the title Young Quaker and the magazine was published continuously until 2011. A full archive of can be found in the library at Friends House.

== See also ==
- European and Middle East Young Friends
- Junior Young Friends
