= Debbie Friedman =

Jewish American singer-songwriter of liturgical music

Background information
- Born: Deborah Lynn Friedman; February 23, 1951; Utica, New York
- Died: January 9, 2011 (aged 59) Mission Viejo, California
- Genre: Music-Jewish Liturgy
- Occupation: Jewish songwriter/songleader
- Instrument: Guitar
- Years active: 1971–2011
- Website: debbiefriedmanmusic.com

Deborah Lynn Friedman (February 23, 1951 – January 9, 2011) was an American singer-songwriter of religious Jewish music. She was an early pioneer of gender-sensitive language: using the feminine forms of the Divine or altering masculine-only text references in the Jewish Liturgy to include feminine language.

She is best known for her setting of "Mi Shebeirach" the prayer for Healing. Her songs are used in Reform, Conservative, and Orthodox Jewish congregations.

== Career ==
Friedman wrote many of her early songs as a song leader at the overnight camp Olin Sang Ruby Union Institute in Oconomowoc, Wisconsin, in the early 1970s. Between 1971 and 2010, she recorded 22 albums. Her work was inspired by such diverse sources as Joan Baez, Peter, Paul and Mary and a number of other folk music artists. Friedman employed both English and Hebrew lyrics and wrote for all ages. Some of her songs are "The Aleph Bet Song", "Miriam's Song", and the songs "Not By Might" and "I Am A Latke". She also performed in synagogues and concert halls.

In the fall of 1972, Friedman moved to Chicago. Friedman was commissioned by Chicago's Temple Sinai, and Rabbi Samuel Karff invited Friedman to join his congregation as an artist in residence that fall. While Friedman was being commissioned by Chicago Sinai, she produced three large-scale works between 1972 and 1975 that reflected liberal Judaism's demographic and liturgical transitions.

During her time in Chicago, Friedman enrolled in Spertus Institute (formerly Chicago College of Jewish Studies).

In 2007, Friedman accepted an appointment to the faculty of Hebrew Union College-Jewish Institute of Religion's School of Sacred Music in New York (now called the Debbie Friedman School of Sacred Music) where she instructed both rabbinic and cantorial students. She was also an honorary member of the American Conference of Cantors.

In 2010, she was named to the Forward 50 after the release of her 22nd album, As You Go On Your Way: Shacharit – The Morning Prayers.

Orthodox Jewish feminist Blu Greenberg noted: "she had a large impact [in] Modern Orthodox shuls, women's tefillah [prayer], [and] Orthodox feminist circles.... She was a religious bard and angel for the entire community." According to Cantor Harold Messinger of Beth Am Israel in Penn Valley, Pennsylvania, "Debbie was the first, and every contemporary hazzan, song leader, and layperson who values these concepts is in her debt."

== Personal life ==
The daughter of Freda and Gabriel Friedman, Friedman was born in Utica, New York, in 1951. From age five, she was raised in St. Paul, Minnesota, where she received choral training with her high school's chamber choir and song-leading lessons with her NoFTY youth group. In 1969, Friedman graduated from Highland Park High School in Saint Paul, Minnesota. She was inducted into the school's Hall of Fame in 1999.

In the 1990s, Friedman began suffering from a neurological condition with symptoms apparently similar to multiple sclerosis. The story of her music, as well as the challenges she faced in living with illness, was featured in a 2004 documentary film about Friedman called A Journey of Spirit, produced by Ann Coppel, which followed her from 1997 to 2002.

Friedman was a lesbian, but did not talk about it in public. Her obituary in The New York Times was the first place her sexual identity was publicized.

== Death and legacy ==
Friedman was admitted to a Mission Viejo, California, Hospital in January 2011, where she died on January 9, 2011, from pneumonia.

Rabbi David Ellenson, then-President of Hebrew Union College – Jewish Institute of Religion, announced on January 27, 2011, that the college's School of Sacred Music would be renamed the Debbie Friedman School of Sacred Music. On December 7, 2011, it was officially renamed as such.

In 2014, the book Sing Unto God: The Debbie Friedman Anthology was published, featuring a comprehensive collection of her music.

Despite the central role that music played in her career and life, members of Friedman's family argued that Friedman herself may have found the collection problematic in some ways, preferring oral communication to the written word.

Notwithstanding Debbie's feelings, we believe people will want this anthology. We believe people will want to hold onto and perpetuate Debbie's message. Over the years, there will be variations on her compositions. That will be inevitable. But Debbie's gift is reflected in the uniqueness of her melodies, original lyrics, and chosen texts. The purpose of this project is to provide people with her original works as she created them. (Eglash 2013, p. viii) Friedman ultimately wanted to strengthen Jewish life by leveraging her unique philosophy of music as an immediate spiritual experience.

Among her music that remains the most sung in North American Jewish communities are her Mi Shebeirach (co-written with her partner Drorah Setel), "Miriam's Song" and her Havdalah melody. Throughout her career of songleading and writing, Friedman always sought to empower Jewish communities to bring their own voices and experiences to Jewish worship in an evolving and constantly changing period for the religion.

== Discography ==
=== Studio albums ===
- Sing Unto God (1972)
- Not by Might Not by Power (1974)
- Ani Ma-Amin (1976)
- If Not Now, When? (1980)
- ...And The Youth Shall See Visions (1981)
- And You Shall Be a Blessing.... (1989)
- Debbie Friedman: Live at the Del (1990)
- The World of Your Dreams (1993)
- Miracles & Wonders (1995)
- Shirim Al Galgalim: Songs on Wheels (1995)
- Shanah Tovah: A Good Year (1996)
- Renewal of Spirit (1997)
- The Journey Continues: Ma'yan Passover Haggadah In Song (1997)
- It's You (1998)
- The Alef Bet (2001)
- The Water in the Well (2001)
- Light These Lights: Debbie Friedman Sings Chanukah Songs For The Whole Family (2003)
- One People (2006)
- As You Go On Your Way: Shacharit – The Morning Prayers (2008)

=== Live albums ===
- Debbie Friedman: Live at the Del (1990)
- At Carnegie Hall (1996)

=== Compilations ===
- In The Beginning (1994)
- Songs of the Spirit - The Debbie Friedman Anthology (2005)
