= Drorah Setel =

American biblical scholar, rabbi, and feminist theologian

Drorah Setel is an American biblical scholar and feminist theologian from Buffalo, New York, who was formerly a rabbi at Kadima Reconstructionist Community in Seattle, Washington, and Temple Beth El in Niagara Falls, NY. She presently serves as rabbi to the Temple Emanu-El congregation at the Jewish Community Center in Brighton, a suburb of Rochester, New York.

A social activist and a spiritual caregiver, Setel is known as a co-writer, with Debbie Friedman, of the "Mi Shebeirach" sung in Reform Jewish communities today. Ellen Umansky has listed Setel as among the most prominent Jewish feminist theologians.

Rabbi Setel is a graduate of Swarthmore College, Harvard Divinity School, and SUNY Buffalo Law School as well as having studied at the London School of Economics and Political Science, in the Religious Studies doctoral program at Yale University, and the rabbinic program at the Leo Baeck College, London, UK.

In the 1980's, Setel convened the first meeting of Ameinu, an underground network of LGBTQIA+ Jewish clergy members and professionals that offered support otherwise unavailable in institutional Jewish spaces. In 1990 Rabbi Setel co-convened the first gathering of Jewish professionals and activists working to prevent sexual and domestic violence in the Jewish community. In 1996 Rabbi Setel became the first person in Jewish history to be ordained by a rabbinical court composed solely of women.

Setel is a divorced mother of three children.
