= Janet Marder =

American rabbi

- Born: Janet Ross Marder; 1954 (age 71–72); Los Angeles, California, U.S.
- Education: University of California, Santa Cruz (BA); Hebrew Union College – Jewish Institute of Religion (MAHL)
- Occupation: Rabbi
- Known for: First female president of the Central Conference of American Rabbis
- Spouse: Rabbi Sheldon Marder
- Children: 2

Janet Marder was the first female president of the Reform Movement's Central Conference of American Rabbis (CCAR), which means she was the first woman to lead a major rabbinical organization and the first woman to lead any major Jewish co-ed religious organization in the United States; she became president of the CCAR in 2003. She was also the first woman and the first non-congregational rabbi to be elected as the President of the Pacific Association of Reform Rabbis; she was their president in 1995.

She was born in Los Angeles, and was ordained in New York in 1979 at the Hebrew Union College-Jewish Institute of Religion, a Reform seminary. She became the first ordained rabbi of Beth Chayim Chadashim (the world's first gay and lesbian synagogue recognized by Reform Judaism) in 1983. While there she founded NECHAMA, an AIDS-education program for the Jewish community. In 1988, she became the assistant director of the Union of American Hebrew Congregations Pacific Southwest Council, where she worked for eleven years, eventually becoming director. In 1999, she became the Senior Rabbi of Congregation Beth Am in Los Altos Hills, California. She is now retired.

She is the coeditor of Mishkan HaNefesh: Machzor for the Days of Awe (Central Conference of American Rabbis, 2015).

== See also ==
- Timeline of women rabbis
