= Eldering =

Eldering was a term originally used by the Quakers to denote the religious training and education of young adults by their elders. Age was not a prerequisite, but familiarity, through personal experience, with the religious traditions and a spiritual life was. Eldering in the Quaker tradition was commonly thought of as not only teaching, but also correcting behavior. It can only be undertaken by a committee or, on occasion, an individual designated by the committee. Elders are primarily concerned with nurturing the spiritual life of their community and individuals within that group.

== Spiritual eldering ==
Spiritual eldering is a term used by the Spiritual Eldering Institute, a multi-faith U.S.-based organization, to denote a focus in later life on spiritual development, interpersonal relationships, communication and service. The institute is dedicated to the spiritual dimensions of aging and conscious living as expressed in the work of Rabbi Zalman Schlachter-Shalomi. His 1995 book, From Age-ing to Sage-ing (Warner Books), forms the basis of the Institute's teachings. Currently, the Sage-ing Guild, a networking organization formed in 2004, leads discussions, classes and workshops across the U.S. and trains facilitators in Rabbi Schlachter-Shalomi's philosophy. The terms "spiritual eldering" and "sage-ing" are used synonymously and are trademarked by the institute.

== New eldering ==
In 2006, The Eldering Institute began using the word "eldering" to distinguish "wisdom in action"—with the focus on action. The phrase suggests that if we traffic in our experience and the knowledge we have accrued over the years without being in action or without having the capacity to inspire action in others, then all our "wisdom" is little more than a pile of comforting and mostly meaningless memories. When we stop the action, we become spectators and begin a process of detachment and inevitable decline. Eldering, in this sense, conveys the idea that life can continuously improve as we get older, provided that we continue to add value (be of service) and that we create and sustain authentic relationships with others of all ages.

The action of an elder is eldering and involves most of the elements of effective leadership, including:

- Being responsible
- Being humble and profoundly acknowledging of others
- Being curious about and interested in others
- Accepting people and circumstances as they are
- Being whole and complete and helping others to be the same
- Being committed to possibilities
- Creating empowering and trusting relationships with others
- Coaching others to accomplish more than they think is possible
- Creating results and being wary of self-deception
- Listening generously
- Thinking rigorously
- Enrolling others in the future
- Having committed conversations

Being an elder in the twenty-first century is being a human being who is recognized by a community as having some wisdom to offer of continuing value. As such, it is not limited by age, nor is it an entitlement. It is not possible to declare oneself an elder in the absence of relationships with others in a community. For example, The Elders (or Global Elders), a select group of 12 convened by Nelson Mandela, Desmond Tutu and Graça Machel and including Kofi Annan, Jimmy Carter and Mary Robinson (among others), have pledged themselves to act as global elders to "support courage where there is fear, foster agreement where there is conflict, and inspire hope where there is despair".
