= List of LGBTQ firsts by year =

This list of lesbian, gay, bisexual, transgender and queer (LGBTQ) firsts by year denotes pioneering LGBTQ endeavors organized chronologically. Openly LGBTQ people remain a demographic minority in most places. In areas that historically are not known for having (or being friendly to) LGBTQ people who do not remain closeted, a "first" can make it easier for other openly LGBTQ persons to enter the field or for those who are closeted to come out. Openly LGBTQ people being visible in society affects societal attitudes toward homosexuality, bisexuality, and the transgender community on a wider level.

One commonly cited example is Michael McConnell and Jack Baker, the first openly gay couple to apply for a marriage license in 1971. Another is Harvey Milk, the first openly gay person to be elected to political office in California, becoming the most visible LGBTQ politician in the world in the 1970s, after decades of resistance to LGBTQ people by mainstream culture. Milk encouraged LGBTQ people to "come out of the closet" during his speeches; as a result of his work and his assassination—along with San Francisco mayor George Moscone—thousands of ordinary people did so. In 2002, Milk was called "the most famous and most significantly open LGBT official ever elected in the United States".

== 1600s ==
=== 1672 ===
- The Life and Struggles of Our Mother Wälättä P̣eṭros (1672) contains the first reference to homosexuality between nuns in Ethiopian literature.

== 1800s to 1930s ==
=== 1896 ===
- The first issue of Der Eigene appeared in Berlin. It was one of the first gay periodicals in the world.

=== 1897 ===
- The Scientific-Humanitarian Committee was formed in Berlin. It was the first LGBT rights organizations in history.

=== 1904 ===
- German journalist Anna Rüling, in a speech to the Scientific-Humanitarian Committee, made one of the first known public statements of the social and legal problems faced by lesbians.
- In December, Karl M. Baer became the first transgender person to undergo gender-affirming surgery.

=== 1912 ===
- The first explicit reference to lesbianism in a Mormon magazine occurred when the Young Woman's Journal paid tribute to "Sappho of Lesbos".

=== 1918 ===
- The publication Les Mouches fantastiques, the first known LGBT periodical in North American history, was launched in Montreal, Quebec by poet Elsa Gidlow and journalist Roswell George Mills.

=== 1919 ===
- Baron Franz Nopcsa von Felső-Szilvás and Bajazid Elmaz Doda, a gay couple, committed the first hijacking of an aircraft.
- The film Different from the Others was released. It was one of the first sympathetic portrayals of gay men in cinema.

=== 1923 ===
- Elsa Gidlow, born in England, published the first volume of openly lesbian love poetry in the United States, titled On A Grey Thread.

=== 1924 ===
- The Society for Human Rights, the first gay rights organization in the United States (West Third), was established.
- The Society for Human Rights began publication of Friendship and Freedom, the first American gay publication.
- The first issue of Die Freundin (The Girlfriend) was published; it was the first lesbian magazine worldwide.

=== 1927 ===
- Wings was released and included possibly the first on screen male–male kiss in cinema.

== 1930s ==
=== 1931 ===
- In Berlin, Dora Richter was the first known transgender woman to undergo vaginoplasty.
- Mädchen in Uniform was released and was the first film with a pro-lesbian story.

=== 1936 ===
- Mona's 440 Club, the first lesbian bar in America, opened in San Francisco. Mona's waitresses and female performers wore tuxedos and patrons dressed their roles.

=== 1937 ===
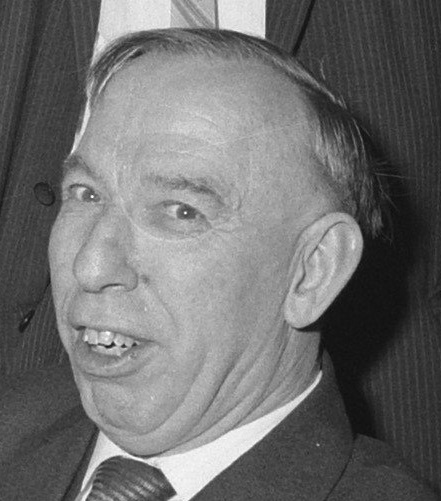
Hein Vos

- Hein Vos became the first known gay Dutch Member of the House of Representatives.

=== 1939 ===
- Frances V. Rummell, an educator and a teacher of French at Stephens College, published an autobiography under the title Diana: A Strange Autobiography; it was the first explicitly lesbian autobiography in which two women end up happily together. This autobiography was published with a note saying, "The publishers wish it expressly understood that this is a true story, the first of its kind ever offered to the general reading public".

== 1940s ==
=== 1944 ===
- The poet Robert Duncan became the first prominent American to reveal his homosexuality. This occurred when in 1944, using his own name in the anarchist magazine Politics, he wrote that homosexuals were an oppressed minority.

=== 1945 ===
- Hein Vos became the first known Dutch gay Government minister.

=== 1947 ===
- Vice Versa began publication as the first lesbian-interest publication in the United States.

== 1950s ==
- Rina Natan became the first transgender woman in Israel to undergo gender-affirming surgery.

=== 1950 ===
- The Mattachine Society, an early gay rights organization, was founded in Los Angeles by Harry Hay.

=== 1952 ===
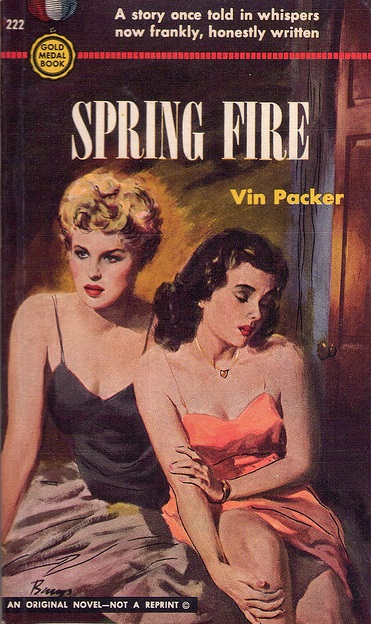
Cover of Spring Fire (1952) by Vin Packer (a.k.a. Marijane Meaker)

- Christine Jorgensen became the first widely known American to have gender-affirming surgery, which took place in Denmark.
- Patricia Highsmith published the first lesbian romantic novel which does not end badly; The Price of Salt. Its relatively happy ending was unprecedented in lesbian literature.
- Spring Fire, the first lesbian paperback novel, and the beginning of the lesbian pulp fiction genre, was published in 1952 and sold 1.5 million copies. It was written by lesbian Marijane Meaker under the false name Vin Packer, and ended unhappily.
- ONE magazine published as the first gay men's magazine in the United States. Founded in Los Angeles, it would later transform into an educational institution and then into ONE National Gay & Lesbian Archives, one of the world's largest and oldest surviving LGBT archives.

=== 1955 ===
- The Daughters of Bilitis (DOB) was founded in San Francisco in 1955 by four lesbian couples (including Del Martin and Phyllis Lyon) and was the first national lesbian political and social organization in the United States.

=== 1956 ===
- The Ladder, widely considered the first lesbian magazine in the United States, began publication. It was the primary publication and method of communication for the Daughters of Bilitis, the first lesbian organization in the US.

=== 1958 ===
- The first gay leather bar in the United States, the Gold Coast, opened in Chicago in 1958. It was founded by Dom Orejudos and Chuck Renslow.
- One, Inc. v. Olesen, 355 U.S. 371 (1958), was the first U.S. Supreme Court ruling to deal with homosexuality and the first to address free speech rights with respect to homosexuality. The Supreme Court reversed a lower court ruling that the gay magazine ONE magazine violated obscenity laws, thus upholding constitutional protection for pro-homosexual writing.

=== 1959 ===
- South, the earliest known gay TV drama, was first broadcast in the UK on 24 November 1959. Two other dramas based on the court trials of Oscar Wilde and Sir Roger Casement, who were both charged with homosexuality, were produced a year later.

== 1960s ==
=== 1960 ===
- Fannie Mae Clackum and Grace Garner, U.S. Air Force reservists in the late 1940s and early 1950s, became the first people to successfully challenge their discharges from the U.S. military for being gay, although the ruling turned on the fact that there was not enough evidence to show the women were lesbians—rather than that there was nothing wrong with it if they were.
- Nancy Ledins, an ordained Catholic priest, came out as a transgender woman, arguably becoming the first woman and first openly transgender Catholic priest.

=== 1961 ===
- José Sarria became the first openly gay person to run for public office in the United States (San Francisco city-county supervisor).
- The Rejected, the first documentary on homosexuality broadcast on American television, was first broadcast on KQED TV in San Francisco on 11 September 1961.
- Victim was the first British film to explicitly name homosexuality and deal with it sympathetically.

=== 1962 ===
- The Tavern Guild, the first gay business association in the United States, was created by gay bar owners in 1962 as a response to continued police harassment and closing of gay bars (including the Tay-Bush Inn raid), and continued until 1995.

=== 1964 ===
- The first photograph of lesbians on the cover of lesbian magazine The Ladder appeared in September 1964, showing two women from the back, on a beach looking out to sea.
- The June 1964 Paul Welch Life article entitled "Homosexuality In America" was the first time a national publication reported on gay issues.
- The Council on Religion and the Homosexual was founded, and was one of the first groups in the U.S. to use the word "homosexual" in its name.

=== 1965 ===
- Vanguard, an organization of LGBT youth in the low-income Tenderloin district of San Francisco, was created in 1965. It is considered the first Gay Liberation organization in the U.S.
- The Council on Religion and the Homosexual held an event where local politicians could be questioned about issues concerning gay and lesbian people, including police intimidation. The event marks the second known instance of "the gay vote" being sought. The first was during the early homosexual emancipation movement in Germany.

=== 1966 ===
- The first lesbian to appear on the cover of lesbian magazine The Ladder with her face showing was Lilli Vincenz in January 1966.
- In 1966 the first case to consider transidentity in the US was heard, Mtr. of Anonymous v. Weiner, 50 Misc. 2d 380, 270 N.Y.S.2d 319 (1966). The case concerned a transgender person from New York City who had undergone sex reassignment surgery and wanted a change of name and sex on their birth certificate. The New York City Health Department refused to grant the request, and the court ruled that the New York City and New Jersey Health Code only permitted a change of sex on the birth certificate if an error was made recording it at birth, so the Health Department acted correctly. The decision of the court in Weiner was affirmed in a case brought by Deborah Hartin, Mtr. of Hartin v. Dir. of Bur. of Recs., 75 Misc. 2d 229, 232, 347 N.Y.S.2d 515 (1973) and Anonymous v. Mellon, 91 Misc. 2d 375, 383, 398 N.Y.S.2d 99 (1977).
- The Society for Individual Rights opened the first gay and lesbian community center in the United States.

=== 1967 ===
- Grupo Nuestro Mundo (English: "Our World Group") was formed in Greater Buenos Aires, as the first gay rights organization in Argentina and Latin America.
- Craig Rodwell opens the Oscar Wilde Memorial Bookstore, the first bookstore devoted to gay and lesbian authors.
- The Homosexuals, a 1967 episode of the documentary television series CBS Reports, was the first network documentary dealing with the topic of homosexuality.

=== 1968 ===
- In the aftermath of the Compton's Cafeteria riot, a network of transgender social, psychological, and medical support services was established, which culminated in 1968 with the creation of the National Transsexual Counseling Unit (NTCU), the first such peer-run support and advocacy organization in the world.

=== 1969 ===
- Rev. James Lewis Stoll, M. Div. (January 18, 1936 – December 8, 1994), a Unitarian Universalist minister, became the first ordained minister of an established denomination to come out as gay. He went on to lead the effort that convinced the Unitarian Universalist Association to pass their first-ever gay rights resolution in 1970.
- The Gay Liberation Front was formed in America, and it was the first gay organization to use "gay" in its name.

=== 1960s (year unknown) ===
- In the late 1960s in New York, Mario Martino founded the Labyrinth Foundation Counseling Service, which was the first transgender community-based organization that specifically addressed the needs of female-to-male transgender people.

== 1970s ==
=== 1970 ===
- The Amazon Bookstore Cooperative opened, the first lesbian/feminist bookstore in the U.S. It later became True Colors bookstore (with a labrys acting as the "T",) but has since closed.
- On June 27, 1970, the first gay and lesbian pride parade in the world was held in Chicago, followed by a march in New York City and a parade in Los Angeles on June 28, 1970, to commemorate the anniversary of the Stonewall riots. Today such parades are held annually throughout the world.
- In September 1970, University of Southern California staff member Del Whan taught the first LGBTQ class at USC. Her class, entitled "Social Movement: Gay Liberation" was offered through the Experimental College. It soon evolved into a student group called The Gay Liberation Forum, the first gay and lesbian group on campus. After years of struggle, the group was finally recognized by USC in 1975. It continues today under the name Queer and Ally Student Assembly.
- In 1970, the Task Force on Gay Liberation formed within the American Library Association. Now known as the Rainbow Round Table, this organization is the oldest LGBTQ professional organization in the United States.

=== 1971 ===
- The All in the Family episode "Judging Books by Covers" features the first LGBT person on primetime TV. Steve, played by Philip Carey, tells Archie he is gay.
- James Michael McConnell (born 1942) and Richard John "Jack" Baker (born 1942) became the first legally married same-sex couple in United States history. Their marriage is also "the earliest same-gender marriage ever to be recorded in the public files of any civil government."
- Jim Morris became the first openly gay IFBB professional bodybuilder.
- In February 1971 Virginia Hoeffding and Del Whan of the Los Angeles Gay Liberation Front opened the Gay Women's Service Center in Echo Park, the first social service center for lesbian women in the country. Their listing in the phone book was the first time the word "Gay" had ever appeared in the directory.
- The University of Michigan became the first college in America to establish an LGBT office.
- In 1971, during a UCLA conference called "The Homosexual in America", Betty Berzon became the first psychotherapist in the country to come out as gay to the public.
- Frank Kameny became the first openly gay candidate for the United States Congress when he ran in the District of Columbia's first election for a non-voting Congressional delegate.
- Boys in the Sand was the first gay porn film to include credits, to achieve crossover success, to be reviewed by Variety, and one of the earliest porn films, after 1969's Blue Movie by Andy Warhol, to gain mainstream credibility, preceding 1972's Deep Throat by nearly a year. It was promoted with an advertising campaign unprecedented for a pornographic feature, premiered in New York City in 1971 and was an immediate critical and commercial success.
- In December, Nightride by Lee Barton became the first off-Broadway play to discuss a romantic gay relationship.
- The Alice B. Toklas Democratic Club, founded in San Francisco in 1971, was the first gay Democratic club of the United States.

=== 1972 ===
- The first gay Democratic political club, the Alice B. Toklas Democratic Club, was founded by political activist Jim Foster. The first meeting took place in San Francisco on Valentine's day.
- The first gay rights legislation was enacted in America, on March 7, 1972. The East Lansing, Michigan, city council approved by a vote of 4-to-1 an act declaring the city must seek to "employ the best applicant for each vacancy on the basis of his [sic] qualifications for the job and without regard to race, color, creed, national origin, sex or homosexuality."
- The city of Ann Arbor, Michigan took East Lansing's measure (which was limited to government hiring) further in July, prohibiting discrimination against gays by public and private parties not only in employment but in housing and public accommodations, as well – the first community-wide gay rights legislation in the nation. Ann Arbor's act was spurred by the election to the city council in 1972 of Jerry DeGrieck and Nancy Wechsler, who had run on the Human Rights Party ticket. Both would come out as gay in 1973.
- In July, Jim Foster became the first openly gay delegate to address a major party presidential nominating convention, the Democratic National Convention, held at the Miami Beach Convention Center in Miami Beach, Florida, on July 10 to July 13.
- Democratic presidential candidate George McGovern endorsed gay rights, the first US presidential candidate in history to do so; as a result, some party stalwarts denounced him.
- In July, William Johnson became the first openly gay person to be ordained in a mainline Protestant denomination, the United Church of Christ.
- Nancy Wechsler and Jerry DeGrieck simultaneously became the first openly lesbian and openly gay male elected officials in the United States. Both were recent graduates of the University of Michigan when they were elected to the Ann Arbor City Council in 1972 as members of the Human Rights Party. They came out at a city council meeting in October 1973 when the Chief of Police was in attendance. An anti-gay attack at a local bar had occurred the night before, which violated the recently passed Human Rights Ordinance, and they wanted to ask the Chief of Police why the police were unaware of the contents of the ordinance.
- Camille Mitchell became the first open lesbian to be awarded custody of her children in a divorce case, although the judge restricted the arrangement by precluding Mitchell's lover from moving in with her and the children.
- Freda Smith became the first openly lesbian minister in the Metropolitan Community Church (she was also their first female minister).
- Madeline Davis became the first openly lesbian delegate elected to a major political convention when she was elected to the Democratic National Convention in Miami, Florida. She addressed the convention in support of the inclusion of a gay rights plank in the Democratic Party platform. In 1972 she also, along with Margaret Small, taught the first course on lesbianism in the United States (Lesbianism 101 at the University at Buffalo.) That year she also wrote and recorded Stonewall Nation, the first gay pride anthem, which was produced on 45 RPM record by the Mattachine Society of the Niagara Frontier.
- Jobriath Boone became the first openly gay rock musician to be signed to a major record label, Elektra Records.
- Australian soap opera Number 96 featured the first openly gay and regular character (played by Joe Hasham) on television anywhere in the world. Hasham's character, Don Finlayson, continued until the show was cancelled in 1978. Both the character and the actor were wildly popular.
- Hawaii became the first state to decriminalize consensual homosexual sex acts between adults, while Delaware became the sixth state in the nation to repeal its sodomy law.
- New York City Mayor John Lindsay issued an anti-bias order protecting city employees from discrimination based on homosexuality. Meanwhile, in San Francisco, the Board of Supervisors banned discrimination based on gender and sexual orientation for both the city and those doing business with the city.
- National Coalition of Gay Organizations called for the repeal of all legislative provisions that restrict the sex of persons entering into a marriage unit and extension of legal benefits of marriage to all persons who cohabit regardless of sex.
- The first gay studies program in the U.S. began at Sacramento State University in California.
- In October, the U.S. Supreme Court declines to hear the appeal of Baker v. Nelson "for want of a substantial federal question" in a state court case where two men challenged Minnesota's refusal to approve their application for a marriage license. It was the first legal challenge for same-sex marriage.
- In October, Maryland became the first U.S. state to pass a statute banning marriage between homosexual couples
- In November, That Certain Summer aired on ABC, the first television screenplay to sensitively explore homosexuality through the story of an American housewife (Hope Lange) losing her husband (Hal Holbrook) to a young artist (Martin Sheen).
- The American Psychiatric Association (APA) voted 13–0 to remove homosexuality from its DSM-II (the official list of psychiatric disorders). The APA also passed a resolution urging an end to all private and public discrimination against homosexuals.
- Beth Chayim Chadashim was founded in 1972 as the first LGBTQ synagogue in the world, and the first LGBTQ synagogue recognized by the Union for Reform Judaism.
- A Quaker group, the Committee of Friends on Bisexuality, issued the "Ithaca Statement on Bisexuality" supporting bisexuals. The Statement, which may have been "the first public declaration of the bisexual movement" and "was certainly the first statement on bisexuality issued by an American religious assembly," appeared in the Quaker Friends Journal and The Advocate in 1972. Today Quakers have varying opinions on LGBTQ people and rights, with some Quaker groups more accepting than others.
- Twin Peaks Tavern became the first gay bar to have clear windows in San Francisco. Prior to this, its windows were blacked out.

=== 1973 ===
- Sally Miller Gearhart became the first open lesbian to obtain a tenure-track faculty position when she was hired by San Francisco State University, where she helped establish one of the first women and gender study programs in the country.
- Lavender Country, an American country music band, released a self-titled album. It was the first known gay-themed album in country music history.
- Jim Morris became the first openly gay bodybuilder to win AAU Mr. America overall, most muscular, best arms, and best chest titles.

=== 1974 ===
- The first lesbian kiss occurred on television, on the British BBC drama Girl, between Alison Steadman and Myra Frances.
- Kathy Kozachenko became the first openly gay or lesbian candidate to win public office in the United States (she won a seat on the Ann Arbor, Michigan, city council). She was elected from the Human Rights Party and replaced Nancy Wechsler, who did not run for re-election.
- Elaine Noble became the first openly gay or lesbian candidate ever elected to a state-level office in America when she was elected to the Massachusetts House of Representatives. She had come out as a lesbian during her campaign.
- In December, Allan Spear, a member of the Minnesota Senate, came out. He served almost thirty years, including nearly a decade as President of the Senate.
- Angela Morley became the first openly transgender person to be nominated for an Academy Award, when she was nominated for one in the category of Best Music, Original Song Score/Adaptation for The Little Prince (1974), a nomination shared with Alan Jay Lerner, Frederick Loewe, and Douglas Gamley.
- In December, the lambda was officially declared the international symbol for gay and lesbian rights by the International Gay Rights Congress in Edinburgh, Scotland.
- The world's first gay softball league was formed in San Francisco in 1974 as the Community Softball League, which eventually included both women's and men's teams. The teams, usually sponsored by gay bars, competed against each other and the San Francisco Police softball team.
- Australian TV series The Box, set in a fictional TV station, introduced two regular gay characters: gay director Lee Whiteman (played by Paul Karo) and lesbian journalist Vicki Stafford (Judy Nunn).

=== 1975 ===
- Minneapolis became the first city in the United States to pass trans-inclusive civil rights protection legislation.
- Clela Rorex clerk in Boulder County, Colorado, issued the first same-sex marriage licenses in the United States, issuing the very first of them to Dave McCord and Dave Zamora, on March 26, 1975. Six same-sex marriages were performed as a result of her giving out licenses, but all of the marriages were overturned later that year.
- A group of twelve women became the first group of women in Japan to publicly identify as lesbians, publishing one issue of a magazine called Subarashi Onna (Wonderful Women).
- In September, the South Australian government was the first government in Australia to decriminalise male homosexuality.

=== 1976 ===
- In 1976 the first case in the United States which found that post-operative transsexuals could marry in their post-operative sex was decided. It was the New Jersey case M.T. v. J.T., 140 N.J. Super. 77, 355 A.2d 204, cert. denied 71 N.J. 345 (1976). Here the court expressly considered the English Corbett v. Corbett decision, but rejected its reasoning.
- Tom Gallagher became the first United States Foreign Service officer to come out as gay; he quit the Foreign Service after that, as he would have been unable to obtain a security clearance.
- Patricia Nell Warren's third novel, The Fancy Dancer (1976) was the first bestseller to portray a gay priest and to explore gay life in a small town.
- The Bob Newhart Show's S5E3, Some Of My Best Friends Are... (1976) was the first TV show with a gay character, played by Howard Hessman, a new member of[Dr. Hartley's group therapy.
- Australian Capital Territory (ACT) was the second state or territory in Australia to decriminalise male homosexuality. The bill had been drafted before South Australia in 1975, but as the ACT did not have self-governance at the time, Canberra relied on the federal government to pass the law.

=== 1977 ===
- On March 26, Frank Kameny and a dozen other members of the gay and lesbian community, under the leadership of the then-National Gay Task Force, briefed then-Public Liaison Midge Costanza on much-needed changes in federal laws and policies. This was the first time that gay rights were officially discussed at the White House.
- Anne Holmes became the first openly lesbian minister ordained by the United Church of Christ.
- Ellen Barrett became the first openly lesbian priest ordained by the Episcopal Church of the United States (serving the Diocese of New York).
- The first lesbian mystery novel in America was published: Angel Dance, by Mary F. Beal.
- Shakuntala Devi published the first study of homosexuality in India.
- The TV show Soap features an openly gay character, Jodie Dallas (played by Billy Crystal.)
- San Francisco hosted the world's first gay film festival in 1977.
- Peter Adair, Nancy Adair and other members of the Mariposa Film Group premiered the groundbreaking documentary on coming out, Word Is Out: Stories of Some of Our Lives, at the Castro Theatre in 1977. The film was the first feature-length documentary on gay identity by gay and lesbian filmmakers.
- Beth Chayim Chadashim became the first LGBT synagogue to own its own building.
- Gaysweek was founded as the first mainstream gay publication published by an African-American (Alan Bell).

=== 1978 ===
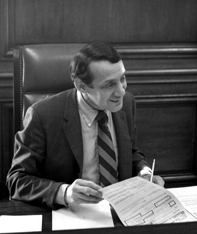
Harvey Milk in 1978. Milk was the first openly gay elected politician in California.

- Harvey Milk became the first openly gay or lesbian candidate elected to political office in California, and the seventh openly gay/lesbian elected official nationally (the third man to be openly gay at time of his election)
- Allen Bennett became the first openly gay rabbi in the United States in 1978.
- Samois, the first lesbian S&M group in the United States, was founded.
- Robin Tyler became the first out lesbian on U.S. national television, appearing on a Showtime comedy special hosted by Phyllis Diller. The same year she released her comedy album, Always a Bridesmaid, Never a Groom, the first comedy album by an out lesbian.
- Gilbert Baker raised the first Rainbow Flag at San Francisco Pride on June 25, 1978.
- Elizabeth Ettorre completed the first Ph.D. on lesbians (The Sociology of lesbianism: female "deviance" and female sexuality) in the UK at the London School of Economics.
- The San Francisco Lesbian/Gay Freedom Band was founded by Jon Reed Sims in 1978 as the San Francisco Gay Freedom Day Marching Band and Twirling Corp. Upon its founding in 1978, it became the first openly gay musical group in the world.
- San Francisco became the first city in America to have a recruitment drive for gay police officers, bringing in over 350 applications.

=== 1979 ===
- Stephen Lachs became the first openly gay judge appointed in the United States and as such is thought to be the first openly gay judge appointed anywhere in the world.
- The first National March on Washington for Lesbian and Gay Rights was held in Washington, D.C., on October 14, 1979.
- The Sisters of Perpetual Indulgence begins in San Francisco on the Saturday before Easter Sunday with three men in nuns' habits cadged from an Iowa City convent, becoming the first house of Sisters in a movement that now features over 50 houses in 12 countries, over 40 in North America.
- The Radical Faeries began with the first gathering on the grounds of a Hindu ashram in the Arizona desert.
- Esta Noche, a gay bar located at 3079 16th & Mission Street in San Francisco, was the first gay Latino bar in San Francisco, and first opened in 1979.
- Grady Quinn and Randy Rohl became the first known gay couple to attend a high school prom when they attended the Lincoln High School prom in Sioux Falls, South Dakota, on May 23, 1979.
- When Megan Went Away (1979), a picture book written by Jane Severance and illustrated by Tea Schook, is regarded as the first picture book to include LGBT characters, and specifically the first to feature lesbian characters, although that distinction is sometimes erroneously bestowed upon Lesléa Newman's Heather Has Two Mommies (1989).

=== 1970s (year unknown) ===
- Angela Douglas founded TAO (Transsexual/Transvestite Action Organization), which published the Moonshadow and Mirage newsletters. TAO moved to Miami in 1972, where it came to include several Puerto Rican and Cuban members, and soon grew into the first international transgender community organization.

== 1980s ==
=== 1980 ===
- Lionel Blue became the first British rabbi to come out as gay.
- Becoming Visible: The First Black Lesbian Conference was held at the Women's Building, from October 17 to 19, 1980. It has been credited as the first conference for African-American lesbian women.
- The Socialist Party USA nominated an openly gay man, David McReynolds, in 1980. This was the first openly gay U.S. presidential candidate.
- The Australian state of Victoria decriminalised male homosexuality on 23 December.

=== 1981 ===
- Mary C. Morgan became the first openly gay or lesbian judge when she was appointed by California Governor Jerry Brown to the San Francisco Municipal Court.
- Ien Dales became the first lesbian member of the Cabinet of the Netherlands
- Tennis player Billie Jean King became the first prominent professional athlete to come out as a lesbian, when her relationship with her secretary Marilyn Barnett became public in a May 1981 "palimony" lawsuit filed by Barnett. Due to this she lost all of her endorsements.
- Randy Shilts was hired as a national correspondent by the San Francisco Chronicle, becoming "the first openly gay reporter with a gay 'beat' in the American mainstream press."
- A Sergeant of the New York City Police Department (Charles H. Cochrane) came out as gay during a city council hearing. This made him the first New York City Police Department member to publicly announce his homosexuality.
- The first bisexual group in the United Kingdom, London Bisexual Group, was founded.

=== 1982 ===
- Chris Dickerson became the first openly gay professional bodybuilder to win the Mr. Olympia title.
- New York City police sergeant Charles H. Cochrane and former Fairview, New Jersey sergeant Sam Ciccone formed the first group targeted at the needs of gay members of law enforcement, the Gay Officers Action League (GOAL).
- The Australian state of New South Wales passes anti-discrimination laws for homosexuality. While one could not lose their job, they could still be jailed.

=== 1983 ===
- Gerry Studds became the first openly gay member of the United States House of Representatives, after he admitted a past relationship with a page when confronted in Congress.
- Sally Ride first went into space this year. In 2012, she died, and her obituary revealed that Ride's partner of 27 years was a woman, Tam O'Shaughnessy, a professor emerita of school psychology at San Diego State University and childhood friend, who met Ride when both were aspiring tennis players. Ride had also previously been married to a man. Ride was thus the first and only known LGBT astronaut (until 2019).
- David Scondras was the first openly gay official elected to the Boston City Council.
- BiPOL, the first and oldest bisexual political organization, was founded in San Francisco by bisexual activists Autumn Courtney, Lani Kaʻahumanu, Arlene Krantz, David Lourea, Bill Mack, Alan Rockway, and Maggi Rubenstein.
- Governor Jerry Brown appointed Herb Donaldson as the first openly gay male municipal court judge in the State of California in 1983.
- Kitty Tsui became the first known Chinese American lesbian to publish a book (Words of a Woman who Breathes Fire).
- Northern Territory became the third Australian jurisdiction to decriminalise male homosexuality as well as the only jurisdiction to do so without a grassroots campaign.
- Anita Cornwell wrote the first published collection of essays by an African-American lesbian, Black Lesbian in White America.

=== 1984 ===
- Chris Smith became the first openly gay MP in the United Kingdom.
- Reconstructionist Judaism became the first Jewish denomination to allow openly lesbian and gay rabbis and cantors.
- On Our Backs, the first women-run erotica magazine and the first magazine to feature lesbian erotica for a lesbian audience in the United States, was first published in 1984 by Debi Sundahl and Myrna Elana, with the contributions of Susie Bright, Nan Kinney, Honey Lee Cottrell, Dawn Lewis, Happy Hyder, Tee Corinne, Jewelle Gomez, Judith Stein, Joan Nestle, and Patrick Califia.
- BiPOL sponsored the first bisexual rights rally, outside the Democratic National Convention in San Francisco. The rally featured nine speakers from civil rights groups allied with the bisexual movement.
- New South Wales became the fourth Australian jurisdiction to decriminalise male homosexuality (even though Sydney had the largest gay community and held the Sydney Mardi Gras).

=== 1985 ===
- Liverpool-based soap opera, Brookside, featured the first openly gay character on a British TV series.
- Terry Sweeney became Saturday Night Live's first openly gay male cast member; Sweeney was "out" prior to being hired as a cast member.
- Dmitri Belser and Thomas White became the first openly gay couple to adopt an infant (adoption finalized in 1987).

=== 1986 ===
- Becky Smith and Annie Afleck became the first openly lesbian couple in America granted legal joint adoption of a child.
- Elsa, I Come with My Songs: The Autobiography of Elsa Gidlow was the first lesbian autobiography published where the author does not employ a pseudonym.
- Hill Street Blues featured the first lesbian recurring character on a major network; the character was a police officer called Kate McBride, played by Lindsay Crouse.

=== 1987 ===
- Barney Frank became the first U.S. congressman to come out as gay of his own volition.
- David Norris became the first openly gay elected senator in the Republic of Ireland.
- A group of 75 bisexuals marched in the 1987 March On Washington For Gay and Lesbian Rights, which was the first nationwide bisexual gathering. The article "The Bisexual Movement: Are We Visible Yet?", by Lani Kaʻahumanu, appeared in the official Civil Disobedience Handbook for the March. It was the first article about bisexuals and the emerging bisexual movement to be published in a national lesbian or gay publication.

=== 1988 ===
- Svend Robinson became the first Canadian Member of Parliament to come out.
- Stacy Offner became the first openly lesbian rabbi hired by a mainstream Jewish congregation, Shir Tikvah Congregation of Minneapolis (a Reform Jewish congregation).
- Wallace Swan, of Minneapolis, Minnesota, became the first openly gay member of the United States Electoral College.
- Robert Dover became the first openly gay Olympic athlete when he came out in 1988.

=== 1989 ===
- Denmark became the first country to legally recognize same-sex unions, known as "registered partnership" in Denmark.
- Ien Dales became the first openly lesbian government minister in the Netherlands.
- After 4 failed attempts, Western Australia removed consenting homosexuality from the criminal code. A law enforcing this passed in 1990.

== 1990s ==
=== 1990 ===
- Marcella Di Folco became the world's first openly transgender person to be elected for an administrative role, as municipal Councillor in Bologna, Italy.
- Justin Fashanu – first professional footballer (soccer player) ever to identify himself publicly as gay.
- The oldest national bisexuality organization in the United States, BiNet USA, was founded in 1990. It was originally called the North American Multicultural Bisexual Network (NAMBN), and had its first meeting at the first National Bisexual Conference in America. This first conference was held in San Francisco in 1990, and sponsored by BiPOL. Over 450 people attended from 20 states and 5 countries, and the mayor of San Francisco sent a proclamation "commending the bisexual rights community for its leadership in the cause of social justice," and declaring June 23, 1990 Bisexual Pride Day.

=== 1991 ===
- Dale McCormick became the first open lesbian elected to a US state Senate (she was elected to the Maine Senate).
- Sherry Harris was elected to the City Council in Seattle, Washington, making her the first openly lesbian African-American elected official.
- The first lesbian kiss on US television occurred; it was on L.A. Law between the fictional characters of C.J. Lamb (played by Amanda Donohoe) and Abby (Michele Greene).
- The first Southern Comfort Conference was held. The Southern Comfort Conference is a major transgender conference that takes place annually in Atlanta, Georgia. It is the largest, most famous, and pre-eminent such conference in the United States.
- The Chicago Gay and Lesbian Hall of Fame was created in June 1991. The hall of fame is the first "municipal institution of its kind in the United States, and possibly in the world."
- Connie Norman became the first gay rights activist to host a daily talk show about gay issues on a commercial Los Angeles-area station.
- After a change of government law, Queensland decriminalised male homosexuality.
- Kent Carlsson becomes the first openly gay person elected to Swedish parliament.

=== 1992 ===
- Elton John came out to Rolling Stone magazine.
- Althea Garrison was elected as the first transgender state legislator in America, and served one term in the Massachusetts House of Representatives; however, it was not publicly known she was transgender when she was elected.
- The first Dyke March (a march for lesbians and their straight female allies, planned by the Lesbian Avengers) was held in Washington, D.C., with 20,000 women marching.
- The Triangle Ball was held; it was the first inaugural ball in America to ever be held in honor of gays and lesbians.
- Rand Hoch became Florida's first openly LGBT judge.
- Deb Price's debut column in The Detroit News in 1992 was the first syndicated national column in American mainstream media that spoke about gay life.

=== 1993 ===
- Roberta Achtenberg became the first openly gay or lesbian person to be nominated by the president and confirmed by the U.S. Senate when she was appointed to the position of Assistant Secretary for Fair Housing and Equal Opportunity by President Bill Clinton.
- Lea DeLaria was "the first openly gay comic to break the late-night talk-show barrier" with her 1993 appearance on The Arsenio Hall Show.
- In December 1993 Lea DeLaria hosted Comedy Central's Out There, the first all-gay stand-up comedy special.

=== 1994 ===
- Deborah Batts became the first openly gay or lesbian United States federal judge (United States District Court for the Southern District of New York)
- Liverpool-based soap opera, Brookside, broadcast the UK's first pre-watershed lesbian kiss (the first on UK television was in 1974, in Girl).
- The Gay Asian Pacific Alliance and Asian Pacific Sister joined the Chinese New Year Parade in San Francisco, which was the first time that queer Asian American communities had attended in a publicly ethnic activity.
- Steve Gunderson was outed as gay on the House floor by representative Bob Dornan (R-CA) during a debate over federal funding for gay-friendly curricula, making him one of the first openly gay members of the U.S. Congress and the first openly gay U.S. Republican representative.
- The broadcast of Pedro Zamora and Sean Sasser's commitment ceremony in 1994, in which they exchanged vows, was the first such same-sex ceremony in television history and is considered a landmark in the history of the medium.

=== 1995 ===
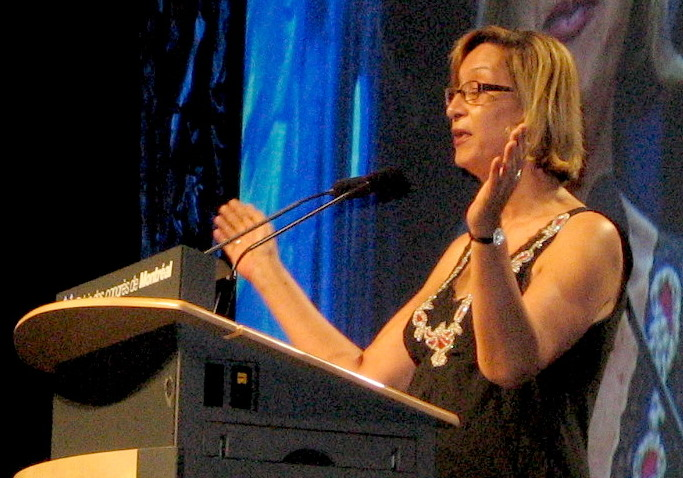
Georgina Beyer

- Georgina Beyer became the world's first transgender mayor (Carterton District, New Zealand)
- Rachel Maddow became the first openly gay or lesbian American to win an international Rhodes Scholarship.
- Harvey Brownstone became the first openly gay or lesbian judge appointed in Canada (Ontario Court of Justice)
- Ian Roberts became the first high-profile Australian sports person and first rugby footballer in the world to come out to the public as gay.
- Maria Zoe Dunning became the first and only openly gay person allowed to remain on active duty in the U.S. military prior to the end of the Don't Ask, Don't Tell policy.
- The International Bear Brotherhood Flag was designed in 1995 by Craig Byrnes. "Bear" is an affectionate gay slang term for those in the bear communities, a subculture in the gay male community with its own events, codes, and culture-specific identity.
- Kings Cross Steelers, the world's first gay rugby club, was founded.
- Rabbi Margaret Wenig's essay "Truly Welcoming Lesbian and Gay Jews" was published in The Jewish Condition: Essays on Contemporary Judaism Honoring Rabbi Alexander M. Schindler; it was the first published argument to the Jewish community on behalf of civil marriage for gay couples.
- Ed Flanagan served as Vermont's State Auditor from 1993 through 2001, becoming the first openly gay, statewide-elected official in the United States when he came out in 1995, before his 1996 re-election.

=== 1996 ===
- Michael Kirby became the first openly gay judge of the High Court of Australia (He was appointed February 1996, and named his male partner in his 1999 entry in "Who's Who in Australia")
- Joseph H. Gale became the first openly gay United States Federal judge (the United States Tax Court; he was appointed in February)
- Bob Brown became the first openly gay member of the Parliament of Australia (elected in March, his term started in July)
- South Africa became the first country to explicitly prohibit discrimination based on sexual orientation in its constitution.
- The first lesbian wedding on television occurred, held for fictional characters Carol (played by Jane Sibbett) and Susan (played by Jessica Hecht) on the TV show Friends.
- The first openly gay speaker at a Republican National Convention was Log Cabin Republicans member Steve Fong of California in 1996.
- Reverend Erin Swenson – the first openly transgender mainstream (Presbyterian, USA) minister to have her ordination upheld after a gender transition from male to female.
- Muhsin Hendricks came out as gay, becoming the first openly queer imam.
- Muffin Spencer-Devlin became the first LPGA player to come out as gay.

=== 1997 ===
- Ellen DeGeneres was the star of the situation comedy Ellen. In 1997, she came out as a lesbian on The Oprah Winfrey Show. Shortly afterwards, still in 1997, her TV series character Ellen Morgan also came out as gay in the fourth-season episode "The Puppy Episode", thus making DeGeneres the first openly lesbian actress to play an openly lesbian character on television.
- Angela Eagle, MP for Wallasey (Merseyside), became Britain's first openly lesbian Member of Parliament.
- Evelyn Mantilla came out as America's first openly bisexual state official in 1997 in Connecticut.
- Patria Jiménez became the first openly gay person to win a position in the Mexican Congress, doing so for the Party of the Democratic Revolution.
- Jay Fisette became the first openly gay person elected to public office in Virginia.
- The Gay and Lesbian Medical Association launched the Journal of the Gay and Lesbian Medical Association, the world's first peer-reviewed, multi-disciplinary journal dedicated to LGBT health.
- Paul Oscar became the first openly gay singer in the Eurovision Song Contest in Dublin.
- Tasmania became the final jurisdiction of Australia to decriminalise male homosexuality. Gay activists had taken the matter to the High Court, and Tasmania's Upper House passed the law reform by one vote.

=== 1998 ===
- Jackie Biskupski became the first openly gay elected official in Utah after she won a seat in the Utah House of Representatives.
- Dana International became the first openly transgender person to win the Eurovision Song Contest.
- Glen Murray became the first out gay man to be elected mayor of a major city: Winnipeg (population ca. 600,000 in 2001), the capital of Manitoba, in Canada.
- Gender identity was added to the mission of Parents and Friends of Lesbians and Gays (PFLAG) after a vote at their annual meeting in San Francisco. PFLAG became the first national LGBT organization to officially adopt a transgender-inclusion policy for its work.
- Tammy Baldwin became the first openly gay or lesbian non-incumbent ever elected to United States Congress, and the first open lesbian ever elected to Congress, winning Wisconsin's 2nd congressional district seat over Josephine Musser.
- The first bisexual pride flag was unveiled on Dec 5th, 1998.
- Julie Hesmondhalgh first began to play Hayley Anne Patterson, British TV's first transgender character (in Coronation Street).
- BiNet USA hosted the First National Institute on Bisexuality and HIV/AIDS.

=== 1999 ===
- Georgina Beyer became the first transgender Member of Parliament (elected in 27 November New Zealand general election, representing the Wairarapa electorate)
- Stephen Brady and his partner Peter Stephens became the world's first openly gay ambassadorial couple; accompanied by Stephens, Brady presented his credentials as Australian Ambassador to Denmark, to Queen Margrethe II on 15 February 1999
- Water Rats shows two female lovers in bed together. This happened approximately four years before anything similar was shown on U.S. television.
- James Hormel became the first openly gay United States ambassador (sworn in June 1999)
- Will Hayes became the first openly gay Hong Kong ambassador (sworn in June 1999)
- In 1999, the first Celebrate Bisexuality Day was organized by Michael Page, Gigi Raven Wilbur, and Wendy Curry.

== 2000s ==
=== 2000 ===
- The transgender pride flag, created by transgender woman Monica Helms, was first shown, at a pride parade in Phoenix, Arizona.
- Civil unions were legalized in Vermont, the first U.S. state to do so. Carolyn Conrad and Kathleen Peterson became the first couple in the United States to enter a civil union.
- Hillary Clinton became the first First Lady to march in an LGBT pride parade.
- Jim Kolbe became the first openly gay person to address the Republican National Convention, although his speech did not address gay rights.

=== 2001 ===
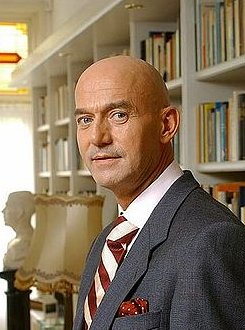
Pim Fortuyn

- Rachel Maddow became the first openly lesbian Rhodes Scholar.
- Libby Davies became the first female Canadian Member of Parliament to come out as a member of the LGBT community.
- Klaus Wowereit became the first openly gay elected mayor of Berlin.
- Bertrand Delanoë became the first openly gay person to be elected mayor of Paris.
- The Netherlands became the first country to legally recognize same-sex marriage.
- The UK's first ever televised gay wedding was screened live on air from Liverpool's Albert Dock on ITV's This Morning.
- San Francisco became the first city in America to cover sex reassignment surgeries for government employees.
- The first memorial in the United States honoring LGBT veterans was dedicated in Desert Memorial Park, Cathedral City, California.
- Helene Faasen and Anne-Marie Thus, from the Netherlands, became the first two women in the world to legally marry.
- Pink Triangle Park was dedicated; it became the first permanent, free-standing memorial in America dedicated to the thousands of persecuted homosexuals during the Holocaust of World War II.

=== 2002 ===
- Pim Fortuyn became the first openly gay candidate for Prime Minister of the Netherlands. He was assassinated nine days before election day, his sexual orientation not being a motive.
- Parents and Friends of Lesbians and Gays (PFLAG) established its Transgender Network, also known as TNET, as its first official "Special Affiliate", recognized with the same privileges and responsibilities as its regular chapters.
- Per-Kristian Foss, the Minister of finance, became the acting prime minister of Norway, thus being the first openly homosexual head of government in modern times. Jóhanna Sigurðardóttir, Prime Minister of Iceland, later became the first openly homosexual head of government, on an elected basis, in 2009.
- In 2002 at Hebrew Union College-Jewish Institute of Religion in New York the Reform rabbi Margaret Wenig organized the first school-wide seminar at any rabbinical school which addressed the psychological, legal, and religious issues affecting people who are intersex or transgender.

=== 2003 ===
- Ang Ladlad was founded in September as the first solely LGBT political party
- David Cicilline became the first openly gay mayor of a U.S. state capital (Providence, Rhode Island)
- Gene Robinson became the first openly gay person to be ordained bishop in a major Christian denomination
- On 1 November 2003, Taiwan Pride, the first gay pride parade in the Chinese-speaking world, was held in Taipei, with over 1,000 people attending. It has taken place annually since then, but still, many participants wear masks to hide their identity because homosexuality remains a social taboo in Taiwan. However, the 2010 parade attracted 30,000 attendees and increasing media and political attention, highlighting the growing rate of acceptance in Taiwan. Since 2010, there has also been a pride parade in Kaohsiung, which attracted over 2,000 people.
- In 2003 Reuben Zellman became the first openly transgender person accepted to the Hebrew Union College-Jewish Institute of Religion, where he was ordained in 2010.
- In 2003 the Reform rabbi Margaret Wenig organized the first school-wide seminar at the Reconstructionist Rabbinical College which addressed the psychological, legal, and religious issues affecting people who are intersex or transgender.
- Jennifer Finney Boylan's autobiography, She's Not There: A Life in Two Genders, was the first book by an openly transgender American to become a bestseller.
- Patrick Harvie became the first openly bisexual Member of the Scottish Parliament.
- Buffy the Vampire Slayer showed girlfriends Willow Rosenberg and Tara Maclay in bed together, considered the first scene of its kind for a broadcast network series. The first lesbian sex scene in broadcast TV history also occurred on the show.

=== 2004 ===
- The L Word featured television's first ensemble cast of lesbian characters.
- Nicole LeFavour became the first openly gay member of the Idaho Legislature, first as a Representative and then as a Senator.
- Bill Siksay became the first openly gay Canadian elected to a first term as Member of Parliament
- Oras Tynkkynen became the first openly gay member of parliament in Finland. Initially appointed as a replacement for an MP who stepped down, was elected to his seat in 2007.
- The first all-transgender performance of The Vagina Monologues was held. The monologues were read by eighteen notable transgender women, and a new monologue revolving around the experiences and struggles of transgender women was included.
- Del Martin and Phyllis Lyon became the first same-sex couple to be legally married in the United States, when San Francisco mayor Gavin Newsom allowed city hall to grant marriage licenses to same-sex couples. However, all same-sex marriages done in 2004 in California were annulled. After the California Supreme Court decision in 2008 that granted same-sex couples in California the right to marry, Del Martin and Phyllis Lyon remarried, and were again the first same-sex couple in the state to marry. Later in 2008 Prop 8 illegalized same-sex marriage in California, but the marriages that occurred between the California Supreme Court decision legalizing same-sex marriage and the approval of Prop 8 illegalizing it are still considered valid, including the marriage of Del Martin and Phyllis Lyon. However, Del Martin died in 2008.
- Same-sex marriage was legalized in the state of Massachusetts. Marcia Hams and Sue Shepard became the first same-sex couple to marry in the state.
- Same-sex marriage was legalized in part of Oregon, as after researching the issue and getting two legal opinions, the commissioners decided Oregon's Constitution would not allow them to discriminate against same-sex couples. The Chairwoman of the Board of Commissioners ordered the clerk to begin issuing marriage licenses. Mary Li and her partner Becky Kennedy became the first same-sex couple to marry in the state. Later that year, Oregon voters passed a constitutional amendment defining marriage as involving one man and one woman. The same-sex marriages from 2004 were ruled void by the Oregon Supreme Court.
- James McGreevey, then governor of New Jersey, came out as gay, thus becoming the first openly gay state governor in the United States. He resigned soon after.
- Bisi Alimi became the first Nigerian to come out as gay on television.
- Luna, by Julie Anne Peters, was the first young-adult novel with a transgender character to be released by a mainstream publisher.
- The first Trans pride march was held in San Francisco in 2004.

=== 2005 ===
- Same-sex marriage was legalized in Canada
- Bonnie Bleskachek became the first openly lesbian fire chief of a major metropolitan area in the United States (Minneapolis).
- Liverpool Register Office became the UK's first to include a gay couple on the front cover of civil ceremony promotional material
- Transgender activist Pauline Park became the first openly transgender person chosen to be grand marshal of the New York City Pride March, the oldest and largest LGBT pride event in the United States.
- The Simpsons became the first cartoon series to dedicate an entire episode to the topic of same-sex marriage.
- The first European Transgender Council meeting was held in Vienna.
- Eli Cohen became the first openly gay man to be ordained a rabbi of the Jewish Renewal movement.
- Andrew Goldstein was the first American male team-sport professional athlete to be openly gay during his playing career. He came out publicly in 2003 and was drafted by his hometown team, the Boston Cannons of Major League Lacrosse, in 2005. Goldstein played goaltender for the Long Island Lizards from 2005 to 2007, appearing in two games in 2006.

=== 2006 ===
- Vladimir Luxuria became the first transgender person elected as Deputy to the Italian Parliament.

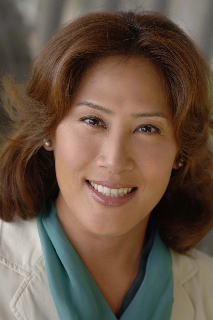
In 2006 Kim Coco Iwamoto became the first transgender official to win statewide office in Hawaii.

- Chaya Gusfield and Lori Klein, both ordained in America, became the first openly lesbian rabbis ordained by the Jewish Renewal movement.
- Since 2006, in the United Kingdom a pink version of the Union Jack is sometimes used by the British LGBT community.
- In 2006, Kim Coco Iwamoto was elected as a member of the Hawaii Board of Education, making her at that time the highest-ranking openly transgender elected official in the United States, as well as the first openly transgender official to win statewide office.
- Elliot Kukla, who came out as transgender six months before his ordination in 2006, was the first openly transgender person to be ordained by the Hebrew Union College-Jewish Institute of Religion.
- Arizona became the first state to reject a ban on same-sex marriage (it would have banned domestic partnerships and civil unions as well) although it did accept one in 2008.
- Patricia Todd became Alabama's first openly gay public official when she was elected in 2006.
- Bernárd J. Lynch became the first Catholic priest in the world to undertake a civil partnership in 2006 in Ireland (he had previously had his relationship blessed in a ceremony in 1998 by an American Cistercian monk). He was subsequently expelled from his religious order in 2011 (since Catholic priests are required to retain celibacy), and went on to legally wed his husband in 2016.
- Elisebeht Markström comes out, making her the first openly lesbian member of Swedish parliament.

=== 2007 ===
- Jenny Bailey became the first openly transgender mayor in the United Kingdom.
- Theresa Sparks became the first openly transgender police commissioner (San Francisco). In 2003 Theresa Sparks had been the first openly transgender woman ever named "Woman of the Year" by the California State Assembly.
- Jalda Rebling, a German woman born in the Netherlands, became the first openly lesbian cantor ordained by the Jewish Renewal movement.
- From 2007 to 2008 actress Candis Cayne played Carmelita Rainer, a transgender woman having an affair with married New York Attorney General Patrick Darling (played by William Baldwin), on the ABC prime time drama Dirty Sexy Money. The role made Cayne the first openly transgender actress to play a recurring transgender character in prime time.
- Joy Ladin became the first openly transgender professor at an Orthodox Jewish institution (Stern College for Women of Yeshiva University).
- On 29 November, the first foreign gay wedding was held in Hanoi, Vietnam, between a Japanese and an Irish national. The wedding raised much attention in the gay and lesbian community in Vietnam.
- Amaranta Gómez Regalado (for México Posible) became the first transsexual person to appear in the Mexican Congress.
- Ellen DeGeneres became the first open lesbian to host the Academy Awards.
- Ventura Place in Studio City was renamed Dr. Betty Berzon Place in her honor, making it the first street ever officially dedicated to a known lesbian in California.

=== 2008 ===
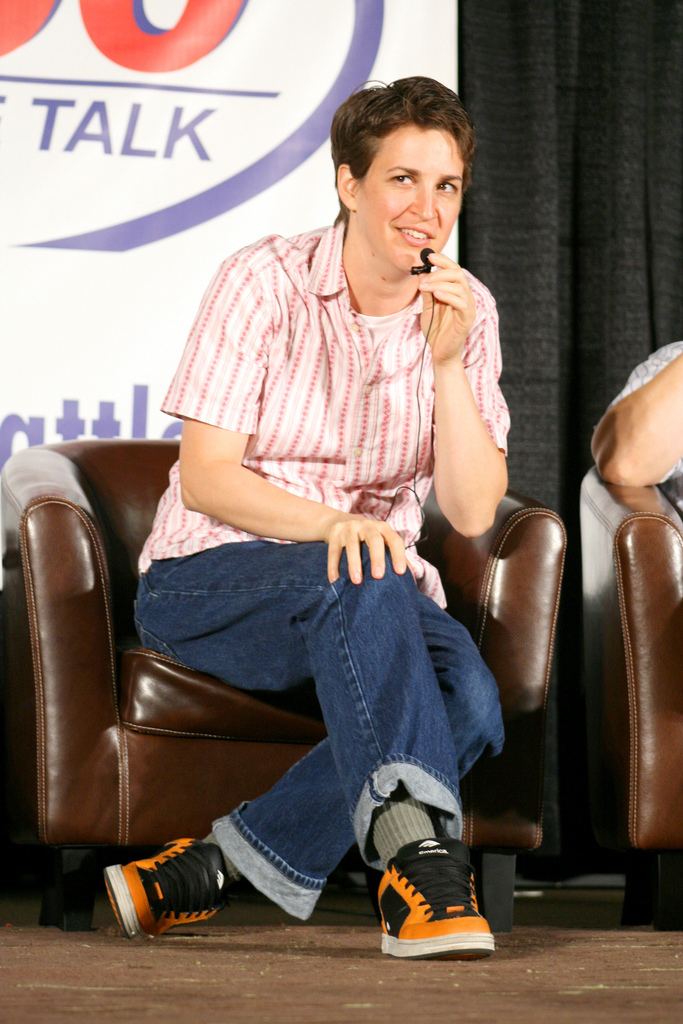
Rachel Maddow in August 2008

- Rachel Maddow became the first openly gay or lesbian anchor of a major prime-time news program in the United States, hosting The Rachel Maddow Show on U.S. cable network MSNBC.
- Sam Adams was elected as the first openly gay mayor of Portland, Oregon, which made him the first openly gay mayor of a top-30 U.S. city.
- Matthew Mitcham became the first openly gay athlete to win an Olympic gold medal.
- Tony Briffa was elected to public office as City Councillor, the first openly intersex person to be so elected.
- Silverton, Oregon elected Stu Rasmussen as the first openly transgender mayor in America.
- Angie Zapata, a transgender woman, was murdered in Greeley, Colorado. Allen Andrade was convicted of first-degree murder and committing a bias-motivated crime, because he killed her after he learned that she was transgender. This case was the first in the nation to get a conviction for a hate crime involving a transgender victim. Angie Zapata's story and murder were featured on Univision's Aquí y Ahora television show on November 1, 2009.
- The first ever U.S. Congressional hearing on discrimination against transgender people in the workplace was held, by the House Subcommittee on Health, Employment, Labor, and Pensions.
- At the request of a lesbian couple (Kitzen and Jeni Branting), the Coquille Indian Tribe on the southern Oregon coast adopted a law recognizing same-sex marriage. Tribal law specialists said the Coquille may be the first tribe to sanction such marriages.
- Same-sex marriage was legalized in Connecticut. Beth Bye and her girlfriend Tracey Wilson became the first same-sex couple to marry in the state.
- Angela Eagle, Member of Parliament (MP) for Wallasey (Merseyside), became the first woman MP to enter a civil partnership.
- Kay Ryan became the first openly lesbian United States Poet Laureate.

=== 2009 ===
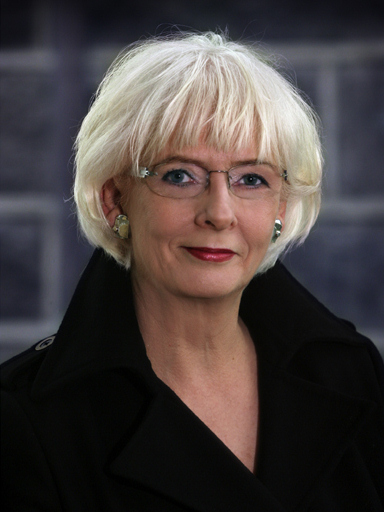
In 2009 Jóhanna Sigurðardóttir became the prime minister of Iceland and thus became the first openly gay head of government in modern times.

- Eva Brunne became the first lesbian bishop in the world and the first bishop of the Church of Sweden to be in a registered same-sex partnership.
- Lesbian and Gay Band Association became the first LGBT-represented contingent to march in a U.S. presidential inaugural parade. The parade on January 20 was in celebration of Barack Obama's incoming administration.
- Jared Polis became the first non-incumbent openly gay man elected to U.S. Congress.
- Jóhanna Sigurðardóttir was elected Prime Minister of Iceland. She became the first openly homosexual head of government in modern times on an elected basis (in contrast to Per-Kristian Foss, who was briefly acting Prime Minister of Norway in 2002).
- Carol Ann Duffy became the first openly lesbian or gay Poet laureate of the United Kingdom.
- Alejandro Freyre and José María di Bello was the first same-sex marriage in Latin America.
- Gareth Thomas became the first active professional rugby player to come out as gay.
- Annise Parker was elected as the first openly LGBT mayor of Houston, Texas and the first LGBT mayor of a U.S. city with a population over 1,000,000.
- Diego Sanchez became the first openly transgender person to work on Capitol Hill; he was hired as a legislative assistant for Barney Frank. Sanchez was also the first transgender person on the Democratic National Committee's (DNC) Platform Committee in 2008.
- Barbra Casbar Siperstein was nominated and confirmed as an at-large member of the Democratic National Committee, becoming its first openly transgender member.
- Kitzen and Jeni Branting married in the Coquille Indian tribe's Coos Bay plankhouse, a three-year-old meeting hall built in traditional Coquille style with cedar plank walls. They were the first same-sex couple to have their marriage recognized by the tribe, of which Kitzen was a member.
- Same-sex marriage was legalized in Iowa, and Shelley Wolfe and Melisa Keeton became the first lesbian couple (and the second same-sex couple) to marry in Iowa.
- Same-sex marriage was legalized in Vermont, and Claire Williams and Cori Giroux became one of the first same-sex couples to marry in Vermont (others including them married the moment same-sex marriage was legalized).
- Guido Westerwelle became the first openly gay foreign minister and vice chancellor of Germany.
- All My Children featured U.S. daytime TV's first lesbian wedding.
- Simone Bell became the first African-American lesbian elected to serve in a U.S. state legislature.
- In September 2009, Vandy Beth Glenn delivered the first United States Congress testimony (before the House of Representatives) from an openly transgender witness, urging passage of the Employment Non-Discrimination Act.
- In October 2009, LGBT activist Amy Andre was appointed as executive director of the San Francisco Pride Celebration Committee, making her San Francisco Pride's first openly bisexual woman of color executive director.
- Dylan Orr became the first openly transgender presidential appointee in America, when he was appointed as special assistant in the Department of Labor's Office of Disability Employment Policy.
- In 2009, Ron Yosef became the first Israeli Orthodox Rabbi to come out, which he did when appearing in Uvda ("Fact"), Israel's leading investigative television program, in an episode regarding conversion therapies in Israel. Yosef remains in his position as a pulpit Rabbi.
- Siddur Sha'ar Zahav, the first complete prayer book to address the lives and needs of LGBT as well as straight Jews, was published. Sha'ar Zahav is a progressive Reform synagogue in San Francisco.
- Homosexual relations were legalised in India for the first time on July 2, 2009, through the decision of Delhi High Court (which was later overturned by Supreme Court of India in 2013, and later homosexual relations were legalised in 2018 overturning the previous decision).

== 2020s ==
=== 2020 ===
- On 2 January 2020, UK MP Layla Moran revealed in an interview with PinkNews that she is pansexual; she is believed to be the first UK parliamentarian to identify as such.
- Nyla Rose won the AEW Women's World Championship on Dynamite, becoming the first openly transgender woman to win a world championship in a major United States wrestling promotion.
- Rachel Slawson became the first openly bisexual contestant to compete for the Miss USA title.
- President Joe Biden named Pete Buttigieg as his nominee to be Secretary of Transportation, making him the first openly gay cabinet nominee in U.S. history.
- Katie Sowers became the first female and first openly gay offensive assistant in a Super Bowl.
- Pete Buttigieg became the first openly gay candidate to win an American presidential primary or caucus.
- Curdin Orlik became the first athlete in the sport of Schwingen to come out as gay, and also the first openly gay male active in Swiss professional sports.
- Diana Zurco became Argentina's first openly transgender newscaster.
- Sebastian Vega came out as gay, making him the first openly gay professional basketball player in Argentina.
- Camila Prins became the first openly transgender woman to lead the drum section of a top samba school in the Carnival parade in Sao Paulo.
- The Philadelphia Police Academy graduated its first openly transgender officer, Benson Churgai.
- The Pfister Hotel named Nykoli Koslow as its first openly transgender Artist in Residence.
- Chris Mosier became the first openly transgender male athlete to ever compete in an Olympic trial alongside other men; however, he was unable to finish the race due to injury.
- Megan Youngren became the first openly transgender athlete to compete at the Olympic marathon trials in U.S. history.
- Out was released; it was Disney's and Pixar's first short to feature a gay main character and storyline.
- Richard Grenell briefly served as acting director of national intelligence in the Trump administration, making him the first openly gay person to serve in a U.S. cabinet-level position.
- Laura Clellan was appointed as the first openly LGBT Adjutant General of the Colorado National Guard.
- Benson from Kipo and the Age of Wonderbeasts became the first character to have an explicit coming out as gay in an all-ages animation series.
- Stormie Forte became the first openly LGBT woman to serve on the Raleigh City Council.
- Valentina Sampaio became the Sports Illustrated Swimsuit Issue's first openly transgender model in 2020.
- Luz Noceda and Amity Blight of The Owl House became Disney's first animated LGBT female regular characters.
- Karine Jean-Pierre became the first openly gay woman to serve as a vice presidential chief of staff.
- Malcolm Kenyatta, Sam Park, and Robert Garcia became the first openly gay speakers in a keynote slot at a Democratic National Convention.
- On 1 October 2020, Petra De Sutter was sworn in as one of seven deputy prime ministers in the government of Prime Minister Alexander De Croo, becoming Europe's first transgender deputy prime minister, and the most senior trans politician in Europe.
- Following the landslide 2020 New Zealand Election, New Zealand gains the most LGBT parliamentary representatives worldwide. A majority of the new LGBT MPs come from the Green Party.
- Camille Balanche became the first out lesbian to win the UCI Downhill Mountain Biking World Championship.
- In Taiwan, military same-sex couples are married for the first time.
- Sarah McBride became the first transgender state senator elected in America.
- Mondaire Jones and Ritchie Torres became the first openly gay black men elected to Congress. This also made Torres the first openly gay Afro Latino elected to Congress.
- Taylor Small became the first transgender person elected to be a state legislator in Vermont.
- Stephanie Byers became the first Native American transgender person elected to office in America, when she was elected to the Kansas state House of Representatives; she is a member of the Chickasaw Nation. This election also made her the first transgender person elected to the Kansas state legislature.
- Joe Biden became the first president-elect to mention the transgender community in a victory speech.
- Mauree Turner became the first non-binary state legislator elected in the United States.
- Nevada became the first U.S. state to constitutionally protect same-sex marriage. (See: Same-sex marriage in Nevada)
- Christy Holstege became the first openly bisexual mayor in America, as mayor of Palm Springs, California.
- Alex Lee became the California State Assembly's first openly bisexual member.
- The Arctic and Antarctic celebrated the first Polar Pride Day, on 18 November.
- The Christmas House, the first Hallmark movie to prominently feature a same-sex couple, premiered.
- Big Sky premiered, making Jesse James Keitel the first non-binary actor to play a non-binary series regular on primetime television.
- Ryan Fecteau became the first openly-gay person to serve as Speaker of the Maine House of Representatives.
- Sean Patrick Maloney became the first openly gay person to be elected as chair of the Democratic Congressional Campaign Committee.
- The Lesbian and Gay Big Apple Corps became the first LGBT marching band to perform in the Macy's Thanksgiving Day Parade.
- Martin Jenkins was sworn in as the first openly gay Justice of the California Supreme Court.
- Todd Gloria was elected as San Diego's first openly gay mayor.
- Mara Gómez became the first trans footballer to play in a top-flight Argentinian league.
- FaZe Clan's Soleil "Ewok" Wheeler came out as transgender, making him the first transgender male on a T1 esports organization.
- The Christmas Setup became the first LGBT-themed Christmas film broadcast by Lifetime.
- American rugby player Devin Ibanez came out as gay, making him the first openly gay Major League Rugby player.
- Levi Davis came out as bisexual, making him the first professional rugby union player to do so while still playing.
- David Ortiz became the first openly bisexual person elected to serve in Colorado as a legislator.

=== 2021 ===
- Pennsylvania governor Tom Wolf became the first governor in the United States to issue a statement recognizing Bisexual Pride Day.
- Nicholas Yatromanolakis became the first openly gay person to hold a ministerial rank in the government of Greece.
- Pete Buttigieg became the first openly gay non-acting member of the Cabinet of the United States, and the first openly gay person confirmed by the Senate to a Cabinet position.
- Gottmik became the first openly transgender male contestant on RuPaul's Drag Race.
- On February 3, 2021, TJ Osborne came out as gay, making him the first openly gay artist signed to a major country music label.
- Adrian Hanstock was made the temporary Chief Constable of the British Transport Police, making him the first openly gay man to be chief of police of a British police force.
- Tashnuva Anan Shishir became Bangladesh's first openly transgender news anchor.
- Elliot Page became the first openly trans man to appear on the cover of Time magazine.
- Patti Harrison became the first known transgender actor to appear in a Disney animated film, due to voicing the small part of Tail Chief in Raya and the Last Dragon.
- Rachel Levine was confirmed March 24 as U.S. assistant secretary for health, making her the first openly trans person confirmed by the U.S. Senate for a U.S. federal government position.
- Martine Delaney became the first openly transgender woman inducted into the Tasmanian Honour Roll of Women.
- Joe Biden became the first American president to issue a formal presidential proclamation recognizing the International Transgender Day of Visibility.
- Alana Gisele Banks became the first Black openly transgender woman elected to a public school board in the United States.
- Jonathan Bennett and Jaymes Vaughan became the first gay couple to cover the magazine The Knot.
- Leyna Bloom became the first Black and Asian-American transgender model to be featured on the cover of Sports Illustrated Swimsuit Issue
- Colton Underwood came out as gay on April 14, 2021, making him the first openly gay Bachelor lead in the franchise's history.
- Carl Nassib came out as gay on June 21, 2021, making history as the first openly gay active NFL player.
- Canadian Luke Prokop, who was drafted by the Nashville Predators in the 2020 NHL entry draft, became the first active player signed to a National Hockey League contract to come out as gay.
- Kamala Harris became the first sitting American Vice President to participate in an LGBT ride march (the Capital Pride Walk in Washington, D.C.)
- The character of Bia was introduced as the first openly transgender Amazon in DC Comics' Wonder Woman series.
- Ariel Nicholson became the first openly transgender person to be featured on the cover of Vogue.
- In the 2021 Milan municipal election, Monica Romano, a municipal councillor of the Democratic Party, became the first trans woman elected to political office in Milan in 2021.
- Christy Abizaid became the first openly gay director of the National Counterterrorism Center.
- In 2021, at the 2020 Tokyo Olympics, Quinn became the first openly transgender, non-binary athlete to compete at the Olympics, the first to medal, and the first to earn a gold medal.

=== 2022 ===
- In March 2022, the Committee on the Elimination of Discrimination against Women found that laws criminalizing consensual same-sex activity between women are a human rights violation. This case, brought by Rosanna Flamer-Caldera, was the first United Nations case to focus on lesbian and bisexual women.
- Carl Nassib became the first openly gay player in an NFL playoff game on January 15.
- Justine Lindsay became the first openly transgender person to make a National Football League Cheerleading team when she joined the Carolina TopCats.
- Jowelle de Souza became the first openly transgender parliamentarian (specifically a Trinidad and Tobago senator) in the Caribbean.
- Swimmer Lia Thomas became the first openly transgender athlete to win an NCAA Division I national championship in any sport, after winning the women's 500-yard freestyle with a time of 4:33.24.
- Jamie Wallis came out as transgender, becoming the first openly transgender MP in the House of Commons of the United Kingdom.
- Paolo Rondelli became the first openly LGBT head of state when he was elected as one of the joint Captains Regent of San Marino.
- Karine Jean-Pierre became the first openly gay White House Press Secretary.
- Willow Pill became the first openly transgender person to win a regular season of RuPaul's Drag Race in the United States.
- L Morgan Lee became the first openly transgender person nominated for a Tony Award in an acting category; she was nominated for Best Performance by a Featured Actress in a Musical for playing Thought 1 in A Strange Loop.
- Kristin Crowley became the first openly gay (and the first female) chief of the Los Angeles Fire Department.
- Ryan Resch came out while working for the Phoenix Suns, making him the first openly gay person in league history to work basketball operations in an NBA front office.
- Kamala Harris became the first sitting American vice president to speak at an LGBT pride festival (D.C.'s Capital Pride Festival). The first LGBT pride month reception hosted by a sitting American vice president at their residence was also hosted by Harris.
- Ariana DeBose became the first queer woman of color and the first Afro-Latina to win an Oscar for acting, which she won for her role as Anita in the 2021 remake of West Side Story directed by Steven Spielberg.
- Igor Benevenuto became the first FIFA-ranked soccer referee to come out as gay.
- Peter Caruth came out as gay, becoming the first Irish men's international hockey player to do so.
- Nadezhda Karpova became the first openly gay Russian national team athlete.
- Travis Shumake became the first openly gay driver to compete in a national event on the National Hot Rod Association racing circuit.
- Ellia Green became the first Olympian to come out as a trans man.
- Jamie Hunter became the first openly transgender snooker player to win a women's tour ranking event in snooker when she won the U.S. Women's Open.
- Peppa Pig introduced its first same-sex couple, Penny Polar Bear's two mothers, in the episode "Families".
- Bros was released; it was the first gay romantic comedy from a major studio featuring an entirely LGBT principal cast.
- In September 2022, Molly Kearney was announced as the first out non-binary cast member of Saturday Night Live.
- Zander Murray became Scotland's first senior male soccer player to announce he was gay.
- Anthony Bowens became the first openly gay wrestler to be an All Elite Wrestling champion.
- Jesús Ociel Baena Saucedo became the first non-binary Latin American magistrate on 1 October.
- Lucas Krzikalla came out as gay, making him the first openly gay player in Handball-Bundesliga, and the first active male player in a professional team sport in Germany to come out as gay.
- Duda Salabert and Erika Hilton became the first two openly transgender people elected to the National Congress of Brazil, with both of them elected to its Chamber of Deputies.
- Byron Perkins of Hampton University came out as gay, making him the first openly gay football player at any HBCU.
- With the song "Unholy", Kim Petras became the first openly transgender woman to reach number one on the Billboard Hot 100, and Sam Smith became the first openly non-binary person to reach number one on the chart.
- Isaac Humphries came out as gay, which made him the first Australian male basketball player and first player in the National Basketball League to be openly gay.
- Becca Balint became the first openly gay person elected to represent Vermont in Congress.
- Leigh Finke became the first openly transgender person elected to Minnesota's legislature.
- Amy Schneider became the first openly transgender person to compete in, and to win, the Jeopardy! Tournament of Champions.
- Erin Maye Quade and Clare Oumou Verbeten became the first openly LGBT women and first black women elected to the Minnesota state Senate.
- Walt Disney Animation Studios' introduced its first openly LGBT main character, by having an openly gay main character in the film Strange World.
- James Roesener became the first openly transgender man to win election to any state legislature in the United States upon being elected to New Hampshire's 22nd state House District, Ward 8.
- Liish Kozlowski became the first openly non-binary person elected to the Minnesota legislature.
- SJ Howell became the first openly non-binary person elected to the Montana legislature.
- The first LGBT-led Hallmark Channel Christmas movie, The Holiday Sitter, premiered.
- Dani Oliva, a transgender man, became the first openly transgender executive at a major music company, as Venice Music's Vice President of Legal and Business Affairs.
- Petros Levounis was elected as the first openly gay president of the American Psychiatric Association.
- Amir Ohana was elected Speaker of the Knesset on 29 December, becoming the first openly LGBT person in that position in Israeli history.
- Davante Lewis became the first openly LGBTQ person elected to state office in Louisiana.
- Corey Jackson became the first openly gay black person elected to California's state legislature.
- Therese Stewart was confirmed as the first openly lesbian presiding justice on any California appellate court; specifically, she was confirmed as presiding justice of the 1st District Court of Appeal's Division Two.
- Jai Vidal became the first openly gay male wrestler to sign with Impact Wrestling.
- Maura Healey was elected as Massachusetts' first openly gay governor, and America's first openly lesbian governor.
- Eric Sorensen became the first openly gay man to be elected to Congress from Illinois.
- Erick Russell was elected Connecticut state treasurer, and thus became the first openly gay African American elected to a statewide office in the United States.
- Jolanda Jones became the first openly gay black person elected to the Texas state legislature.
- Emira D'Spain became the first openly transgender black woman to model for Victoria's Secret
- Brían Nguyen became the first openly transgender titleholder in the Miss America Organization when she was crowned Miss Greater Derry 2023.
- Matilda Simon, 3rd Baroness Simon of Wythenshawe became the first openly transgender British peer
- The Hebrew Union College – Jewish Institute of Religion for the first time granted a certificate of ordination to a nonbinary candidate.

=== 2023 ===
- Campbell Johnstone revealed in an interview with Hilary Barry on New Zealand television show Seven Sharp that he is gay, making him the first openly gay All Black rugby player.
- Kim Petras (and Sam Smith) won the 2023 Grammy Award for Best Pop Duo/Group Performance for "Unholy", making Petras the first openly transgender artist to win a major-category Grammy Award.
- Hogwarts Legacy introduced the Harry Potter franchise's first transgender character, Sirona Ryan.
- Rikkie Kollé won the Miss Nederland 2023 beauty pageant, becoming the first openly transgender person to win a national beauty pageant.
- Edgars Rinkēvičs became the first openly gay head of state in Latvia and the European Union following his election as a president by the Saeima on 31 May 2023.
- Sylvia Swayne announced her candidacy for the Alabama House of Representatives, becoming the first openly transgender woman to run for public office in Alabama.
- Jesse Ehrenfeld became the first openly gay president of the American Medical Association, being sworn in as such on June 13, 2023.
- Seth Marnin became the first openly transgender judge in New York and the first openly transgender male judge in the United States.
- Danica Roem was elected to the Virginia Senate, becoming the first openly transgender person to be elected to a state senate in the Southern United States.
- Ezra Miller became the first openly nonbinary person to play the lead role in a major superhero franchise film, doing so in The Flash, which was released in 2023.
- The character Lake of the 2023 film Elemental was Pixar's first non-binary character.
- The Seoul High Court decided that the state's health insurer – the National Health Insurance Service – should provide spousal coverage to a same-sex couple. This marked the first time any court recognized the rights of a same-sex couple in South Korea.
- Yosha Iglesias fulfilled the requirements for the Woman International Master title in December, becoming the first openly transgender person to qualify for the title.
- The Olivera Fuentes vs. Peru case was the first reported case of discrimination based on sexual orientation in the Peruvian justice system that reached the Inter-American Court of Human Rights, and its ruling, issued in 2023, was also the first in the entire inter-American system in favor of a complainant for being discriminated against for their sexual orientation by a consumer company.
- The nonbinary division of the Boston Marathon was first included in 2023; it was won by Kae Ravichandran with a time of 2:38:57.
- Toni Atkins became the first openly LGBT person to sign a bill into law in California.
- Kevin Maxen, an assistant strength and conditioning coach for the Jaguars, came out as gay, making him the first openly gay male coach in major American men's professional sports.
- Quinn became the first openly transgender and non-binary footballer at the FIFA World Cup.
- Jeanne Marrazzo was named as the first openly gay director of the National Institutes of Health's National Institute of Allergy and Infectious Diseases (NIAID).
- Hallmark's first lesbian holiday romance, called Friends and Family Christmas, premiered.
- Lío Mehiel became the first openly trans actor to win the Sundance Dramatic Special Jury Award for Best Acting, for his performance in Mutt.
- Laphonza Butler became the first black out lesbian in Congress, the first openly LGBT member of the U.S. Senate from California and its first out black LGBT member, when she was sworn in on October 3, 2023.
- Marina Machete became the first Portuguese openly transgender woman to participate in the Miss Universe contest; she represented Portugal at the Miss Universe 2023 pageant in El Salvador and finished as a top 20 semifinalist, becoming the first openly trans woman to place.
- Stefanos Kasselakis became the first openly gay leader of a major political party in Greece, upon being elected the leader of Syriza.
- Che Flores became the first out nonbinary trans referee in a major professional sports league in the United States (specifically, the NBA).
- Rue Landau became the first openly gay person elected to the Philadelphia City Council.
- On September 17, 2023, Jeff R. Johnson was elected as the first openly gay bishop of the Sierra Pacific Synod.
- On October 1, 2023, the Black Cat Tavern became California Historical Landmark #1063, with a marker designating it as such being unveiled, which made it the first marker for a California Historical Landmark associated with LGBTQ history.
- On November 17, 2023, Luke Prokop became the first openly gay player in the American Hockey League's history, by making his first appearance in a game as a player for the Milwaukee Admirals.
- Surendra Pandey and Maya Gurung became the first gay couple in Nepal to officially register their same-sex marriage.
- Wendy Guevara became the first trans woman to win a reality show in Mexico and Latin America.

=== 2024 ===
- Luanne Peterpaul became the first out lesbian in the New Jersey legislature.
- Huang Jie was elected as the first openly gay member of the Legislative Yuan.
- Stacie Gregory became the first openly LGBTQ+, and the first openly lesbian, police chief of Sausalito, California.
- Colman Domingo became the first American openly gay man to receive an Academy Award nomination for playing a gay character.
- Danica Roem became the first openly transgender person to be elected to and serve in both chambers of a state legislature (specifically, Virginia’s) in U.S. history.
- Gabriel Attal became the first openly gay Prime Minister of France, which also made him the eighth openly LGBT head of government in Europe.
- Asher HaVon became the first openly LGBTQ person to win The Voice.
- At the 2024 Cannes Film Festival, Karla Sofía Gascón won the Best Actress prize, shared jointly with her costars Selena Gomez, Adriana Paz and Zoe Saldaña, making Gascón the first openly trans actor to win a major prize at Cannes.
- The pride flag flew above Los Angeles City Hall for the first time.
- Bailey Anne Kennedy became the first openly transgender woman to be Miss Maryland USA.
- Manvi Madhu Kashyap became India's first openly transgender sub-inspector.
- Nemo, representing Switzerland, became the first non-binary artist to win the Eurovision Song Contest.
- Monica Márquez became the first openly gay Chief Justice of the Colorado Supreme Court.
- Andrew Mortensen, of Texas, became the first openly gay man to officially cycle around the world, which he did non-continuously from 2020 until 2024.
- Nava Mau received an Emmy nomination for supporting actress in a limited or anthology series or movie, making her the first openly trans woman to be nominated for that category of the Primetime Emmys.
- Fenix FC became the first federated football team in Europe with all trans members.

=== 2025 ===
- Katrina Foster became the first openly gay bishop of the Evangelical Lutheran Church in America's Metropolitan New York Synod.
- Tramell Tillman became the first openly gay man to win the Primetime Emmy Award for Outstanding Supporting Actor in a Drama Series, which he won for his role as Seth Milchick in the science fiction series Severance.

=== 2026 ===
- In the 2026 Rajya Sabha elections, lawyer Menaka Guruswamy becomes the first openly LGBTQ+ national member of Parliament in India's history.
- During the 2026 Georgia House of Representatives election, Bella Bautista became the first openly transgender person to win a primary in the state.
- Bentley Hudgins became the first openly transgender person elected to public office in Georgia, representing Georgia's 90th House of Representatives district, and the first openly non-binary lawmaker elected to a sate legislature in the Deep South.
- Sabrina Bruce became the first openly transgender person elected to public office in Fairfax County, Virginia.
- Allison Montgomery became the first openly transgender person to be elected to the Alabama Legislature.
- Chris Pappas was elected as the first openly gay member of the United States Senate.
- Quinnie Perez became the first openly transgender person to be elected to public office in Florida.

== See also ==
- Bisexuality in the United States
- History of homosexuality
- History of lesbianism
- History of cross-dressing
- Intersex people in history
- LGBT history
- List of LGBT firsts by year (2010s)
- Timeline of asexual history
- Timeline of LGBT history
- Timeline of transgender history
- Transgender history

== Bibliography ==
- Gallo, Marcia M. Different Daughters: A History of the Daughters of Bilitis and the Rise of the Lesbian Rights Movement. California: Seal Press, 2007. ISBN 1580052525
- Ochs, Robyn and Rowley, Sarah. Getting Bi: Voices of Bisexuals Around the World, second edition. Massachusetts: Bisexual Resource Center, 2009. ISBN 978-0-9653881-5-3
- Tobin, Kay and Wicker, Randy. The Gay Crusaders. New York: Paperback Library, 1972; Arno, 1975 ISBN 0-405-07374-7
- Stryker, Susan. Transgender History. California: Seal Press, 2008. ISBN 978-1580052245
