= Foundering =

Foundering may refer to:

- Shipwrecking, the sinking of a ship
- Foundered strata, the collapse of rock strata

== See also ==
- Founder (disambiguation)
