= Flounder (disambiguation) =

Flounders are a group of several species of flatfish. Flounder is also a verb meaning to act clumsily.

Flounder may also refer to:

- Flounder, a character in the film The Little Mermaid
- The Flounder (also known as Der Butt), a 1977 novel by Günter Grass
- USS Flounder, a United States Navy submarine
- Nexus 9, a tablet computer codenamed Flounder
- Xi'an JH-7, a Chinese fighter-bomber with NATO reporting name Flounder
- Flounder, a 2023 album by Quinnie

== See also ==
- Floundering, a 1994 film
- Founder
