= Quinnie (name) =

Quinnie is a given name and surname. Notable people with the name include:

- Quinnie (born 2001), professional name of Quinn Barnitt, American musician
- Quinnie Perez (born 1993), American politician and farmworker
- Willie Quinnie (1980–2021), American football player
