= Sonic Frontiers =

2022 video game

- North American cover art
- Developer: Sonic Team
- Publisher: Sega
- Director: Morio Kishimoto
- Producers: Takashi Iizuka; Sachiko Kawamura
- Designer: Jyunpei Ootsu
- Programmer: Hiroki Tokunaga
- Artist: Yoshitaka Miura
- Writers: Ian Flynn; Morio Kishimoto; Jyunpei Ootsu
- Composers: Tomoya Ohtani; Kenichi Tokoi; Takahito Eguchi; Rintaro Soma; Kenji Mizuno; Kanon Oguni; Hiroshi Kawaguchi
- Series: Sonic the Hedgehog
- Platforms: Nintendo Switch; PlayStation 4; PlayStation 5; Windows; Xbox One; Xbox Series X/S; Nintendo Switch 2
- Release: November 8, 2022; Definitive Edition; June 23, 2026
- Genres: Platform, action-adventure
- Mode: Single-player

Sonic Frontiers (Note: Japanese: ソニックフロンティア, Hepburn: Sonikku Furontia) is a 2022 platform game developed by Sonic Team and published by Sega for the Nintendo Switch, PlayStation 4, PlayStation 5, Windows, Xbox One and Xbox Series X/S. Its story follows Sonic the Hedgehog and his friends, who after falling into a wormhole are left stranded in an artificial dimension of the Starfall Islands known as Cyber Space. Sonic escapes the dimension and sets off on a mission to rescue his trapped allies by defeating the islands' "Titans". Combining traditional Sonic the Hedgehog series elements with an open world structure, the gameplay of Frontiers sees the player controlling Sonic through the islands in order to collect the Chaos Emeralds, which are necessary to defeat the Titans. This is accomplished by completing various challenges strewn throughout that test the player through platforming, puzzle solving or combat encounters.

Following the release of Sonic Forces (2017), Sonic Team began exploring approaches for its next game. Takashi Iizuka, head of Sonic Team, wanted Frontiers to be a model for future Sonic titles, as Sonic Adventure (1998) had done. Sonic Team settled on an open-ended design and focused on adapting Sonic's abilities to an open world. Frontiers was announced in December 2021 and released on November 8, 2022. A Nintendo Switch 2 port, with a subtitle Definitive Edition, followed in June 23, 2026, in celebration of the franchise's 35th anniversary.

The game was generally positively received among critics, who praised its visuals, story and soundtrack, but criticized its technical issues that gave the impression of a lack of polish. Reception of the controls and combat in Frontiers was mixed, with the latter being lauded by some for its comprehensiveness and critiqued by others for a sense of repetition and feeling of under-engagement. The game was received more favorably by fans of the series. It was a commercial success, selling five million copies as of 2026.

== Gameplay ==
Sonic engages in combat with robots in the open world, using the new Cyloop ability.

Sonic Frontiers is a 3D platformer and action-adventure game. As Sonic, the player explores the Starfall Islands (which consist of various biomes, including flowery fields, forests, ancient ruins and deserts) to collect the Chaos Emeralds and investigate the islands' relationship to them. Sonic retains his abilities from previous Sonic the Hedgehog games: he runs at high speeds, collects rings, grinds on rails, and homes in on enemies to attack. The player can double jump, sidestep, drop dash, and boost if Sonic has enough energy. New abilities include combat attacks, running alongside walls, and using the Cyloop to create a circle of light around objects and interact with them. The Cyloop can perform different tasks by drawing certain shapes — for example, drawing an infinity symbol or a number 8 will allow Sonic to boost indefinitely for a short time. Sonic also gains the ability to temporarily boost indefinitely upon collecting the maximum number of rings. The player can customize the controls and adjust the game's difficulty along with Sonic's speed, turning, acceleration, and sensitivity, among other things. As they progress, they can also upgrade Sonic's speed, attack, defense, ring capacity, and boost gauge.

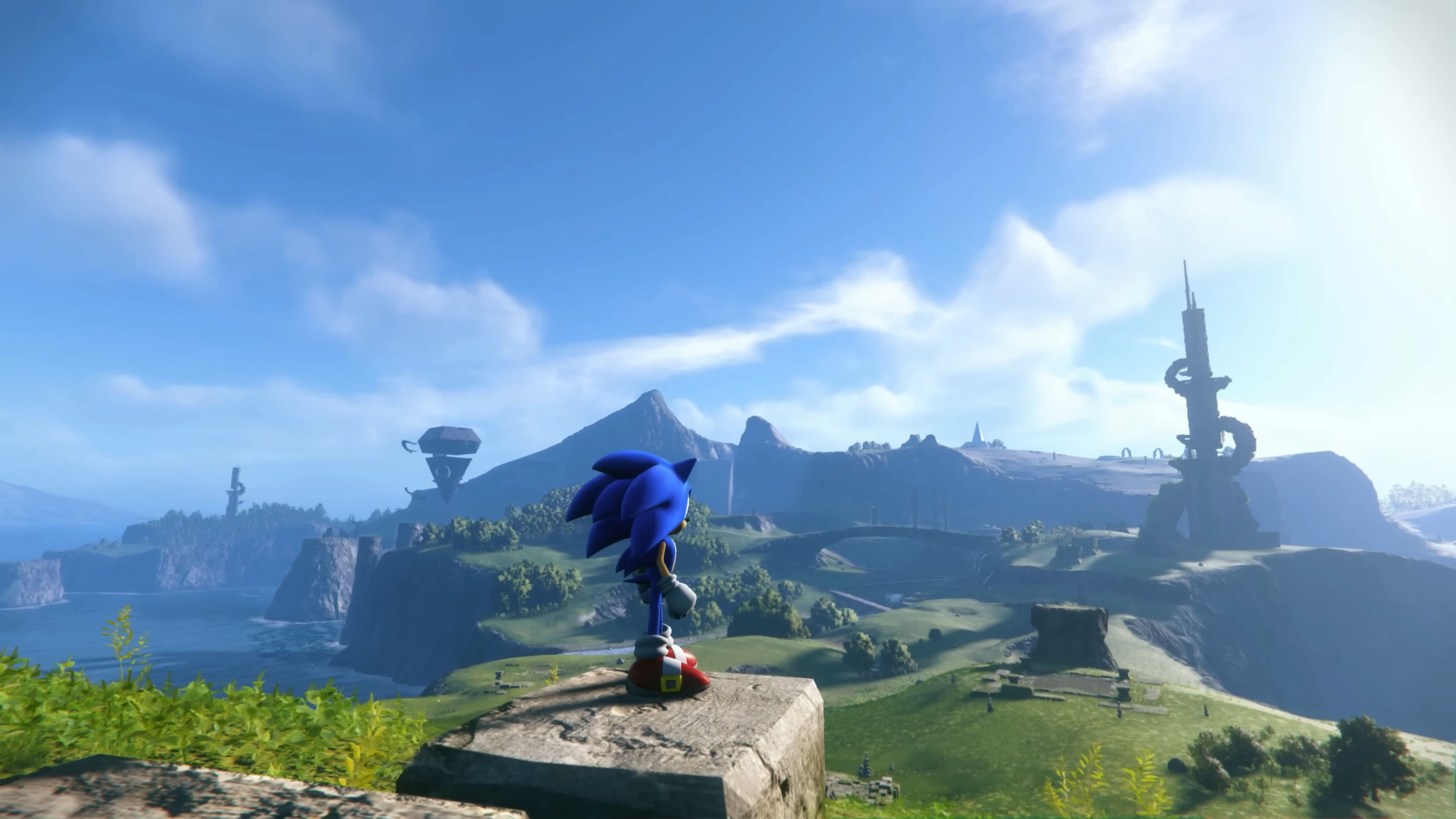
Sonic observing Kronos Island; Sonic Frontiers is the first game in the series to feature open world level design.

The Starfall Islands act as the series's first open world, which writers compared to The Legend of Zelda: Breath of the Wild. (Note: Attributed to multiple references:) The world retains traditional Sonic elements, such as springs, boost pads, and grind rails. The player explores the islands as they solve puzzles, such as orienting statues and speedrunning, to reveal parts of the map and obtain items. (Note: Attributed to multiple sources:) One of Sonic's objectives is to rescue three of his friends — Miles "Tails" Prower, Amy Rose, and Knuckles the Echidna — who are trapped in Cyber Space. This is accomplished by obtaining various collectibles found in the open world. Collectibles include Kocos, which upgrade Sonic's speed and ring capacity; New Kocos, which are larger and upgrade Sonic's boost gauge; Red Seeds of Power and Blue Seeds of Defense, which upgrade Sonic's attack strength and damage reduction, respectively; Sound Memories, which allow new songs to be added to the Jukebox; and Memory Tokens, which are used to trigger cutscenes and conversations with Sonic's friends when they receive them. These either progress the story's plot (occasionally via minigames) or expand their relationships with Sonic by requesting the player to complete side quests. Sonic's friends project themselves as holograms in the real world while trapped, allowing them to interact with and advise Sonic. Action Chain Challenges, which also appear in the open zone, require the player to complete actions and increase their score. Getting an S-rank on all of them allows the player to utilize Sonic's Spin Dash.

The player battles robots throughout the islands, all in various forms; Sonic can dodge and parry attacks and use the Cyloop to make enemies easier to strike. Defeating enemies grants the player experience points that allow the player to purchase additional moves and abilities in combat and the open world. Alongside regular, small enemies, the player battles large "Guardian" bosses. Defeating a Guardian rewards the player with portal gears that, when placed in a portal, allow them to enter Cyber Space.

Each of the 30 Cyber Space levels, which shift between third-person and side-scrolling perspectives, contains three optional objectives, including time attack, collecting rings, and collecting five red rings; completing each objective rewards players with a key required to collect a Chaos Emerald. Big the Cat makes an appearance as a host for a fishing minigame, which is included in set areas of the maps, where Sonic can exchange purple coins found in the overworld to catch fish and other objects that net him "fishing tokens" based on catch quality. The tokens can then be redeemed for items and collectibles. Collecting all seven Chaos Emeralds allows the player to transform into Super Sonic, which is required to battle and defeat the game's major bosses, the Titans. Completing every island-mapping challenge and side story on each island and maxing out Sonic's stats (except for boost), or having the game's difficulty set to Hard or Extreme prior to battling Supreme, reveals a "secret" final boss fight with The End and a post-credits scene.

The game does not feature postgame content, as it resets the player's save file to just before obtaining the final Chaos Emerald, but defeating the End unlocks a boss rush mode called Battle Rush, a Cyber Space Challenge mode, and an Arcade Mode for Cyber Space stages. It also unlocks New Game +, which resets the player's save file but carries over a player's stats (except for when played on Extreme difficulty), essentially allowing the story to be replayed.

The "Final Horizon" update adds "Another Story", which adds Tails, Knuckles, and Amy as playable characters, each with their own skill sets. It also includes a new "true" final boss, a revamped version of the End, allowing Super Sonic to access cyber energy powers, such as Perfect Parry, but save slots from "Another Story" are separate from save slots from the main game. Completing this mode unlocks a "true ending" that expands upon the existing story.

== Plot ==
Doctor Eggman travels to the abandoned Starfall Islands archipelago to steal technological secrets created by the Ancients, ancestors of the Chao. When he uploads his artificial intelligence unit, Sage, into a portal, several robotic defense units are summoned. Detecting a threat signature, Sage ceases hijacking the portal and initiates a protection protocol, drawing the Chaos Emeralds to the islands and dragging Eggman into an artificial dimension called Cyber Space.

Sonic, Tails and Amy investigate the Chaos Emeralds' recent activity, but their plane is sucked into a wormhole to Cyber Space. Sonic escapes to the islands in the real world, where a disembodied voice tasks him with finding the emeralds and destroying the island's robotic Titans to remove the boundary between the real and digital worlds. Believing this will save his friends – including Knuckles, who was transported there while exploring the ruins above Angel Island (Note: As depicted in Sonic Frontiers Prologue: Divergence) – Sonic releases their digital forms from cages created by Sage, who works to free Eggman from Cyber Space; destroying the cages causes Sonic's body to become increasingly corrupted. Sage cautions Sonic to leave, influencing the islands' mechanical guardians and Titans to attack him, but grows to sympathize with him while observing his interactions with his friends. Meanwhile, she and Eggman form a mutual familial bond.

Through visions of the local Koco, Sonic and his friends learn the history of the Ancients, who are revealed to be an extraterrestrial race whose planet was destroyed by "The End", an all-powerful entity. The Ancients used the Chaos Emeralds to escape and were drawn to the Master Emerald on Earth, but the End followed and started to wipe out their new civilization. The Titans were built to seal the End within Cyber Space, with the Ancients' essences remaining within the Koco, which become inert once Sonic and his friends help them fulfill their final desires in life.

After destroying three of the Titans and disabling the towers that maintain the spatial boundary, Sonic succumbs to his corruption and is trapped between dimensions. Released along with his friends and Eggman, Sonic's guide reveals itself to be the End. After Sonic's friends purge the corruption from him by sacrificing their physical forms, Sage and Eggman help him collect the scattered Chaos Emeralds to fight the End, which attacks Earth using the last Titan, Supreme. When Sonic defeats Supreme, he and Sage use it to battle the End's true form, with Sage sacrificing herself to destroy the End. Sonic's friends are restored and leave the islands with him, now wishing to make a difference in their lives. Later, Eggman uses the island's technology to revive Sage. (Note: This is depicted in a post-credits scene that plays when the player has fully mapped each island in Easy or Normal Mode, or has battled the End in Hard or Extreme Mode.)

=== Another Story ===
"Another Story" is an alternate ending featured in the game's "Final Horizon" update where the events on Ouranos Island play out differently than the base game. Following his friends' sacrifice, Sonic accepts a proposal from Sage to restore them along with his cyber corruption, which he may convert into greater power to use against the End. Returning to their holographic forms, Sonic's friends retrieve the Chaos Emeralds while he undergoes trials overseen by the souls of the Titans' pilots and the Ancients' leader, Master King. After Sonic receives the Ancients' blessings and is cured of his corruption, Master King grants him temporary control over the cyber energy, which Sonic combines with his super form to destroy Supreme and the End. Afterwards, Sonic reunites with his newly freed friends, while Eggman and Sage happily return home as a family.

== Development ==
After completing Sonic Forces, we were brainstorming on what to do next. We realized there's little room for evolution with a traditional 3D Sonic game. We'd only be able to make something that fans have seen before. That's why, at the very start, we discussed as a team how to change this linear style of gameplay.

— Creative Officer Takashi Iizuka during an interview with IGN

=== Conception ===
Following the release of Sonic Forces (2017), Sonic Team began exploring approaches for its next Sonic the Hedgehog game. In addition to celebrating the series' upcoming 30th anniversary, the developers sought to define what a modern Sonic game should be and solidify the series' direction for the next decade. Iizuka felt the series needed to take an innovative direction that would lay the foundation for future games, similar to how Sonic the Hedgehog (1991) and Sonic Adventure (1998) set templates used by later games. Forces received criticism for its short length and level design, so its director, Morio Kishimoto, concluded that the team's method of designing levels originating from Sonic Unleashed (2008) would no longer satisfy fans. Sonic Team ultimately determined that the series' traditional linear design contained "little room for evolution" and felt it could not progress in this direction. In particular, Takashi Iizuka, the head of the development team and the producer of the Sonic series, felt 3D Sonic games were not giving players enough freedom and constrained them to linear paths. He stated that the goal with Frontiers was to "evolve the linear, stage-clearing 3D action [...] into a new action-packed adventure game where players have the freedom to explore the environment around them".

The idea to make an open-world Sonic game came from Kishimoto, who enjoyed watching the evolution of the platform genre's world map concept since it was popularized by Super Mario Bros. 3 in 1988. Some Sonic games, such as Sonic Adventure, featured world maps, but Kishimoto felt his idea evolved the concept by combining it with the gameplay. He thought it would allow for more freedom and diverse gameplay.

Kishimoto returned to direct Frontiers, while Sonic Unleashed (2008), Generations (2011) and Forces art director Sachiko Kawamura produced it. Frontiers' development lasted five years, longer than previous Sonic games' development cycles. Iizuka attributed the length partly to Frontiers not building on previous Sonic gameplay. Determining the game's direction required trial-and-error, and development restarted from scratch at one point. Sonic Team began holding external playtesting during Frontiers' development. The COVID-19 pandemic began during production, requiring Sonic Team to shift to remote work for the first time in its history. Iizuka noted that this made it difficult for developers to "get a sense of the big picture", but the benefit of digital communication "accelerated" other aspects of development.

=== Design ===
The designers focused on transitioning Sonic's speed and abilities to an open-world design while remaining true to previous games, and opted for a mysterious tone to reflect Sonic exploring an unfamiliar landscape. Iizuka felt Sonic's essence as a 3D action game separated Frontiers from adventure and role-playing games such as the Legend of Zelda series. Kishimoto prefers to describe Frontiers as "open zone" to "open world" as it refers specifically to a freely explorable field in a Sonic game, as to a broader term that can apply to any type of game. In designing Frontiers, Sonic Team drew upon their experiences developing the hub worlds of Sonic Adventure and repeatedly tested how fast Sonic could race through the open world to determine how large it needed to be. Iizuka said the largest challenge was ensuring that fast-paced exploration would be fun. Sonic Team chose not to raise the difficulty level as the game progresses since the open world would provide plenty of content.

Sonic Team decided to prioritize combat to a greater extent, but despite the shift to open-world design, Sonic Team determined that Frontiers did not feel like a Sonic game without platforming elements. This presented the challenge of balancing platforming with exploration; Sonic Team's solution was to have the world open up as a reward for completing challenges. The developers wanted to ensure that players could choose between combat and platforming and would not be forced to fight enemies, so they included various methods to collect items outside platforming and combat, such as puzzles. The 2020 Sonic the Hedgehog feature film influenced the development; Kishimoto requested that Sonic Team incorporate Easter eggs referencing it and based the combat on the film's depiction of Sonic. The games' Cyber Space environments were modeled after levels from older Sonic games in both appearance and design. When designing these levels, Kishimoto wanted Sonic to "once again... stand amongst the other 'stage-clear' action games" (Note: The term "stage-clear" refers to action games in which the main goal is to progress through and clear individual levels or stages.) that he enjoyed, like the Sega Genesis-era Sonic games and the Super Mario, Donkey Kong and Kirby series.

=== Writing ===
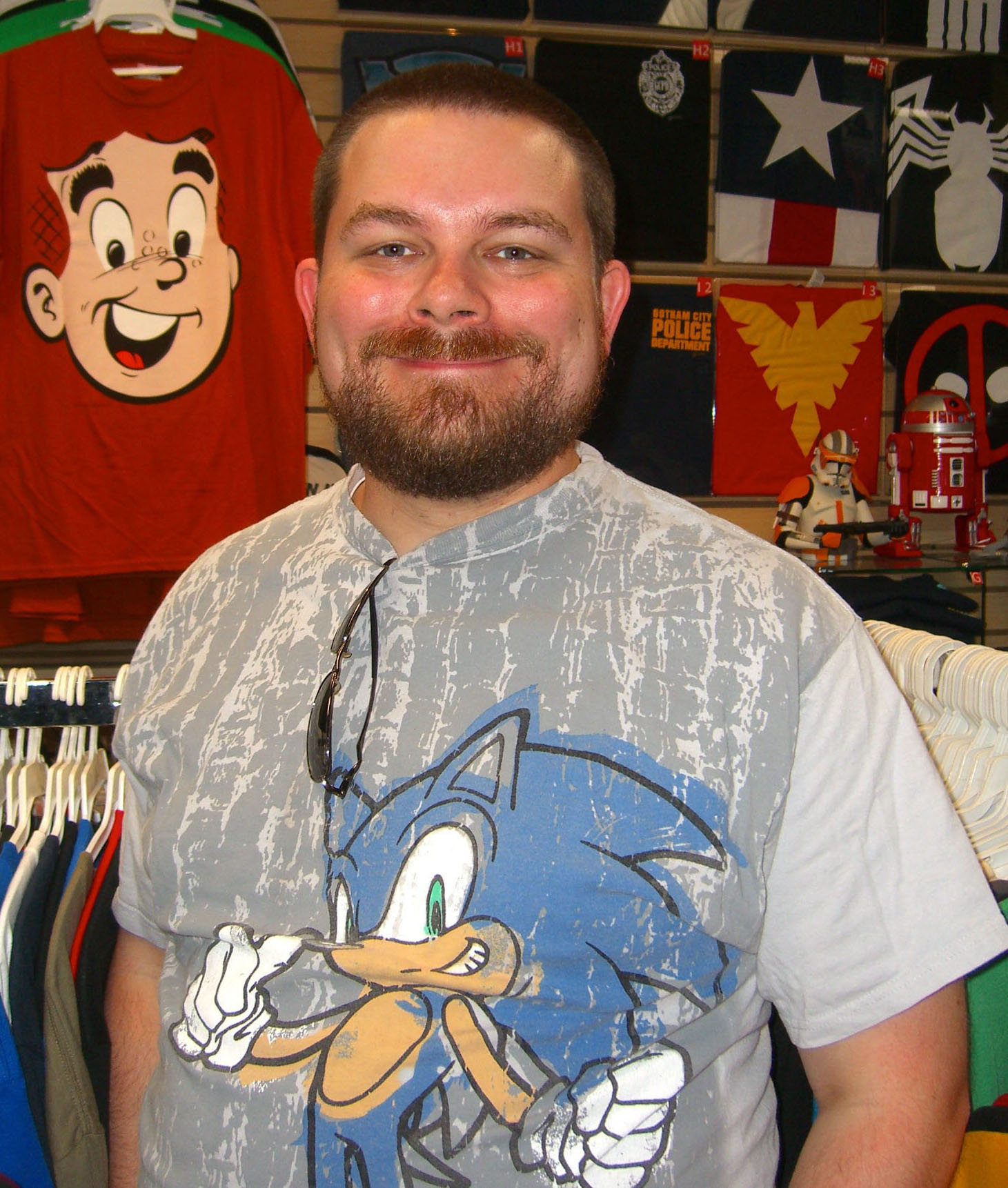
Ian Flynn, who had worked on several Sonic The Hedgehog comic books, was brought on to write Frontiers story.

Ian Flynn, who wrote Sonic the Hedgehog comics published by Archie Comics and IDW Publishing and episodes of the Sonic Boom TV series, wrote the script. Iizuka asked Flynn to write Frontiers after reading his work on the IDW comics. He felt Flynn understood the Sonic cast and would bring "a great improvement to the characters' emotions and dialogue". Iizuka noted that the story differs from previous Sonic games in that it is less humorous and does not make the player's goal obvious, instead challenging them to figure out how to solve problems themselves.

Whereas Flynn had pitched his previous Sonic stories himself, Sega dictated Frontiers's premise and which characters Flynn was allowed to use. Flynn considered it "a dream come true" to write a major Sonic game, and he was able to present ideas for using more characters to Sonic Team. Kishimoto said this created a "cooperative back and forth". Given the nonlinear approach, Flynn found pacing the story was "the biggest question" and "had to be massaged and revised as the game's structure took shape". Kishimoto did the Japanese localization using Flynn's script as a base, making changes to suit the Japanese market.

=== Music ===
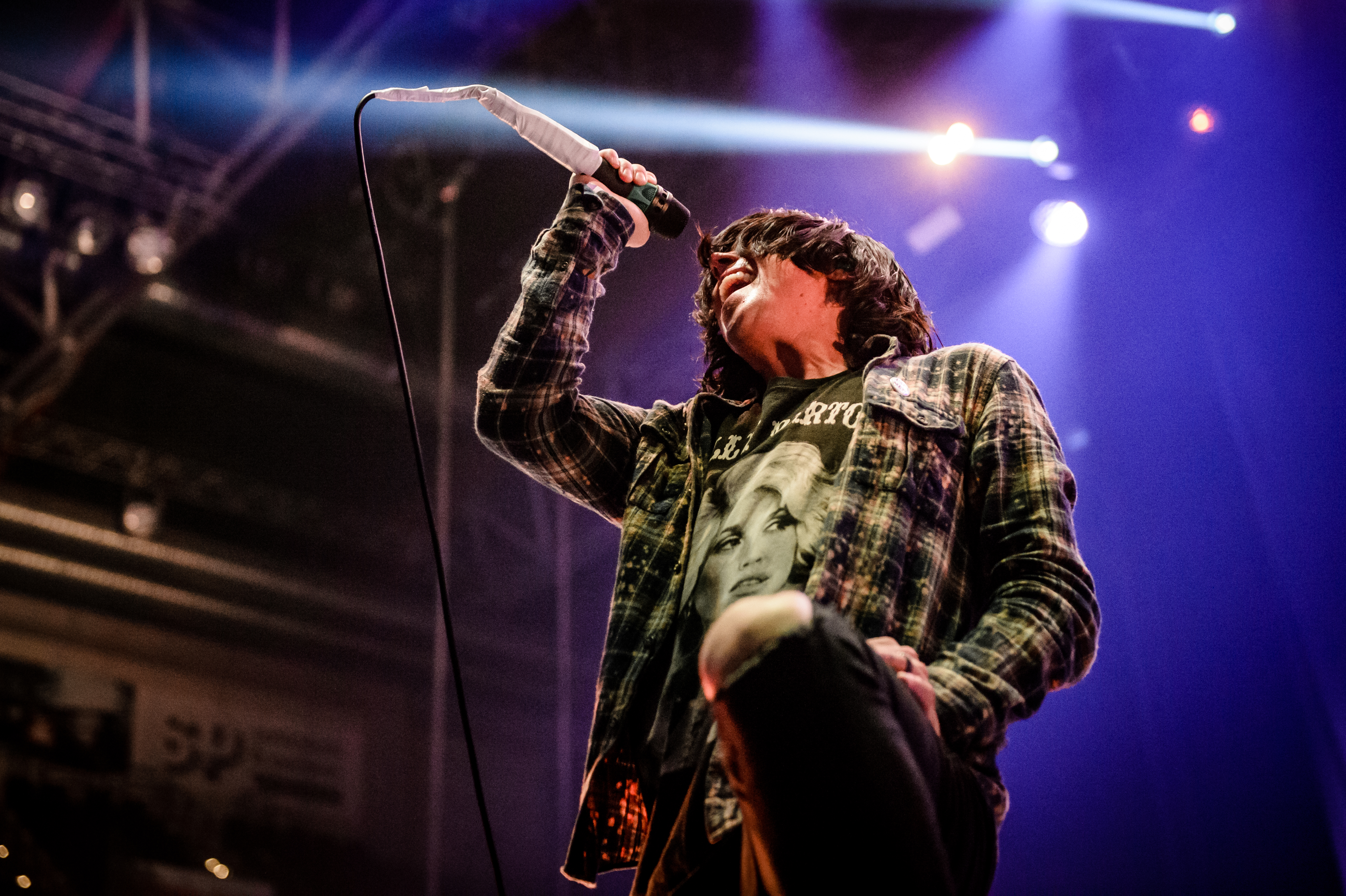
Sleeping with Sirens vocalist Kellin Quinn features in four songs on the soundtrack.

Tomoya Ohtani was the lead composer and sound director for Frontiers. In accordance with the tone, the Frontiers soundtrack is less upbeat and is "focused more on helping to create a mysterious feeling surrounding the islands". Ohtani composed the main theme, "I'm Here", with vocals and lyrics by Merry Kirk-Holmes of To Octavia. The song plays during the battle against Supreme, with the vocal track playing in its second phase. Sleeping with Sirens vocalist Kellin Quinn appears on the prior Titan battle themes: "Undefeatable" (Giganto), "Break Through It All" (Wyvern), "Find Your Flame" (Knight), with vocalist and producer Tyler Smyth of DangerKids featured on the third track. "Another Story" exclusively includes both an orchestral version of "I'm Here" and a heavier remix called "I'm Here – Revisited", with re-recorded vocals by Quinn, both of which play in the revamped The End battle. Japanese rock band One Ok Rock wrote and performed a censored version of one of the four ending themes, "Vandalize", which also appears on their tenth studio album Luxury Disease, albeit being the uncensored version. The other three ending themes are "Dear Father", "One Way Dream" and "I'm with you – Vocal ver.", performed by Quinn Barnitt, Nathan Sharp and Gaby Borro respectively, the latter of which also only appears in "Another Story". Additional music for the game was written by Kenichi Tokoi, Takahito Eguchi, Rintaro Soma, Kenji Mizuno, Kanon Oguni, and Hiroshi Kawaguchi, with additional vocals from Japanese singer YURI and Japanese-American singer Seann Bowe. The soundtrack album, Stillness & Motion, was released on December 7, 2022. It features 150 tracks spanning 6 hours and 37 minutes, making it the longest in the series. The soundtrack album debuted in the top 10 for the US Spotify chart a week after it was released.

An additional soundtrack album titled Paths Revisited, consisting of 46 tracks, was released on October 2, 2023 digitally, four days after the release of the game's third major update. A physical version released on November 15, 2023.

== Marketing and release ==
Sega originally planned to release Sonic Frontiers in 2021 to coincide with the franchise's 30th anniversary but delayed it by a year for quality control. Frontiers was released on November 8, 2022, for the Nintendo Switch, PlayStation 4, PlayStation 5, Windows, Xbox One and Xbox Series X/S.

Announcement video from The Game Awards 2021

Sega unveiled a teaser trailer, featuring Sonic running through a forest, at the end of a 30th-anniversary livestream on May 27, 2021. The title was not announced, but the trailer metadata and a Sega press release included the title Sonic Rangers. Iizuka later said that he felt the game was teased prematurely, but believed it necessary given that it was the series's 30th anniversary and that Sonic Team had not announced a game since Forces. Sega trademarked the name Sonic Frontiers in November 2021 and announced it the following month at the Game Awards 2021 in December.

Sega collaborated with video game news website IGN to promote Frontiers throughout June 2022. A trailer featured during the opening night of Gamescom on August 23, 2022. In Japan, the game offered cosmetic DLC in collaboration with VTuber Inugami Korone, available by pre-ordering the game. Additional information serving as a prelude to Frontiers was sold as pre-release promotional material, titled Sonic Frontiers Prologue. These included an eight-page comic, Sonic Frontiers Prologue: Convergence, released in October 2022, and an accompanying animated short, Sonic Frontiers Prologue: Divergence, released on November 1. The comic was drawn by Evan Stanley, an artist and writer on IDW's Sonic comic series, while animation was directed by Tyson Hesse; both were written by Flynn. (Note: Attributed to multiple sources:)

Sonic Frontiers sold in physical and digital versions, offering in-game items as pre-order bonuses, as well as a Digital Deluxe edition, which includes additional items, cosmetics for Sonic's gloves and shoes, a digital artbook and a mini digital soundtrack covering Kronos Island. Signing up for the official newsletter before January 31, 2023, gave players a free DLC code to unlock Sonic's Soap shoes from Sonic Adventure 2 (2001). Frontiers received a free DLC pack on November 14, 2022, that included additional cosmetics inspired by Capcom's Monster Hunter series as well as a cooking minigame. A holiday themed Santa Suit costume was released as free DLC on December 22. Several free content updates were announced shortly before The Game Awards 2022. The first, titled "Sights, Sounds, and Speed", included a Battle Rush mode where Sonic fights an island's enemies back to back, a Cyber Space Challenge mode where Sonic completes an island's Cyber Space levels back to back, a photo mode, and a jukebox that plays various music from Sonic's history obtained through "Sound Memories". The second update, "Sonic's Birthday Bash", includes several quality of life updates and birthday cosmetic items, as well as New Koco used to increase the boost gauge, New Game +, Action Chain Challenges, and the return of the Spin Dash. The third and final major update for the game, "The Final Horizon", released September 28, 2023, includes Tails, Knuckles and Amy as additional playable characters, and an overhaul of the game's climax and new challenges.

Some retailers sold copies of Sonic Frontiers before the street date, and the Nintendo Switch version was uploaded online. The composer, Tomoya Ohtani, said he was saddened by the leaks and urged players to not spoil the game.

=== Definitive Edition ===
Sonic Frontiers: Definitive Edition was released on June 23, 2026, coinciding with the franchise's 35th anniversary. In their time previewing the game, Digital Foundry found the graphical improvements going from the Switch to Switch 2 versions to be "substantial".

== Reception ==
=== Pre-release ===
Nintendo Life characterized early Frontiers gameplay footage as divisive. Kotaku felt the game looked fine but derivative and bland, lacking the series' unique identity, and Polygon and Nintendo Life found the open world desolate. Some fans demanded the game be delayed, and the hashtag #DelaySonicFrontiers briefly trended on Twitter. Iizuka said that Sonic Team expected early reactions to be polarized, as he felt the early footage would not give fans a good idea of what to expect.

=== Post-release ===
Reception

Aggregate score
| Aggregator | Score |
|---|---|
| Metacritic | 69/100 (NS); 75/100 (PC); 75/100 (PS4); 70/100 (PS5); 61/100 (XSXS) |

Review scores
| Publication | Score |
|---|---|
| Destructoid | 7/10 |
| Digital Trends | 1/5 |
| Game Informer | 7.8/10 |
| GameSpot | 7/10 |
| IGN | 7/10 |
| Nintendo Life | 4/10 |
| Push Square | 8/10 |
| Shacknews | 9/10 |
| VentureBeat | 4/5 |
| Video Games Chronicle | 4/5 |

According to the review aggregate website Metacritic, the PlayStation 4 version and Windows version of Sonic Frontiers received "generally favorable reviews", while other console versions received "mixed or average reviews".

Video Games Chronicle felt that the controls had been tightened up, but still occasionally had issues. Destructoid praised the amount of control the player has over Sonic, allowing them to go anywhere they can see. Game Informer wrote that Sonic controls "remarkably well" in the open environment. Nintendo Life found the controls "hit-and-miss", and Push Square remarked that the game occasionally took control away from the player.

The combat received mixed reviews. Digital Trends and Game Informer described the combat as enjoyable, with Game Informer describing it as "comprehensive". However, Digital Trends criticized its presentation in major boss fights. GameSpot felt the combat was simplistic while providing a diverse range of enemy variety. IGN criticized the combat in Frontiers for being repetitive and unengaging, explaining that the battles against faceless robotic enemies detracted from the fast-paced platforming gameplay.

Video Games Chronicles praised the game as the most "visually and aurally impressive" Sonic game to date, and Shacknews described the visuals of Frontiers as "stunning". IGN and VentureBeat pointed out issues with technical limitations causing large objects to pop into view, disrupting immersion and diminishing the overall polish of the game.

The soundtrack received positive responses. Push Square stated that Frontiers may have "the best soundtrack in the series", praising its lo-fi and rock themes. Writing for Game Informer, Brian Shea praised the music and felt that it contributed to some memorable moments in the game. GameSpot described the music as calming and solemn, comparing it to Breath of the Wild. Shacknews described the soundtrack as "phenomenal", with the boss battle music being a standout.

Sonic Frontiers was well received by Sonic fans. The Washington Post wrote that many enjoyed its controls, emphasis on freedom, story, references to prior Sonic games, and soundtrack. In its first weeks of release, Frontiers amassed over 9,000 reviews on Steam, 95% of which were positive. It also set the record for the largest number of concurrent players for a Sonic game on Steam, surpassing the record held by Sonic Mania.

=== Sales ===
The Nintendo Switch version of Sonic Frontiers was the fourth best-selling retail game during its first week of release in Japan, with 26,067 physical copies being sold. The PlayStation 5 version was the seventh best-selling retail game in the country throughout the same week, selling 11,111 physical copies. The PlayStation 4 version sold 9,098 physical copies and was the eighth best-selling retail game of the week in Japan, totaling 46,276 copies and outselling God of War Ragnarök. In the United States, Sonic Frontiers was the fourth best-selling game of November overall, and the 16th best-selling game of the year. On December 12, 2022, Sega announced that Frontiers had sold over 2.5 million copies worldwide, and would later announce that worldwide sales had surpassed 3.2 million copies in March 2023, 3.5 million by May 2023 and 4.5 million by 2025. In August 2026, it was reported that the game had sold 5 million copies.

=== Accolades ===
Sonic Frontiers was nominated in the Players' Voice category at The Game Awards 2022, but lost to Genshin Impact. At the 2023 Japan Game Awards, it was one of eleven titles to receive an "Award for Excellence".

=== Legacy ===
A location from the game, Chaos Island, features as a playable area in Shadow Generations. Sage, a character introduced in Frontiers, is a playable racer, as well as Kronos Island and Cyber Space as tracks, in Sonic Racing: CrossWorlds.
