= Erin Swenson =

American Presbyterian minister (born 1947)

Erin Katrina Swenson (born 1947) is an American minister of the Presbyterian Church (USA). She is recognized as an early openly transgender Christian cleric and was the first mainline Protestant to be so when the Presbytery of Greater Atlanta voted in favor of sustaining her ordination as minister in 1996 after two decades of service.

After transitioning, Swenson sought affirmation for her therapy ministry and name change from the church. Despite controversy, the Presbytery of Greater Atlanta upheld her ordination as a minister on October 22, 1996, with a vote of 186 to 161, despite conservative opposition. She founded the Southern Association for Gender Education (SAGE) and co-moderated More Light Presbyterians, an LGBT advocacy group within Presbyterian Church. In 2005, she received the Lazarus Award for empowering LGBT individuals.

As of 2020, Swenson is retired from ministry and hosts the podcast "So Much More than Gender".

== Early life and education ==
Swenson was born in Buffalo, New York, in 1947. In 1957, her family relocated to Atlanta, Georgia where she attended Sandy Springs High School. Aged 11, Swenson had dreams in which she would transition from male to female, and began cross-dressing in her own room. However, she did not feel she could be open about her gender identity within her socially conservative and sexually repressed household.

Swenson enrolled at the Georgia Institute of Technology in 1965. In 1967, she met Sigrid Lyons; the two married shortly thereafter. In 1970, the couple had their first child. Soon after, Swenson pursued her studies at the Columbia Theological Seminary and became a supervisor of seminarians at Emory University's Candler School of Theology in 1973. Swenson completed her theological education with honors in 1973, whereupon she became an ordained minister. After completing an internship, she served her ministry as the Minister of Education at the First Presbyterian Church of Dalton in Georgia. In 1976, their second child was born prematurely and required special care and multiple operations due to having cerebral palsy. It was at this time that Swenson began having suicidal thoughts.

The family later returned to Atlanta, where Swenson pursued a graduate degree in Pastoral Counseling while working as a Clinical Chaplain at the Georgia Retardation Center. Swenson says the marriage was difficult as the two were unable to be fully open with one another, with Swenson secretly wearing her wife's clothes. In 1995, the couple divorced after 27 years of marriage.

== Career ==
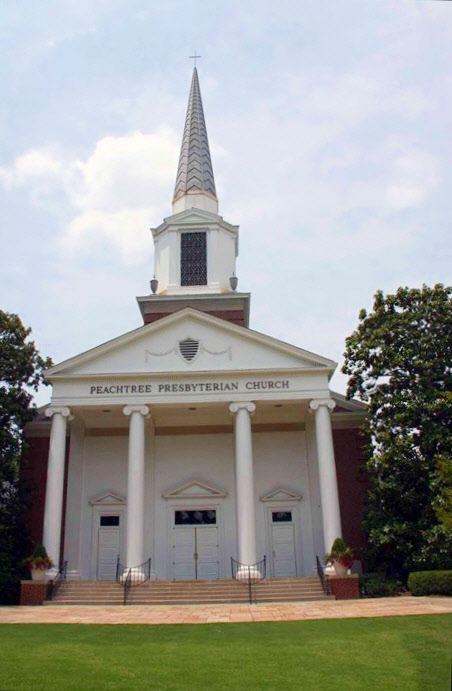
Front entrance to the Peachtree Presbyterian Church as of 2014

In 1981, Swenson joined the staff of the Atlanta Psychiatric Clinic and the Center for Personal Growth as a pastoral clinical psychotherapist following the completion of her Master of Theology in Pastoral Counseling at Columbia Theological Seminary. In 1984, she assumed the role of Director of the Center for Pastoral Care, a collaborative effort between Peachtree Presbyterian Church and the Episcopal Cathedral of Saint Philip in Atlanta. That year, she began a private marriage counseling service.

Swenson co-founded the Brookwood Center for Psychotherapy in 1987 with Karen Faulk. In 1989, she received a Ph.D. in Psychological Services from Columbia Pacific University. In recognition of her efforts in advancing professional licensing legislation in Georgia, Swenson received the Distinguished Service to the State award from the Georgia Association for Marriage and Family Therapy in 1995, the year she left the center and underwent gender transition. This was the first known time a mainline Protestant minister underwent gender transition while still in ordained office. Swenson's family had initially been reluctant to accept her gender transition. However, she explained that she had gender identity disorder (gender dysphoria) and told herself about her prior suicidal ideation, saying that she may kill herself if she was forced to live as a man. After a period of 18 months, Swenson's family came to accept her gender identity. Her father helped pay the $14,000 ($28,890 in 2024) needed for gender-affirming surgery.

After transitioning, Swenson spoke about how she felt more authentically herself, saying of her past self: "He seems like somebody who doesn't come around anymore." Initially, Swenson did not seek to remain a pastor, but wanted to have her ministry as a therapist affirmed by the church and for her name to be officially changed on church registers. This request caused division, with ministers and lay representatives sending the issue to the Committee on Ministry for approval. After deliberation within the committee, the Presbytery of Greater Atlanta voted 186 to 161 in favor of sustaining her ordination as minister on October 22, 1996, in spite of opposition from conservative members such as pastor Don Wade of the Rehobeth Presbyterian Church, who said he disagreed with "solv[ing] a psychological and emotional problem in this manner", saying that he believed transgender people could be healed through the power of prayer.

Swenson was a tennis player, and played against in the women's leagues for her local team in Chamblee, Georgia. This was opposed by a team from Loganville, who argued that Swenson was ineligible for the women's leagues as she was assigned male at birth. In 1996, the Atlanta Lawn Tennis Association (ALTA) voted to allow Swenson to play tennis for the women's leagues, saying that since Swenson had undergone gender transition and surgery and was recognized as a woman by the State of Georgia, she was eligible to play in the women's leagues.

She was the founder of the Southern Association for Gender Education (SAGE) and the co-moderator of More Light Presbyterians, an LGBT advocacy group within the Presbyterian Church (USA). In 2005, she was awarded the Lazarus Award, given by the Presbytery of the Pacific and the Synod of Southern California and Hawaii in recognition of individuals and groups that empower LGBT people.

== Retirement from the ministry ==
As of 2020, Swenson is retired from the ministry, and hosts a podcast, So Much More than Gender. As of March 2022, Swenson was still a licensed marriage and family therapist, with a focus on transgender issues.
