= Curdin Orlik =

Swiss wrestler (born 1993)

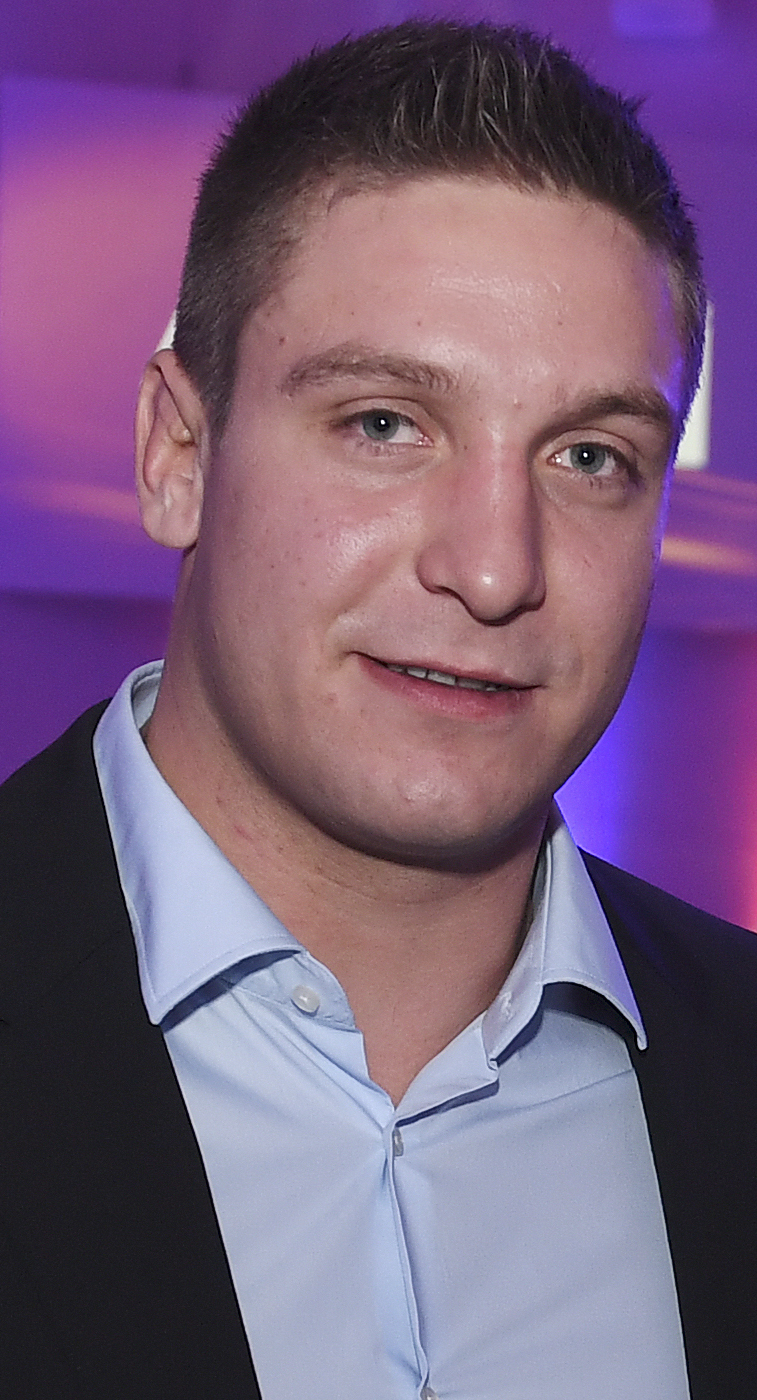

Curdin Orlik (born 5 February 1993) is a Swiss professional wrestler who competes in Schwingen (a type of folk wrestling native to Switzerland), and an agronomist. Orlik came out as gay in March 2020, making him the first athlete in the sport of Schwingen to come out as gay, and also the first openly gay male active in Swiss professional sports.

== Early life and career ==
Orlik was raised in Landquart, Grisons. He is the brother of wrestler Armon Orlik.

Orlik competes in Schwingen, a form of folk wrestling that is native to Switzerland.

Orlin was named "Schwinger of the Week" by the Swiss magazine Schlussgang in May 2019. So far in his wrestling career he has been awarded thirty-five wreaths and has won five festivals. In 2019 he ranked twenty-fourth in the Eidgenössischer Schwingerverband.

He also works as an agronomist.

== Personal life ==
Orlik was previously married to a woman, with whom he has a son. They later separated. He is the first athlete in the sport of Schwingen to come out as gay and also the first openly gay male active in Swiss professional sports, after having come out in March 2020.
