= Jim Foster (activist) =

American LGBT rights and Democratic activist

- Born: James M. Foster; November 19, 1934
- Died: October 31, 1990 (aged 55); San Francisco, California
- Cause of death: AIDS-related illness
- Known for: Early LGBT rights activist

James M. Foster (November 19, 1934 – October 31, 1990) was an American LGBT rights and Democratic activist. Foster became active in the early gay rights movement when he moved to San Francisco following his undesirable discharge from the United States Army in 1959 for being homosexual. Foster co-founded the Society for Individual Rights (SIR), an early homophile organization, in 1964. Dianne Feinstein credited SIR and the gay vote with generating her margin of victory in her election to the San Francisco Board of Supervisors in 1969.

In 1971, Foster, along with Del Martin and Phyllis Lyon, transformed the SIR Political Action Committee into the Alice B. Toklas Memorial Democratic Club. The Toklas club was the first gay Democratic club in country. Also in 1971, Foster was instrumental in convincing Richard Hongisto to run for sheriff and in delivering gay votes to his winning campaign. It became a truism of San Francisco politics that, as long-time activist José Sarria had put it, "nobody ran for anything in San Francisco without knocking on the door of the gay community."

In 1972, after the Toklas club delivered one-third of the signatures needed to secure George McGovern the first position on the California Democratic primary ballot, Foster was added to the list of speakers at the 1972 Democratic National Convention. Originally, Foster had been given a prime time speaking slot, but George McGovern's campaign manager, future U.S. Senator and presidential candidate Gary Hart, changed it to a 3:00 a.m. speaking slot. The campaign had decided they needed to tone down their radical image. He and fellow delegate Madeline Davis were the first openly LGBT people ever to address a national party convention. He called upon the Democratic Party to add a gay rights plank to the party platform, saying:

We do not come to you begging your understanding or pleading your tolerance. We come to you affirming our pride in our lifestyle, affirming the validity of our right to seek and to maintain meaningful emotional relationships and affirming our right to participate in the life of this country on an equal basis with every citizen.

Foster and other gay rights activists got a minority report to the floor, but the plank was defeated.

Foster was approached by fledgling gay politician Harvey Milk in 1973. Milk sought Foster's endorsement for his first campaign for Supervisor. Foster, who through the Toklas club had staked out a position that it was best for the gay community to work with liberal establishment politicians than try to elect gay candidates, refused to support Milk's campaign. This led to an enmity between the men which lasted until Milk's assassination in 1978. It has been suggested that this enmity, which extended to the Toklas club and the Milk-founded San Francisco Gay Democratic Club, may have hampered the LGBT community's early efforts to address the spread of HIV in San Francisco.

In 1980, Foster served as the coordinator for northern California for Ted Kennedy's presidential campaign. When Kennedy's campaign was struggling financially, Foster kept his local campaign office open using his own funds. Kennedy credited Foster for delivering his victory in the 1980 California primary.

Foster was a founding member of the San Francisco Health Commission in 1985. In 1989 he was hired by pharmaceutical company Lymphomed as a consultant.

Foster died of an AIDS-related illness at his San Francisco home on October 31, 1990. His ashes were entombed in Grace Cathedral Columbarium at San Francisco.

== See also ==
- Sexual orientation and the United States military
