= Peachtree Presbyterian Church =

Coordinates: 33°50.846′N 84°22.953′W

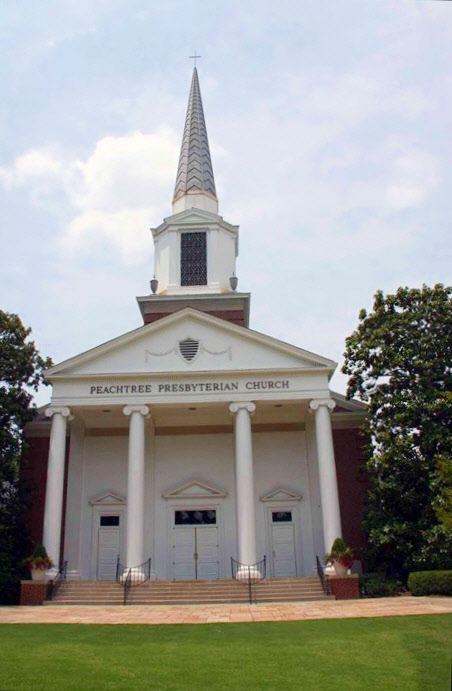
- The front of Peachtree Presbyterian Church from Roswell Rd
- Peachtree Presbyterian Church
- Country: United States
- Denomination: Presbyterian Church (USA)
- Website: https://peachtreechurch.com/

Peachtree Presbyterian Church is a 7,500-member church located in the Buckhead district of Atlanta, Georgia. It averages about 1,700 adults and 500 children and students (2025) in weekly worship, and is one of the largest Presbyterian congregations in the United States of America.

== History ==
Peachtree began as a Sunday school for children in Atlanta founded in 1910 by Charles and Ida Honour. The church itself was chartered on November 3, 1919. The original church was a gray granite building built in 1926 at the corner of Peachtree Road and Mathieson Drive.

The congregation grew steadily, and moved to its present location at 3434 Roswell Road in the Buckhead area of Atlanta in May 1960, where the church campus now covers 26 acres (110,000 m^{2}). In September 1999 the church opened a large, modern recreation center which includes two basketball courts. The Gym at Peachtree offers a range of fitness and recreational programs, which the church sees as an integral part of the ministry.

By 1992 the church had the largest Presbyterian congregation in the US. The senior pastor at the time, Rev. W. Frank Harrington, grew the church from fewer than 3,000 members in 1971 to more than 11,000 at the time of his death in 1999. In 1992, Rev. Harrington was runner-up in the election for moderator of the then-2.9-million-member denomination. In 2000 Dr. Victor D. Pentz became Senior Pastor. Pentz, from Southern California, had varied experience before joining Peachtree, including a chaplaincy to the crew of three Space Shuttle launches at Cape Canaveral, running an evangelistic beach ministry to Southern California surfers and speaking at conferences around the world. Dr. Pentz retired in May 2016.

In January 2017, Dr. Richard Kannwischer became the eighth Senior Pastor of Peachtree Presbyterian Church. He has been a pastor for over twenty-five years and has served congregations in Texas, California, and the NYC metropolitan area. Dr. Kannwischer studied business at Trinity University in San Antonio before completing his master's from Princeton Seminary and his Doctorate from Fuller Theological Seminary. He has been honored to serve as a member of the board of trustees for all three of his higher educational institutions. He is currently a Board of Director at the historic Fox Theatre in Atlanta.

== See also ==
- List of the largest churches in the US
