= Monica Romano =

Italian activist, writer and politician

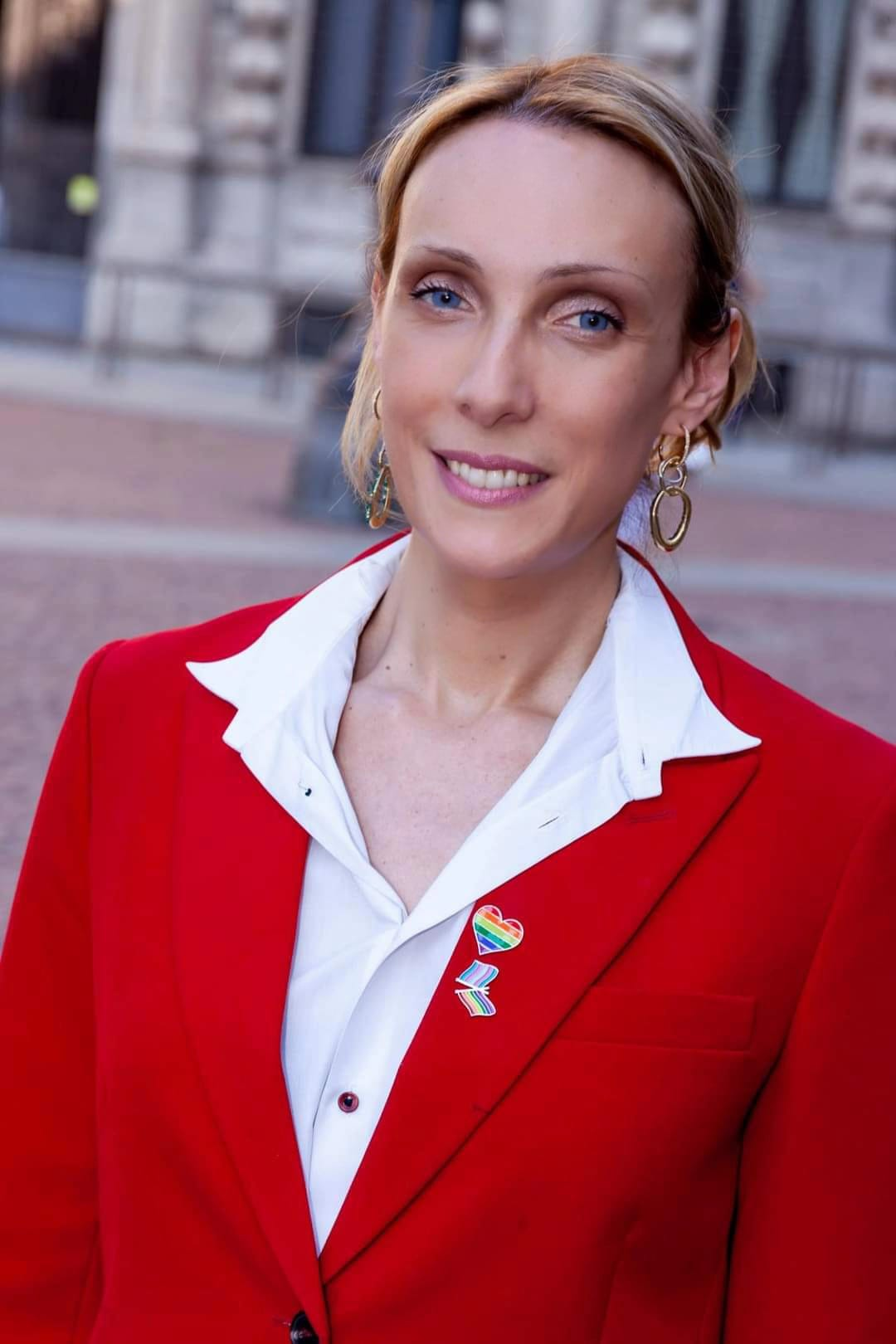
Image of Monica Romano

Monica J. Romano is an Italian activist, writer and politician. She was the first transgender municipal councilor in Milan.

== Biography ==
Romano was born in 1979 in Milan, Italy. She came from a working-class family. Her mother is from La Spezia and her father is from Sicily. In 1997, she graduated from high school (classical lyceum). In 1998, she came out as a trans woman, choosing the name Monica.

In the same year she began her activism in associations and Italian LGBT movements, fascinated by her mentor Deborah Lambillotte. Her best-known activism is for transgender people's right to work.

Her activism has been going on for more than twenty years.

In 2006 the Italian State, by judgment of the court, recognised the name Monica as her legal name. The "J" in her middle name is the first letter of her birth name. She has kept this "to highlight a political positioning of rejection of binary logic, passing logic and normalizazion that have always oppressed transgender, non-binary and gender non-conforming people and communities".

In 2007, she graduated in Political Science.

In 2008, she wrote her first book "Transsexuality as Object of Discrimination", essay about discrimination of transgender people in contemporary society.

In 2015 she wrote "Stories of XY girls", a bildungsroman based on the story of her life and in 2017 she wrote "Gender (R) Evolution", memoir about her activism. Both books were published by Ugo Mursia.

In 2021, she ran for municipal elections in Milan for the Democratic Party, taking 938 votes. She won the election and became the first transgender woman municipal councilor in the history of Milan.

In 2023 she published the book Indietro non si torna. Il lungo cammino dei diritti civili delle persone LGBT+ in Italia. Una storia personale, una battaglia politica (Note: "No going back. The long journey of civil rights for LGBT+ people in Italy. A personal story, a political battle") with a preface by Alessandro Zan, published by TEA.
