= Founder =

Founder or Founders may refer to:

== Places ==
- Founders Park, a stadium in South Carolina, formerly known as Carolina Stadium
- Founders Park, a waterside park in Islamorada, Florida

== Arts, entertainment, and media ==
- Founders (Star Trek), the alien leaders of the fictional state and military superpower the Dominion, in Star Trek
- The Founder (newspaper), the student newspaper at Royal Holloway, University of London
- The Founder, a 2016 biographical feature film about McDonald's pioneer Ray Kroc
- The Founders, a 2016 documentary about the founders of the LPGA directed by Charlene Fisk and Carrie Schrader'
- The Founder, a character from the 2025 video game Shuten Order

== Companies and organizations ==
- Founder Group, a Chinese information technology and pharmaceutical conglomerate
  - Founder Technology, a Shanghai subsidiary
- Founders Brewing Company, a craft brewery located in Grand Rapids, Michigan, United States
- Founders Ministries, Christian group in the United States
- Worshipful Company of Founders, a livery company based in London, England, United Kingdom

== Roles ==
- Organizational founder, the person or group of persons responsible for creating an entity
  - Founder, in entrepreneurship, the starter of a private or public company
  - Philanthropist, the starter of a charity
  - Founder CEO
- Founder, a metallurgist who operates a foundry
- Founding Fathers - see list of national founders

== Science and healthcare ==
- Founder, a hoof ailment caused by laminitis
- Founder effect, genetic effect of expansion of isolated small populations

== Other uses ==
- Founder (IRC), management status for Internet Relay Chat
- To founder (or foundering), a nautical term for shipwrecking

== See also ==
- Foundered strata, rock beds which have collapsed due to removal of underlying beds
- List of founders of English schools and colleges
