= Alice B. Toklas LGBTQ Democratic Club =

San Francisco LGBTQ political club

The Alice B. Toklas LGBTQ Democratic Club (first known as The Alice B. Toklas Memorial Democratic Club and later the Alice B. Toklas LGBT Democratic Club) is a San Francisco-based association and political action committee for lesbian, gay, bisexual, and transgender and queer (LGBTQ) Democrats.

The political club is currently active in its endorsement of Democratic candidates in the San Francisco area.

== History ==
Founded in 1971 by activists Del Martin and Phyllis Lyon, Beth Elliott, and Jim Foster, it was the first organization for gay Democrats in the United States. It is named after lesbian writer and San Francisco native Alice B. Toklas. The club has been known for its more moderate approach but is now considered to have a big tent ideology and to the left of the national Democratic Party. In 1976, local LGBTQ activists broke off to form the more progressive Harvey Milk Lesbian, Gay, Bisexual, Transgender Democratic Club.

The club hosts an annual breakfast during Pride. In 2016, the event was attended by more than 800 people and was addressed by House Minority Leader Nancy Pelosi, several members of Congress, and several state and local elected leaders. In 2024, the breakfast's keynote was Second Gentleman Doug Emhoff.

== See also ==
- National Stonewall Democrats
