= Foundered strata =

Foundered strata is a term used by the British Geological Survey in its maps and geological memoirs, and by other authors, to describe rock strata which have collapsed due, for example, to the dissolution of underlying strata. Foundered strata may retain original bedding more or less intact or they may assume a chaotic structure in the process of collapse or some intermediate state of disruption.

Examples of foundered strata are found along the northern margin of the outcrop of the Twrch Sandstone (the former Basal Grit of the Millstone Grit) in the Brecon Beacons National Park of South Wales. The immediately underlying Carboniferous Limestone has dissolved away in numerous locations such as at Pwll Byfre and resulted in the wholesale collapse of the sandstone beds above it. It is thought that the sandstone has been let down several hundred feet in places due to the removal by solution of limestone strata.

== See also ==
- Karst – Topography from dissolved soluble rocks
