= Quinnie =

American musician

Quinn Barnitt (born May 17, 2001), known professionally as quinnie (stylized in lower case), is an American indie rock musician from New Jersey.

== History ==
Barnitt began her career releasing demos and songs on Bandcamp in 2017. In 2019, she released her first EP titled gold star. Between 2021 and 2023 she released music as a duo with friend Jake Weinberg under the name "CRITTER". Weinberg has since worked as a producer for quinnie. In 2022, quinnie's song "touch tank" went viral on TikTok, giving her considerably more attention. Her debut album, flounder (2023), received positive reviews. She later released several bonus tracks for flounder and a deluxe edition on July 28, 2023. (Note: Barnitt, Quinn [@quinnie]; (July 22, 2023). "flounder deluxe is all out in the open on friday the 28th. 2 new songs. gold ring is one of them. presave in my bio. if u zoom in u can see 5 seals at the estuary. i love u" – via Instagram.)

Barnitt featured on a song in the Sonic Frontiers Original Soundtrack Stillness & Motion in 2022, titled "Dear Father".

In 2024, quinnie released a three-song EP titled you can hold the stars until they burn right through your hands. (Note: Barnitt, Quinn [@quinnie]; (July 8, 2024). "ok im gunna put out a little bit of new music. its a three song ep called "you can hold the stars until they burn right through your hands" that comes out on july 12th" – via Instagram.)

In 2025, she released the singles "baja bird," "paper doll," and "hate fuck" in advance of her second album paper doll. The album was released on July 24, 2025 and deals with themes of relationships, womanhood, and freedom.

== Reception ==
Heven Haile of Pitchfork praised the flounder album's vivid, childlike imagery and notes that the artists "tackles contemporary discourse without making it feel like you're scrolling through social media."

Critics praised the vocals and production on the album paper doll. Anna Zanes of Alternative Press noted the thematic progression from quinnie's debut album and wrote "while excavating the female experience and all of its incumbent heartbreak, no matter how heavy the subject matter, the music remains almost playful."
