= Quinnie Perez =

American politician

Quinnie Pérez

Member-Elect of the Orange County, Florida Soil and Water Conservation District Board

Personal details
- Born: November 23, 1993 (age 32) Ocala, Florida, U.S.
- Party: Democratic
- Occupation: farmworker

Quinnie Pérez (born November 23, 1993) is an American politician and medical cannabis farmworker. In November 2026, she was elected to Orange County, Florida's Soil and Water Conservation District Board, becoming the first openly transgender person in Florida to be elected to public office.

== Biography ==
Perez is the daughter of Mexican immigrants who were employed as farmworkers. She grew up near Ocala, Florida. Perez is a trans woman and began her gender transition around 2024.

Perez works as a cultivator and harvestor for Curaleaf, a medical cannabis company. Prior to running for public office, Perez worked on various political campaigns, including for Florida state senator Carlos Guillermo Smith, and for the LGBTQ advocacy group Equality Florida. On November 3, 2026, she was elected to the Soil and Water Conservation District Board for Orange County, Florida, becoming the first openly transgender person elected to public office in Florida. She received over 35,500 votes (43% of the vote) in a three-way race for Seat 1, defeating Doug Sahr and Vicente Rafael Pérez Carreño. Her campaign was endorsed by the LGBTQ+ Victory Fund.
