= Timeline of LGBTQ history, 21st century =

The following is a timeline of lesbian, gay, bisexual, transgender and queer (LGBTQ) history in the 21st century.

Worldwide laws regarding same-sex intercourse, unions and expression. Same-sex intercourse legal. Recognition of unions: Marriage / Extraterritorial marriage^{2}; Civil unions / Limited domestic; Limited foreign / Optional certification; Same-sex intercourse illegal. Penalties: Death / Prison; death not enforced; Death under militias / Prison, with arrests or detention; Prison, not enforced^{1}; Same-sex intercourse Restricted/Ambiguous. Depends are: No data / Restriction of expression, not enforced; Restriction of association with arrests or detention^{1}No imprisonment in the past three years or moratorium on law.^{2}Marriage not available locally. Some jurisdictions may perform other types of partnerships.

== 2000s ==
2001

- Same-sex marriages laws:
  - Came into effect: The Netherlands (with joint adoption)
- Civil Union/Registered Partnership laws:
  - Came into effect: Germany (without adoption until Oct 2004, then with step-adoption only)
  - Passed: Finland (without joint adoption until May 2009, then with step-adoption)
- Limited Partnership laws:
  - Passed and Came into effect: Portugal (without joint adoption) (replaced with marriage in 2010)
  - Came into effect: Swiss canton of Geneva (without joint adoption)
- Anti-discrimination legislation: US states of Rhode Island (private sector, gender identity) and Maryland (private sector, sexual orientation)
- Equalization of age of consent: Albania, Estonia, Liechtenstein and United Kingdom.
- Repeal of Sodomy laws: US state of Arizona
- Decriminalisation of homosexuality: the rest of the United Kingdom's territories
- Homosexuality no longer an illness: China
- Marches and Prides: Protesters disrupt the first Pride march in the Serbian capital city of Belgrade
- The first memorial in the United States honoring LGBT veterans was dedicated in Desert Memorial Park, Cathedral City, California.
- Helene Faasen and Anne-Marie Thus, from the Netherlands, became the first two women to legally marry.
- Pink Triangle Park was dedicated; it is the first permanent, free-standing memorial in America dedicated to the thousands of persecuted homosexuals in Nazi Germany during the Holocaust of World War II.

2002

- Civil Union/Registered Partnership laws:
  - Passed and Came into effect: Canadian province of Quebec (with joint adoption)
  - Came into effect: Finland (without joint adoption until May 2009, then with step-adoption)
  - Passed: Argentinian city of Buenos Aires (without joint adoption)
- Limited Partnerships laws:
  - Passed: Swiss canton of Zürich (without joint adoption)
- Same-sex couple adoption legalisation: South Africa (joint and step adoption) and Sweden (joint and step adoption)
- Anti-discrimination legislation: US states of Alaska (public sector, sexual orientation) and New York (private sector, sexual orientation)
  - Canada's Northwest Territories updates human rights legislation to formally include sexual orientation, and is the first jurisdiction in Canada to ban discrimination based on gender identity; they all would by 2017.
- Equalization of age of consent: Austria, Bulgaria, Cyprus, Hungary, Moldova, Romania and the Australian state of Western Australia
- Repeal of Sodomy laws: Romania, Costa Rica and the US States of Arkansas and Massachusetts
- Other: openly gay Dutch politician Pim Fortuyn is assassinated by Volkert van der Graaf
- Parents and Friends of Lesbians and Gays established its Transgender Network, also known as TNET, as its first official "Special Affiliate," recognized with the same privileges and responsibilities as its regular chapters.
- At the Reform seminary Hebrew Union College-Jewish Institute of Religion in New York, the Reform rabbi Margaret Wenig organized the first school-wide seminar at any rabbinical school which addressed the psychological, legal, and religious issues affecting people who are intersex or transsexual.

2003

- Same-sex marriage laws:
  - Passed and Came into effect: Belgium (without joint adoption until Apr 2006) and the Canadian provinces of Ontario and British Columbia
- Civil Union/Registered Partnership laws:
  - Came into effect: Argentinian city of Buenos Aires (without joint adoption)
  - Passed:: Australian state of Tasmania (step adoption only)
- Limited Partnerships laws:
  - Came into effect: Austria (without joint adoption)(replaced with registered partnerships 2010) and Croatia (without registration or adoption)
- Anti-discrimination legislation: Bulgaria (all sectors, sexual orientation), United Kingdom (excluding religious organisations, sexual orientation), US states of Arizona (public sector, sexual orientation), Kentucky (public sector, sexual orientation and gender identity), Michigan (executive branch of the state government, sexual orientation), New Mexico (private sector, sexual orientation and gender identity) and Pennsylvania (public sector, gender identity)
- End to ban on gay people in the military: Russia
- Equalization of age of consent: Australian state and territory (resp.) of New South Wales and Northern Territory
- Repeal of Sodomy laws: Armenia
- Repeal of the concept of Buggery in law: United Kingdom
- Decriminalisation of homosexuality: Iraq, Armenia and United States [nationwide]
- Recriminalisation of homosexuality: Belize
- Section 28 was repealed in England and Wales and Northern Ireland.
- Gene Robinson became the first openly gay Bishop in the Episcopal church in the USA.
- Reuben Zellman became the first openly transgender person accepted to the Hebrew Union College-Jewish Institute of Religion, where he was ordained in 2010.
- In 2003, the Committee on Jewish Law and Standards approved a rabbinic ruling that concluded that sex reassignment surgery (SRS) is permissible as a treatment of gender dysphoria, and that a transgender person's sex status under Jewish law is changed by SRS.
- Legal recognition of indeterminate gender: Alex MacFarlane became the first person reported to obtain a birth certificate and passport, in Australia, showing indeterminate gender.
- In 2003 the Reform rabbi Margaret Wenig organized the first school-wide seminar at the Reconstructionist Rabbinical College which addressed the psychological, legal, and religious issues affecting people who are intersex or transsexual.
- Jennifer Finney Boylan's autobiography, She's Not There: A Life in Two Genders, was the first book by an openly transgender American to become a bestseller.
- Buffy the Vampire Slayer showed girlfriends Willow Rosenberg and Tara Maclay in bed together, which though not a sex scene was considered the first scene of its kind for a broadcast network series.
- The first lesbian sex scene in broadcast TV history occurred, on Buffy the Vampire Slayer.
- Patrick Harvie became the first openly bisexual Member of the Scottish Parliament.

2004

- Same-sex marriage laws:
  - Passed and Came into effect: Canadian provinces of Manitoba (with adoption), Newfoundland and Labrador, Nova Scotia, Quebec (with adoption), and Saskatchewan, and the Canadian territory of Yukon, US State of Massachusetts
- Civil Union/Registered Partnership laws:
  - Passed and Came into effect: Brazilian State of Rio Grande do Sul, Luxembourg (without joint adoption) and US state of Maine
  - Came into effect: Australian state of Tasmania (step adoption only)
  - Passed: New Zealand (without joint adoption)
- Limited Partnership laws:
  - Passed and Came into effect: New Jersey
- Same-sex couple adoption legalisation: Germany (Step Adoption)
- Banning of Same-sex marriage: Australia, US states of Mississippi, Missouri, Montana, Oregon and Utah
- Banning of Same-sex marriage and civil unions: US states of Arkansas, Georgia, Kentucky, Louisiana, Michigan, North Dakota, Ohio, Oklahoma, Virginia and Wisconsin
- Anti-discrimination legislation: Portugal, US States of Indiana (public sector, gender identity), Louisiana (public sector, sexual orientation) and Maine
- Equalization of age of consent: Lithuania
- Decriminalisation of homosexuality: Cape Verde, Marshall Islands and San Marino
- The L Word featured television's first ensemble cast of lesbian characters.
- The first all-transgender performance of the Vagina Monologues was held. The monologues were read by eighteen notable transgender women, and a new monologue revolving around the experiences and struggles of transgender women was included.
- Del Martin and Phyllis Lyon became the first same-sex couple to be legally married in the United States, when San Francisco mayor Gavin Newsom allowed city hall to grant marriage licenses to same-sex couples. However, all same-sex marriages done in 2004 in California were annulled. After the California Supreme Court decision in 2008 that granted same-sex couples in California the right to marry, Del Martin and Phyllis Lyon remarried, and were again the first same-sex couple in the state to marry. Later in 2008 Prop 8 banned same-sex marriage in California, but the marriages that occurred between the California Supreme Court decision legalizing same-sex marriage and the approval of Prop 8 are still considered valid, including the marriage of Del Martin and Phyllis Lyon. However, Del Martin died in 2008.
- James McGreevey, then governor of New Jersey, came out as gay, thus becoming the first openly gay state governor in United States history. He resigned soon after.
- Bisi Alimi became the first Nigerian to declare his homosexuality on television.
- Luna, by Julie Anne Peters, was published, and was the first young-adult novel with a transgender character to be released by a mainstream publisher.
- The first Trans pride march was held in San Francisco in 2004.
- Karamo Brown started his career in television on the MTV reality series The Real World: Philadelphia in 2004, becoming the first out gay black man on reality TV.

2005

- Same-sex marriage laws:
  - Passed and Came into effect: Canada [nationwide], Spain (with joint adoption)
- Civil Union/Registered Partnership laws:
  - Passes and Came into effect: Andorra, United Kingdom (without joint adoption (England and Wales) until December 2005, without joint adoption (Scotland) until Sep 2009, without joint adoption (Northern Ireland)) and US state of Connecticut
  - Came into effect: New Zealand (without joint adoption) and US state of California
  - Passed: Switzerland (without adoption) and Slovenia
- Same-sex couple adoption legalisation: UK Subdivisions of England and Wales
- Banning of Same-sex marriage: Latvia, Uganda and Honduras
- Banning of Same-sex marriage and civil unions: US states of Kansas and Texas
- Anti-discrimination legislation: US States of Illinois (private sector, sexual orientation and gender identity) and Maine (private sector, sexual orientation and gender identity).
- Repeal of Sodomy laws: Puerto Rico
- Two gay male teenagers, Mahmoud Asgari and Ayaz Marhoni, are executed in Iran,
- André Boisclair is chosen leader of the Parti Québécois, becoming the first openly gay man elected as the leader of a major political party in North America.
- Pine City, Minnesota holds East-Central Minnesota Pride, the first rural LGBT pride in North America.
- The Roman Catholic Church issues an instruction prohibiting any individuals who "present deep-seated homosexual tendencies or support the so-called 'gay culture'" from joining the priesthood.
- The Simpsons became the first cartoon series to dedicate an entire episode to the topic of same-sex marriage.
- The first European Transgender Council Meeting was held in Vienna.
- Publication of the first human rights report on the situation of intersex people, by the Human Rights Commission of the City and County of San Francisco.
- Eli Cohen became the first openly gay man to be ordained a rabbi by the Jewish Renewal Movement.
- Andrew Goldstein was the first American male team-sport professional athlete to be openly gay during his playing career. He came out publicly in 2003 and was drafted by his hometown team, the Boston Cannons of Major League Lacrosse, in 2005. Goldstein played goaltender for the Long Island Lizards from 2005 to 2007, appearing in two games in 2006.

2006

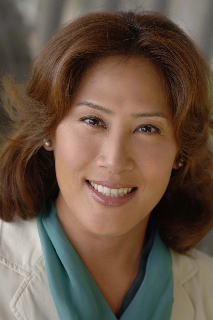
In 2006, Kim Coco Iwamoto became the first transgender official to win statewide office in Hawaii.

- Same-sex marriage laws:
  - Passed and Came into effect: South Africa (with joint adoption)
- Civil Union/Registered Partnership laws:
  - Passed and Came into effect: Czech Republic (without joint adoption)
  - Came into effect: Slovenia
  - Passed: Mexican City of Mexico City and US state of New Jersey
- Limited Partnership laws:
  - Passed: Australian State of South Australia
- Abroad Union recognition: Israel
- Banning of Same-sex marriage: US State of Tennessee
- Banning of Same-sex marriage and civil unions: US States of Alabama, Colorado, Idaho, South Carolina, South Dakota and Virginia, Wisconsin
- Same-sex couple adoption legalisation: Belgium
- Anti-discrimination legislation: Faroe Islands, Germany (sexual orientation and gender identity), New Zealand (gender identity), and US States and Districts of Illinois (sexual orientation), New Jersey (private sector, gender identity), Washington (sexual orientation and gender identity) and Washington, D.C. (private sector, gender identity)
- Voiding of Anti-discrimination legislation: Kentucky
- Equalization of age of consent: Hong Kong, Isle of Man, Serbia
- Marches and Prides: the first homosexual pride march in Moscow ends with violence, the first regional Eastern European Pride is held in Zagreb, Croatia
- Springfield, Missouri repeals gay soliciting laws.
- United States Senate fails to pass the Federal Marriage Amendment.
- The International Conference on LGBT Human Rights is held in Montreal.
- The original Yogyakarta Principles is adopted in Yogyakarta of Indonesia.
- Section 28 "successfully repealed" in Isle of Man
- Chaya Gusfield and Rabbi Lori Klein, both ordained in America, became the first openly lesbian rabbis ordained by the Jewish Renewal movement. Conservative Judaism decided to allow openly lesbian rabbis and cantors. Elliot Kukla, who came out as transgender six months before his ordination in 2006, was the first openly transgender person to be ordained by the Hebrew Union College-Jewish Institute of Religion.
- State Rep. Patricia Todd, D-Birmingham, became Alabama's first openly gay public official when she was elected in 2006.
- Kim Coco Iwamoto became the first transgender official to win statewide office in Hawaii.
- Bernard Lynch became the first Catholic priest in the world to undertake a civil partnership in 2006 in the Republic of Ireland (he had previously had his relationship blessed in a ceremony in 1998 by an American Cistercian monk). He was subsequently expelled from his religious order in 2011, and went on to legally wed his husband in 2016.

2007

- Same-sex marriage laws:
  - Recognition: Aruba, Curaçao and Sint Maarten (Recognition of Dutch same-sex marriages only)
- Civil Union/Registered Partnership laws:
  - Passed and Came into effect: Mexican state of Coahuila
  - Came into effect: Mexican City of Mexico City, Switzerland (without adoption) and US state of New Jersey
  - Passed: Hungary (with adoption), US state of New Hampshire and Uruguay (without adoption until Sep 2008)
- Limited Partnership laws:
  - Passed and Came into effect: US state of Washington and Colombia
  - Came into effect: Australian state of South Australia and US state of Oregon
- Anti-discrimination legislation: United Kingdom (sexual orientation) and US states of Colorado (private sector, sexual orientation and gender identity), Iowa (private sector, sexual orientation and gender identity), Kansas (public sector, sexual orientation and gender identity), Michigan (public sector, gender identity), Ohio (public sector, sexual orientation and gender identity), Oregon (private sector, sexual orientation and gender identity) and Vermont (private sector, gender identity)
- Equalization of age of consent: Portugal, South Africa, UK territory of Jersey, Vanuatu
- Decriminalization of homosexuality: Nepal and New Zealand territory of Tokelau
- Marches and Prides: the first-ever gay pride parade in a Muslim country is held in Istanbul, Turkey;
- Logo cable channel hosts the first presidential forum in the United States focusing specifically on LGBT issues. Six Democratic Party candidates participate in the event. GOP candidates were asked to attend but turned it down.
- Candis Cayne played Carmelita Rainer, a transgender woman having an affair with married New York Attorney General Patrick Darling (played by William Baldwin), on the ABC prime time drama Dirty Sexy Money. The role made Cayne the first openly transgender actress to play a recurring transgender character in prime time.
- On 29 November, the first foreign gay wedding was held in Hanoi, Vietnam between a Japanese and an Irish national. The wedding raised much attention in the gay and lesbian community in Vietnam.
- Jalda Rebling, a German woman born in the Netherlands, became the first openly lesbian cantor ordained by the Jewish Renewal movement.
- Rabbi Toba Spitzer became the first openly lesbian or gay person to head a rabbinical assembly when she was elected president of the Reconstructionist Rabbinical Assembly at the group's annual convention, held in Scottsdale, Arizona.
- Joy Ladin became the first openly transgender professor at an Orthodox institution (Stern College for Women of Yeshiva University).
- Amaranta Gómez Regalado (for México Posible) became the first transsexual person to appear in the Mexican Congress.
- Ellen DeGeneres became the first open lesbian to host the Academy Awards.
- Ventura Place in Studio City was renamed Dr. Betty Berzon Place in her honor, making it the first street ever officially dedicated to a known lesbian in California.
- Theresa Sparks was elected president of the San Francisco Police Commission by a single vote, making her the first openly transgender person ever to be elected president of any San Francisco commission, as well as San Francisco's highest ranking openly transgender official.

2008

- Same-sex marriage laws:
  - Passed and Came into effect: US states of California (May–Nov 2008), Connecticut and Mashantucket Pequot
  - Passed: Norway (with joint adoption)
- Civil Union/Registered Partnership laws:
  - Passed and Came into effect: The Australian Capital Territory, Ecuador (without joint adoption), US state of Washington (expansion of previous legislation)
  - Came into effect: US state of New Hampshire and Uruguay (without joint adoption until Sep 2008)
- Limited Partnership laws:
  - Came into effect: Australian state of Victoria and US state of Oregon
- Banning of Same-sex marriage: US states of Arizona and California
- Banning of Same-sex marriage and civil unions: US state of Florida
- Same-sex couple adoption legalisation: Uruguay
- Banning of Same-sex adoption: Arkansas (struck down by the Arkansas Supreme Court in 2011)
- Anti-discrimination legislation: California
- Decriminalisation of homosexuality: Nicaragua and Panama
- Marches and Prides: the first-ever gay pride parade in Bulgaria
- Matthew Mitcham became the first openly gay athlete to win an Olympic gold medal.
- Kosovo declares itself to be an independent country with a new constitution that includes mention of "sexual orientation", the first of its kind in Eastern Europe
- The first two same-sex civil marriages (two men and two women) take place in Greece on the island of Tilos; the supreme court prosecutor and the minister of Justice claim the marriages are null and void.
- Sam Adams was elected as the first openly gay mayor of Portland, Oregon, which made him the first openly gay mayor of a top-30 U.S. city.
- Annise Parker was elected as the first openly gay or lesbian mayor of Houston, Texas.
- Kate Brown was elected as the Oregon Secretary of State in the 2008 elections, becoming America's first openly bisexual statewide officeholder.
- Silverton, Oregon elected Stu Rasmussen as the first openly transgender mayor in America.
- Angie Zapata, a transgender woman, was murdered in Greeley, Colorado. Allen Andrade was convicted of first-degree murder and committing a bias-motivated crime, because he killed her after he learned that she was transgender. This case was the first in the nation to get a conviction for a hate crime involving a transgender victim. Angie Zapata's story and murder were featured on Univision's "Aqui y Ahora" television show on 1 November 2009.
- The first-ever U.S. Congressional hearing on discrimination against transgender people in the workplace was held, by the House Subcommittee on Health, Employment, Labor, and Pensions.
- Rachel Maddow became the first openly gay or lesbian anchor of a major prime-time news program in the United States when she began hosting The Rachel Maddow Show on U.S. cable network MSNBC.
- Kay Ryan became the first openly lesbian United States Poet Laureate.

2009

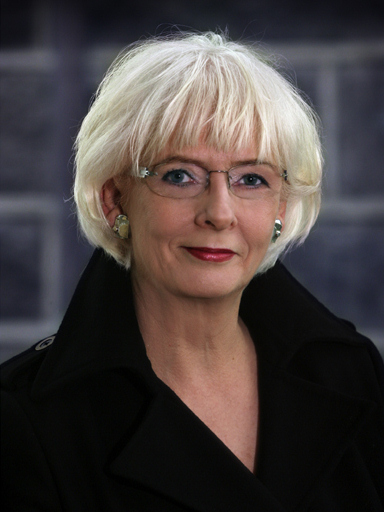
Jóhanna Sigurðardóttir became the prime minister of Iceland in 2009, and thus became the first openly gay head of government in modern times.

- Same-sex marriage laws:
  - Passed and Came into effect: Sweden (with joint adoption), US states of Iowa, and Vermont
  - Came into effect: Norway (with joint adoption) and the Coquille Indian Tribe In 2009 Kitzen and Jeni Branting married in the Coquille Indian tribe's Coos Bay plankhouse, a 3-year-old meeting hall built in traditional Coquille style with cedar plank walls. They were the first same-sex couple to have their marriage recognized by the tribe, of which Kitzen was a member.
  - Passed: Mexican City of Mexico City (with joint adoption), US states and districts of New Hampshire (step adoption only), Maine (never came into effect), Washington, D.C.
- Civil Union/Registered Partnership laws:
  - Passed and Came into effect: Hungary (without joint adoption), Colombia (expansion of previous rights without joint adoption), US states of Nevada and Washington (expansion of previous rights)
  - Passed: Austria (without joint adoption)
- Limited Partnership laws:
  - Passed and Came into effect: US states of Colorado and Wisconsin
- Same-sex couple adoption legalisation: Finland (step adoption), UK Subdivision of Scotland
- Banning of Same-sex marriage: Maine
- Anti-discrimination legislation: Serbia and US state of Delaware (private sector, sexual orientation), USA Matthew Shepard Act (hate crimes). Canadian province Alberta adds "sexual orientation" to human rights legislation—the last jurisdiction in Canada to do so.
- End to ban on gay people in the military: Argentina, Philippines and Uruguay
- The International Transgender Day of Visibility was founded by Michigan-based transgender activist Rachel Crandall Crocker in 2009 as a reaction to the lack of LGBT holidays celebrating transgender people, citing the frustration that the only well-known transgender-centered holiday was the Transgender Day of Remembrance which mourned the loss of transgender people to hate crimes, but did not acknowledge and celebrate living members of the transgender community.
- Politics:
  - Iceland elects the first openly gay head of government in the world, Jóhanna Sigurðardóttir
  - Annise Parker is elected mayor of Houston, Texas, which becomes the largest city in the United States with an openly gay mayor.
  - Diego Sanchez became the first openly transgender person to work on Capitol Hill; he was hired as a legislative assistant for Barney Frank. Sanchez was also the first transgender person on the Democratic National Committee's (DNC) Platform Committee in 2008.
  - Barbra "Babs" Siperstein was nominated and confirmed as an at-large member of the Democratic National Committee, becoming its first openly transgender member.
- Uzi Even and his life partner was the first same-sex male couple in Israel whose right of adoption has been legally acknowledged.
- Welsh rugby star Gareth Thomas becomes the first known top-level professional male athlete in a team sport to come out while still active.
- Carol Ann Duffy was chosen as the first openly lesbian or gay Poet Laureate of the United Kingdom.
- In October 2009, LGBT activist Amy Andre was appointed as executive director of the San Francisco Pride Celebration Committee, making her San Francisco Pride's first openly bisexual woman of color executive director.
- Orthodox Israeli rabbi Ron Yosef became in 2009 the first Israeli orthodox Rabbi to come out, which he did when appearing in Uvda ("Fact"), Israel's leading investigative television program, in an episode regarding conversion therapies in Israel. Yosef remains in his position as a pulpit Rabbi.
- Siddur Sha'ar Zahav, the first complete prayer book to address the lives and needs of LGBTQ as well as straight Jews, was published.

== 2010 ==
- Same-sex marriage laws:
  - Passed and came into effect: Portugal (without joint adoption), Iceland (with joint adoption) and Argentina (with adoption)
  - Came into effect: Mexican City of Mexico City (with joint adoption), US state of New Hampshire (step adoption only) and Washington, D.C.
  - Recognition: The Mexican Supreme Court rules that marriages contracted in Mexico City are valid throughout the country, although no other jurisdiction is required to perform them. Australian State of Tasmania recognises same-marriages performed in other jurisdictions.
  - Other: U.S. state of California, United States District Judge Vaughn Walker strikes down California's Proposition 8 as violative of the United States Constitution's Fourteenth Amendment's Equal Protection and Due Process Clauses.
- Civil Union/Registered Partnership laws:
  - Came into effect: Austria (without adoption and IVF access rights)
  - Passed: Ireland (without adoption rights)
- Limited Partnership laws:
  - Passed and came into effect: Australian state of New South Wales (without joint adoption until Sep 2010)
- Same-sex couple adoption legislation: Australian state of New South Wales and Denmark
- End to ban of same-sex couple adoption: US states of Arkansas and Florida
- End to ban of gay people in the military: Serbia
- End to ban of trans people in the military: Australia
- Decriminalization of homosexuality: Fiji
- Marches and Prides: the first-ever legal gay pride parade in Russia, held in St. Petersburg
- Guinness World Records recognized transgender man Thomas Beatie as the world's "First Married Man to Give Birth."
- Amanda Simpson became the first openly transgender presidential appointee in America when she was appointed as senior technical adviser in the Commerce Department's Bureau of Industry and Security.
- Kye Allums became the first openly transgender athlete to play in NCAA basketball. He was a transgender man who played on George Washington University's women's team.
- Phyllis Frye became the first openly transgender judge appointed in the United States.
- Mary Albing became the first openly lesbian minister ordained by the Evangelical Lutheran Church in America, serving the Lutheran Church of Christ the Redeemer on the south side of Minneapolis.
- Chai Feldblum, who was openly lesbian, became the first openly LGBT person to serve on the EEOC.
- Donna Ryu became the first Asian-American woman, first Korean-American, and first lesbian to be appointed as a judge of the United States District Court, Northern District of California.
- Tyler McCormick became the first openly transgender man, the first wheelchair user, and the first person from New Mexico to win International Mr. Leather.

== 2011 ==
- Same-sex marriage laws:
  - Passed and came into effect: New York and the Suquamish Tribe
- Civil Union/Registered Partnership laws:
  - Came into effect: Ireland (without adoption rights)
  - Passed and came into effect: Isle of Man (with joint adoption), US State of Illinois (with joint adoption rights), Rhode Island and Liechtenstein
  - Passed: US State of Delaware (came into effect 2013) and Hawaii (came into effect Jan 2012)
- End to ban on openly gay, lesbian, and bisexual people in the military: USA (see Don't Ask, don't tell)
- Tony Briffa, believed to be the world's first intersex mayor, elected in the City of Hobsons Bay in the suburbs of Melbourne, Australia, at the end of November.
- Elio Di Rupo, first openly gay male head of government, becomes Prime Minister of Belgium, 6 December.
- Chaz Bono appeared on the 13th season of the US version of Dancing with the Stars in 2011. This was the first time an openly transgender man starred on a major network television show for something unrelated to being transgender.
- Harmony Santana became the first openly transgender actress to receive a major acting award nomination; she was nominated by the Independent Spirit Awards as Best Supporting Actress for the movie Gun Hill Road.
- The Presbyterian Church (U.S.A.) voted to allow the ordination of openly gay and lesbian ministers.
- Rachel Isaacs became the first openly lesbian rabbi ordained by the Conservative movement's Jewish Theological Seminary.
- Petty Officer 2nd Class Marissa Gaeta of California and Petty Officer 3rd Class Citlalic Snell of Los Angeles became the first same-sex couple chosen to share the first kiss upon a U.S. Navy ship's return.
- Brenda Sue Fulton was named to the West Point Board of Visitors, making her the first openly gay member of the board that advises the Academy.
- Miss New York, Claire Buffie, became the first Miss America contestant to campaign for the Miss America title on a gay rights platform.
- Jaiyah "Johnny" Saelua became the first openly transgender international footballer to play in the World Cup when she took the field for American Samoa in Oceania's first round of World Cup qualifiers for Brazil 2014.
- A resolution submitted by South Africa requesting a study on discrimination and sexual orientation (A/HRC/17/L.9/Rev.1) passed, 23 to 19 with 3 abstentions, in the UN Human Rights Council on 17 June 2011. This is the first time that any United Nations body approved a resolution affirming the rights of LGBT people.
- Fred Karger began his unsuccessful run for the 2012 Republican nomination for President, which made him America's first openly gay Republican presidential candidate.
- San Francisco's Human Rights Commission released a report on bisexual visibility, titled "Bisexual Invisibility: Impacts and Regulations"; this was the first time any governmental body released such a report.
- Sandra Lawson became the first openly gay African-American and the first African-American admitted to the Reconstructionist Rabbinical College.

== 2012 ==
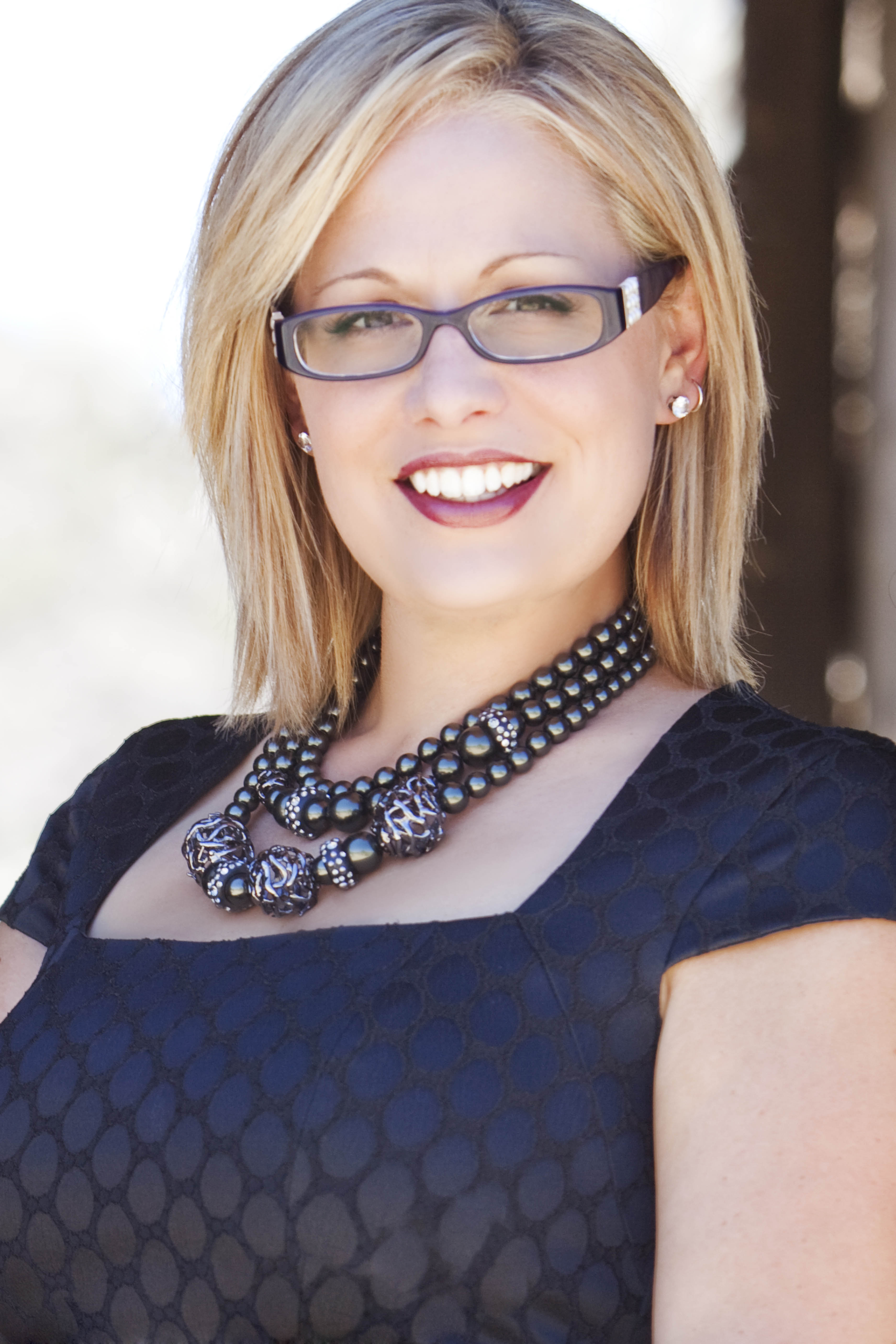
Kyrsten Sinema became the first openly bisexual person elected to the U.S. Congress in 2012.

- Same-sex marriage laws:
  - Passed and came into effect: Denmark, Mexican state of Quintana Roo, U.S. states of Maine and Washington, the Port Gamble S'Klallam Tribe,
  - Passed: U.S. state of Maryland
- Civil Union/Registered Partnership laws:
  - Came into effect: U.S. State of Hawaii
- Decriminalisation of homosexuality: Lesotho and São Tomé and Príncipe
- Anti-discrimination legislation:
  - For sexual orientation and gender identity: Chile
  - The U.S. Dept. of Housing and Urban Development's Office of Fair Housing and Equal Opportunity issued a regulation to prohibit LGBT discrimination in federally assisted housing programs. The new regulations ensure that the Department's core housing programs are open to all eligible persons, regardless of sexual orientation or gender identity.
  - For gender identity: Canadian provinces of Manitoba; and gender expression: Ontario
- Family and Relationships:
  - The first gay Israeli couple was granted a divorce by an Israeli family court. The divorce of Tel Aviv University Professor Avi Even, the first openly gay Knesset member, and Amit Kama was granted on Sunday by the Ramat Gan Family Court, according to Haaretz, which ordered the Interior Minister to register their status as divorced.
  - Taiwan's first same-sex Buddhist wedding was held for Fish Huang and her partner You Ya-ting, with Buddhist master Shih Chao-hui presiding over the ritual.
  - The first same-sex marriage at the U.S. Military Academy was held for a young lieutenant and her partner (Ellen Schick and Shannon Simpson) at the Old Cadet Chapel in West Point's cemetery. Navy Chief Elny McKinney and Anacelly McKinney became the first known same-sex couple to marry on a U.S. military base. They were wed at Naval Base Point Loma in San Diego.
  - The first same-sex couple became engaged in the White House (Ben Schock and Matthew Phelps).
  - Air Force Col. Ginger Wallace became the first known out member of the U.S. military to have their same-sex partner participate in the pinning ceremony tradition that had been reserved for spouses and family members. Her partner of 10 years, Kathy Knopf, pinned colonel wings on Wallace days after the two attended President Obama's State of The Union address as a guest of the First Lady.
- Arts and Culture:
  - Kate McKinnon became Saturday Night Live's first openly lesbian cast member; Danitra Vance never disclosed her sexual orientation publicly, but was revealed to be a lesbian when she died in 1994.
  - On 28 June 2012 Diana King declared "Yes I am a Lesbian" to her fans from her official Facebook page, thus becoming the first Jamaican artist to ever publicly come out.
  - Katie Ricks became the first open lesbian ordained by the Presbyterian Church (U.S.A.)
  - Emily Aviva Kapor, an American rabbi who had been ordained privately by a "Conservadox" rabbi in 2005, began living as a woman in 2012, thus becoming the first openly transgender female rabbi.
  - Rainbow Jews, an oral history project showcasing the lives of Jewish bisexual, lesbian, gay, and transgender people in the United Kingdom from the 1950s until the present, was launched. It is the United Kingdom's first archive of Jewish bisexual, lesbian, gay, and transgender history.
  - ParaNorman, released in 2012, had the first openly gay character in a mainstream animated film.
- Politics:
  - US Politics:
    - Barack Obama became the first U.S. president to publicly announce support for same-sex marriage on 9 May.
    - Marlene Pray joined the Doylestown, Pennsylvania City Council in 2012, though she resigned in 2013; she was the first openly bisexual office holder in Pennsylvania.
    - Tammy Baldwin was elected as the first openly lesbian or gay U.S. Senator.
    - Kyrsten Sinema (D-AZ) became the first openly bisexual person elected to the US Congress.
    - Stacie Laughton became the first openly transgender person elected to any American state legislature when she won a seat in the New Hampshire House of Representatives. However, she resigned from the New Hampshire state legislature before she took office, after it was revealed that she had served four months in Belknap County House of Corrections following a 2008 credit card fraud conviction.
    - Mark Pocan was elected in Wisconsin's 2nd Congressional District, becoming the first openly gay candidate who will follow an openly gay member of the U.S. Congress (in this case Tammy Baldwin).
    - Sean Patrick Maloney became the first openly gay candidate elected to represent New York in Congress.
    - Mark Takano became the first openly gay person of color to win election to the U.S. House. He was elected to represent California's 41st Congressional District.
    - Josh Boschee was elected as North Dakota's first openly gay legislator.
    - Stephen Skinner was elected as West Virginia's first openly gay state legislator.
    - Jacob Candelaria was elected as New Mexico's first openly gay male state legislator.
    - Brian Sims became Pennsylvania's first openly gay state legislator who was out when he was elected. After Brian Sims was elected but before he took office, Rep. Mike Fleck came out as gay, making him Pennsylvania's first openly gay state legislator.
    - David Richardson was elected as Florida's first openly gay state legislator.
    - Colorado Democrats elected Mark Ferrandino as the first openly gay House speaker in state history.
    - Tina Kotek was elected the first openly gay House speaker in the State of Oregon.
    - Richard Grenell was a foreign policy spokesperson for Republican Mitt Romney during Romney's 2012 campaign for president of the United States; this made him the first openly gay individual to work as a spokesperson for a Republican presidential candidate.
- Other
- San Francisco voted to become the first U.S. city to provide and cover the cost of sex reassignment surgeries for uninsured transgender residents.
- Berkeley, California became the first city in the U.S. to officially proclaim a day recognizing bisexuals—23 September as Bisexual Pride and Bi Visibility Day.
- California became the first U.S. state to sign a ban on therapy that claims to convert gay people into heterosexual.
- At a ceremony in Arlington, Army Reserve officer Tammy Smith became the first openly gay, active duty general in American history. Smith was promoted to brigadier general at a private ceremony at the Women's Memorial at Arlington National Cemetery.
- Orlando Cruz became the world's first professional boxer to come out as gay.
- The Bisexuality Report, the first report of its kind in the United Kingdom, was issued. This report, led by Meg Barker (Senior Lecturer in Psychology, OU), Rebecca Jones (Lecturer, Health & Social Care, OU), Christina Richards, and Helen Bowes-Catton and Tracey Plowman (of BiUK) summarizes national and international evidence and brings out recommendations for bisexual inclusion in the future.

== 2013 ==
- Same-sex marriage laws:
  - Passed and came into effect: New Zealand, Uruguay, France, Brazil, the U.S. states of Delaware, Rhode Island, Minnesota, New Jersey, Hawaii and New Mexico, the Confederated Tribes of the Colville Reservation, the Little Traverse Bay Bands of Odawa Indians, the Pokagon Band of Potawatomi Indians, the Cheyenne and Arapaho Tribes, the Leech Lake Band of Ojibwe, the Grand Portage Band of Chippewa and the Iipay Nation of Santa Ysabel,
  - Restored: California
  - Passed: England and Wales and US state of Illinois
  - Passed but then overturned: Australian Capital Territory
  - Came into effect: U.S. State of Maryland
  - Recognition: The Supreme Court of the United States ruled Section 3 of Defense of Marriage Act unconstitutional, thus giving same-sex marriage federal recognition. US state of Oregon
- Civil Union/Registered Partnership laws:
  - Passed and came into effect: Mexican state of Campeche
  - Came into effect: U.S. State of Colorado
- Limited Partnership laws:
  - Passed and came into effect: Costa Rica
- Same-sex couple adoption legalisation: New Zealand and France
- Recriminalisation of homosexuality: India
- Anti-discrimination legislation:
  - For sexual orientation and gender identity: Cyprus and Puerto Rico
  - For gender identity: US state of Delaware; and gender expression: Canadian provinces of Newfoundland and Labrador and Prince Edward Island
- Anti-discrimination executive action: US state of Virginia
- First Pride Marches: In Ukraine; Montenegro; and Curacao.
- Politics:
  - Kathleen Wynne became the first openly LGBT premier of a Canadian province, namely Ontario, after defeating Sandra Pupatello in the third round of voting of the Ontario Liberal party's leadership race on 26 January 2013. Sworn in on 11 February 2013, she is the party's first openly LGBT leader and Ontario's first female premier.
  - Xavier Bettel, first openly gay Prime Minister of Luxembourg, assumes office 4 December.
  - Etienne Schneider, first openly gay Deputy Prime Minister of Luxembourg, assumes office 4 December.
  - Luxembourg becomes the first country in the world to have an openly gay Prime Minister Xavier Bettel and an openly gay Deputy Prime Minister Etienne Schneider.
  - Nikki Sinclaire came out as transgender, thus becoming the United Kingdom's first openly transgender Parliamentarian. Daniel Kawczynski became the first MP in Britain to come out as bisexual.
  - Benjamin Medrano was elected as the first openly gay mayor in Mexico's history, being elected mayor of the township of Fresnillo.
  - The first United Nations ministerial meeting on the rights of lesbian, gay, bisexual and transgender individuals was held. Representatives from the US, France, Argentina, Brazil, Croatia, the Netherlands, Norway, Japan, New Zealand and the EU, along with executive directors of Human Rights Watch and the International Gay and Lesbian Human Rights Commission reaffirmed their commitments to working together to end discrimination and violence towards the LGBT community. UN High Commissioner for Human Rights Navi Pillay delivered remarks [press release] commending the LGBT community and praising the fact that, "many countries have embarked on historic reforms—strengthening anti-discrimination laws, combating hate crime against LGBT people and sensitizing public opinion."
  - US Politics:
    - Barack Obama mentioned the word "gay" and the issue of gay rights for the first time in a speech at the U.S. presidential swearing in; specifically, he did so in his inaugural address.
    - On Celebrate Bisexuality Day, the White House held a closed-door meeting with almost 30 bisexual advocates so they could meet with government officials and discuss issues of specific importance to the bisexual community; this was the first bi-specific event ever hosted by any White House.
    - Rep. Mark Pocan's spouse Philip Frank became the first same-sex spouse of a federal lawmaker to officially receive a House Spouse ID. In 2009, Marlon Reis, the spouse of Rep. Jared Polis (D-Colo.), was issued a congressional spouse ID, but later card services told him that he had been given the designation accidentally.
    - The U.S. Senate confirmed Nitza Quiñones Alejandro to a federal judgeship, making her the first openly gay Latina to hold such a post.
    - U.S. Air Force Under Secretary Eric Fanning took over as acting secretary of the U.S. Air Force, becoming the highest ranking openly LGBT official at the Department of Defense; he is openly gay.
    - Todd Hughes became the first openly gay U.S. circuit judge.
- Sports:
  - Robbie Rogers announced he was gay on 15 February 2013, becoming the only male fully capped international association footballer to do so. He joined the Los Angeles Galaxy, making him the first openly gay male athlete to compete in Major League Soccer.
  - Jason Collins on 29 April 2013, became the first active male professional athlete in a major North American team sport to publicly come out as gay.
  - Fallon Fox came out as transgender, thus becoming the first openly transgender athlete in mixed martial arts history.
  - Jallen Messersmith of Benedictine College in Atchison, Kan., came out and is believed to be the first openly gay player in U.S. men's college basketball.
  - Cason Crane became the first openly gay man to summit the Seven Summits and the first to bring the rainbow flag to the summit of Mount Everest.
  - The first UFC match between two openly gay fighters, Liz Carmouche and Jessica Andrade, was held.
  - Darren Young (real name: Fred Rosser) became the first active professional wrestler to come out as gay.
- Trans:
  - Philadelphia passes one of the most comprehensive transgender rights bills on the city level, which addresses transgender bathroom use and city employee healthcare, making it the first city on the east coast to provide transition related healthcare to its city employees.
  - Autumn Sandeen, a U.S. veteran and transgender woman, received a letter from a Navy official stating, "Per your request the Defense Enrollment Eligibility Reporting System (DEERS) has been updated to show your gender as female effective 12 April 2013." Allyson Robinson of Outserve declared, "To our knowledge, this is the first time that the Department of Defense has recognized and affirmed a change of gender for anyone affiliated, in a uniformed capacity – in this case a military retiree."
  - Ben Barres became the first openly transgender scientist in the US National Academy of Sciences in 2013.
  - For the first time, the California Department of Education's list of recommended books for grades Pre-K-through-12 included a book with a transgender theme, I Am J by Cris Beam.
  - California enacted America's first law protecting transgender students; the law, called the School Success and Opportunity Act, declares that every public school student in California from kindergarten to 12th grade must be "permitted to participate in sex-segregated school programs and activities, including athletic teams and competitions, and use facilities consistent with his or her gender identity, irrespective of the gender listed on the pupil's records."
  - Jennifer Pritzker came out as transgender in 2013 and thus became the world's first openly transgender billionaire.
  - A six-year-old girl named Luana, who was born a boy, became the first transgender child in Argentina to have her new name officially changed on her identity documents. She is believed to be the youngest to benefit from the country's new Gender Identity Law, which was approved in May 2012.
  - Jennifer Finney Boylan was chosen as the first openly transgender co-chair of GLAAD's National Board of Directors.
  - On 31 October 2013 Paris Lees became the first openly transgender panellist to appear on the BBC's Question Time programme, drawing praise from commentators who included former Deputy Prime Minister John Prescott and the Labour Party deputy leader Harriet Harman.
  - Stephen Alexander, of Rhode Island, became the first high school coach to come out publicly as transgender.
  - On 1 November Audrey Gauthier was elected president of CUPE 4041, representing Air Transat flight attendants based in Montreal. She thus became the first openly transgender person elected president of a union local in Canada.
  - Publication of the first parliamentary report on the human rights and health of intersex people, published by the Australian Senate on 25 October.
  - Kristin Beck, formerly Chris Beck, came out as the first openly transgender retired Navy SEAL.
- Family and Relationships:
  - For the first time the U.S. Department of Veterans Affairs decided to allow the same-sex spouse of a military veteran to be buried in a U.S. national cemetery. VA Secretary Eric Shinseki gave permission for retired Air Force officer Linda Campbell, 66, to bury the ashes of her same-sex spouse Nancy Lynchild at Willamette National Cemetery in Oregon.
  - Rehana Kausar and Sobia Kamar, both from Pakistan, became the first Muslim lesbian couple to enter into civil partnership in the United Kingdom.
  - Julian Marsh and Traian Povov become the first married gay couple to have a green card application approved.
  - Master Sgt. Angela Shunk and her wife, Tech. Sgt. Stacey Shunk, became the first same-sex couple to receive an assignment together under the U.S. Air Force's Join Spouse program.
- Arts and Culture:
  - The first same-sex kiss ever on a Eurovision stage occurred at the 2013 Eurovision Song Contest when Krista Siegfrids, who sang "Marry Me", ended her semi-final performance by kissing one of her female dancers.
  - Guy Erwin became the first openly gay bishop to be elected by the Evangelical Lutheran Church in America; he was elected to the Southwest California Synod of the ELCA.
  - The Bi Writers Association, which promotes bisexual writers, books, and writing, announced the winners of its first Bisexual Book Awards. An awards ceremony was held at the Nuyorican Poets Café in New York City.
  - The Directors Guild of America elected Paris Barclay as its first black and first openly gay president.
  - Same Love, a hit single from Macklemore & Ryan Lewis, became the first Top 40 song in the U.S. to promote and celebrate same-sex marriage.
  - Movie director Kim Jho Gwang-soo and his partner Kim Seung-hwan became the first South Korean gay couple to publicly wed, although it was not a legally recognized marriage.
  - Harvey Milk was chosen as the first openly LGBT political official to be featured on an American postage stamp.
  - Andy Herren became the first openly gay winner of the American version of the "Big Brother" reality show.
  - The first televised Romanian same-sex wedding was held. It was between two men, and was done on the reality show Four Weddings and a Challenge.
  - Q Radio, which went on the airwaves in September, claims to be India's first radio station which caters to the country's lesbians, gays, bisexuals and transgender people.
  - Mark C. Goldman became the first openly gay president of the American Conference of Cantors, a Reform Jewish organization.
  - Rabbi Deborah Waxman was elected as the President of the Reconstructionist Rabbinical College. As the President, she is believed to be the first woman and first lesbian to lead a Jewish congregational union, and the first female rabbi and first lesbian to lead a Jewish seminary; RRC is both a congregational union and a seminary.
- Saul Levin was named on 15 May 2013 as the new chief executive officer and medical director of the American Psychiatric Association, making him the first known openly gay person to head the APA.
- Major General Patricia "Trish" Rose became the first openly lesbian two-star general in the U.S. Air Force, and the highest ranking openly gay officer in the entire U.S. military at the time.
- New Jersey became the second state, after California, to sign a ban on therapy that claims to convert gay people into heterosexual.
- Russia's government adopted a federal bill banning the distribution of "propaganda of non-traditional sexual relations" to minors. The law imposes heavy fines for using the media or internet to promote "non-traditional relations".
- San Francisco's first Project Homeless Connect for lesbian, gay, bisexual, and transgender people was held.
- BiLaw, the first American national organization of bisexual lawyers, law professors, law students, and their allies, was founded.

== 2014 ==
- Same-sex marriage laws:
  - Passed and came into effect: Scotland, US states of Oregon, Pennsylvania, Utah, Oklahoma, Virginia, Wisconsin, Indiana, Colorado, Nevada, Idaho, West Virginia, North Carolina, Alaska, Arizona, Wyoming, Kansas, South Carolina, Montana, the Mexican state of Coahuila, the Puyallup Tribe of Indians, the Lac du Flambeau of Lake Superior Chippewa, the Fort McDermitt Paiute and Shoshone Tribes of the Fort McDermitt Indian Reservation, the Fort McDowell Yavapai Nation, the Pascua Yaqui Tribe, the Salt River Pima-Maricopa Indian Community, the San Carlos Apache Tribe, the Wind River Indian Reservation, the Blackfoot Tribe and the Keweenaw Bay Indian Community
  - Passed: Luxembourg
  - Came into effect: England and Wales and US state of Illinois
- Civil Union/Registered Partnership laws:
  - Passed and came into effect: Gibraltar (with joint adoption), Malta (with joint adoption) and Croatia
  - Passed: Estonia
- Same-sex couple adoption legislation: Andorra, the Mexican state of Coahuila
- Decriminalization of homosexuality: Northern Cyprus and Palau
- Criminalization of homosexuality: Brunei
- Banning of same-sex marriage: Nigeria
- Anti-discrimination law for gender identity: Canadian province Saskatchewan
- Family and Relationships:
  - Anna Guillot and Chrissy Kelly, who were married in New York in 2012, became the first same-sex couple in Mississippi to create a public record of their marriage. However, this did not give their marriage legal standing in Mississippi.
  - The marriage of Giuseppe Chigiotti and Stefano Bucci became the first overseas same-sex marriage to be legally recognized in Italy; the two were married in New York in 2012.
  - For the first time, an Italian court granted permission for the adoption of a child living with a gay couple. The child was the biological daughter of one of the women in the couple, and her partner was allowed to legally become her co-parent through adoption.
  - Berlin, Germany unveiled the world's first cemetery for lesbians.
  - Umma Azul was the first child of a lesbian couple to be baptized by the Catholic Church in Argentina.
  - Emilia Maria Jesty, daughter of a lesbian couple, was the first child born in Tennessee to have a woman listed on the birth certificate as her "father."
  - The U.S. Department of Veterans Affairs agreed to give survivor benefits to the first-known same-sex war widow, Tracy Dice Johnson, whose wife Donna Johnson died in a suicide bombing attack in 2012.
  - Both lesbian parents were listed on their children's birth certificates in Australia, which is the first time an Australian birth certificate indicates that both members of a same-sex couple were the legal parents of a child at birth.
  - The U.S. Naval Academy Chapel's first-ever same-sex wedding was held for David Bucher, a 49-year-old Academy graduate who works at the Pentagon, and partner Bruce Moats.
- Trans:
  - The U.S. Equal Employment Opportunity Commission filed the first Title VII action taken by the federal government on behalf of transgender workers. The lawsuits were filed for Amiee Stephens and Brandi Branson, both transgender women.
  - Meghan Stabler became the first openly transgender woman to be named Working Mother magazine's Working Mother of the Year.
  - Laverne Cox was on the cover of the 9 June 2014 issue of Time, and was interviewed for the article "The Transgender Tipping Point". She also became the first openly transgender person to be nominated for an Emmy in an acting category: Outstanding Guest Actress in a Comedy Series for her role as Sophia Burset in Orange Is the New Black.
  - Transgender Studies Quarterly, the first non-medical academic journal devoted to transgender issues, began publication, with Susan Stryker and Paisley Currah as coeditors.
  - Mills College became the first single-sex college in the U.S. to adopt a policy explicitly welcoming transgender students, Mount Holyoke became the first Seven Sisters college to accept transgender students.
  - Blake Brockington became the first openly transgender high school homecoming king in North Carolina.
  - Nina Chaubal and Greta Gustava Martela cofounded Trans Lifeline, the first U.S. suicide hotline dedicated to transgender people.
  - Tona Brown became the first African-American openly transgender woman to perform at Carnegie Hall.
  - The Transgender Trends panel was the first panel on that subject ever held at San Diego Comic-Con.
  - The San Francisco Police academy graduated its first openly transgender police officer, Mikayla Connell.
  - The 100 block of Turk Street in San Francisco was renamed Vicki Mar Lane after trans activist Vicki Marlane.
  - Lauren Lubin ran as the first openly non-binary athlete in the New York City Marathon.
  - Lea T became the face of American hair-care brand Redken, thus making her the first openly transgender model to front a global cosmetics brand.
  - A national Centers for Disease Control and Prevention campaign featured an openly transgender person, Jennifer Barge, as its spokesperson for the first time.
  - Chris Mosier became the first openly transgender man inducted into the National Gay and Lesbian Sports Hall of Fame.
  - Kinnon MacKinnon became the first openly transgender man to earn a gold in powerlifting at the Gay Games in the 2014 Games.
  - BBC2 commissioned Britain's first transgender sitcom, called Boy Meets Girl, which follows the developing relationship between Leo, a 26-year-old man and Judy, a 40-year-old transgender woman.
  - ICEIS Rain became the first openly two-spirit person to perform at the Aboriginal Peoples Choice Music Awards.
  - Padmini Prakash became India's first openly transgender television news anchor.
  - Denmark became the first European country to remove the Gender Identity Disorder diagnosis as a necessary requirement in the gender recognition process.
  - Malta became the first European state to add recognition of gender identity to its constitution as a protected category.
  - The first openly transgender woman got married in Malta.
  - At least 1,000 openly transgender Bangladeshis held Bangladesh's first pride march, to mark one year since the government recognized them as a third gender.
- Sports:
  - The 2014 Winter Olympics in Sochi sparked worldwide protests over host country Russia's crackdown on LGBT rights. Gus Kenworthy won the silver medal in men's freestyle skiing.
  - Conner Mertens, Willamette University's kicker, became the first active college football player to come out as LGBT; he came out as bisexual.
  - UMass basketball player Derrick Gordon came out, thus becoming the first openly gay player in Division I college men's basketball.
  - Michael Sam was drafted by the St. Louis Rams and thus became the first openly gay player to be drafted into the National Football League.
  - The Arizona Interscholastic Association Executive Board approved the first transgender student-athlete to play in a winter sport in Arizona.
  - Edward Sarafin, a backup offensive lineman at Arizona State, became the first active Division I football player to come out as gay.
  - Professional strongman Rob Kearney came out as gay, thus becoming the first openly gay man actively competing in professional, international strongman competitions.
  - The FTM Fitness Conference hosted the first bodybuilding competition for transgender men, the FTM Fitness World Bodybuilding Competition.
  - Derrick Gordon became the first openly gay athlete to play a game in Division I men's basketball.
  - Dale Scott came out as gay in 2014, thus becoming the first openly gay umpire in Major League Baseball.
  - In 2014, Robbie Rogers became the first openly gay male athlete to win a big-time team pro sports title in the United States when the LA Galaxy won the Major League Soccer Cup.
- Arts and Culture:
  - Good Luck Charlie on The Disney Channel became the first TV show on a child-targeting network to feature a same-sex couple (the characters' names were Susan and Cheryl).
  - Finland releases stamps celebrating noted homoerotic artist Tom of Finland.
  - The first Jewish boat participated in the Amsterdam Pride Canal Parade. Marianne van Praag, a Reform rabbi from The Hague, was the only rabbi aboard. The first Moroccan boat also participated in the Amsterdam Pride Canal Parade.
  - Cosmopolitan magazine, a women's magazine, offered sex advice to lesbians for the first time in its history.
  - Pascal Tessier, a 17-year-old from Chevy Chase, Md., became the first known openly gay Boy Scout to be an Eagle Scout.
  - The United Church of Christ was the first religious denomination to be a major sponsor of the Gay Games, as a fourth-tier silver sponsor of Gay Games 9.
  - Maria Walsh came out as gay after being crowned the Rose of Tralee, thus becoming the first openly gay Rose of Tralee.
  - Canadian-based writer and illustrator Eiynah wrote Pakistan's first anti-homophobia children's book, "My Chacha Is Gay"; she first wrote it online and had it released in print in 2014.
  - The memorial honoring LGBT people persecuted by the Nazis in Tel Aviv, the first specific recognition in Israel for non-Jewish victims of the Holocaust, was unveiled in 2014.
  - Mikie Goldstein became the first openly gay man to be ordained as a Conservative Jewish Rabbi.
  - Mikie Goldstein became the Israeli Conservative movement's first openly gay congregational rabbi with his installation as spiritual leader of its synagogue in Rehovot (Congregation Adat Shalom-Emanuel).
  - Family Circle featured a same-sex couple for the first time in its November 2014 issue.
  - Nehirim's first retreat for LGBT rabbis, rabbinic pastors, cantors, and students was held.
  - In 2014 Los Tigres del Norte released the album Realidades, which contains the song "Era Diferente" (meaning "She Was Different") about a lesbian teenager who falls in love with her best friend; according to lead singer and songwriter Jorge Hernandez, this is the first time a norteño group has ever written a gay love song.
- Politics:
  - The UN Human Rights Council adopted a second resolution related to sexual orientation and gender identity on 26 September 2014. It passed by a vote of 25-14 and is the first time in the Council's history that it adopted a resolution on LGBT rights with the majority of its members.
  - Lynne Brown was appointed as the first openly gay cabinet minister in South Africa, which also makes her the first openly gay person to be appointed to a cabinet post in any African government. Zakhele Mbhele became the first openly gay person to serve in South Africa's parliament, which also makes him the first openly gay black member of parliament in any African nation.
  - Petra De Sutter became the first openly transgender person to serve in Belgium's Parliament, specifically its Senate.
  - Luisa Revilla Urcia became the first openly transgender person elected to a public office in Peru when she won a seat on the local council in La Esperanza in the province of Trujillo in northwestern Peru. Later, Carlos Bruce came out and thus became the first openly gay member of Congress in Peru.
  - Edgars Rinkēvičs became the first lawmaker in Latvia to announce he is gay, which also makes him the most prominent openly gay politician in a former Soviet Bloc state.
  - Poland elected its first openly gay city mayor (Robert Biedroń, elected mayor of Słupsk.)
  - Matthew Muir was sworn in as the first openly gay judge to sit on New Zealand's High Court bench.
  - The Labor government in Victoria, Australia appointed Martin Foley as Minister of equality, marking the first time an Australian government has ever had a dedicated Minister overseeing gay, lesbian, bisexual, transgender and intersex issues.
  - Andrew Barr became the first openly gay state government leader in Australia after he was sworn in as chief minister of the Australian Capital Territory (ACT).
  - US Politics:
    - Maite Oronoz Rodriguez became the first openly gay person to be nominated for a seat on Puerto Rico's Supreme Court, and was confirmed for the seat later that year.
    - Darrin P. Gayles became the first openly gay African-American man to be confirmed as a U.S federal judge.
    - Judith Ellen Levy was confirmed by the Senate as the first openly lesbian federal judge in Michigan.
    - Toni Atkins was elected as the first openly lesbian speaker of the California Assembly. She served as acting governor for one day in this capacity.
    - Monica Wehby aired the first campaign ad for American national office featuring a same-sex couple (Ben West and Paul Rummell).
    - Jim Ferlo came out as gay, thus becoming the Pennsylvania Senate's first openly gay legislator.
    - Maura Healey became the first openly gay state attorney general elected in America, elected in Massachusetts.
    - Aditi Hardikar became the first woman of color to serve the White House as their permanent liaison to the LGBT community. She replaced Monique Dorsainvil who had served as the temporary liaison after Gautam Raghavan resigned.
    - Gypsy Vered Meltzer was elected to the City Council in Appleton; as such he became the first openly transgender elected official in Wisconsin.
- Costa Rica flew the gay pride flag at their presidential palace; the International Gay and Lesbian Human Rights Commission said the organization believed it was the first time the gay pride flag had been flown from the offices of a head of state in the Americas.
- Cyprus' first-ever gay pride parade draws several thousands of participants.
- Hong Kong held its first international symposium on LGBTI rights.
- Mauricio Ruiz became the first serving member of the Chilean armed forces to announce he was gay.
- California became the first state in the U.S. to officially ban the use of trans panic and gay panic defenses in murder trials.
- Florida-based bank C1 Financial became the first publicly listed bank in the United States to have an openly gay CEO (Trevor Burgess) when its stock became available to trade in August 2014.
- Tim Cook, the CEO of Apple Inc., came out as gay, thus becoming the first openly gay CEO on the Fortune 500 list.
- A contingent of the group OutVets became the first LGBT organization in history to march in Boston's Veterans Day parade.
- The Bisexual Resource Center, based in Boston, Massachusetts, declared March 2014 as the first Bisexual Health Awareness Month, with the theme "Bi the Way, Our Health Matters Too!"; it included the first social media campaign to address disparities in physical and mental health facing the bisexual community.
- Queen Elizabeth II praised the London Lesbian and Gay Switchboard for their 40-year history making it the first time the Crown has ever publicly supported the LGBT community. They received a comment from the Queen saying: "Best wishes and congratulations to all concerned on this most special anniversary."

== 2015 ==
- Same-sex marriage laws:
  - Passed and came into effect: Ireland, United States [nationwide], the US state of Florida, the Central Council of the Tlingit and Haida Tribes of Alaska, the Oneida Nation of Wisconsin, the Confederated Tribes of Siletz Indians, the Mexican states of Chihuahua, Guerrero and Nayarit
  - Came into effect: Luxembourg (with joint adoption)
  - Passed: Finland
- Civil Union/Registered Partnership laws:
  - Passed and came into effect: Chile, Ecuador (expansion)
  - Passed:Cyprus, Greece
- Same-sex couple adoption legislation: Austria, Ireland
- Decriminalisation of homosexuality: Mozambique
- Anti-discrimination law for gender identity and gender expression: Canadian province of Alberta.
- Politics:
  - Madhu Kinnar became India's first openly transgender person to be elected mayor; she was elected mayor of Chhattisgarh's Raigarh Municipal Corporation.
  - Health Minister Leo Varadkar of Ireland came out as gay, thus becoming the first openly gay government member in the history of Ireland.
  - Canadian politician Wade MacLauchlan won the leadership of the governing Prince Edward Island Liberal Party on 21 February, and was formally sworn in as Canada's second out LGBT, and first out gay male, provincial premier on 23 February. His party subsequently won the provincial election on 4 May, thus also making him the province's first out LGBT member of the Legislative Assembly of Prince Edward Island.
  - Michael Connolly, Ricardo Miranda and Estefania Cortes-Vargas won election to the Legislative Assembly of Alberta as the province's first three openly LGBT MLAs. Cortes-Vargas later came out as genderqueer, and is thus the first out trans person to serve in any Canadian legislature.
  - Nepal adopted its first democratic constitution, which is the first in Asia to specifically protect the rights of lesbian, gay, bisexual and transgender communities.
  - Tamara Adrián was elected to the Venezuelan National Assembly, thus becoming the first openly transgender Venezuelan to be elected to their national legislature, as well as the first openly transgender person in the entire Western Hemisphere to do so.
  - US Politics:
    - Aisha Moodie-Mills became the new president and CEO of the Victory Fund, which made her the first woman, first black woman, first lesbian, and first black lesbian to become the head of a national leading LGBT organization.
    - Pennsylvania State Representative Mark B. Cohen introduced the first transgender rights bills in Pennsylvania's history.
    - Kate Brown became the first openly bisexual governor in the United States, as governor of Oregon.
    - Jackie Biskupski was elected as the first openly gay mayor of Salt Lake City.
    - Nancy VanReece won the Metro Council District 8 seat in Nashville, thus becoming the first out lesbian elected to a legislative body in Tennessee.
    - Robby Mook became the first openly gay manager of a major presidential campaign (Hillary Clinton's campaign.)
    - Randy Berry is appointed the first Special Envoy for the Human Rights of LGBT Persons.
    - President Barack Obama became the first president to use the words "lesbian," "bisexual", and "transgender" in a State of the Union speech.
    - President Obama appointed Raffi Freedman-Gurspan to serve as an Outreach and Recruitment Director in the Presidential Personnel Office, making her the first openly transgender appointee to work inside the White House.
- Arts and Culture:
  - Cambodia got its first LGBT magazine, Q Cambodia.
  - Jamaica held its first LGBT Pride celebrations.
  - Zoey Tur joined INSIDE EDITION as a Special Correspondent during February, thus becoming the first openly transgender television reporter on national TV in America.
  - Thomas Roberts became the first openly gay evening news anchor on network television when he anchored NBC's "Nightly News" for a day.
  - Lance Bass and Michael Turchin became the first same-sex couple to exchange vows on cable television.
  - Screenwriter Jason Rothenberg of The 100 confirmed that that TV show's lead character, Clarke Griffin (played by Eliza Taylor) was bisexual; this makes her the first openly bisexual lead character on the CW network.
  - St. Patrick's Day Parades: The first gay groups (Boston Pride and OutVets) marched in Boston's St. Patrick's Day parade; OUT@NBCUniversal, an organization of gay employees of NBCUniversal, became the first gay group to march in the New York City St. Patrick's Day parade; and The D.C. Center for the LGBT Community became the first gay group to march in the Washington, D.C. St. Patrick's Day parade.
  - The National Executive Board of the Boy Scouts ratified a resolution that removed the national restriction on openly gay adult leaders and employees. Pascal Tessier became the first openly gay adult Boy Scout in the nation to be hired as a summer camp leader when he was hired by the Boy Scouts' New York chapter, Greater New York Councils.
  - In February 2015, Patricia Velásquez released her memoir Straight Walk, discussing her struggles growing up in poverty in Venezuela and how her relationship with Sandra Bernhard made her realize she was a lesbian. This makes her the world's first openly lesbian Latina supermodel.
  - In April 2015, the Rev. Ángel David Marrero is ordained as a pastor in the Evangelical Lutheran Church in America and thus becomes the first openly gay (Caribbean) Latino ordained in this denomination.
  - Andreja Pejic became the first openly transgender model profiled by Vogue, in its May 2015 issue.
  - Laverne Cox (among others) posed nude for the Allure annual "Nudes" issue, becoming the first openly transgender actress to do so. She also became the first openly transgender person to have a wax figure of herself at Madame Tussauds. She also won a Daytime Emmy Award in Outstanding Special Class Special as Executive Producer for Laverne Cox Presents: The T Word. This made her the first openly transgender woman to win a Daytime Emmy as an Executive Producer; as well, The T Word is the first trans documentary to win a Daytime Emmy.
  - Caitlyn Jenner became the first openly transgender woman on the cover of Vanity Fair.
  - Fun Home, the first Broadway musical with a lesbian protagonist, premiered on Broadway.
  - The first American federally approved monument honoring LGBT veterans was dedicated; it is located at the Abraham Lincoln National Cemetery in Elwood, Illinois.
  - On 29 May 2015, the New York City Landmarks Preservation Commission announced it would officially consider designating the Stonewall Inn as a landmark, the first city location to be considered based on its LGBT cultural significance alone. On 23 June 2015, the New York City Landmarks Preservation Commission unanimously approved the designation of the Stonewall Inn as a city landmark, making it the first landmark honored for its role in the fight for gay rights.
  - The Royal Vauxhall Tavern became the first-ever building in the UK to be given a special "listing" status based on its LGBT history; it was accorded Grade II listed status by the UK's Department of Culture, Media and Sport.
  - The UK-based bisexual women's website Biscuit created the Purple List; the first known list of its kind, the Purple List seeks to recognize bisexuals who have contributed to fighting biphobia and increasing bisexual visibility.
  - Jacob Anderson-Minshall became the first openly transgender author to win a Goldie award from the Golden Crown Literary Society; he shared the award for best creative non-fiction book with Diane Anderson-Minshall for Queerly Beloved: A Love Story Across Genders.
  - Audrey Middleton became the U.S. television show Big Brother's first openly transgender houseguest.
  - Scott Turner Schofield became the first openly transgender actor to play a major role on daytime television, as the character Nick on the show The Bold and the Beautiful. On the same show, the character Maya Avant (played by Karla Mosley) became the first transgender bride to be married on daytime television when she married Rick Forrester (played by Jacob Young).
  - Hari Nef became the first openly transgender model signed to IMG.
  - Andrew Guy became Australia's first openly transgender TV host, as a guest presenter on The Project.
  - The first Scottish LGBTI Awards were held.
  - Neil Patrick Harris became the first openly gay man to host the Academy Awards.
  - The first Oscar campaigns for openly transgender actresses supported by a movie producer were launched for actresses Kitana Kiki Rodriguez and Mya Taylor of the movie Tangerine.
  - EastEnders chose Riley Carter Millington as the first openly transgender actor in UK TV soap history; he played 'Kyle', a man who has transitioned from female to male, which Riley did in real life. Shortly after, Hollyoaks cast transgender actress Annie Wallace.
  - Inga Beale, CEO of Lloyd's of London, became the first woman and the first openly bisexual person to be named number one in the OUTstanding & FT Leading LGBT executive power list.
  - Loiza Lamers won "Holland's Next Top Model", making her the first openly transgender winner of the "Top Model" franchise.
  - Mya Taylor won the Gotham Award for Breakthrough Actor, making her the first openly transgender actress to win a Gotham award.
  - In March 2015 Rabbi Denise Eger became the first openly gay president of the Central Conference of American Rabbis, which is the largest and oldest rabbinical organization in North America.
  - Abby Stein came out as transgender and thus became the first openly transgender woman (and the first woman) to have been ordained by an ultra-Orthodox institution, having received her rabbinical degree in 2011 from Yeshiva Viznitz in South Fallsburg, N.Y. However, this was before she was openly transgender, and she is no longer working as a rabbi as of 2016. She is also the first openly transgender woman raised in a Hasidic community, and is a direct descendant of Hasidic Judaism's founder the Baal Shem Tov.
- Family/Relationships:
  - Thomas Sawicki and his boyfriend Shawn Brier became the first male same-sex couple chosen to share the first kiss upon a U.S. Navy ship's return.
  - Mikhail Ivan Gallatinov and Mark Goodwin became the first couple to have a same-sex wedding in a UK prison after marrying at Full Sutton Prison in East Yorkshire.
  - Argentina became Latin America's first nation to recognize same-sex partners and a biological parent on a child's birth certificate; specifically, it allowed a lesbian couple and their son's biological father, who donated sperm for their pregnancy, to be included on the child's birth certificate. The child's name is Antonio and his two mothers are Susana Guichal and Valeria Gaete, and his father is Hernan Melazzi.
  - When President Obama declared May to be National Foster Care Month in 2015, he became the first president to explicitly say gender identity should not prevent anyone from adopting or becoming a foster parent.
  - Shawn MacIver and James Moccia became the first openly gay couple to graduate from a police academy together when they graduated from the Boston Police Academy
  - Tokyo's Shibuya ward passed a local ordinance granting same-sex couples the right to partnership certificates; this makes it the first place in Japan – or anywhere in East Asia – to recognize same-sex partnerships.
  - Ireland became the first country to legalize same-sex marriage by popular vote.
- Trans:
  - On 12 February 2015, USA Today reported that the commandant of Fort Leavenworth wrote in a 5 February memo, "After carefully considering the recommendation that (hormone treatment) is medically appropriate and necessary, and weighing all associated safety and security risks presented, I approve adding (hormone treatment) to Inmate [Chelsea] Manning's treatment plan." According to USA Today, Chelsea Manning remains a soldier, and the decision to administer hormone therapy is a first for the U.S. Army.
  - In a first for the state, California's Department of Corrections was ordered by a federal judge to grant a transgender prisoner (Michelle-Lael Norsworthy) access to gender-affirming surgery.
  - The inaugural White House Trans Women of Color Women's History Month Briefing was held.
  - The U.S. Justice Department announced that it had filed its first civil lawsuit on behalf of a transgender person (Rachel Tudor); the lawsuit was United States of America v. Southeastern Oklahoma State University and the Regional University System of Oklahoma, filed in federal court in that state.
  - Maka Brown, an 18-year-old senior at the Salt Lake School for Performing Arts, was crowned Utah's first openly transgender prom queen.
  - Schools In Transition: A Guide for Supporting Transgender Students in K-12 Schools was introduced; it is a first-of-its-kind publication for school administrations, teachers, and parents about how to provide safe and supportive environments for all transgender students in kindergarten through twelfth grade.
  - Philadelphia flew the transgender pride flag above City Hall for the first time.
  - Manabi Bandopadhyay, India's first openly transgender college principal, began work; she worked as the principal of the Krishnagar Women's College in Nadia district.
  - A transgender man's phalloplasty became the first ever seen on camera, in the Channel 4 documentary Girls to Men.
  - The first U.S. congressional forum on anti-transgender violence was held.
  - The (American) Department of Veterans Affairs opened its first clinic for transgender service members.
  - Aydian Dowling became the first openly transgender man on the cover of Men's Health magazine, as part of a special collector's edition.
- Intersex:
  - In April 2015, Malta became the first country in the world to outlaw sterilization and invasive surgery on intersex people.
- Sports:
  - On 22 May 2015, Michael Sam signed a two-year contract with Montreal Alouettes of the CFL, which made him the first openly gay player in the league's history.
  - Michael Sam made his CFL debut on 7 August 2015, against the Ottawa Redblacks, and thus became the first publicly gay player to play in a CFL regular season game. He did not record a tackle in the game.
  - Chris Mosier became the first known out trans athlete to join a U.S. national team that matched his gender identity, rather than the gender assigned him at birth, when he won a spot on Team USA in the men's sprint duathalon.
  - Sean Conroy became the first openly gay baseball player to appear in a professional game; Conroy pitched nine scoreless innings to lead the Sonoma Stompers to a 7-0 win over the Vallejo Admirals in the Pacific Association of Baseball Clubs, an independent league featuring teams from Northern California.
  - Benjamin Thomas Watt from New Zealand became the first openly gay professional boxing judge.
  - David Denson came out as gay, making him the first active minor league player affiliated with a Major League Baseball organization to do so.
  - Keegan Hirst became the first British rugby league professional to come out as gay.
  - Sam Stanley, nephew of Joe Stanley, became the first English rugby union player to come out as gay.
  - Chris Burns, an assistant coach at Bryant University, came out as gay, thus becoming the first openly gay coach in Division I men's basketball.
  - Breanna Sinclairé became the first openly transgender person to sing the national anthem at a professional sporting event, which she did at a Major League Baseball game.
  - Phuti Lekoloane came out and thus became South Africa's first openly gay male footballer.
- Military:
- Adrianna Vorderbruggen died in combat; she is believed to be the first American active duty, openly gay, female service member to die in combat, and is the first openly gay American Air Force officer to die in combat.

== 2016 ==
- Same-sex marriage laws:
  - Passed and came into effect: Colombia, Isle of Man, The Mexican states of Jalisco, Campeche, Colima, Michoacán and Morelos, Greenland, Gibraltar, British Antarctic Territory
  - Passed: Faroe Islands, Guernsey, Ascension Island
- Civil Union/Registered Partnership laws:
  - Passed and came into effect: Italy, Aruba
  - Came into effect: Estonia
- Same-sex couple adoption legislation: Portugal
- Decriminalisation of homosexuality: Seychelles, Nauru, Belize
- Anti-Discrimination laws for gender identity and gender expression: Canadian provinces of Quebec and British Columbia
- Sports:
  - On 11 February 2016 Adidas announces LGBT clause in athletes' contracts.
  - Amelia Gapin became the first openly transgender woman to be featured on the cover of Women's Running.
  - Chris Mosier was chosen as the first openly transgender athlete to be featured in the "Body Issue" of ESPN The Magazine, and appeared in Nike's first ad with an openly transgender athlete.
  - Caitlyn Jenner became the first openly transgender person on the cover of Sports Illustrated.
  - Amanda Nunes became the UFC's first openly gay champion.
  - Harrison Browne of the National Women's Hockey League came out as a transgender man, which made him the first openly transgender athlete in professional American team sports.
  - Lea T became the first openly transgender person ever to participate in the opening ceremonies of an Olympics when she led the Brazilian team into the stadium on her bike during the 2016 Rio Olympics.
  - The British women's field hockey team won gold at the Olympics; as Kate and Helen Richardson-Walsh were both on that team, this made them the first same-sex married couple to win Olympic medals.
- Politics
  - UK Politics:
    - Hannah Blythyn, Jeremy Miles, and Adam Price became the first openly gay members of the Welsh Assembly.
    - British Government minister Justine Greening revealed that she was in a same-sex relationship, thus becoming the first out LGB female cabinet minister.
    - Anwen Muston was elected to Wolverhampton City Council, making her the first openly transgender woman to be elected as a Labour representative.
    - Prince William became the first member of Britain's royal family to appear on the cover of a gay magazine when he appeared on the cover of the July issue of Attitude; in the cover story, he also became the first British royal to openly condemn the bullying of the gay community.
    - Lord Ivar Mountbatten came out as gay and revealed that he was in a relationship with James Coyle, an airline cabin services director whom he met whilst at a ski resort in Verbier. While not being a member of the British royal family, he is the first member of the extended family to come out as gay.
    - Carl Austin-Behan was sworn in as Manchester's first openly gay Lord Mayor.
    - Nicola Sturgeon becomes the first UK prime minister or First Minister to deliver an address at a Gay Pride event when she appeared at Glasgow Pride 2017. She addressed the crowd vowing to continue fighting for equality and respect throughout the UK, Closing with the statement "Love is Love".
  - US Politics:
    - President Barack Obama appointed Raffi Freedman-Gurspan as the White House's primary LGBT liaison, making her the first openly transgender person in the role.
    - Maite Oronoz Rodríguez became Puerto Rico's first openly gay chief justice and, as such, the first openly gay chief justice in U.S. history.
    - Eric Fanning became the first openly gay Secretary of the United States Army.
    - Santa Clara County became the first county government in the U.S. to raise the transgender pride flag.
    - Trans United Fund was founded; it is the first group of its kind, a 501(c)(4) organization of transgender leaders focused on transgender issues.
    - Misty Plowright became the first openly transgender candidate to win a major party primary for the US House of Representatives.
    - Misty Snow became the first openly transgender candidate to win a major party primary for the US Senate.
    - At the GOP Convention, Peter Thiel became the first person to publicly announce in a speech that he is gay, Rachel Hoff became the first openly gay person to sit on the Republican Party's Platform Committee, and Donald Trump became the first Republican nominee to mention the LGBT community in a GOP nomination address, saying in his acceptance speech at the 2016 Republican National Convention on 21 July 2016: "As your president, I will do everything in my power to protect our LGBTQ citizens from the violence and oppression of a hateful foreign ideology."
    - Sarah McBride was a speaker at the Democratic National Convention, becoming the first openly transgender person to address a major party convention in American history.
    - Hillary Clinton wrote an op-ed for Philadelphia Gay News, which was the first time a major-party presidential candidate wrote an op-ed for an LGBT newspaper, and was the first presumptive presidential nominee from any major party to march in the NYC Pride March.
    - Along with Martha Raddatz, Anderson Cooper moderated the second presidential election debate between Hillary Clinton and Donald Trump. This made him the first openly gay person to moderate a presidential debate.
    - Kate Brown was elected as governor of Oregon, and thus became the first openly bisexual person elected as a United States governor (and indeed the first openly LGBT person elected as such).
  - Indonesia's president Jokowi stated that he is defending the protection of LGBT rights in Indonesia
  - Katherine Zappone became Ireland's first openly lesbian minister.
  - For the first time two openly gay men ran for parliament in Russia.
  - Australian Prime Minister Malcolm Turnbull became the first sitting Australian Prime Minister to attend the Sydney Gay and Lesbian Mardi Gras, also attended by Opposition Leader Bill Shorten.
  - Icelandic President Guðni Th. Jóhannesson became the first president of a country to participate in a pride parade when he gave a speech at Reykjavík Pride 2016 in Iceland.
  - Canadian Prime Minister Justin Trudeau became the first Canadian Prime Minister to march in a pride parade.
  - Geraldine Roman became the first openly transgender woman elected to Congress in the Philippines.
  - The UN Security Council condemned the Orlando nightclub shooting; this statement marked the first time the U.N. Security Council used language recognizing violence targeting the LGBT community.
- Arts and Culture:
  - in August, using a high-altitude balloon, activists launched the first pride flag into the Stratosphere as it floated 21.1 miles (34.1 km).
  - On 24 June 2016, President Barack Obama officially designated the Stonewall National Monument, making it the United States' first National Monument designated for an LGBT historic site. The National Monument status encompasses the Stonewall Inn, Christopher Street Park, and the block of Christopher Street bordering the park.
  - The house at 219 11th St. SE which was home to the Furies Collective was named as the first lesbian-related historic landmark in Washington, D.C. when it was unanimously voted into the D.C. Inventory of Historic Sites.
  - Edificio Comunidad de Orgullo Gay became the first Latino LGBT site on the National Register of Historic Places.
  - The USNS Harvey Milk was officially named at a ceremony in San Francisco on 16 August 2016. It was the first U.S. Navy ship named for an openly gay leader (Harvey Milk, who served as a diving officer in the Navy from 1951 to 1955.)
  - Mya Taylor became the first openly transgender actor to win an Independent Spirit Award; she won for Best Supporting Female.
  - Erin O'Flaherty became the first openly gay Miss Missouri, which also made her the first openly lesbian Miss America candidate.
  - Through her Foundation, Jennifer Pritzker gave a $2 million donation to create the world's first endowed academic chair of transgender studies, at the University of Victoria in British Columbia; Aaron Devor was chosen as the inaugural chair. The United Nations voted to create their first LGBT human rights watchdog.
  - Nur Warsame came out and thus became Australia's first openly gay Imam.
  - The United Methodist church elected its first openly gay bishop, Karen Oliveto.
  - Nicholas Chamberlain was the first bishop in the Church of England to come out as gay, which occurred following threats of an outing from an unnamed Sunday newspaper. He said he lived with his partner in a celibate same-sex relationship, as required by the Bishops' guidelines, under which gay clergy must practice abstinence and may not marry.
  - A Nickelodeon cartoon, called The Loud House, introduced the first animated married same-sex couple to its channel.
  - Elle printed special collectors' covers for their September 2016 issue, and one of them featured Hari Nef, which was the first time an openly transgender woman had been on the cover of a major commercial British magazine.
  - Tracey Norman and Geena Rocero became the first two openly transgender models to appear on the cover of an edition of Harper's Bazaar.
  - Chile's Hugo Alcalde became that country's first gay police officer to have a civil union.
  - The 1st annual World LGBT Conference for Criminal Justice Professionals was held in August of this year with the theme of "To Connect And Inspire".
  - The USNS Harvey Milk was officially named at a ceremony in San Francisco on 16 August 2016. It was the first U.S. Navy ship named for an openly gay leader (Harvey Milk, who served as a diving officer in the Navy from 1951 to 1955.)
- Trans:
  - In January 2016, the Ministry of Health of Chile ordered the suspension of unnecessary normalization treatments for intersex children, including irreversible surgery, until they reach an age when they can make decisions on their own.
  - Nisha Ayub received the International Women of Courage Award in 2016, becoming the first openly transgender woman to receive that award.
  - Aiden Katri, 19, became the first Israeli transgender woman to be jailed for refusing to serve in the military.
  - On 10 June 2016, an Oregon circuit court ruled that a resident, Elisa Rae Shupe, could obtain a non-binary gender designation. The Transgender Law Center believes this to be "the first ruling of its kind in the U.S."
  - An important legal victory for transgender people occurred in April 2016, when the 4th U.S. Circuit Court of Appeals ruled in favor of transgender male student Gavin Grimm, which marked the first ruling by a U.S. appeals court to find that transgender students are protected under federal laws that ban sex-based discrimination. The ruling came on a challenge to the Gloucester County School Board's policy of making transgender students use alternative restroom facilities.
  - It was announced on 30 June 2016 that, beginning on that date, otherwise qualified United States service members could not any longer be discharged, denied reenlistment, involuntarily separated, or denied continuation of service because of being transgender.
  - Israel held its first transgender beauty pageant, which was called "Miss Trans Israel", and was held at a club in Tel Aviv.
- Family/Relationships:
  - The ceremonial first kiss shared between a sailor and their partner after returning from active duty in the Canadian Navy was done by two men for the first time.
  - An anonymous couple held the first same-sex wedding in Cyprus, while Marios Frixou and Fanos Eleftheriades held the first public same-sex wedding in Cyprus.
  - Tom Swann and Guillermo Hernandez became the first same-sex couple to marry in a United States federal immigration detention center.
  - The first Jewish same-sex wedding ceremony in Latin America was celebrated in Buenos Aires; the wedding was for Victoria Escobar and Romina Charur and was officiated by Rabbi Karina Finkielstein.
  - In the first such ruling in Italy, a lesbian couple won the right to legally adopt each other's biological children.
  - Luke Carine and Zak Tomlinson became the first same-sex couple to get married on the Isle of Man.
  - Mexico had rallies for and against marriage equality.
  - 250,000 pro-gay marriage protesters gathered at Ketagalan Boulevard, Taipei, Taiwan the main artery around the presidential office Less than a week earlier, 80,000 people protested against same-sex marriage in Taipei, with an additional 90,000 across the country.
  - Rare LGBT protest held in Lebanon on 16 May 2016.

== 2017 ==
- Same-sex marriage laws:
  - Came into effect: Ascension Island, Faroe Islands, Finland
  - Passed and came into effect: Australia, Bermuda (temporarily repealed from 2 June 2018 – 23 November 2018), Germany, Guernsey, Falkland Islands, Malta, Saint Helena, Tristan da Cunha, the Mexican states Chiapas, Baja California and Puebla
  - Supreme Court Ruling: Austria (to take effect by 1 January 2019), Taiwan (to take effect by 24 May 2019)
  - Passed: Alderney
- Criminalization of homosexuality: Chad
- Anti-discrimination and hate crime law:
  - Canada passed bill C-16, which bans discrimination against trans people and recognizes bias against trans people as an aggravating factor in crime (hate crime); the province of New Brunswick, and the territories of Nunavut and Yukon also passed laws banning discrimination against trans people and allowing people to change their legal gender without surgery, meaning trans people are now protected from discrimination in all provinces and territories.
  - India: Supreme Court of India rules that the right to privacy is intrinsically protected under Article 21 and Part 3 of the Constitution of India, and lambasts the reasoning behind the earlier 2013 Supreme Court ruling Suresh Kumar Koushal v. Naz Foundation for its dismissal of LGBT rights as "so-called" and of LGBT persons as "a miniscule [sic] fraction of the country's population" in its reinstatement of Section 377 of the IPC. The new ruling protects sexual orientation as a constitutional "sanctity" of privacy alongside "preservation of personal intimacies", "family life, marriage, procreation, the home" and "a right to be left alone". The ruling leaves room for a stronger legal challenge against Section 377.
- Arts and Culture:
  - In the 2017 live-action adaptation of Beauty and the Beast, Le Fou is gay, making him the first gay character in a Disney film.
  - Marshall Bang became the first singer in Korea to debut as an openly gay musician.
  - Queer British Art show leads Tate 2017 programme.
  - The January 2017 issue of National Geographic has a 9-year-old transgender girl on the cover (Avery Jackson); she is thought to be the first openly transgender person on National Geographics cover.
  - Ellen Hart, who is openly lesbian, became the first openly LGBT writer to be named a Grand Master by the Mystery Writers of America.
  - Joe Maldonado became the first openly transgender member of the Boy Scouts of America. In 2016, he was rejected from the Cub Scouts for being transgender, but this policy was changed in 2017 after his story became nationally known.
  - Gabrielle Tremblay became the first openly transgender actress ever nominated for a Canadian Screen Award, as Best Supporting Actress for her role in Those Who Make Revolution Halfway Only Dig Their Own Graves (Ceux qui font les révolutions à moitié n'ont fait que se creuser un tombeau).
  - Brazilian model Valentina Sampaio became the first openly transgender model on the cover of French Vogue.
  - Martina Robledo became the first openly transgender woman to act as a trophy presenter at the Grammys.
  - Moonlight became the first LGBT-related film to win the Best Picture award at the Oscars.
  - M Barclay became the first openly non-binary trans person to be commissioned as a Deacon in the United Methodist Church.
  - Alex Hai came out as a transgender man, thus becoming the first openly transgender gondolier in Venice.
  - Ryan Atkin became the first openly gay official in English soccer.
  - San Francisco 49ers assistant coach Katie Sowers came out as gay, thus becoming the NFL's first openly LGBT coach, and the first openly LGBT coach in all of U.S. men's professional sports.
  - Scott Frantz became the first openly gay college football player to play in a game for an NCAA Division I Football Bowl Subdivision school.
  - In August 2017, the first West Africa LGBT-Inclusive religious gathering occurred. Over 30 participants indigenous to ten West African countries, including Benin, Nigeria, Ghana, Sierra Leone, Liberia, The Gambia, Burkina Faso, Côte d'Ivoire, Mali, and Togo participated in an interfaith diversity event hosted by Interfaith Diversity Network of West Africa with the theme of "Building Bridges, Sharing Stories, Creating Hope"
  - MOGA, a Muslim Women's fashion designer becomes the first fashion designer in the world to release a rainbow hijab.
- Politics:
  - Jess Herbst, mayor of New Hope, came out as transgender and thus became the first known openly transgender elected official in Texas history.
  - Japan became the first country in the world to elect an openly transgender man to a public office when Tomoya Hosoda was elected as a councilor for the city of Iruma.
  - Candice Jackson is appointed the first openly gay Deputy Assistant Secretary for Strategic Operations and Outreach in the Office for Civil Rights of the United States Department of Education.
  - Two openly gay candidates were elected to the Anchorage Assembly (Christopher Constant and Felix Rivera), becoming the first openly LGBT elected officials in Alaska.
  - Andy Street became the United Kingdom's first openly gay directly elected metro mayor.
  - Leo Varadkar became the new Taoiseach (Prime Minister) of Ireland and leader of the Fine Gael party, after winning 51 of the 73 votes in the parliamentary party. He was the first openly gay Taoiseach, as well as the youngest and the first of half-Indian descent.
  - Paul Feinman became the first openly gay judge on the New York Court of Appeals.
  - Ana Brnabić was elected as the first openly gay (and first female) prime minister of Serbia, and was the first head of government of any Balkan country to attend a gay pride march; she attended one in Belgrade.
  - Alice Weidel was elected as the first openly gay (and first female) co-chair of Alternative for Germany and was elected to Federal Diet of Germany.
  - Danica Roem was elected as Virginia's first transgender lawmaker.
  - Andrea Jenkins became the first openly transgender black woman elected to public office in the United States when she was elected to the Minneapolis City Council.
  - Tyler Titus, a transgender man, became the first openly transgender person elected to public office in Pennsylvania when he was elected to the Erie School Board. He and Phillipe Cunningham, elected to the Minneapolis City Council on the same night, became the first two openly trans men to be elected to public office in the United States.
  - Allison Ikley-Freeman was elected as Oklahoma's first lesbian lawmaker.
  - America's first all-LGBT city council was elected in Palm Springs, consisting of three gay men, a transgender woman and a bisexual woman.
  - Taiwan's Constitutional Court declared the statutory ban on same-sex marriage in Taiwan's Civil Code was "in violation of both the people's freedom of marriage as protected by Article 22 and the people's right to equality as guaranteed by Article 7 of the Constitution." The accompanying official press release from the court stated that if the Legislature fails to amend the law within the two-year time frame, then "two persons of the same-sex...may apply for marriage registration [and] shall be accorded the status of a legally recognized couple, and then enjoy the rights and bear the obligations arising on couples".
- Trans:
  - Denmark became the second country in the world to officially remove transgender identities from its list of mental health disorders.
  - The Unitarian Universalist Association's General Assembly voted to create inclusive wordings for non-binary, genderqueer, gender fluid, agender, intersex, two-spirit and polygender people, replacing the words "men and women" with the word "people." Of the six sources of the living tradition, the second source of faith, as documented in the bylaws of the denomination, now includes "Words and deeds of prophetic people which challenge us to confront powers and structures of evil with justice, compassion, and the transforming power of love."
  - Philippa York, formerly Robert Millar, came out as transgender, thus becoming the first former professional cyclist to have publicly transitioned.
  - Ines Rau became the first openly transgender Playboy Playmate.
  - The United States Defense Health Agency for the first time approved payment for sex reassignment surgery for an active-duty U.S. military service member. The patient, an infantry soldier who identifies as a woman, had already begun a course of treatment for gender reassignment. The procedure, which the treating doctor deemed medically necessary, was performed on 14 November at a private hospital, since U.S. military hospitals lack the requisite surgical expertise.
- Charitable Services United Kingdom:
  - Melton Mowbray in Leicestershire, United Kingdom got its first youth provision specifically aimed at LGBTQ+ young people. LGBT Melton was established on 21 January and opened its doors for the first time a few weeks later on 6 March. LGBT Melton was founded by Anthony Marvin who has been recognised for his efforts and his support for the LGBTQ+ by receiving the Leicester Pride Unsung Hero Award. LGBT Melton has expanded its services to the wider county of Leicestershire and Rutland.

== 2018 ==
- Same-sex marriage laws:
  - Passed and came into effect: Jersey
  - Came into effect: Alderney, Bermuda (after Supreme Court decision)
  - Supreme Court ruling: Costa Rica (to take effect by 26 May 2020)
- Decriminalisation of homosexuality: Trinidad and Tobago, India
- The prime minister of the UK, Theresa May, issues an apology expressing "deep regret" for Britain's role in imposing colonial laws that criminalize LGBT people across the Commonwealth and the legacy of violence and discrimination that persists today. At the time of the apology, 36 of 53 Commonwealth countries still had colonial-era criminalization laws.
- Arts and culture
  - Wyatt Pertuset became the first openly gay college football player to score a touchdown.
  - This year was the first time in the history of the Winter Olympics that male athletes competed who were openly gay.
  - Silvia Vasquez-Lavado became the first openly gay woman to complete the Seven Summits, the tallest mountain on each continent from both the Messner and Bass lists.
  - On 9 June, around 30 to 40 researchers, 12 of whom identified as LGBT, held the first Pride celebration at a bar in McMurdo Station in the Ross Dependency, making it the first pride celebration in Antarctica.
  - Stav Strashko became the first openly transgender actress ever to receive an Ophir Award nomination for Best Actress.
  - Sandra Lawson was ordained and thus became the first openly gay, female, black rabbi in the world.
  - Adam Rippon became the United States' first openly gay athlete ever to qualify for any Winter Olympics. That year he won an Olympic bronze medal as part of the figure skating team event, thus becoming the first openly gay U.S. athlete to win a medal at the Winter Olympics.
  - Canadian Women's Hockey League player Jessica Platt came out as a transgender woman, making her the first transgender woman to come out in North American professional hockey.
  - Daniel Hall and Vinny Franchino became the first active-duty, same-sex couple to marry at West Point.
  - Yance Ford and Joslyn Barnes were nominated for the Academy Award for Best Documentary Feature for producing Strong Island, which he also directed. As such, Ford was the first openly transgender man to be nominated for any Academy Award, and the first openly transgender director to be nominated for any Academy Award.
  - Laverne Cox became the first openly transgender person to appear on the cover of any Cosmopolitan magazine (specifically, Cosmopolitan South Africa's February 2018 issue)..
  - Paris Lees became the first openly transgender woman featured in British Vogue.
  - Holland, the first openly gay K-pop singer, debuted his first single, "Neverland."
  - Dee Rees and Virgil Williams were nominated for the Academy Award for Best Adapted Screenplay for Mudbound, which made Rees the first queer black woman to be nominated for any Academy Award in a writing category; she was a lesbian.
  - Rachel Morrison became the first woman ever nominated for the Academy Award for Best Cinematography, and thus, as she was a lesbian, the first lesbian as well.
  - Canadian Eric Radford became the first openly gay man to win a gold medal at any Winter Olympics.
  - Jhon Botia Miranda was consecrated as a pastor by Bishop Juan Cardona and thus became the first openly gay pastor consecrated in the Colombian Methodist Church, as well as the first in all of Latin America in the Methodist Church.
  - Love, Simon was released as the first film ever released by a major studio to focus on a gay teenage romance.
  - Todd Harrity came out as gay, thus becoming the first openly gay professional male squash player in the world.
  - Raquel Pennington faced Amanda Nunes on 12 May 2018 at UFC 224 in a UFC Women's Bantamweight Championship bout. Pennington lost the fight via TKO in the fifth round. This was the first event in UFC history to be headlined by two openly gay fighters.
  - The Vatican used the acronym LGBT in an official document for the first time.
  - Sue Bird and Megan Rapinoe became the first same-sex couple on the cover of ESPN's Body Issue.
  - Sharon Afek became the Israel Defense Forces' first openly gay major general.
  - Land O'Lakes named Beth Ford its first female CEO, making her the first openly gay woman CEO to run a Fortune 500 company.
  - Bradley Kim of the Air Force Academy came out as gay, thus becoming the first openly gay football player to play for any military academy in the United States.
  - Mike Jacobs became the first sitting judge in the United States to come out as bisexual.
  - A bill was signed into law designating the LGBTQ Veterans Memorial at the Desert Memorial Park as California's official LGBTQ veterans memorial. Due to this, California became the first state in the nation to officially recognize LGBTQ military veterans.
  - Tadd Fujikawa came out as gay during a post on Instagram, becoming the first male professional golfer to publicly come out as gay.
  - Yance Ford and Joslyn Barnes were awarded an Emmy for Exceptional Merit in Documentary Filmmaking for producing Strong Island, which made Ford the first openly transgender man and the first black openly transgender person to win an Emmy award, as well as the first openly transgender filmmaker to win a Creative Arts Emmy.
  - Lord Ivar Mountbatten married his same-sex partner, James Coyle, on 22 September 2018, becoming the first member of the British monarch's extended family to have a same-sex wedding.
  - America's first citywide Bi Pride event was held, in West Hollywood.
  - Patricio Manuel became the first openly transgender male to box professionally in the United States, and, as he won the fight, the first openly transgender male to win a pro boxing fight in the U.S.
  - Cast members of The Prom performed at the Macy's Thanksgiving Day Parade, ending their performance with the Macy's Thanksgiving Day Parade's first same-sex kiss.
  - Ariel Nicholson became the first openly transgender model to walk in a Calvin Klein fashion show.
- Politics
  - Jacinda Ardern became the first prime minister of New Zealand to march in a gay pride parade.
  - Toni Atkins succeeded Kevin de León as Senate President Pro Tempore. This made her the first woman and the first openly LGBT person (she was a lesbian) to lead the California State Senate.
  - Christine Hallquist became the first openly transgender candidate for governor nominated by a major political party in the United States when she was nominated for governor of Vermont by the Democrats.
  - Mike Jacobs became the first sitting judge in the United States to come out as bisexual.
  - Kyrsten Sinema became the first openly bisexual person to win a major party nomination to run for a U.S. Senate seat.
  - Kyrsten Sinema became the first openly bisexual person elected to the U.S. Senate.
  - Graça Fonseca became the first openly gay government minister in Portugal.
  - Xavier Bettel became the first openly gay Prime Minister in the world to be re-elected for a second term.
  - Etienne Schneider became the first openly gay deputy Prime Minister in the world to be re-elected for a second term.
  - Jared Polis won election as governor of Colorado, becoming the first openly gay person elected governor of any US state. (He is not, however, the first gay person to serve as a state governor; on 12 August 2004, Jim McGreevey, 52nd of New Jersey, came out as gay after being elected, but resigned during his term. Likewise, in 2016, Kate Brown, who is bisexual, was elected Governor of Oregon and became the first openly LGBT person to be elected Governor in the US.)
  - Sharice Davids was elected as the first openly gay Native American in the US Congress, the first openly LGBTQ member of the Kansas congressional delegation, and the first openly gay person representing Kansas on the federal level.
  - Angie Craig became the first openly lesbian mother to be elected to the US Congress, and the first openly gay person elected to Congress from Minnesota.
  - Ahmad Zahra was elected to Fullerton city council, thus becoming the first openly gay Muslim to be elected to office in the USA
  - Chris Pappas became the first openly gay person representing Congress for New Hampshire.
  - Katie Hill was elected as California's first openly bisexual person, and first openly queer woman, to be a member of Congress.
  - Ricardo Lara was elected as California's insurance commissioner, making him the first openly gay person elected to statewide office in California's history.
  - Megan Hunt, who was openly bisexual, became the first openly LGBTQ person elected to the state legislature of Nebraska.
- Trans
  - Angela Ponce made history on 29 June 2018 as the first openly transgender woman to be crowned Miss Spain, and became the first openly transgender contested at Miss Universe.
  - Laverne Cox became the first openly transgender person to appear on the cover of any Cosmopolitan magazine (specifically, Cosmopolitan South Africa's February 2018 issue)..
  - Paris Lees became the first openly transgender woman featured in British Vogue.
  - Transgender Health reported that a transgender woman in the United States breastfed her adopted baby; this was the first known case of a transgender woman breastfeeding.
  - Canadian Women's Hockey League player Jessica Platt came out as a transgender woman, making her the first transgender woman to come out in North American professional hockey.
  - Yance Ford and Joslyn Barnes were nominated for the Academy Award for Best Documentary Feature for producing Strong Island, which he also directed. As such, Ford was the first openly transgender man to be nominated for any Academy Award, and the first openly transgender director to be nominated for any Academy Award.
  - Daniela Vega became the first openly transgender person in history to be a presenter at the Academy Awards.
  - Marvia Malik became the first openly transgender newsreader to appear on Pakistani television in 2018.
  - Peppermint made her Broadway debut in The Go-Go's-inspired musical Head Over Heels. The show began previews on 23 June 2018 and officially opened 26 July; playing the role of Pythio, Peppermint became the first trans woman to originate a principal role on Broadway.
  - Christine Hallquist became the first openly transgender candidate for governor nominated by a major political party in the United States when she was nominated for governor of Vermont by the Democrats.
  - Yance Ford and Joslyn Barnes were awarded an Emmy for Exceptional Merit in Documentary Filmmaking for producing Strong Island, which made Ford the first openly transgender man and the first black openly transgender person to win an Emmy award, as well as the first openly transgender filmmaker to win a Creative Arts Emmy.
  - Patricio Manuel became the first openly transgender male to box professionally in the United States, and, as he won the fight, the first openly transgender male to win a pro boxing fight in the U.S.
  - Colombia prosecuted a transgender woman's murder as a femicide for the first time in 2018, sentencing Davinson Stiven Erazo Sánchez to twenty years in a psychiatric center for "aggravated femicide" a year after he killed Anyela Ramos Claros, a transgender woman.
  - Jesse James Keitel played TV Land's first non-binary character on Younger.
  - Lucy Clark came out as a transgender woman, thus making her the first openly transgender soccer referee in history.

== 2019 ==
- Same-sex marriage laws:
  - Came into effect: Austria
  - Passed and came into effect: Taiwan (first in Asia); Mexican states of San Luis Potosí, Hidalgo and Baja California Sur
  - Supreme court ruling: Ecuador and Mexican states of Nuevo León and Aguascalientes
- Civil union laws:
  - Came into effect: San Marino
  - Passed: Monaco
  - Court order not yet implemented and subject to appeal: Cayman Islands
- Decriminalisation of homosexuality: Angola, Botswana
- Criminalisation of homosexuality passed or came into effect: Brunei, Gabon
- Equalization of age of consent: Canada, Bermuda
- Anti-Discrimination Laws: San Marino (constitutional amendment)
- Politics:
  - US Politics:
    - Pete Buttigieg became the first-ever openly gay Democratic presidential candidate in American history and the first in a nationally televised American presidential debate.
    - Army Capt. Alivia Stehlik, Navy Lt. Cmdr. Blake Dremann, Army Capt. Jennifer Peace, Army Staff Sgt. Patricia King and Navy Petty Officer 3rd Class Akira Wyatt became the first openly transgender members of the United States military to testify publicly in front of Congress.
    - On 2 April 2019 Lori Lightfoot was elected Chicago, Illinois' first openly gay mayor.
    - Satya Rhodes-Conway was elected Madison, Wisconsin's first openly gay mayor.
    - Jane Castor was elected as Tampa, Florida's first openly gay mayor.
    - Utah County Commissioner Nathan Ivie came out as gay, making him the first openly gay Republican officeholder in Utah history.
    - Donald Trump became the first Republican president to acknowledge LGBT Pride Month, which he did through tweeting.
    - The governors of New York, Michigan, Wisconsin, Colorado, and California fly the LGBT pride flag from their state capitals or governor's office buildings for the first time during LGBT Pride Month.
    - In November 2019, transgender community leader Lauren Pulido raised the transgender pride flag over the California state capitol for Trans Day of Remembrance, reportedly the first time the transgender flag was raised over a state capitol building in the United States.
  - World Politics:
    - Ahead of the 2019 Tunisian presidential election, lawyer and LGBT activist Mounir Baatour became the first openly gay male candidate to run for President in Tunisia and the Arab world.
    - Serbian Prime Minister Ana Brnabić's partner Milica Đurđić gave birth to a boy; Brnabić is therefore believed to be the first prime minister in a same-sex couple whose partner gave birth while the prime minister was in office.
    - Gianmarco Negri was elected mayor of Tromello, making him Italy's first openly transgender mayor.
    - In June 2019, President of Austria Alexander Van der Bellen became the first Head of State to address a EuroPride parade.
    - In June, Minister of Education, Science and Research Iris Eliisa Rauskala came out as lesbian and announced that she is married to a woman, thus becoming the first openly LGBT minister in the Government of Austria.
    - Amir Ohana became the first openly gay person to be appointed as a minister in the Israeli government.
    - Nitzan Horowitz successfully challenged incumbent Tamar Zandberg for the leadership of Meretz, which made Meretz the first Israeli party to elect an openly gay person as its leader.
    - Boris Johnson becomes Prime Minister of the UK on 23 July 2019, becoming the first British Prime Minister to have attended a Pride Parade (in 2008 and 2010).
    - On 17 August 2019, in an op-ed to the Ottawa Citizen, Jim Watson announced that he was coming out of the closet, becoming Ottawa's first openly gay mayor.
    - Taiga Ishikawa was elected to the House of Councillors in the 2019 Japanese House of Councillors election, becoming the first openly-gay man to be elected to either chamber of the National Diet.
    - Prince Harry and Meghan Markle became the first British royals known to celebrate LGBT Pride Month.
- Arts and Culture:
  - On 23 August 2019, The New York Times reported a complaint against Anne McClain through the Federal Trade Commission accusing her of illegally accessing financial information while residing in the International Space Station. This accusation "outed" McClain as a LGBT woman, making her the first openly LGBT NASA astronaut.
  - Bernd Mönkebüscher became the first Catholic priest in Germany who outed himself in public without problems by his bishop, in February 2019.
  - Pierre Valkering became the first Catholic priest in the Netherlands who outed himself in public.
  - Ek Ladki Ko Dekha Toh Aisa Laga was released; it was the first mainstream Indian film to deal with a lesbian relationship.
  - Co-director of Avengers: Endgame Joe Russo (credited as Gozie Agbo) has a cameo appearance in that film as a man grieving the sudden loss of a loved one, which is the first time an openly gay character has been portrayed in a Marvel Cinematic Universe film.
  - Lucia Lucas, normally based in Germany, made her debut as Don Giovanni with the Tulsa Opera, becoming the first openly transgender person to sing a lead role in a standard operatic work in the US.
  - Rocketman premiered; the film made Paramount the first major Hollywood studio to show gay male sex onscreen.
  - Daniel Atwood became the first openly gay Orthodox person to be ordained as a rabbi; he was ordained by the rabbi Daniel Landes, in Jerusalem.
  - Nigeria's first lesbian-focused documentary film premiered; it is called "Under the Rainbow," and largely focuses on the life of Pamela Adie, an out Nigerian lesbian.
  - Leyna Bloom's feature film debut in Port Authority at the Cannes Film Festival was the first time a trans woman of color was in a leading role in the festival's history.
  - Janet Mock signed a three-year deal with Netflix giving them exclusive rights to her TV series and a first-look option on feature film projects; this made her the first openly transgender woman of color to secure a deal with a major content company.
  - North Macedonia had its first gay pride march.
  - Bosnia and Herzegovina's first pride event was held on 9 September 2019 in the capital Sarajevo.
  - The Discovery Family cartoon series My Little Pony had a same-sex couple on the show for the first time; this occurred in the episode "The Last Crusade," with a lesbian couple, Aunt Holiday and Auntie Lofty.
  - After a performance of The Prom at Broadway's Longacre Theatre, Broadway's first-known onstage wedding occurred on that stage; it was a wedding between two women, and was Broadway's first-known onstage same-sex wedding.
  - Univision premiered its first gay-led primetime telenovela, entitled El corazón nunca se equivoca (The Heart is Never Wrong).
  - Songs of Praise showed its first gay wedding, which was the wedding of Jamie Wallace and Ian McDowall at the Rutherglen United Reformed Church in Glasgow.
  - Bachelor in Paradise featured its first same-sex romance.
  - Lil Nas X came out as gay, making him the first artist to have done so while having a number-one record. He later became the first openly gay man to be nominated at the Country Music Association Awards.
  - Albert Nabonibo came out as gay, making him Rwanda's first openly gay gospel singer.
  - Billy Porter was nominated for and won the Primetime Emmy Award for Outstanding Lead Actor in a Drama Series for Pose, becoming the first openly gay black man to be nominated and win in any lead acting category at the Primetime Emmys.
  - A Little Late with Lilly Singh premiered on 16 September 2019; as such, Singh became the first late-night host to ever publicly identify as bisexual.
- Trans:
  - Meghan Stabler became the first openly transgender member of Planned Parenthood's National Board of Directors. The Advocate editors named Meghan as one of The Advocate magazine's 2019 Champions of Pride.
  - Indya Moore became the first openly transgender person to be featured on the cover of the U.S. version of Elle magazine.
  - Zach Barack became the first openly transgender actor in the Marvel Universe when he played a classmate of Peter Parker's in Spider-Man: Far From Home.
  - Laverne Cox was one of fifteen women chosen by guest editor Meghan, Duchess of Sussex to appear on the cover of the September 2019 issue of British Vogue; this made Cox the first openly transgender woman to appear on the cover of British Vogue.
  - Valentina Sampaio was hired by Victoria's Secret as their first openly transgender model in August 2019.
  - MJ Rodriguez became the first openly transgender woman to win Best Actress - Television at the Imagen Awards.
  - Teddy Quinlivan became the first openly transgender model to be hired by Chanel.
  - Angelica Ross became the first openly transgender person to host an American presidential forum.
  - Mattel launched the world's first line of gender-neutral dolls, which they marketed as Creatable World.
  - Swe Zin Htet became the first openly lesbian woman to compete in Miss Universe. Patricia Yurena Rodríguez of Spain competed in Miss Universe 2013, but did not come out until after the competition.
  - London's first Trans Pride march was held.
- Sports:
  - Megan Rapinoe became the first openly gay woman in the annual Sports Illustrated swimsuit issue.
  - Andy Brennan became the first male Australian soccer player to come out as gay.
  - Dutee Chand became the first Indian athlete to publicly state that she is in a same-sex relationship.
  - Nyla Rose became the first openly transgender woman to sign with a major American professional wrestling promotion when she signed with All Elite Wrestling (AEW).
  - Alison van Uytvanck and Greet Minnen, both from Belgium, became the first openly gay couple to team up in the doubles at Wimbledon.
  - June Eastwood became the first openly male-to-female transgender athlete to compete in NCAA Division I cross country; she competed for the University of Montana women's team.
  - Amanda Sauer-Cook became the first openly gay referee to work in a major professional football league, when she served as a center judge for the Alliance of American Football.

== 2020 ==
- Same-sex marriage laws:
  - Came into effect: Northern Ireland, Costa Rica
  - Passed and came into effect: Sark, Mexican state of Tlaxcala
    - Nevada became the first U.S. state to constitutionally protect same-sex marriage.
- Civil union laws:
  - Came into effect: Monaco, Cayman Islands
  - Passed: Montenegro
- Decriminalisation of homosexuality: Gabon,
  - Sudan abolished the death penalty and flogging for homosexuality.
- Anti-Discrimination laws: United States (Supreme Court Ruling), Switzerland, Barbados, North Macedonia, Marshall Islands
- Politics
  - US Politics
    - Pete Buttigieg became the first openly gay candidate to win an American presidential primary or caucus.
    - Richard Grenell briefly served as acting director of national intelligence in the Trump administration, making him the first openly gay person to serve in a U.S. cabinet-level position.
    - Peyton Rose Michelle Theriot won election in Louisiana to the women's Democratic State Central Committee seat for the 46th District (seat A), representing St. Martin, Iberia and St. Landry, becoming the first out transgender woman elected to a political position in the state.
    - Karine Jean-Pierre became the first openly gay woman to serve as a vice presidential chief of staff.
    - Stormie Forte became the first openly LGBTQ woman to serve on the Raleigh City Council.
    - Malcolm Kenyatta, Sam Park, and Robert Garcia became the first openly gay speakers in a keynote slot at a Democratic National Convention.
    - Sarah McBride became the first transgender state senator elected in the United States.
    - Mondaire Jones and Ritchie Torres became the first openly gay black men elected to Congress. This also made Torres the first openly gay Afro Latino elected to Congress.
    - Taylor Small became the first transgender person elected to the Vermont General Assembly.
    - Mauree Turner became the first non-binary state legislator elected in the United States.
    - Stephanie Byers became the first Native American transgender person elected to office in America, when she was elected to the Kansas state House of Representatives; she is a member of the Chickasaw Nation. This election also made her the first transgender person elected to the Kansas state legislature.
    - Joe Biden became the first president-elect to mention the transgender community in a victory speech.
    - Christy Holstege became the first openly bisexual mayor in America, as mayor of Palm Springs, California.
    - Alex Lee became the California State Assembly's first openly bisexual member.
    - Ryan Fecteau became the first openly-gay person to serve as Speaker of the Maine House of Representatives.
    - Sean Patrick Maloney became the first openly gay person to be elected as chair of the Democratic Congressional Campaign Committee.
    - Martin Jenkins was sworn in as the first openly gay Justice of the California Supreme Court.
    - Todd Gloria was elected as San Diego's first openly gay mayor.
    - President Joe Biden named Pete Buttigieg as his nominee to be Secretary of Transportation, making him the first openly gay cabinet nominee in U.S. history.
    - David Ortiz became the first openly bisexual person elected to serve in Colorado as a legislator.
  - World Politics
    - UK MP Layla Moran revealed in an interview that she is pansexual; she is believed to be the first UK parliamentarian to come out as pansexual.
    - Petra De Sutter was sworn in as one of seven deputy prime ministers in the government of Belgian Prime Minister Alexander De Croo, becoming Europe's first transgender deputy prime minister, and the most senior trans politician in Europe.
- Sports
  - Levi Davis came out as bisexual, making him the first professional rugby union player to come out as bisexual while still playing.
  - Katie Sowers became the first female and first openly gay offensive assistant in a Super Bowl.
  - Curdin Orlik became the first athlete in the sport of Schwingen to come out as gay, and also the first openly gay male active in Swiss professional sports.
  - Sebastian Vega came out as gay, making him the first openly gay professional basketball player in Argentina.
  - Chris Mosier became the first openly transgender male athlete to ever compete in an Olympic trial alongside other men; however, he was unable to finish the race due to injury.
  - Megan Youngren became the first openly transgender athlete to compete at the Olympic marathon trials in U.S. history.
  - Camille Balanche became the first out lesbian to win the UCI Downhill Mountain Biking World Championship.
  - Mara Gómez became the first trans footballer to play in a top-flight Argentinian league.
  - FaZe Clan's Soleil 'Ewok' Wheeler came out as transgender, making him the first transgender male on a T1 esports organization.
  - American rugby player Devin Ibanez came out as gay, making him the first openly gay Major League Rugby player.
  - Nyla Rose won the AEW Women's World Championship on Dynamite, becoming the first openly transgender woman to win a world championship in a major United States wrestling promotion.
- Arts & Culture
  - Out was released; it is Disney's and Pixar's first short to feature a gay main character and storyline.
  - Luz Noceda and Amity Blight of The Owl House became Disney's first animated canonically LGBT+ female regular characters.
  - The Christmas House, the first Hallmark movie to prominently feature a same-sex couple, premiered.
  - The Christmas Setup became the first LGBTQ-themed Christmas film ever broadcast by Lifetime.
  - Big Sky premiered, making Jesse James Keitel the first nonbinary actor to play a nonbinary series regular on primetime television.
  - Benson from Kipo and the Age of Wonderbeasts became the first character to have an explicit coming out as gay in an all-ages animation series.
  - Diana Zurco became Argentina's first openly transgender newscaster.
  - Camila Prins became the first openly transgender woman to lead the drum section of a top samba school in the Carnival parade in Sao Paulo.
  - Valentina Sampaio became the Sports Illustrated Swimsuit Issue's first openly transgender model in 2020.
  - Rachel Slawson became the first openly bisexual contestant to compete for the Miss USA title.
  - The Lesbian and Gay Big Apple Corps became the first LGBTQ marching band to perform in the Macy's Thanksgiving Day Parade.

== 2021 ==
- Same-sex marriage
  - Approved by referendum: Switzerland (to come into effect in July 2022)
  - Passed and came into effect: Mexican states of Baja California (codification), Sonora, Sinaloa, Querétaro, Guanajuato (by government decree), Zacatecas
  - Passed and pending: Chile (comes into effect March 2022), Mexican state of Yucatan
- Civil union: Montenegro (came into effect)
  - Civil union expansion: San Marino
- Decriminalisation of homosexuality: Bhutan
- Anti-discrimination laws: came into effect in Angola (protections with regard to sexual orientations for employment, discrimination and hate crimes), Namibia (court ruling), Botswana (2019 court ruling upheld by Supreme Court)
- Politics
  - Kamala Harris became the first sitting American Vice President to participate in an LGBTQ+ Pride march (the Capital Pride Walk in Washington, D.C.)
  - Eduardo Leite came out in July 2021 making him the first openly gay governor in Brazil's history.
  - Nicholas Yatromanolakis became the first openly gay person to hold a ministerial rank in the government of Greece.
  - Pete Buttigieg became the first openly gay non-acting member of the Cabinet of the United States, and the first openly gay person confirmed by the Senate to a Cabinet position.
  - Aung Myo Min became the first openly gay cabinet minister in the government of Myanmar.
  - Alexandra Briem became the first openly transgender political officeholder in Iceland after being elected President of the Reykjavík City Council.
  - Christy Abizaid became the first openly gay director of the National Counterterrorism Center.
- Arts & Culture
  - Gottmik became the first openly transgender man to compete on RuPaul's Drag Race.
  - Tashnuva Anan Shishir became Bangladesh's first openly transgender news anchor.
  - Elliot Page became the first openly trans man to appear on the cover of Time magazine.
  - On 3 February 2021, TJ Osborne came out as gay, making him the first openly gay artist signed to a major country music label.
  - Patti Harrison became the first known transgender actor to appear in a Disney animated film, due to voicing the small part of Tail Chief in Raya and the Last Dragon.
  - Rachel Levine was confirmed 24 March as U.S. assistant secretary for health, making her the first openly trans person confirmed by the U.S. Senate for a U.S. federal government position.
  - Martine Delaney became the first openly transgender woman inducted into the Tasmanian Honour Roll of Women.
  - Joe Biden became the first American president to issue a formal presidential proclamation recognizing the Transgender Day of Visibility.
  - Adrian Hanstock was made the temporary Chief Constable of the British Transport Police, making him the first openly gay man to be chief of police of a British police force.
  - Alana Gisele Banks became the first Black openly transgender woman elected to a public school board in the United States.
  - Jonathan Bennett and Jaymes Vaughan became the first gay couple to cover the magazine The Knot.
  - Megan Rohrer was instated as a Bishop in the Evangelical Lutheran Church of America, becoming the first openly transgender and non-binary bishop in any Christian denomination.
  - The American version of Dancing with the Stars featured its first same sex dance partnership
  - Pennsylvania governor Tom Wolf became the first governor in the United States to issue a statement recognizing Bisexual Pride Day.
  - The character of Bia was introduced as the first openly transgender Amazon in DC Comics' Wonder Woman series.
  - Ariel Nicholson became the first openly transgender person to be featured on the cover of Vogue.
- Sports
  - Colton Underwood came out as gay on 14 April 2021, making him the first openly gay Bachelor lead in the franchise's history. He is also the second openly gay NFL free agent to come out after Michael Sam.
  - Carl Nassib came out as gay on 21 June 2021, making history as the first openly gay active NFL player.
  - Canadian Luke Prokop, who was drafted by the Nashville Predators in the 2020 NHL entry draft, became the first active player signed to a National Hockey League contract to come out as gay.
  - In 2021, at the 2020 Tokyo Olympics, Quinn became the first openly transgender, non-binary athlete to compete at the Olympics, the first to medal, and the first to earn a gold medal.

== 2022 ==
- Same-sex marriage
  - Passed and came into effect: Slovenia (July 2022 in effect, October 2022 codification), Cuba (referendum), Mexico (Nationwide, following legalization in the states of Durango, Guerrero, Mexico, Tabasco, Tamaulipas, Veracruz and Yucatán)
  - Came into effect: Chile, Switzerland
  - Passed and Pending: Andorra
  - Codified: United States (Respect for Marriage Act)
- Limited recognition of same-sex unions: Several Japanese prefectures (Aomori, Akita, Fukuoka, Tochigi, Tokyo) and municipalities
- Decriminalization of Homosexuality: Antigua & Barbuda, Saint Kitts and Nevis, Singapore, Barbados
- Anti-Discrimination Law: Spain, Nevada (The measure Question 1 formally appeared on Nevada's ballot within November 2022, and was given 58% approval from voters - making Nevada the first US state in history to approve adding the words "sexual orientation and gender identity or expression" to its state-based Constitution.)
- Equalization of age of consent: Chile
- Politics
  - In March 2022, the Committee on the Elimination of Discrimination against Women found that laws criminalizing consensual same-sex activity between women are a human rights violation. This case, brought by Rosanna Flamer-Caldera, was the first United Nations case to focus on lesbian and bisexual women.
  - Jowelle de Souza became the first openly transgender parliamentarian (specifically a Trinidad and Tobago senator) in the Caribbean.
  - Jamie Wallis came out as transgender, becoming the first openly transgender MP in the House of Commons of the United Kingdom.
  - Karine Jean-Pierre became the first openly lesbian White House Press Secretary.
  - Kamala Harris became the first sitting American vice president to speak at an LGBTQ+ Pride Festival (D.C.'s Capital Pride Festival).
  - The first LGBTQ+ Pride Month reception hosted by a sitting American vice president at their residence was hosted by Kamala Harris.
  - Duda Salabert and Erika Hilton became the first two openly transgender people elected to the National Congress of Brazil, with both of them elected to its Chamber of Deputies.
  - George Santos ran against Democrat Robert Zimmerman; Santos and Zimmerman were both openly gay, making this the first instance of two openly gay candidates competing against one another in a general election for a seat in the U.S. Congress.
  - George Santos became the first openly gay non-incumbent Republican elected to the U.S. Congress.
  - Becca Balint became the first openly gay person elected to represent Vermont in Congress.
  - Leigh Finke became the first openly transgender person elected to Minnesota's legislature.
  - Erin Maye Quade and Clare Oumou Verbeten became the first openly LGBTQ women and first Black women elected to the Minnesota state Senate.
  - James Roesener became the first openly transgender man to win election to any state legislature in the United States upon being elected to New Hampshire's 22nd state House District, Ward 8.
  - Alicia Kozlowski became the first openly non-binary person elected to the Minnesota legislature.
  - SJ Howell became the first openly non-binary person elected to the Montana legislature.
  - Amir Ohana was elected Speaker of the Knesset, becoming the first openly LGBT person in that position in Israeli history.
  - Davante Lewis became the first openly LGBTQ person elected to state office in Louisiana.
  - Corey Jackson became the first openly gay black person elected to California's state legislature.
  - Maura Healey was elected as Massachusetts' first openly gay governor, and America's first openly lesbian governor.
  - Eric Sorensen became the first openly gay man to be elected to Congress from Illinois.
  - Erick Russell was elected Connecticut state treasurer, and thus became the first openly gay African American elected to a statewide office in the United States.
  - Jolanda Jones became the first openly gay black person elected to the Texas state legislature.
  - First time that openly-LGBT candidates were running for office in all U.S. states in a single general election.
- Arts and Culture
  - Willow Pill became the first openly transgender person to win a regular season of RuPaul's Drag Race in the United States.
  - L. Morgan Lee became the first openly transgender person nominated for a Tony Award in an acting category; she was nominated for Best Performance by a Featured Actress in a Musical for playing Thought 1 in A Strange Loop.
  - Ariana DeBose became the first queer woman of color and the first Afro-Latina to win an Oscar for acting, which she won for her role as Anita in the 2021 remake of West Side Story directed by Stephen Spielberg.
  - Peppa Pig introduced its first same-sex couple, Penny Polar Bear's mothers, in the episode "Families".
  - Bros was released; it was the first gay romantic comedy from a major studio featuring an entirely LGBTQ principal cast.
  - In September 2022, Molly Kearney was announced as the first out non-binary cast member of Saturday Night Live.
  - With the song "Unholy", Kim Petras became the first openly transgender woman to reach number one on the Billboard Hot 100, and Sam Smith became the first openly non-binary person to reach number one on the Billboard Hot 100.
  - Amy Schneider became the first openly transgender person to compete in, and to win, the "Jeopardy!" Tournament of Champions.
  - Walt Disney Animation Studios' introduced its first openly LGBTQ main character, by having an openly gay main character in the film Strange World.
  - The first LGBTQ-led Hallmark Channel Christmas movie, The Holiday Sitter, premiered.
  - Dani Oliva, a transgender man, became the first openly transgender executive at a major music company, as Venice Music's Vice President of Legal and Business Affairs.
- Sports
  - Carl Nassib became the first openly gay player in an NFL playoff game on 15 January 2022.
  - Swimmer Lia Thomas became the first openly transgender athlete to win an NCAA Division I national championship in any sport, after winning the women's 500-yard freestyle with a time of 4:33.24.
  - Ryan Resch came out while working for the Phoenix Suns, making him the first openly gay person in league history to work basketball operations in an NBA front office.
  - Igor Benevenuto became the first FIFA-ranked soccer referee to come out as gay.
  - Peter Caruth came out as gay, becoming the first Irish men's international hockey player to do so.
  - Nadezhda Karpova became the first openly gay Russian national team athlete.
  - Travis Shumake became the first openly gay driver to compete in a national event on the National Hot Rod Association racing circuit.
  - Ellia Green became the first Olympian to come out as a trans man.
  - Jamie Hunter became the first openly transgender snooker player to win a women's tour ranking event in snooker when she won the U.S. Women's Open.
  - Zander Murray became Scotland's first senior male soccer player to announce he was gay.
  - Anthony Bowens became the first openly gay wrestler to be an All Elite Wrestling champion.
  - Lucas Krzikalla came out as gay, making him the first openly gay player in Handball-Bundesliga, and the first active male player in a professional team sport in Germany to come out as gay.
  - Byron Perkins of Hampton University came out as gay, making him the first openly gay football player at any Historically Black College or University.
  - Isaac Humphries came out as gay, which made him the first Australian male basketball player and first player in the National Basketball League to be openly gay.
  - Justine Lindsay became the first openly transgender person to make a National Football League Cheerleading team when she joined the Carolina TopCats.
  - For the first time, the New York City Marathon awarded prize money for non-binary athletes, with a top prize of $5,000 for the fastest non-binary finisher. The prize money for the non-binary category was awarded by New York Road Runners, whereas the World Marathon Majors awarded prize money for athletes in the male and female gender categories.
  - Jai Vidal became the first openly gay male wrestler to sign with Impact Wrestling.
- Other
  - Kristin Crowley became the first openly gay (and the first female) chief of the Los Angeles Fire Department.
  - Petros Levounis was elected as the first openly gay president of the American Psychiatric Association.
  - Therese Stewart was confirmed as the first openly lesbian presiding justice on any California appellate court; specifically, she was confirmed as presiding justice of the 1st District Court of Appeal's Division Two.
  - The Hebrew Union College – Jewish Institute of Religion for the first time granted a certificate of ordination to a nonbinary candidate.

== 2023 ==
- Same-sex marriage
  - Passed: Estonia
  - Came into effect: Andorra
- Civil union
  - Passed: Latvia
- Same-sex adoption: Taiwan
- Decriminalization of Homosexuality: Cook Islands, Mauritius
- Criminalization of Homosexuality: The Anti-Homosexuality Act, 2023 of Uganda prescribes up to twenty years in prison for "promotion of homosexuality", life imprisonment for "homosexual acts", and the death penalty for "aggravated homosexuality".
- Politics
  - Edgars Rinkēvičs became the first openly gay head of state in Latvia and the European Union following his election as a president by the Saeima on 31 May 2023.
  - Sylvia Swayne announced her candidacy for the Alabama House of Representatives, becoming the first openly transgender woman to run for public office in Alabama.
  - Toni Atkins became the first openly LGBT person to sign a bill into law in California.
  - Laphonza Butler became the first black out lesbian in Congress, the first openly LGBT member of the U.S. Senate from California and its first out black LGBT member, when she was sworn in on 3 October 2023.
  - Stefanos Kasselakis became the first openly gay leader of a major political party in Greece, upon being elected the leader of Syriza.
  - Rue Landau became the first openly gay person elected to the Philadelphia City Council.
- Arts & Culture
  - Kim Petras (and Sam Smith) won the 2023 Grammy Award for Best Pop Duo/Group Performance for "Unholy", making Petras the first openly transgender artist to win a major-category Grammy Award.
  - Hogwarts Legacy introduced the Harry Potter franchise's first transgender character, Sirona Ryan.
  - Rikkie Kollé won the Miss Nederland 2023 beauty pageant, becoming the first openly transgender person to win a national beauty pageant.
  - Ezra Miller became the first openly nonbinary person to play the lead role in a major superhero franchise film, doing so in The Flash, which was released in 2023.
  - The character Lake of the 2023 film Elemental was Pixar's first non-binary character.
  - Yosha Iglesias fulfilled the requirements for the Woman International Master title in December, becoming the first openly transgender person to qualify for the title.
  - Hallmark's first lesbian holiday romance, called Friends and Family Christmas, premiered.
  - Lío Mehiel became the first openly trans actor to win the Sundance Dramatic Special Jury Award for Best Acting, for his performance in Mutt.
  - Marina Machete became the first Portuguese openly transgender woman to participate in the Miss Universe contest; she represented Portugal at the Miss Universe 2023 pageant in El Salvador and finished as a top 20 semifinalist, becoming the first openly trans woman to place.
- Sports
  - Campbell Johnstone revealed in an interview with Hilary Barry on New Zealand television show Seven Sharp that he is gay, making him the first openly gay All Black rugby player.
  - The nonbinary division of the Boston Marathon was first included in 2023; it was won by Kae Ravichandran with a time of 2:38:57.
  - Kevin Maxen, an assistant strength and conditioning coach for the Jaguars, came out as gay, making him the first openly gay male coach in major American men's professional sports.
  - Quinn became the first openly transgender and non-binary footballer at the FIFA World Cup.
  - Che Flores became the first out nonbinary trans referee in a major professional sports league in the United States (specifically, the NBA).
  - On 17 November 2023, Luke Prokop became the first openly gay player in the American Hockey League's history, by making his first appearance in a game as a player for the Milwaukee Admirals.
- Other
  - Jesse Ehrenfeld became the first openly gay president of the American Medical Association, being sworn in as such on 13 June 2023.
  - Seth Marnin became the first openly transgender judge in New York and the first openly transgender male judge in the United States.
  - Danica Roem was elected to the Virginia Senate, becoming the first openly transgender person to be elected to a state senate in the Southern United States.
  - The Seoul High Court decided that the state's health insurer – the National Health Insurance Service – should provide spousal coverage to a same-sex couple. This marked the first time any court recognized the rights of a same-sex couple in South Korea.
  - The Olivera Fuentes vs. Peru case was the first reported case of discrimination based on sexual orientation in the Peruvian justice system that reached the Inter-American Court of Human Rights, and its ruling, issued in 2023, was also the first in the entire inter-American system in favor of a complainant for being discriminated against for their sexual orientation by a consumer company.
  - Jeanne Marrazzo was named as the first openly gay director of the National Institutes of Health's National Institute of Allergy and Infectious Diseases (NIAID).
  - On 17 September 2023, Jeff R. Johnson was elected as the first openly gay bishop of the Sierra Pacific Synod.
  - On 1 October 2023, the Black Cat Tavern became California Historical Landmark #1063, with a marker designating it as such being unveiled, which made it the first marker for a California Historical Landmark associated with LGBTQ history.

== 2024 ==
- Same-sex marriage
  - Passed: Liechtenstein, Thailand
  - Passed and came into effect: Greece
  - Came into effect: Estonia
- Civil union
  - Came into effect: Latvia
- Decriminalization of homosexuality: Dominica, Namibia, Niue
- Criminalization of homosexuality: Iraq, Mali
- Politics
  - Luanne Peterpaul became the first out lesbian in the New Jersey legislature.
  - Huang Jie was elected as the first openly gay member of the Legislative Yuan.
  - Gabriel Attal became the first openly gay Prime Minister of France, also making him the eighth openly LGBT head of government in Europe.
  - Danica Roem became the first openly transgender person to be elected to and serve in both chambers of a state legislature (specifically, Virginia’s) in U.S. history.
  - Monica Márquez became the first openly gay Chief Justice of the Colorado Supreme Court.
- Arts & Culture
  - Colman Domingo became the first American openly gay man to receive an Academy Award nomination for playing a gay character.
  - Asher HaVon became the first openly LGBTQ person to win The Voice.
  - At the 2024 Cannes Film Festival, Karla Sofía Gascón won the Best Actress prize, shared jointly with her costars Selena Gomez, Adriana Paz and Zoe Saldaña, making Gascón the first openly trans actor to win a major prize at Cannes.
  - The pride flag flew above Los Angeles City Hall for the first time.
  - Bailey Anne Kennedy became the first openly transgender woman to be crowned Miss Maryland USA.
  - Nava Mau received an Emmy nomination for supporting actress in a limited or anthology series or movie, making her the first openly trans woman to be nominated for that category of the Primetime Emmys.
- Sports
  - Andrew Mortensen, of Texas, became the first openly gay man to officially cycle around the world, which he did non-continuously from 2020 until 2024.
- Other
  - Stacie Gregory became the first openly LGBTQ+, and the first openly lesbian, police chief of Sausalito, California.
  - Manvi Madhu Kashyap became India's first openly transgender sub-inspector.

== 2025 ==
- Same-sex marriage
  - Came into effect: Liechtenstein, Thailand
- Civil union
  - Constitutional Court Ruling: Lithuania
- Criminalization of homosexuality: Burkina Faso, Trinidad and Tobago
- Decriminalization of homosexuality: Saint Lucia
- Politics
  - Poland ended its LGBT-free zone policy.
  - Sarah McBride became the first openly transgender member of the U.S. House of Representatives.

== 2026 ==
- Decriminalization of homosexuality: Trinidad and Tobago
- Criminalization of homosexuality: Niger
- Politics
  - Rob Jetten became the first openly gay Prime Minister of the Netherlands, also making him the ninth openly LGBT head of government in Europe.

== See also ==
- LGBT rights in the 19th century
- List of LGBTQ firsts by year
- Timeline of LGBTQ history
- Timeline of LGBT history, 20th century
- Timeline of transgender history
