= LGBTQ rights in the 19th century =

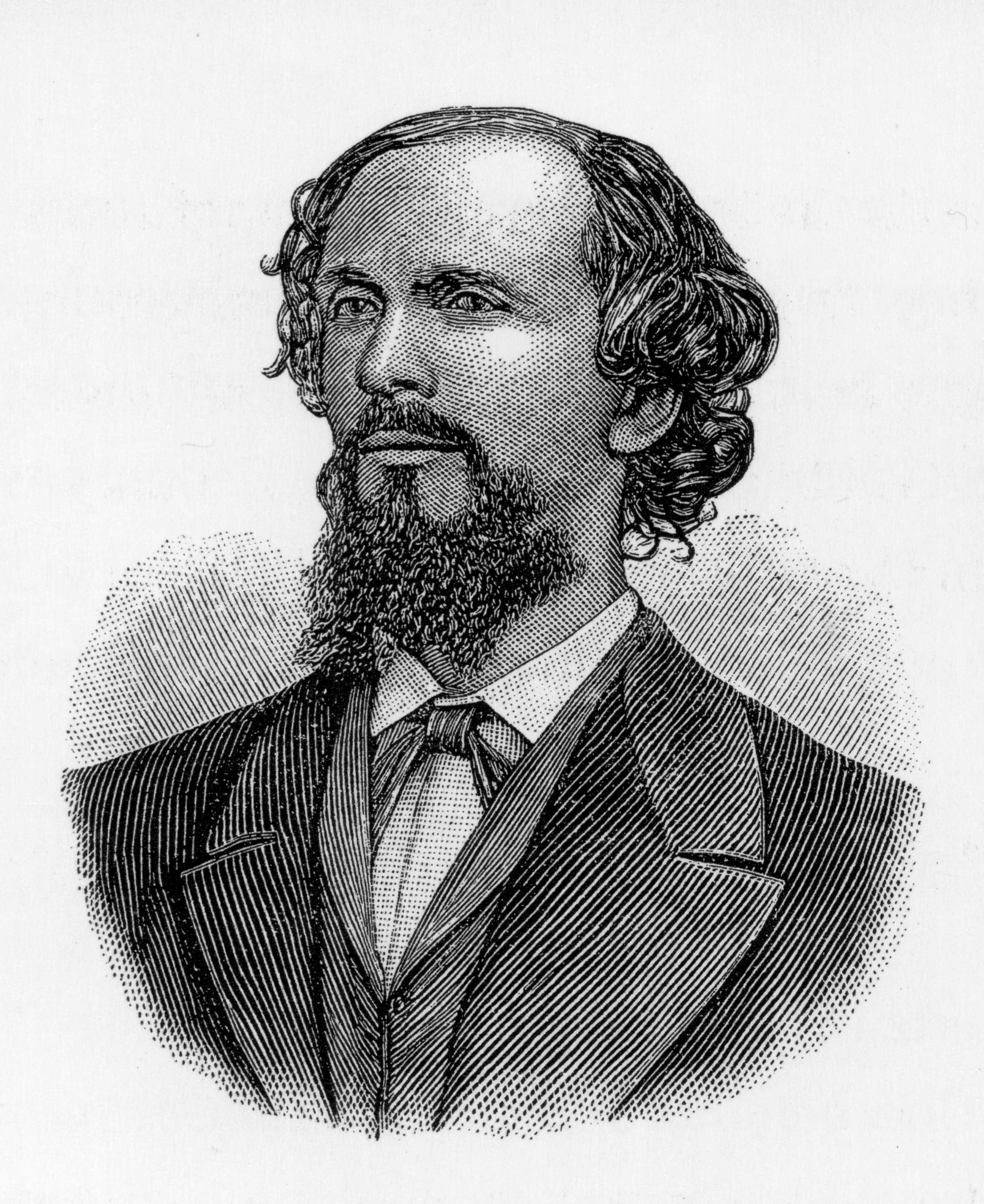
Karl Heinrich Ulrichs (1825–1895), a pioneer of LGBTQ rights

This is a list of important events relating to the LGBTQ community from 1801 to 1900. The earliest published studies of lesbian activity were written in the early 19th century.

== 1800s ==
=== 1803 ===
- The last recorded state sanctioned execution for male same-sex sodomy in continental Europe occurs in the Batavian Commonwealth.

=== 1807 ===
- One of the early known same-sex couples in American history, Vermont residents Charity Bryant and Sylvia Drake, begin their relationship. This couple is most strongly documented in historian Rachel Hope Cleves' 2014 book Charity and Sylvia: A Same-Sex Marriage in Early America.
- The Duchy of Warsaw is created, re-legalizing same-sex sexual intercourse.

== 1810s ==
=== 1810 ===
- In the Vere Street Coterie scandal, a group of men were arrested at a molly house in London; eight were tried, and two were executed by hanging

=== 1811 ===
- The Netherlands abolished laws criminalizing homosexual conduct.

=== 1813 ===
- The Kingdom of Bavaria abolishes laws criminalizing homosexual conduct between consenting adults.

=== 1814 ===
- The term "crime against nature" first used in the criminal code in the United States.

=== 1815 ===
- The Duchy of Warsaw is annexed between the Kingdom of Prussia and the Russian Empire, thus re-criminalizing same-sex sexual intercourse in Prussian annexed territory.

== 1820s ==
=== 1822 ===
- The Dominican Republic decriminalizes homosexuality.
- El Salvador decriminalizes homosexuality.

=== 1824 ===
- 28 October – The Marquis de Custine is beaten and left for dead after propositioning a male soldier in Saint-Denis. The scandal forces him out of the closet, but he recovers and lives the rest of his life as an open 'sodomite' with his partner Edward St. Barbe. Custine maintains a successful social life in Paris.

== 1830s ==
=== 1830 ===
- The Empire of Brazil decriminalizes homosexuality.

=== 1832 ===
- The Russian Empire criminalizes muzhelozhstvo, which courts interpret to mean anal sex between men, under Article 995 of the criminal code. Men convicted were stripped of their legal rights and sent to Siberia for four to five years.
- Bolivia decriminalizes homosexuality.

=== 1835 ===
- For the first time in history, homosexuality becomes illegal in Congress Poland, the Russian part of Poland acquired after the Partitions.
- The last known execution for homosexuality in Great Britain. James Pratt and John Smith are hanged at Newgate prison, London after being caught together in private lodgings

== 1840s ==
=== 1840 ===
- Hannover abolishes laws criminalizing homosexual conduct between consenting adults.

=== 1849 ===
- Leona Florentino was born in Spanish-colonized Philippines, beginning her literary career which would kickstart feminism against the Spanish-imposed patriarchy in the region and the writing of the archipelago's foundational lesbian literature.

== 1850s ==
=== 1852 ===
- Portugal decriminalizes homosexual acts.

=== 1853 ===
- Argentina decriminalizes homosexuality.

=== 1856 ===
- The first known reference to lesbians in Mormon history occurred in 1856, when a Salt Lake man noted in his diary that a Mormon woman was "trying to seduce a young girl".

=== 1858 ===
- The Ottoman Empire (predecessor of Turkey) decriminalizes homosexuality during its Tanzimat reform period.

== 1860s ==
=== 1861 ===
- In England, the Offences against the Person Act 1861 is amended to remove the death sentence for "buggery" (which had not been used since 1836). The penalty became imprisonment from 10 years to life.

=== 1865 ===
- San Marino decriminalizes homosexuality.

=== 1867 ===
- 29 August — Karl Heinrich Ulrichs became the first homosexual to speak out publicly in defence of homosexuality when he pleaded at the Congress of German Jurists in Munich for a resolution urging the repeal of anti-homosexual laws. He was shouted down. In an interview, Robert Beachy said "I think it is reasonable to describe [Ulrichs] as the first gay person to publicly out himself."

=== 1869 ===
- A German pamphlet by the Austrian-born novelist Karl-Maria Kertbeny (1824–1882), published anonymously, arguing against a Prussian anti-sodomy law contains the first known use of the word "homosexual" in print.
- Homosexuality is decriminalised in Suriname.

== 1870s ==
=== 1870 ===
- Joseph and His Friend: A Story of Pennsylvania is published, possibly the first American novel about a homosexual relationship.

=== 1871 ===
- Homosexuality is criminalized throughout the German Empire by Paragraph 175 of the Reich Criminal Code. It made homosexual acts between males a crime, and in early revisions the provision also criminalized bestiality. The Nazis broadened the law in 1935; in the prosecutions that followed, thousands died in Nazi concentration camps. It was repealed on 10 March 1994.
- Guatemala decriminalizes homosexuality.
- Mexico decriminalizes homosexuality.

== 1880s ==
=== 1880 ===
- The Empire of Japan decriminalized homosexual acts (anal sodomy), having only made them illegal during the early years of the Meiji Restoration
- Paraguay decriminalizes homosexuality.

=== 1885 ===
- In the United Kingdom, the Criminal Law Amendment Act 1885, whose Labouchere Amendment (Clause 11) outlaws oral sex between men—but not women—is given royal assent by Queen Victoria. A popular legend claims that Victoria struck references to lesbianism from the Act because of her refusal to believe that women "did such things"; in reality, they had simply never been mentioned in the Act. Clause 11 reads:

Any male person who, in public or private, commits, or is a party to the commission of, or procures or attempts to procure the commission by any male person of, any act of gross indecency with another male person, shall be guilty of a misdemeanor, and being convicted thereof shall be liable at the discretion of the court to be imprisoned for any term not exceeding two years, with or without hard labour.

Buggery, or anal sex between men, was already illegal.

=== 1886 ===
- We'wha, a lhamana of the Zuni tribe, begins a six-month stay in Washington, D.C., during which time they call upon President Grover Cleveland.
- In England, the Criminal Law Amendment Act 1885, outlawing sexual relations between men (but not between women) is given royal assent by Queen Victoria.
- Portugal re-criminalizes homosexual acts.

=== 1889 ===
- The Cleveland Street Scandal erupts in England.

== 1890s ==
=== 1890 ===
- Homosexuality is legalized in Italy through the creation of the Codice Zanardelli.
- Homosexuality is legalized in the Vatican, which at the time was under the jurisdiction of Italy.

=== 1892 ===
- The words "bisexual" and "heterosexual" are first used in English in their current senses in Charles Gilbert Chaddock's translation of Kraft-Ebing's Psychopathia Sexualis.

=== 1892 ===
- Popular, openly bisexual poet Edna St. Vincent Millay is born on 22 February.

=== 1894 ===
- Biologist and pioneer of human sexuality Alfred Kinsey is born on 23 June.

=== 1895 ===
- The trial of Oscar Wilde results in his being prosecuted under the Criminal Law Amendment Act 1885 for "gross indecency" and sentenced to two years hard labor in prison.
- In Brazil, Adolfo Caminha publishes his controversial novel Bom-Crioulo (in English:The Black Man and the Cabin Boy) with homosexuality at its center and with a Black man as the story's hero.

=== 1897 ===
- December — Magnus Hirschfeld petitions the Reichstag to abolish Paragraph 175, the first salvo in a lifelong campaign for repeal.
- George Cecil Ives organizes the first homosexual rights group in England, the Order of Chaeronea.

=== 1899 ===
- Honduras decriminalizes homosexuality.

== See also ==
- Timeline of LGBT history – timeline of events from 12,000 BCE to present
- LGBT rights by country or territory – current legal status around the world
- LGBT social movements
- Timeline of LGBT history, 20th century
- Timeline of LGBT history, 21st century
- Timeline of transgender history
