= Ariel Nicholson =

American model and activist

- Born: 23 January 2001 (age 25); New Jersey, U.S.
- Modeling information
- Height: 1.85 m (6 ft 1 in)

Ariel Nicholson Murtagh (born January 23, 2001) is a New York-based model, writer, actress, and LGBT rights activist. She was the first openly transgender model to walk in a Calvin Klein presentation and the first openly transgender woman on the cover of American Vogue. Her writing has appeared in Perfect Magazine, amongst other publications.

== Early life ==
Nicholson was born and raised in New Jersey.

At an early age, she told her parents that she did not "belong as a boy" and, in fifth grade, began using female pronouns and taking Lupron to suppress the effects of male puberty. She was also seeing a therapist from the Ackerman Institute for the Family at the time. When she was in eighth grade she was featured in the PBS documentary Growing Up Trans, where she talked about her decision to go on estradiol.

== Work ==
While she was a high school student, Nicholson signed with DNA Model Management. She was chosen by Raf Simons to walk for Calvin Klein's 2018 Spring/Summer fashion show, making her modelling debut. She was the first transgender woman to walk in a Calvin Klein fashion show. Nicholson has since appeared in Calvin Klein advertisement campaigns, editorials in Vogue and W, and has walked in runway shows for Marc Jacobs and Miu Miu. She was photographed by Mert & Marcus for the cover of Love's anniversary issue.

She was featured on the September 2020 cover of Italian Vogue.

In October 2020, Nicholson was featured in V Magazine's The Thoughts Leaders issue.

In 2021, Nicholson became the first openly transgender person to be featured on the cover of AmericanVogue.

== Activism ==
She volunteers with Gender & Family Project, an organization that supports transgender youth and their families.
