= List of LGBTQ firsts by year (2010s) =

This list of lesbian, gay, bisexual, and transgender (LGBT) firsts by year denotes pioneering LGBTQ endeavors of the 2010s organized chronologically.

== List ==
=== 2010 ===
- Sharon Lubinski became the first openly gay United States Marshal.
- Guinness World Records recognized transgender man Thomas Beatie as the world's "First Married Man to Give Birth."
- Amanda Simpson became the first openly transgender presidential appointee in America.
- Kye Allums became the first openly transgender athlete to play in NCAA basketball. He came out as a transgender man while playing on George Washington University's women's team.
- Phyllis Frye became the first openly transgender judge appointed in the United States.
- Bill Hastings (judge) became the first openly gay judge appointed in New Zealand on July 9, 2010.
- Mary Glasspool became the first openly lesbian bishop ordained by the Episcopal Church of the United States.
- Mary Albing became the first openly lesbian minister ordained by the Evangelical Lutheran Church in America.
- Same-sex marriage was legalized in the District of Columbia, and Sinjoyla Townsend and Angelisa Young became the first same-sex couple to marry in the District of Columbia.
- In May 2010, Anna Maranta became the first lesbian rabbi to be privately ordained in Ottawa, Ontario, Canada.
- Same-sex marriage was legalized in Argentina, the first Latin American country to do so.
- Hollyoaks, produced and filmed at the Liverpool-based Lime Pictures studios, became the first ever British soap opera to introduce a storyline featuring a transgender character played by a transgender actor.
- The Liberal Democrats became Britain's first major political party to formally endorse same-sex marriage at their Liverpool party conference.
- Chai Feldblum became the first openly gay person to serve on the EEOC.
- Tyler McCormick became the first openly transgender man, the first wheelchair user, and the first person from New Mexico to win International Mr. Leather.

=== 2011 ===
- Steven Davies became the first openly gay international cricketer.
- Gregory Gandrud was elected as the first openly gay member of the California Republican Party Board of Directors.
- Tony Briffa was the first openly intersex person to be elected to public office as mayor.
- The Suquamish tribe of Washington legalized same-sex marriage on August 1, 2011, following a unanimous vote by the Suquamish Tribal Council.
- Dominic Hannigan and John Lyons became the first openly gay members of Dáil Éireann.
- In the 2011 Polish parliamentary election, Anna Grodzka was elected as the first transgender member of the Polish Sejm, and the first in European history.
- Robert Biedroń was elected as Poland's first openly gay male member of the Sejm.
- Ruth Davidson became the first openly gay leader of both a major British and Scottish political party.
- Elio Di Rupo became the first openly gay Prime Minister of Belgium, second openly homosexual head of government in Europe.
- Chaz Bono appeared on the 13th season of the US version of Dancing with the Stars in 2011. This was the first time an openly transgender man starred on a major network television show for reasons unrelated to gender.
- Harmony Santana became the first openly transgender actress to receive a major acting award nomination.
- Courtney Mitchell and Sarah Welton, both from Colorado, were married in Nepal's first public lesbian wedding ceremony, although the marriage was not legally recognized in Nepal.
- Same-sex marriage was legalized in New York state, and Kitty Lambert and Cheryle Rudd became the first same-sex couple to be married in New York state.
- Liverpool born Anton Hysén came out as Sweden's first openly gay male footballer and the second ever openly gay high-level footballer in the world.
- Liverpool, England recognised the Liverpool gay quarter with rainbow street signs.
- Rachel Isaacs was the first openly lesbian rabbi ordained by the Conservative movement's Jewish Theological Seminary.
- Brenda Sue Fulton was named to the West Point Board of Visitors, making her the first openly gay member of the board that advises the Academy.
- Petty Officer 2nd Class Marissa Gaeta of California and Petty Officer 3rd Class Citlalic Snell of Los Angeles became the first same-sex couple chosen to share the first kiss upon a U.S. Navy ship's return.
- Brooke (last name withheld) was hired as the New York City Fire Department's first openly transgender employee.
- Greg Meyer became the first openly queer person to win one of America's National Debate Championships, the American Parliamentary Debate Association's National Championship.
- Miss New York, Claire Buffie, became the first Miss America contestant to campaign for the Miss America title on a gay rights platform.
- Xavier Bettel became the first openly gay Mayor of Luxembourg City.
- Jaiyah "Johnny" Saelua became the first openly transgender international footballer to play in the World Cup.
- A resolution submitted by South Africa requesting a study on discrimination and sexual orientation (A/HRC/17/L.9/Rev.1) passed, 23 to 19 with 3 abstentions, in the United Nations Human Rights Council on June 17, 2011. This was the first time that any United Nations body approved a resolution affirming the rights of LGBT people.
- Fred Karger beggan running for the 2012 Republican nomination for President, which made him America's first openly gay major-party presidential candidate in history
- San Francisco's Human Rights Commission released a report on bisexual visibility, titled "Bisexual Invisibility: Impacts and Regulations"; this was the first time any governmental body released such a report.

=== 2012 ===
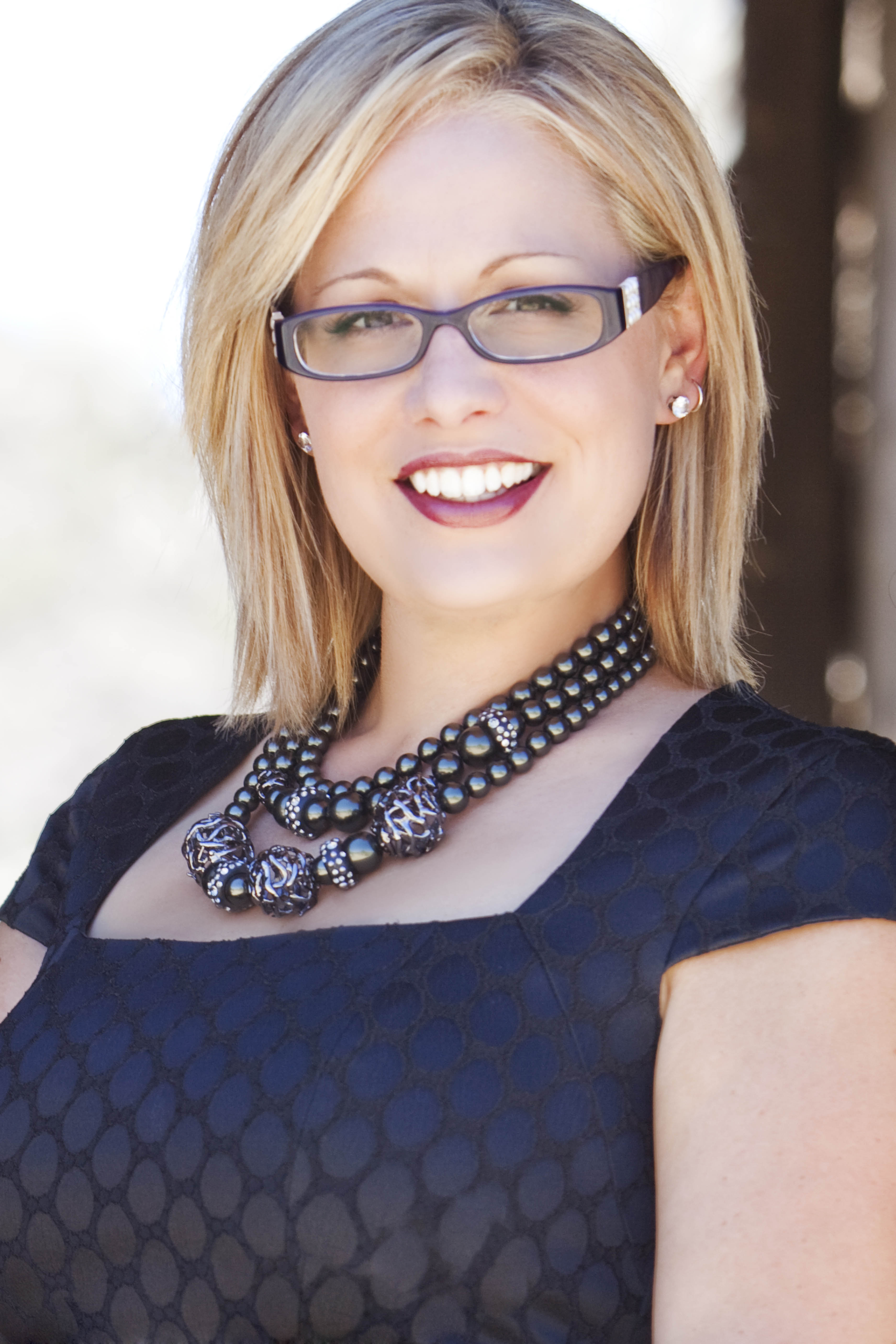
In 2012 Kyrsten Sinema became the first openly bisexual person elected to the U.S. Congress.

- Richard Grenell was a foreign policy spokesperson for Republican Mitt Romney during Romney's 2012 campaign for president of the United States; this made him the first openly gay individual to work as a spokesperson for a Republican presidential candidate.
- Katie Ricks became the first open lesbian ordained by the Presbyterian Church (U.S.A.).
- Air Force Col. Ginger Wallace became the first known out member of the U.S. military to have their same-sex partner participate in the pinning ceremony tradition that had been reserved for spouses and family members. Her partner of 10 years, Kathy Knopf, pinned colonel wings on Wallace days after the two attended President Obama's State of The Union address as a guest of the First Lady.
- Navy Chief Elny McKinney and Anacelly McKinney became the first known same-sex couple to marry on a U.S. military base. They were wed at Naval Base Point Loma in San Diego.
- President Barack Obama became the first sitting U.S. president officially in favor of same-sex marriage.
- Barney Frank became the first sitting member of Congress to be married to a same-sex spouse.
- Sally Ride's obituary revealed that she had been in a 27-year relationship with Tam O'Shaughnessy, making her the first known member of the LGBT community to have served as an astronaut.
- Liverpool was the first city in the world to officially mark the International Day Against Homophobia and Transphobia with a number of free events.
- Ullet Road Unitarian Church, Liverpool, hosted the first UK civil partnership on religious premises.
- Liverpool Football Club became the first Premier League club to take a stand against homophobia and be officially represented at a UK 'Pride' event at Liverpool Pride.
- In 2012, at a ceremony in Arlington, Army Reserve officer Tammy Smith became the first openly gay active duty general in American history.
- Kylar Broadus, founder of the Trans People of Color Coalition of Columbia, Missouri, spoke to the U.S. Senate in favor of the Employment Non-Discrimination Act. His speech was the first-ever U.S. Senate testimony from an openly transgender witness.
- The D.C. Office of Human Rights created America's first government-funded campaign to combat anti-transgender discrimination.
- Taiwan's first same-sex Buddhist wedding was held for Fish Huang and her partner You Ya-ting, with Buddhist master Shih Chao-hui presiding over the ritual.
- The first lesbian Super PAC, LPAC, was created to represent the interests of lesbians in the United States, and to campaign on LGBT and women's rights issues.
- Tammy Baldwin was elected as the first openly gay U.S. Senator.
- Kyrsten Sinema was elected to the House of Representatives, becoming the first openly bisexual member of Congress. She represented Arizona's 9th Congressional district.
- Stacie Laughton became the first openly transgender person elected as a state legislator in United States history. She was elected to the New Hampshire state legislature. In 1992 Althea Garrison had been elected as a state legislator, serving one term in the Massachusetts House of Representatives, but it was not publicly known she was transgender when she was elected.
- San Francisco voted to become the first U.S. city to provide and cover the cost of gender-identity-related surgeries for uninsured transgender residents.
- Mark Pocan was elected in Wisconsin's 2nd Congressional District, becoming the first openly gay candidate to follow an openly gay member of the U.S. Congress (Tammy Baldwin).
- Sean Patrick Maloney became the first openly gay candidate elected to represent New York in Congress.
- Mark Takano became the first openly gay person of color to win election to the U.S. House. He was elected to represent California's 41st Congressional District.
- Josh Boschee was elected as North Dakota's first openly gay legislator.
- Stephen Skinner was elected as West Virginia's first openly gay state legislator.
- Jacob Candelaria was elected as New Mexico's first openly gay male state legislator.
- Brian Sims became Pennsylvania's first openly gay state legislator who was out when he was elected.
- After Brian Sims was elected but before he took office, Rep. Mike Fleck came out as gay, making him Pennsylvania's first openly gay state legislator.
- David Richardson was elected as Florida's first openly gay state legislator.
- Colorado Democrats elected Mark Ferrandino as the first openly gay House speaker in state history.
- Maine, Maryland, and Washington became the first states to pass same-sex marriage by popular vote. Maine was the very first state to do so, followed by Maryland.
- The first same-sex marriage at the U.S. Military Academy was held for lieutenant Ellen Schick and her partner Shannon Simpson at the Old Cadet Chapel in West Point's cemetery.
- Kate McKinnon became the first openly lesbian cast member of Saturday Night Live; previous SNL cast member Danitra Vance never disclosed her sexual orientation publicly, but was revealed to be a lesbian when she died.
- The first same-sex marriage at the U.S. Military Academy's Cadet Chapel at West Point (not to be confused with the Old Cadet Chapel) was held for Brenda Sue Fulton and Penelope Dara Gnesin. Fulton was a veteran and the communications director of an organization called Outserve, which represents actively serving gay, lesbian, bisexual and transgender military personnel.
- The first same-sex couple became engaged in the White House (Ben Schock and Matthew Phelps).
- The Right Reverend Doctor Gary Paterson, Elected Moderator of the United Church of Canada, became the first openly gay leader of a major Christian denomination.
- City Councilmember Marlene Pray joined the Doylestown, Pennsylvania council in 2012 and was the first openly bisexual office holder in Pennsylvania.
- California became the first state to sign a ban on conversion therapy.
- Orlando Cruz became the world's first professional boxer to come out as gay.
- On September 18, 2012, Berkeley, California became potentially the first city in the U.S. to officially proclaim a day recognizing bisexuals. The Berkeley City Council unanimously and without discussion declared September 23 as Bisexual Pride and Bi Visibility Day.
- Emily Aviva Kapor, a privately ordained American rabbi, came out as transgender, thus becoming the first openly transgender female rabbi.
- Rainbow Jews, an oral history project showcasing the lives of Jewish bisexual, lesbian, gay, and transgender people in the United Kingdom from the 1950s until the present, was launched. It became the United Kingdom's first archive of Jewish LGBT history.
- In November 2012, the Southern Poverty Law Center filed a lawsuit against JONAH (a Jewish ex-gay organization), Goldberg, and Downing on behalf of Unger, Levin, two other participants, and two of the participants' mothers for fraudulent practices which are illegal under New Jersey's consumer protection laws. The Southern Poverty Law Center noted that the lawsuit was "groundbreaking" as it was the first time a conversion therapy provider has been sued for fraudulent business practices.
- ParaNorman, released in 2012, had the first openly gay character in a mainstream animated film.
- In 2012, the Bisexuality Report, the first report of its kind in the United Kingdom, was issued.
- Luma Nogueira de Andrade received a doctorate degree from the Faculty of Education at the Federal University of Ceará, becoming the first transgender individual to receive a doctorate degree in Brazil.
- Adam Lambert's Trespassing was the first album from an openly gay male artist to reach number one on the Billboard 200 charts.
- Pedro Peters Maldonado became the first openly gay politician elected to public office in Puerto Rico as a member of the Municipal Legislature of San Juan, Puerto Rico.

=== 2013 ===
- Xavier Bettel became the first openly gay Prime Minister of Luxembourg and the third openly homosexual head of government in Europe.
- Julia Curlee became the first CIA officer to undergo a gender transition and remain employed by the agency.
- Etienne Schneider assumed office as the first openly gay Deputy Prime Minister of Luxembourg.
- Luxembourg became the first country in the world to have an openly gay Prime Minister Xavier Bettel and an openly gay Deputy Prime Minister Etienne Schneider.
- Barack Obama used the word "gay" and spoke about gay rights for the first time in a speech at the U.S. presidential swearing-in.
- Same-sex marriage was legalized in Minnesota and Rhode Island, as well as by the Confederated Tribes of the Colville Reservation in the state of Washington, the Little Traverse Bay Bands of Odawa Indians, the Pokagon Band of Potawatomi Indians, and the Santa Ysabel Tribe.
- Kathleen Wynne became the first openly LGBT premier of a Canadian province.
- Robbie Rogers came out as gay, becoming the only male fully-capped international association footballer to do so. He later joined the Los Angeles Galaxy, making him the first openly gay male athlete to compete in Major League Soccer.
- Chris Anderson of Chattanooga, Tennessee, became the first openly gay elected official to win a contested election in Tennessee.
- Jason Collins became the first active male professional athlete in a major North American team sport to publicly come out as gay.
- Rep. Mark Pocan's spouse Philip Frank became the first same-sex spouse of a federal lawmaker to officially receive a House spouse ID. In 2009, Marlon Reis, the spouse of Rep. Jared Polis (D-Colo.), was issued a congressional spouse ID, but later card services told him that he had been given the designation accidentally.
- Autumn Sandeen, a U.S. veteran and transgender woman, received a letter from a Navy official stating, "Per your request the Defense Enrollment Eligibility Reporting System (DEERS) has been updated to show your gender as female effective April 12th, 2013." Allyson Robinson of Outserve declared, "To our knowledge, this is the first time that the Department of Defense has recognized and affirmed a change of gender for anyone affiliated, in a uniformed capacity—in this case a military retiree."
- For the first time, the U.S. Department of Veterans Affairs decided to allow the same-sex spouse of a military veteran to be buried in a U.S. national cemetery. VA Secretary Eric Shinseki gave permission for retired Air Force officer Linda Campbell, 66, to bury the ashes of her same-sex spouse Nancy Lynchild at Willamette National Cemetery in Oregon.
- The first same-sex kiss ever on a Eurovision stage occurred at the 2013 Eurovision Song Contest when Krista Siegfrids, who sang "Marry Me", ended her semi-final performance by kissing one of her female dancers.
- ABC News National Assignment Editor Dawn Ennis came out as the first transgender woman in U.S. TV network news.
- Dr. Saul Levin was named as the new chief executive officer and medical director of the American Psychiatric Association, making him the first known openly gay person to head the APA.
- Ukraine had its first gay pride march, which was held in Kyiv.
- Rehana Kausar and Sobia Kamar, both from Pakistan, became the first Muslim lesbian couple to get married in a civil ceremony in the United Kingdom.
- Fallon Fox came out as transgender, thus becoming the first openly transgender athlete in MMA history.
- Jallen Messersmith of Benedictine College came out and was believed to be the first openly gay player in U.S. men's college basketball.
- Guy Erwin became the first openly gay bishop to be elected to the Evangelical Lutheran Church in America (ELCA); he was elected to the Southwest California Synod of the ELCA.
- France legalized same-sex marriage and adoption, and Vincent Autin and Bruno Boileau became the first couple to have a legal same-sex marriage under the new law.
- Major General Patricia Rose became the first openly lesbian two-star general in the U.S. Air Force, and the highest ranking openly gay officer in the entire U.S. military at the time.
- The Bi Writers Association, which promotes bisexual writers, books, and writing, announced the winners of its first Bisexual Book Awards. An awards ceremony was held at the Nuyorican Poets Café.
- Kristin Beck came out as the first openly transgender retired Navy SEAL.
- The U.S. Senate confirmed Nitza Quiñones Alejandro to a federal judgeship, making her the first openly gay Latina to hold such a post.
- Cason Crane became the first openly gay man to summit Mount Everest.
- U.S. Air Force Under Secretary Eric Fanning took over as acting secretary of the U.S. Air Force, becoming the highest ranking openly LGBT official at the Department of Defense.
- The Directors Guild of America elected Paris Barclay as its first black and first openly gay president.
- Julian Marsh and Traian Popov become the first married gay couple to have a green card application approved.
- A married lesbian couple in Colorado became the first to receive a marriage-based green card, making Cathy Davis the first same-sex spouse to become a lawful permanent resident of the United States.
- Kristin Perry and Sandra Stier became the first same-sex couple to be married in California since Proposition 8 was overturned.
- Daniel Kawczynski, MP for Shrewsbury and Parliamentary Private Secretary to Welsh Secretary David Jones, became the first MP in Britain to come out as bisexual.
- Maureen Le Marinel became the first openly lesbian union president elected in Britain. She was elected to the presidency of Unison, one of Britain's largest trade unions.
- "Same Love", a hit single from Macklemore & Ryan Lewis, became the first Top 40 song in the U.S. to promote and celebrate same-sex marriage.
- For the first time, the California Department of Education's list of recommended books for grades Pre-K-through-12 included a book with a transgender theme, I Am J by Cris Beam.
- The first UFC match between two openly gay fighters, Liz Carmouche and Jéssica Andrade, was held.
- Benjamin Medrano was elected as the first openly gay mayor in Mexico's history, being elected mayor of the township of Fresnillo.
- Although same-sex marriage was illegal in Pennsylvania, Loreen Bloodgood married Alicia Terrizzi, making them the first same-sex couple to marry in Pennsylvania; the Montgomery County register of wills, D. Bruce Hanes, had said that his office would issue marriage licenses to same-sex couples.
- California enacted America's first law protecting transgender students; the law, called the School Success and Opportunity Act, declares that every public school student in California from kindergarten to 12th grade must be "permitted to participate in sex-segregated school programs and activities, including athletic teams and competitions, and use facilities consistent with his or her gender identity, irrespective of the gender listed on the pupil's records."
- Darren Young became the first active professional wrestler to come out as gay.
- Master Sgt. Angela Shunk and her wife, Tech. Sgt. Stacey Shunk, became the first same-sex couple to receive an assignment together under the U.S. Air Force's Join Spouse program.
- Jennifer Pritzker came out as transgender and thus became the world's first openly transgender billionaire.
- On Celebrate Bisexuality Day, the White House held a closed-door meeting with almost 30 bisexual advocates so they could meet with government officials and discuss issues of specific importance to the bisexual community; this was the first bi-specific event ever hosted by any White House.
- Ruth Bader Ginsburg became the first member of the U.S. Supreme Court to officiate a same-sex wedding.
- Movie director Kim-Jho Gwangsoo and his partner Kim Seung-hwan became the first South Korean gay couple to publicly wed, although it was not a legally recognized marriage.
- Harvey Milk was chosen as the first openly LGBTQ political official to be featured on an American postage stamp.
- Carol McCrory and Brenda Clark became the first same-sex couple to have their marriage application accepted by Buncombe County Register of Deeds Drew Reisinger, which makes them the first same-sex couple to have their marriage application accepted in the South.
- Andy Herren became the first openly gay winner of the reality show Big Brother.
- The first gay pride parade in Montenegro was held.
- The first gay pride week in Curaçao was held.
- The first Indo-American lesbian wedding was held. It was held in Los Angeles.
- The first televised Romanian same-sex wedding was held. It was between two men, and was done on the reality show Four Weddings and a Challenge.
- The Portland Trail Blazers became the first NBA team to support same-sex marriage.
- Todd M. Hughes became the first openly gay U.S. circuit judge.
- The first United Nations ministerial meeting on the rights of lesbian, gay, bisexual and transgender individuals was held. Representatives from the US, France, Argentina, Brazil, Croatia, the Netherlands, Norway, Japan, New Zealand and the EU, along with executive directors of Human Rights Watch and the International Gay and Lesbian Human Rights Commission, reaffirmed their commitments to working together to end discrimination and violence towards the LGBT community. UN High Commissioner for Human Rights Navi Pillay delivered remarks in a press release commending the LGBT community and praising the fact that "many countries have embarked on historic reforms—strengthening anti-discrimination laws, combating hate crime against LGBT people and sensitizing public opinion."
- New Jersey held its first legal same-sex marriages.
- Rabbi Deborah Waxman was elected as the President of the Reconstructionist Rabbinical College. She was believed to be the first woman and first lesbian to lead a Jewish congregational union, and the first female rabbi and first lesbian to lead a Jewish seminary.
- A six-year-old girl named Luana became the first transgender child in Argentina to have her new name officially changed on her identity documents. She was believed to be the youngest to benefit from the country's Gender Identity Law, which was approved in May 2012.
- Q Radio, which went on the airwaves in September, claims to be India's first radio station to cater to the country's LGBT community.
- Jennifer Finney Boylan was chosen as the first openly transgender co-chair of GLAAD's National Board of Directors.
- On 31 October 2013, Paris Lees became the first openly transgender panellist to appear on the BBC's Question Time programme, drawing praise from commentators who included former Deputy Prime Minister John Prescott and the Labour Party deputy leader Harriet Harman.
- Stephen Alexander became the first high school coach to come out publicly as transgender.
- Nikki Sinclaire came out as transgender, thus becoming the UK's first openly transgender Parliamentarian.
- San Francisco's first Project Homeless Connect for LGBT people was held.
- Kevin Rudd became the first Prime Minister of Australia to openly support same-sex marriage.
- Lucy Vallender converted to Islam, thus becoming the United Kingdom's first openly transgender Muslim woman.
- Mark C. Goldman became the first openly gay president of the American Conference of Cantors, a Reform Jewish organization.
- Ben Barres became the first openly transgender scientist in the US National Academy of Sciences.
- Audrey Gauthier was elected president of CUPE 4041, representing Air Transat flight attendants based in Montreal. She thus became the first openly transgender person elected president of a union in Canada.
- BiLaw, the first American national organization of bisexual lawyers, law professors, law students, and their allies, was founded.
- Luma Nogueira de Andrade, the first transgender individual to receive a doctorate degree in Brazil, was inducted as a professor at the University for International Integration of the Afro-Brazilian Lusophony, becoming the first transgender university professor in Brazil.
- Brighton hosted its first pride parade, Trans Pride Brighton, the first trans pride event in the UK.

=== 2014 ===
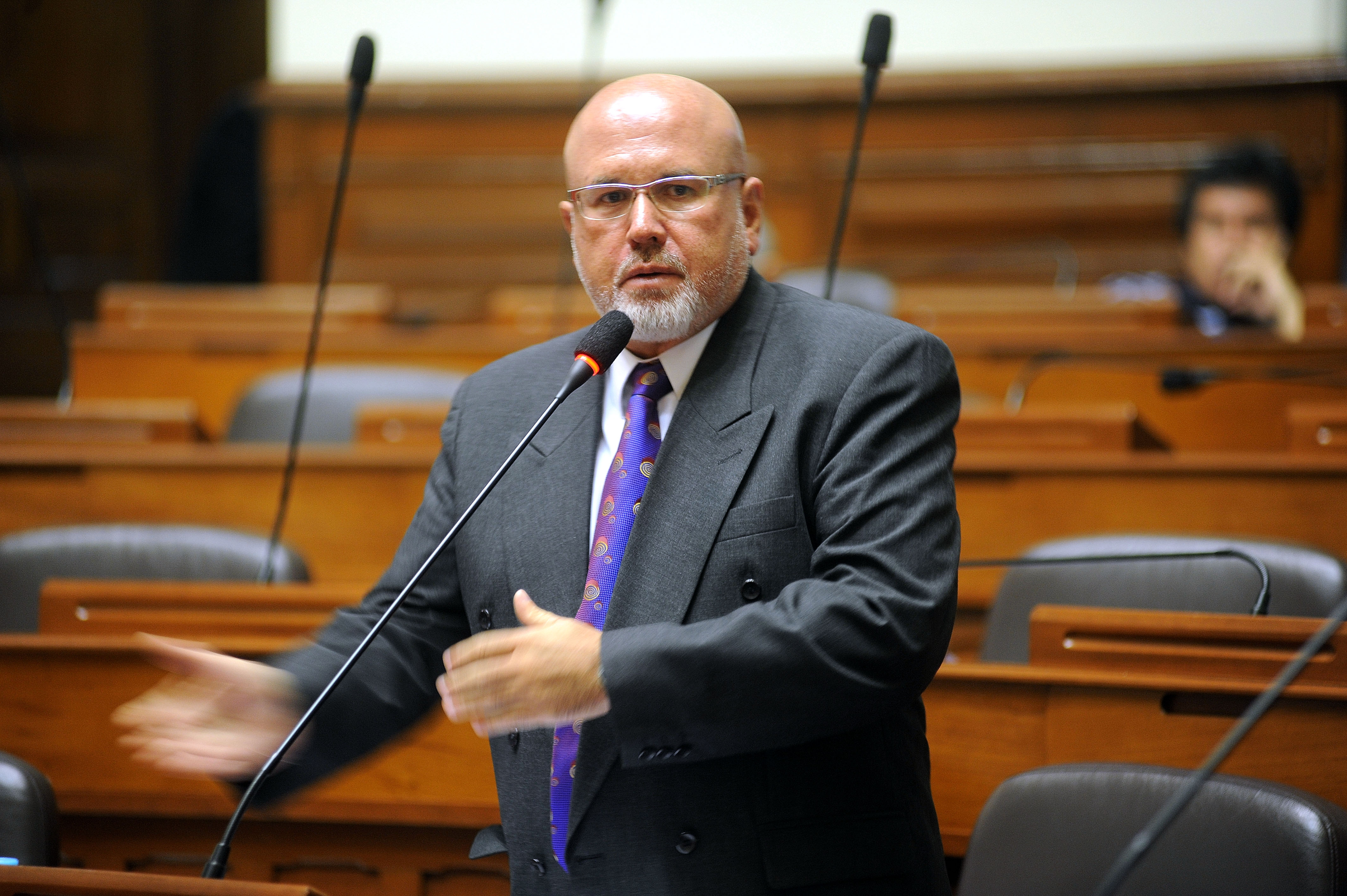
In 2014 Carlos Bruce became the first openly gay member of Congress in Peru.

- Days of Our Lives characters Will Horton and Sonny Kiriakis become the first gay male couple to get married on U.S. daytime television.
- The first same-sex marriage at the Rose Parade was held, for Aubrey Loots and Danny LeClair.
- The marriage of Giuseppe Chigiotti and Stefano Bucci became the first overseas same-sex marriage to be legally recognized in Italy; the two were married in New York in 2012.
- Neil Patrick Harris became the first openly gay man to be named as The Hasty Pudding Theatricals Man of the Year.
- Berlin, Germany unveiled the world's first cemetery for lesbians.
- Umma Azul was the first child of a lesbian couple to be baptized by the Catholic Church in Argentina.
- Conner Mertens, Willamette University's kicker, became the first active college football player to come out as LGBT; he came out as bisexual.
- Meghan Stabler became the first openly transgender woman to be named Working Mother of the Year by Working Mother Magazine.
- Good Luck Charlie on The Disney Channel became the first TV show on a child-targeting network to feature a same-sex couple (the characters' names were Susan and Cheryl).
- Starkville became the first city in Mississippi to pass a resolution supporting the LGBT community; the resolution states that the city does not condone discrimination of any kind, including any against its citizens for their sexual orientation or gender identity.
- The FTM Fitness Conference hosted the first bodybuilding competition for transgender men, the FTM Fitness World Bodybuilding Competition.
- The Bisexual Resource Center, based in Boston, Massachusetts, declared March 2014 as the first Bisexual Health Awareness Month, with the theme "Bi the Way, Our Health Matters Too!"; it included the first social media campaign to address disparities in physical and mental health facing the bisexual community.
- Queen Elizabeth II praised the London Lesbian and Gay Switchboard for their 40-year history making it the first time the Crown has ever publicly supported the LGBT community. They received a comment from the Queen saying: "Best wishes and congratulations to all concerned on this most special anniversary."
- Toni Atkins was elected as the first openly lesbian speaker of the California Assembly.
- Judith Levy was confirmed by the Senate as the first openly lesbian federal judge in Michigan.
- Gypsy Vered Meltzer was elected to the City Council in Appleton; as such he became the first openly transgender elected official in Wisconsin.
- Anna Guillot and Chrissy Kelly, who were married in New York in 2012, became the first same-sex couple in Mississippi to create a public record of their marriage, which they did by paying to record their marriage license from New York at the Rankin County Chancery Clerk's Office in Brandon, Mississippi. However, this did not give their marriage legal standing in Mississippi.
- Emilia Maria Jesty, daughter of a lesbian couple, was the first child born in Tennessee to have a woman listed on the birth certificate as her "father".
- UMass basketball player Derrick Gordon came out, thus becoming the first openly gay player in Division I college men's basketball.
- The Revd Canon Jeremy Pemberton married Laurence Cunnington on 12 April, and thus Pemberton became the first priest in the Church of England to defy the Church's ban on gay clergy marrying.
- Michael Sam was drafted by the St. Louis Rams and thus became the first openly gay player to be drafted into the National Football League.
- The world's first homoerotic stamps were produced in Finland, celebrating one of the country's most famous artists—Tom of Finland. Art critic Estelle Lovatt says "the stamps are a 'great statement' given that the country bans gay marriage".
- In March 2014, same-sex marriage was legalized in Michigan, and Glenna DeJong and Marsha Caspar became the first same-sex couple married in Michigan; however, later that year the overturning of Michigan's ban on same-sex marriage was indefinitely stayed.
- In May 2014, same-sex marriage was legalized in Arkansas, and Kristin Seaton and Jennifer Rambo became the first same-sex couple married in Arkansas: later that year, same-sex marriage in Arkansas was suspended by the Arkansas Supreme Court.
- In May 2014, same-sex marriage was legalized in Oregon, and Deanna Geiger and Janine Nelson became the first same-sex couple to marry in Oregon.
- The U.S. Naval Academy Chapel's first-ever same-sex wedding was held for David Bucher, a 49-year-old Academy graduate who works at the Pentagon, and partner Bruce Moats.
- Costa Rica flew the gay pride flag at their presidential palace; the International Gay and Lesbian Human Rights Commission said the organization believed it was the first time the gay pride flag had been flown from the offices of a head of state in the Americas.
- The U.S. Department of Veterans Affairs agreed to give survivor benefits to the first-known same-sex war widow, Tracy Dice Johnson, whose wife Donna Johnson died in a suicide bombing attack in 2012.
- Laverne Cox was on the cover of the June 9, 2014 issue of Time, and was interviewed for the article "The Transgender Tipping Point" by Katy Steinmetz, which ran in that issue and the title of which was also featured on the cover; this makes Cox the first openly transgender person on the cover of Time.
- Both lesbian parents were listed on their children's birth certificates in Australia, which was the first time an Australian birth certificate indicates that both members of a same-sex couple were the legal parents of a child at birth.
- Best Bi Short Stories, the first book of its type, was published; it was edited by Sheela Lambert, who contributed the story "Memory Lane".
- Cyprus' first ever gay pride parade draws several thousands of participants.
- Same-sex marriage was legalized in Pennsylvania.
- Carlos Bruce came out and thus became the first openly gay member of Congress in Peru.
- Same-sex marriage was legalized in Wisconsin, but later that year same-sex marriages in Wisconsin were put on hold while the ruling striking down the state's ban on such unions was appealed.
- Idaho's same-sex marriage ban was declared unconstitutional, but another court stayed the ruling.
- The United Church of Christ filed a lawsuit challenging North Carolina's ban on same-sex marriage, which was America's first faith-based challenge to same-sex marriage bans; the Central Conference of American Rabbis and the Alliance of Baptists joined the lawsuit later that year.
- Lynne Brown was appointed as the first openly gay cabinet minister in South Africa, which also makes her the first openly gay person to be appointed to a cabinet post in any African government.
- Zakhele Mbhele became the first openly gay person to serve in South Africa's parliament, which also makes him the first openly gay black member of parliament in any African nation.
- Maite Oronoz Rodríguez became the first openly gay person to be nominated for a seat on Puerto Rico's Supreme Court and was confirmed for the seat later that year.
- Darrin P. Gayles became the first openly gay African-American man to be confirmed as a U.S federal judge.
- The book Bisexuality: Making the Invisible Visible in Faith Communities, the first book of its kind, was published. It was authored by Marie Alford-Harkey and Debra W. Haffner.
- Transgender Studies Quarterly, the first non-medical academic journal devoted to transgender issues, began publication in 2014, with Susan Stryker and Paisley Currah as coeditors.
- Petra De Sutter became the first openly transgender person to serve in Belgium's Parliament, specifically its Senate.
- Britain's first Jewish lesbian marriage was held for Nicola Pettit, who is Jewish, and her girlfriend Tania Ward, in a ceremony which contained Jewish elements. They married in Brighton Town Hall, in southern England, and then had their union blessed by a rabbi. It was the first same-sex wedding involving a Jew since the same-sex marriage Act came into force.
- Toni Atkins served as acting governor of California for a day after Governor Jerry Brown left for a trade mission to Mexico, Lieutenant Governor Gavin Newsom flew to the east coast for a Special Olympics appearance, and Senate President Pro Tempore Darrell Steinberg was in Chicago for personal business. She thus became California's first openly gay governor on that day.
- Laverne Cox became the first openly transgender person to be nominated for an Emmy in an acting category: Outstanding Guest Actress in a Comedy Series for her role as Sophia Burset in Orange Is the New Black.
- Yein Kai Yee and Sutpreedee Chinithigun, both British citizens, were married at the British Embassy in Vietnam, thus becoming the first same-sex British couple to marry in Vietnam.
- The Transgender Trends panel was the first panel on that subject ever held at San Diego Comic-Con.
- Gordon Stevenson and Peter Fraser, a dual Australian/British citizen, were the first to be married in Australia under British same-sex marriage laws; they were married at the British consulate in Sydney, Australia.
- The first Jewish boat participated in the Amsterdam Pride Canal Parade. Dana International was on the boat, as well as the Fokkens twins (Louise Fokkens and Martine Fokkens), who are famous in the Netherlands for having worked 50 years as sex workers in Amsterdam's Red Light District before their retirement earlier in 2014. Marianne van Praag, a Reform rabbi from The Hague, was the only rabbi aboard.
- The first Moroccan boat participated in the Amsterdam Pride Canal Parade.
- Cosmopolitan magazine, a women's magazine, offered sex advice to lesbians for the first time in its history.
- Pascal Tessier, a 17-year-old from Chevy Chase, Maryland, became the first known openly gay Boy Scout to be an Eagle Scout.
- The 100 block of Turk Street was renamed Vicki MarLane after trans activist Vicki Marlane; this was the first time in San Francisco history for a street to be named after a transgender icon.
- The United Church of Christ was the first religious denomination to be a major sponsor of the Gay Games, as a fourth-tier silver sponsor of Gay Games 9.
- The Cleveland Foundation was the first presenting sponsor in the history of the Gay Games.
- Edward Sarafin, a backup offensive lineman at Arizona State, became the first active Division I football player to come out as gay.
- Brie Konrad, formerly Robert Konrad, became the first-known transgender teacher in a southern US state to transition openly on the job.
- Florida-based bank C1 Financial became the first publicly listed bank in the United States to have an openly gay CEO (Trevor Burgess) when its stock became available to trade in August 2014.
- The San Francisco Police academy graduated its first publicly reported transgender police officer, Mikayla Connell.
- Chris Mosier became the first openly transgender man inducted into the National Gay and Lesbian Sports Hall of Fame.
- BBC2 commissioned Britain's first transgender sitcom, called Boy Meets Girl, which follows the developing relationship between Leo, a 26-year-old man and Judy, a 40-year-old transgender woman.
- Maria Walsh came out as gay after being crowned the Rose of Tralee, thus becoming the first openly gay Rose of Tralee.
- Mills College became the first single-sex college in the U.S. to adopt a policy explicitly welcoming transgender students.
- Mauricio Ruiz became the first serving member of the Chilean armed forces to announce he was gay.
- Canadian-based writer and illustrator Eiynah wrote Pakistan's first anti-homophobia children's book, My Chacha Is Gay; she first wrote it online and had it released in print in 2014.
- Hong Kong held its first international symposium on LGBTI rights.
- For the first time in Italian history, a court granted permission for the adoption of a child living with a gay couple. The child was the biological daughter of one of the women in the couple, and her partner was allowed to legally become her co-parent through adoption. The couple had been living together in Rome since 2003, and the decision was taken by Rome's Juvenile Court.
- The memorial honoring LGBTQ people persecuted by the Nazis in Tel Aviv, the first specific recognition in Israel for non-Jewish victims of the Holocaust, was unveiled in 2014.
- The 5th European Transgender Council Meeting was held in Budapest, Hungary – the first such conference to take place in Central and Eastern Europe.
- Mount Holyoke College became the first Seven Sisters college to accept transgender students.
- Mikie Goldstein became the first openly gay man to be ordained as a Conservative Jewish Rabbi. Later that year he became the Israeli Conservative movement's first openly gay congregational rabbi with his installation as spiritual leader of its synagogue in Rehovot (Congregation Adat Shalom-Emanuel).
- Monica Wehby aired the first campaign ad for American national office featuring a same-sex couple (Ben West and Paul Rummell).
- Kinnon MacKinnon became the first openly transgender man to earn a gold in powerlifting at the Gay Games in the 2014 Games.
- ICEIS Rain became the first openly two-spirit person to perform at the Aboriginal Peoples Choice Music Awards.
- Jim Ferlo came out as gay, thus becoming the Pennsylvania Senate's first openly gay legislator.
- Padmini Prakash became India's first openly transgender television news anchor.
- The Equal Employment Opportunity Commission filed two lawsuits against companies accused of discriminating against employees on the basis of gender identity; these lawsuits were the first Title VII action taken by the federal government on behalf of transgender workers. The lawsuits were filed for Amiee Stephens and Brandi Branson, both transgender women.
- The UN Human Rights Council adopted a second resolution related to sexual orientation and gender identity on September 26, 2014. It passed by a vote of 25–14 and became the first time in the Council's history that it adopted a resolution on LGBT rights with the majority of its members.
- In 2014 California became the first state in the U.S. to officially ban the use of trans panic and gay panic defenses in murder trials.
- In 2014 Virginia became the first state in the Southeastern United States to legalize same-sex marriage.
- Luisa Revilla Urcia became the first openly transgender person elected to a public office in Peru when she won a seat on the local council in La Esperanza in the province of Trujillo in northwestern Peru.
- In 2014 Laura Davis Danforth became the first openly LGBTQ person to be appointed Head of School at a boarding school in North America. She and her wife, Paula Chu, will be the first same-sex couple living in a head's house at a boarding school when they officially join the Masters School (NY) community in 2015.
- The Arizona Interscholastic Association Executive Board approved the first transgender student-athlete to play in a winter sport in Arizona.
- Family Circle featured a same-sex couple for the first time in its November 2014 issue.
- Tim Cook, the CEO of Apple Inc., came out as gay, thus becoming the first openly gay CEO on the Fortune 500 list.
- Professional strongman Rob Kearney came out as gay, thus becoming the first openly gay man actively competing in professional, international strongman competitions.
- Maura Healey became the first openly gay state attorney general elected in America (she was elected attorney general of Massachusetts.)
- Susan Collins won reelection, thus becoming the first Republican senator to be reelected while supporting same-sex marriage.
- Lea T became the face of American hair-care brand Redken, thus making her the first openly transgender model to front a global cosmetics brand.
- Edgars Rinkēvičs became the first lawmaker in Latvia to come out as gay, also making him the most prominent openly gay politician in a former Soviet Bloc state.
- A national Centers for Disease Control and Prevention campaign featured an openly transgender person, Jennifer Barge, as its spokesperson for the first time.
- Aditi Hardikar became the first woman of color to serve the White House as their liaison to the LGBT community.
- A contingent of the group OutVets became the first LGBT organization in history to march in Boston's Veterans Day parade.
- At least 1,000 transgender Bangladeshis held Bangladesh's first pride march, to mark one year since the government recognized them as a third gender.
- Derrick Gordon became the first openly gay athlete to play a game in Division I men's basketball.
- Dale Scott came out as gay in 2014, thus becoming the first openly gay umpire in Major League Baseball.
- Poland elected its first openly gay city mayor (Robert Biedroń, elected mayor of Słupsk.)
- Matthew Muir was sworn in as the first openly gay judge to sit on New Zealand's High Court bench.
- The Labor government in Victoria, Australia appointed Martin Foley as Minister of equality, marking the first time an Australian government has ever had a dedicated Minister overseeing gay, lesbian, bisexual, transgender and intersex issues.
- In 2014, Robbie Rogers became the first openly gay male athlete to win a big-time team pro sports title in the United States when the LA Galaxy won the Major League Soccer Cup.
- Andrew Barr became the first openly gay state government leader in Australia after he was sworn in as chief minister of the Australian Capital Territory (ACT).
- Nehirim's first retreat for LGBT rabbis, rabbinic pastors, cantors, and students was held.
- Craig Friesen and Matt Wiens became the first same-sex couple who were members of the Canadian Mennonite Church to have a wedding in their church.
- Los Tigres del Norte released the album Realidades, which contains the song "Era Diferente" (meaning "She Was Different") about a lesbian teenager who falls in love with her best friend; according to lead singer and songwriter Jorge Hernandez, this was the first time a norteño group has ever written a gay love song.
- Denmark became the first European country to remove the Gender Identity Disorder diagnosis as a necessary requirement in the gender recognition process.
- In April 2014, Malta became the first European state to add recognition of gender identity to its constitution as a protected category.
- The first openly transgender woman got married in Malta.
- Blake Brockington became the first openly transgender high school homecoming king in North Carolina.
- Nina Chaubal and Greta Gustava Martela cofounded Trans Lifeline, the first U.S. suicide hotline dedicated to transgender people.
- Tona Brown became the first African-American openly transgender woman to perform at Carnegie Hall.
- Bao Nguyen was elected mayor of Garden Grove, making him the first gay mayor of Garden Grove, as well as its youngest, and its first Vietnamese mayor.
- Grace Banu was the first transgender Dalit person to be admitted to an engineering college in the state of Tamil Nadu, India.

=== 2015 ===
- On May 22, 2015, Michael Sam signed a two-year contract with Montreal Alouettes of the CFL, which made him the first openly gay player in the league's history.
- Michael Sam made his CFL debut on August 7, 2015, against the Ottawa Redblacks, and thus became the first publicly gay player to play in a CFL regular season game. He did not record a tackle in the game.
- Phuti Lekoloane came out and thus became South Africa's first openly gay male footballer.
- Laverne Cox won a Daytime Emmy Award in Outstanding Special Class Special as Executive Producer for Laverne Cox Presents: The T Word. This made her the first openly transgender woman to win a Daytime Emmy as an Executive Producer; in addition, The T Word was the first trans documentary to win a Daytime Emmy.
- Bethany Black became the first openly transgender actress to feature in a leading transgender role on British television in the Channel 4 drama series Cucumber and its companion series Banana.
- Atifulla Khan became Bangalore's first openly transgender cover girl for the June edition of the news magazine tehelka.
- Naaz Joshi became India's first openly transgender cover girl for the June edition of the news magazine tehelka. The story was covered by CNN news in India.
- Madhu Kinnar became India's first openly transgender person to be elected mayor; she was elected mayor of Chhattisgarh's Raigarh Municipal Corporation.
- Leo Varadkar became Ireland's first openly gay government minister.
- Xavier Bettel became the first head of government in the European Union to marry a same-sex partner while in office.
- President Barack Obama became the first president to use the words "lesbian", "bisexual", and "transgender" in a State of the Union speech.
- Zoey Tur joined Inside Edition as a Special Correspondent during February, thus becoming the first openly transgender television reporter on national TV in America.
- Lance Bass and Michael Turchin became the first same-sex couple to exchange vows on cable television.
- Thomas Sawicki and his boyfriend Shawn Brier became the first male same-sex couple chosen to share the first kiss upon a U.S. Navy ship's return.
- Neil Patrick Harris became the first openly gay man to host the Academy Awards.
- On February 12, 2015, USA Today reported that the commandant of Fort Leavenworth wrote in a February 5 memo, "After carefully considering the recommendation that (hormone treatment) is medically appropriate and necessary, and weighing all associated safety and security risks presented, I approve adding (hormone treatment) to Inmate [Chelsea] Manning's treatment plan." According to USA Today, Chelsea Manning remains a soldier, and the decision to administer hormone therapy was a first for the U.S. Army.
- Kate Brown became the first openly bisexual governor in the United States, as governor of Oregon.
- The United States appointed Randy W. Berry as its first Special Envoy for the Human Rights of LGBT Persons.
- Screenwriter Jason Rothenberg of The 100 confirmed that that TV show's lead character, Clarke Griffin (played by Eliza Taylor) was bisexual; this makes her the first openly bisexual lead character on the CW network.
- The first gay groups (Boston Pride and OutVets) marched in Boston's St. Patrick's Day parade.
- In March 2015 Rabbi Denise Eger became the first openly gay president of the Central Conference of American Rabbis, which is the largest and oldest rabbinical organization in North America.
- OUT@NBCUniversal, an organization of gay employees of NBCUniversal, became the first gay group to march in New York City's St. Patrick's Day parade.
- The D.C. Center for the LGBT Community became the first gay group to march in the Washington, D.C. St. Patrick's Day parade.
- In April 2015, Malta became the first country in the world to outlaw sterilization and invasive surgery on intersex people.
- In a first for the state, California's Department of Corrections was ordered by a federal judge to grant a transgender prisoner (Michelle-Lael Norsworthy) access to gender-affirming surgery.
- The White House opens its first gender-neutral restroom.
- The inaugural White House Trans Women Of Color Women's History Month Briefing was held.
- The U.S. Justice Department announced that it had filed its first civil lawsuit on behalf of a transgender person (Rachel Tudor); the lawsuit was United States of America v. Southeastern Oklahoma State University and the Regional University System of Oklahoma, filed in federal court in that state.
- Mikhail Ivan Gallatinov and Mark Goodwin became the first couple to have a same-sex wedding in a UK prison after marrying at Full Sutton Prison in East Yorkshire.
- Pascal Tessier became the first openly gay adult Boy Scout in the nation to be hired as a summer camp leader when he was hired by the Boy Scouts' New York chapter, Greater New York Councils.
- In February 2015, Patricia Velásquez released her memoir Straight Walk, discussing her struggles growing up in poverty in Venezuela and how her relationship with Sandra Bernhard made her realize she was a lesbian. This makes her the world's first openly lesbian Latina supermodel.
- Aisha Moodie-Mills became the new president and CEO of the Victory Fund, which made her the first woman, first black woman, first lesbian, and first black lesbian to become the head of a national leading LGBTQ organization.
- Andreja Pejić became the first openly transgender model profiled by Vogue, in its May 2015 issue.
- Laverne Cox (among others) posed nude for the Allure annual "Nudes" issue, becoming the first openly transgender actress to do so.
- Scott Turner Schofield became the first openly transgender actor to play a major role on daytime television, as the character Nick on the show The Bold and the Beautiful.
- Maka Brown, an 18-year-old senior at the Salt Lake School for Performing Arts, was crowned Utah's first openly transgender prom queen.
- Argentina became Latin America's first nation to recognize same-sex partners and a biological parent on a child's birth certificate; specifically, it allowed a lesbian couple and their son's biological father, who donated sperm for their pregnancy, to be included on the child's birth certificate. The child's name is Antonio and his two mothers are Susana Guichal and Valeria Gaete, and his father is Hernan Melazzi.
- When President Obama declared May to be National Foster Care Month in 2015, he included words never before included in a White House proclamation about adoption, stating in part, "With so many children waiting for loving homes, it is important to ensure all qualified caregivers have the opportunity to serve as foster or adoptive parents, regardless of race, religion, sexual orientation, gender identity, or marital status. That is why we are working to break down the barriers that exist and investing in efforts to recruit more qualified parents for children in foster care." Thus he became the first known U.S. president to explicitly say gender identity should not prevent anyone from adopting or becoming a foster parent.
- Tokyo's Shibuya ward passed a local ordinance granting same-sex couples the right to partnership certificates; this makes it the first place in Japan – or anywhere in East Asia – to recognize same-sex partnerships.
- Azerbaijani Elnur Hüseynov became the first ever openly gay winner of The Voice anywhere in the world winning O Ses Türkiye.
- Ireland became the first country to legalize same-sex marriage by popular vote.
- The first American federally approved monument honoring LGBT veterans was dedicated; it is located at the Abraham Lincoln National Cemetery in Elwood, Illinois.
- Fun Home, the first Broadway musical with a lesbian protagonist, premiered on Broadway.
- Caitlyn Jenner became the first openly transgender woman on the cover of Vanity Fair.
- Chris Mosier became the first known out trans athlete to join a U.S. national team that matched his gender identity, rather than the gender assigned him at birth, when he won a spot on Team USA in the men's sprint duathalon.
- Philadelphia flew the transgender pride flag above City Hall for the first time.
- Manabi Bandyopadhyay, India's first openly transgender college principal, began work as the principal of the Krishnagar Women's College in Nadia district.
- Cambodia got its first LGBT magazine, Q Cambodia.
- Guam became the United States' first overseas territory to recognize same-sex marriage.
- Shawn MacIver and James Moccia became the first openly gay couple to graduate from a police academy together when they graduated from the Boston Police Academy.
- On May 29, 2015, the New York City Landmarks Preservation Commission announced it would officially consider designating the Stonewall Inn as a landmark, the first city location to be considered based on its LGBT cultural significance alone. On June 23, 2015, the New York City Landmarks Preservation Commission unanimously approved the designation of the Stonewall Inn as a city landmark, making it the first landmark honored for its role in the fight for gay rights.
- Audrey Middleton became the U.S. television show Big Brother's first openly transgender houseguest.
- Sean Conroy became the first openly gay baseball player to appear in a professional game; Conroy pitched nine scoreless innings to lead the Sonoma Stompers to a 7–0 win over the Vallejo Admirals in the Pacific Association of Baseball Clubs, an independent league featuring teams from Northern California.
- Laverne Cox became the first openly transgender person to have a wax figure of herself at Madame Tussauds.
- Robby Mook became the first openly gay manager of a major presidential campaign (Hillary Clinton's campaign).
- J. Christopher Neal became the first openly bisexual New York City LGBT Pride March Grand Marshal.
- Thomas Roberts became the first openly gay evening news anchor on network television when he anchored NBC's Nightly News for a day.
- Schools In Transition: A Guide for Supporting Transgender Students in K-12 Schools was introduced; it was a first-of-its-kind publication for school administrations, teachers, and parents about how to provide safe and supportive environments for all transgender students in kindergarten through twelfth grade.
- The UK-based bisexual women's website Biscuit created the Purple List; the first known list of its kind, the Purple List seeks to recognize bisexuals who have contributed to fighting biphobia and increasing bisexual visibility.
- Jacob Anderson-Minshall became the first openly transgender author to win a Goldie award from the Golden Crown Literary Society; he shared the award for best creative non-fiction book with Diane Anderson-Minshall for Queerly Beloved: A Love Story Across Genders.
- Jamaica held its first LGBT Pride celebrations.
- The Bold and the Beautiful's character Maya Avant (played by Karla Mosley) became the first transgender bride to be married on daytime television when she married Rick Forrester (played by Jacob Young).
- Benjamin Thomas Watt from New Zealand became the first openly gay professional boxing judge.
- David Denson came out as gay, making him the first active minor league player affiliated with a Major League Baseball organization to do so.
- Keegan Hirst became the first British rugby league professional to come out as gay.
- Hari Nef became the first openly transgender model signed to IMG.
- Meredith Talusan became BuzzFeed's first openly transgender staff writer.
- President Obama appointed Raffi Freedman-Gurspan to serve as an Outreach and Recruitment Director in the Presidential Personnel Office, making her the first openly transgender appointee to work inside the White House.
- Sam Stanley, nephew of Joe Stanley, became the first English rugby union player to come out as gay.
- Andrew Guy became Australia's first openly transgender TV host, as a guest presenter on The Project.
- Rebecca Root became the first openly transgender actress to play a leading role in a British situation comedy, in the BBC's Boy Meets Girl.
- The Royal Vauxhall Tavern became the first ever building in the UK to be given a special "listing" status based on its LGBT history; it was accorded Grade II listed status by the UK's Department of Culture, Media and Sport.
- The first Scottish LGBTI Awards were held.
- Nancy VanReece won the Metro Council District 8 seat in Nashville, thus becoming the first out lesbian elected to a legislative body in Tennessee.
- Nepal adopted its first democratic constitution, which was the first in Asia to specifically protect the rights of lesbian, gay, bisexual and transgender communities.
- Jeffrey Tambor became the first actor to win an Emmy for portraying a transgender character.
- The first Oscar campaigns for openly transgender actresses supported by a movie producer were launched for actresses Kitana Kiki Rodriguez and Mya Taylor of the movie Tangerine.
- Chris Burns, an assistant coach at Bryant University, came out as gay, thus becoming the first openly gay coach in Division I men's basketball.
- Hollyoaks became the first UK soap to cast an openly transgender actress in a regular role when they cast Annie Wallace as Hollyoaks High School's new head teacher, Sally St. Claire, making her first appearance on 29 October 2015.
- EastEnders became the first UK soap to cast an openly transgender actor in a regular role when they chose Riley Carter Millington to play trans man Kyle Slater, making his first appearance on 30 October 2015.
- Breanna Sinclairé became the first openly transgender person to sing the national anthem at a professional sporting event, which she did at a Major League Baseball game.
- A transgender man's phalloplasty became the first ever seen on camera, in the Channel 4 documentary Girls to Men.
- Inga Beale, CEO of Lloyd's of London, became the first woman and the first openly bisexual person to be named number one in the OUTstanding & FT Leading LGBT executive power list.
- Aydian Dowling became the first openly transgender man on the cover of Men's Health magazine, as part of a special collector's edition.
- Loiza Lamers won "Holland's Next Top Model", making her the first openly transgender winner of the "Top Model" franchise.
- California became the first state in America to agree to pay for transgender prison inmates to receive sexual reassignment surgery.
- The first U.S. congressional forum on anti-transgender violence was held.
- The (American) Department of Veterans Affairs opened its first clinic for transgender service members.
- Tamara Adrián was elected to the Venezuelan National Assembly, thus becoming the first openly transgender Venezuelan to be elected to their national legislature.
- Mya Taylor won the Gotham Award for Breakthrough Actor, making her the first openly transgender actress to win a Gotham award.
- Kael McKenzie was appointed to the Provincial Court of Manitoba, becoming Canada's first out transgender judge.
- Adrianna Vorderbruggen died in combat; she was believed to be the first American active duty, openly gay, female service member to die in combat, and was the first openly gay American Air Force officer to die in combat.
- Jackie Biskupski was elected as the first openly gay mayor of Salt Lake City.
- Abby Stein came out as transgender and thus became the first openly transgender woman (and the first woman) to have been ordained by an ultra-Orthodox institution, having received her rabbinical degree in 2011 from Yeshiva Viznitz in South Fallsburg, New York. However, this was before she was openly transgender, and she no longer worked as a rabbi as of 2016. She was also the first known openly transgender woman raised in a Hasidic community, and is a direct descendant of Hasidic Judaism's founder the Baal Shem Tov.

=== 2016 ===
- Chile's Hugo Alcalde became that country's first gay police officer to have a civil union.
- The 1st annual World LGBT Conference for Criminal Justice Professionals was held in August of this year with the theme of "To Connect And Inspire".
- Through her Foundation, Jennifer Pritzker gave a $2 million donation to create the world's first endowed academic chair of transgender studies, at the University of Victoria in British Columbia; Aaron Devor was chosen as the inaugural chair.
- The house at 219 11th St. SE which was home to The Furies Collective was named as the first lesbian-related historic landmark in Washington, D.C. when it was unanimously voted into the D.C. Inventory of Historic Sites.
- Gopi Shankar Madurai became first openly Indian intersex, genderqueer and gay person to contest in 2016 Tamil Nadu Legislative Assembly election.
- The ceremonial first kiss shared between a sailor and their partner after returning from active duty in the Canadian Navy was done by two men for the first time.
- Maite Oronoz Rodríguez became Puerto Rico's first openly gay chief justice and, as such, the first openly gay chief justice in U.S. history.
- Mya Taylor became the first openly transgender actor to win an Independent Spirit Award; she won for Best Supporting Female.
- Israel held its first transgender beauty pageant, which was called "Miss Trans Israel", and was held at a club in Tel Aviv.
- Australian Prime Minister Malcolm Turnbull became the first sitting Australian Prime Minister to attend the Sydney Gay and Lesbian Mardi Gras.
- Sophie Rebecca became the first openly transgender ballet student to train on the Royal Academy of Dance's courses for female dancers.
- Australian Opposition Leader Bill Shorten became the first leader of a major Australian political party to march in the Sydney Gay and Lesbian Mardi Gras.
- An anonymous couple held the first same-sex wedding in Cyprus.
- Marios Frixou and Fanos Eleftheriades held the first public same-sex wedding in Cyprus.
- Derrick Gordon became the first openly gay man to play in the March Madness tournament.
- Tom Swann and Guillermo Hernandez became the first same-sex couple to marry in a United States federal immigration center.
- It was announced that President Barack Obama had appointed Raffi Freedman-Gurspan as the White House's primary LGBT liaison, making her the first openly transgender person in the role.
- Santa Clara County became the first county government in the U.S. to raise the transgender pride flag.
- Nisha Ayub received the International Women of Courage Award in 2016, becoming the first openly transgender woman to receive that award.
- Aiden Katri, 19, became the first Israeli transgender woman to be jailed for refusing to serve in the military.
- Trans United Fund was founded; it became the first group of its kind, a 501(c)(4) organization of transgender leaders focused on transgender issues.
- The first Jewish same-sex wedding ceremony in Latin America was celebrated in Buenos Aires; the wedding was for Victoria Escobar and Romina Charur and was officiated by Rabbi Karina Finkielstein.
- In the first such ruling in Italy, a lesbian couple won the right to legally adopt each other's biological children.
- Chris Sgro became the first out LGBT person in history appointed to fill a vacancy in the North Carolina General Assembly and the first person to serve in North Carolina's legislature who is legally married to a person of same gender.
- Mullah Taha came out as gay, becoming the first openly queer cleric in Shia Islam.
- Nur Warsame came out and thus became Australia's first openly gay Imam.
- Katherine Zappone became Ireland's first openly lesbian minister.
- Hannah Blythyn, Jeremy Miles, and Adam Price became the first openly gay members of the Welsh Assembly.
- The house of The Furies Collective became the first lesbian site on the National Register of Historic Places.
- Edificio Comunidad de Orgullo Gay became the first Latino LGBT site on the National Register of Historic Places.
- Geraldine Roman became the first openly transgender woman elected to Congress in the Philippines.
- Openly lesbian Brazilian Olympic rugby player Isadora Cerullo became the first person to accept a marriage proposal at an Olympic Games.
- The first female couple in Nicosia to enter into a civil partnership was registered.
- Eric Fanning became the first openly gay Secretary of the United States Army.
- Carl Austin-Behan was sworn in as Manchester's first openly gay Lord Mayor.
- Prince William became the first member of Britain's royal family to appear on the cover of a gay magazine when he appeared on the cover of the July issue of Attitude; in the cover story, he also became the first British royal to openly condemn the bullying of the gay community.
- Amelia Gapin became the first openly transgender woman to be featured on the cover of Women's Running.
- On June 10, 2016, an Oregon circuit court ruled that a resident, Elisa Rae Shupe, could obtain a non-binary gender designation. The Transgender Law Center believes this to be "the first ruling of its kind in the U.S."
- Erin O'Flaherty became the first openly gay Miss Missouri, which also made her the first openly lesbian Miss America candidate.
- Chris Mosier was chosen as the first openly transgender athlete to be featured in the "Body Issue" of ESPN The Magazine.
- On June 24, 2016, President Barack Obama officially designated the Stonewall National Monument, making it the United States' first National Monument designated for an LGBT historic site. The National Monument status encompasses the Stonewall Inn, Christopher Street Park, and the block of Christopher Street bordering the park.
- Hillary Clinton became the first presumptive presidential nominee from any major party to march in the NYC Pride March.
- British Government minister Justine Greening revealed that she was in a same-sex relationship, thus becoming the first out LGB female cabinet minister.
- Caitlyn Jenner became the first openly transgender person on the cover of Sports Illustrated.
- Canadian Prime Minister Justin Trudeau became the first Canadian Prime Minister to march in a pride parade.
- The United Nations voted to create their first LGBT human rights watchdog.
- The UN Security Council condemned the 2016 Orlando nightclub shooting; this statement marked the first time the U.N. Security Council used language recognizing violence targeting the LGBT community.
- Misty Plowright became the first openly transgender candidate to win a major party primary for the US House of Representatives.
- Misty Snow became the first openly transgender candidate to win a major party primary for the US Senate.
- Amanda Nunes became the UFC's first openly gay champion.
- Rachel Hoff became the first openly gay person to sit on the Republican Party's Platform Committee.
- An important legal victory for transgender people occurred in April 2016, when the 4th U.S. Circuit Court of Appeals ruled in favor of transgender male student Gavin Grimm, which marked the first ruling by a U.S. appeals court to find that transgender students are protected under federal laws that ban sex-based discrimination. The ruling came on a challenge to the Gloucester County School Board's policy of making transgender students use alternative restroom facilities.
- The United Methodist church elected its first openly gay bishop, Karen Oliveto.
- A Nickelodeon cartoon, The Loud House, introduced the first animated married same-sex couple to its channel.
- Peter Thiel became the first person to publicly announce to the GOP convention that he is gay.
- Sarah McBride was a speaker at the Democratic National Convention, becoming the first openly transgender person to address a major party convention in American history.
- Elle printed special collectors' covers for their September 2016 issue, and one of them featured Hari Nef, which was the first time an openly transgender woman had been on the cover of a major commercial British magazine.
- Luke Carine and Zak Tomlinson became the first same-sex couple to get married on the Isle of Man.
- Marc and Alan Steffan-Cowell became the first same-sex pair to convert their civil partnership to a marriage on the Isle of Man.
- Lea T became the first openly transgender person ever to participate in the opening ceremonies of an Olympics when she led the Brazilian team into the stadium on her bike during the 2016 Rio Olympics.
- Guðni Th. Jóhannesson (president of Iceland) became the first president of a country to participate in a pride parade when he gave a speech at Reykjavík Pride 2016 in Iceland.
- The Olympics hosted their first same-sex marriage proposal.
- Chris Mosier appeared in Nike's first ad with an openly transgender athlete.
- The British women's field hockey team won gold at the Olympics; as Kate and Helen Richardson-Walsh were both on that team, this made them the first same-sex married couple to win Olympic medals.
- Nicholas Chamberlain was the first bishop in the Church of England to come out as gay, which occurred following threats of an outing from an unnamed Sunday newspaper. He said he lived with his partner in a celibate same-sex relationship, as required by the Bishops' guidelines, under which gay clergy must practice abstinence and may not marry.
- Chansey Paech became Australia's first elected MP to be both Aboriginal and openly gay, which at the time had not happened at either a state, territorial, or federal level. He was a Labor politician from the Northern Territory.
- Ivar Mountbatten came out as gay and revealed that he was in a relationship with James Coyle, an airline cabin services director whom he met whilst at a ski resort in Verbier. While not being a member of the British royal family, he became the first member of the monarch's extended family to come out as gay.
- For the first time two openly gay men ran for parliament in Russia.
- Tracey Norman and Geena Rocero became the first two openly transgender models to appear on the cover of an edition of Harper's Bazaar.
- Hillary Clinton wrote an op-ed for Philadelphia Gay News, which was the first time a major-party presidential candidate wrote an op-ed for an LGBT newspaper.
- Harrison Browne of the National Women's Hockey League came out as a transgender man, which made him the first openly transgender athlete in professional American team sports.
- Along with Martha Raddatz, Anderson Cooper moderated the second presidential election debate between Hillary Clinton and Donald Trump. This made him the first openly gay person to moderate a presidential debate.
- Anwen Muston, British Labour Party politician, was elected to Wolverhampton City Council at the 2016 elections, making her the first openly transgender woman to be elected as a Labour representative.
- Kate Brown was elected as governor of Oregon, and thus became the first openly LGBT person, specifically the first bisexual, elected as a United States governor.
- Amiyah Scott became the first openly trans person to play a trans major character in a scripted television drama series in America with the debut of the show Star.
- in August, using a high-altitude balloon, activists launched the first pride flag into the stratosphere as it floated 21.1 miles (34.1 km).
- The USNS Harvey Milk was officially named at a ceremony in San Francisco on 16 August 2016. It became the first U.S. Navy ship named for an openly gay leader (Harvey Milk, who served as a diving officer in the Navy from 1951 to 1955.)
- Lauren Lubin ran as the first openly non-binary athlete in the New York City Marathon.
- Roberta Cordano became the first openly LGBT person to be president of Gallaudet University.

=== 2017 ===
- Beirut Pride, the first Pride in Lebanon and the Arab World takes place 14–21 May.
- In the 2017 live-action adaptation of Beauty and the Beast, Le Fou is gay, making him the first gay character in a Disney film.
- ABC News aired the first regional network broadcasts of Pride Marches for both Chicago and New York, streaming a portion of these events live wherever access allowed worldwide and making such available for all year round. Previously such had been covered by cable networks. The New York LGBT Pride March organized by Heritage of Pride was nominated for an Emmy award as a Special Event (other than News or Sports).
- The European Court of Human Rights ruled that Russia was in breach of European treaty with their ban of what Russia considered homosexual propaganda instituted in 2013. This was the first significant international LGBT human rights judgement with consequence and effect. There still is no global court that can address such issues on a transnational basis.
- Trystlynn Melanni Barber became the first openly transgender staff member ever employed by the Georgia Department of Corrections.
- The January 2017 issue of National Geographic has a nine-year-old transgender girl on the cover (Avery Jackson), thought to be the first openly transgender person on National Geographic's cover.
- Denmark became the first country in the world to officially remove transgender identities from its list of mental health disorders.
- Ellen Hart, who is openly lesbian, became the first openly LGBT writer to be named a Grand Master by the Mystery Writers of America.
- Jess Herbst, mayor of New Hope, came out as transgender and thus became the first known openly transgender elected official in Texas history.
- Joe Maldonado became the first openly transgender member of the Boy Scouts of America. In 2016, he was rejected from the Cub Scouts for being transgender, but this policy was changed in 2017 after his story became nationally known.
- Gabrielle Tremblay became the first transgender actress ever nominated for a Canadian Screen Award, as Best Supporting Actress for her role in Those Who Make Revolution Halfway Only Dig Their Own Graves (Ceux qui font les révolutions à moitié n'ont fait que se creuser un tombeau).
- Brazilian model Valentina Sampaio became the first openly transgender model on the cover of French Vogue.
- Martina Robledo became the first openly transgender woman to act as a trophy presenter at the Grammys.
- Moonlight became the first LGBT-related film to win the Best Picture award at the Oscars.
- Japan became the first country in the world to elect an openly transgender man to a public office when Tomoya Hosoda was elected as a councillor for the city of Iruma.
- Two openly gay candidates were elected to the Anchorage Assembly (Christopher Constant and Felix Rivera), becoming the first openly LGBT elected officials in Alaska.
- Andy Street became the United Kingdom's first openly gay directly elected metro mayor.
- M Barclay became the first openly non-binary trans person to be commissioned as a Deacon in the United Methodist Church.
- Leo Varadkar became the new Taoiseach (Prime Minister) of Ireland and leader of the Fine Gael party, after winning 51 of the 73 votes in the parliamentary party. He was the first openly gay Taoiseach, as well as the youngest and the first of half-Indian descent. He became the fourth openly LGBT head of government in Europe.
- Paul Feinman became the first openly gay judge on the New York Court of Appeals.
- Alex Hai came out as a transgender man, thus becoming the first openly transgender person to be a gondolier in Venice.
- Ana Brnabić was elected as the first openly gay (and first female) Prime Minister of Serbia.
- Ryan Atkin became the first openly gay official in English soccer.
- San Francisco 49ers assistant coach Katie Sowers came out as gay, thus becoming the NFL's first openly LGBT coach, and the first openly LGBT coach in all of U.S. men's professional sports.
- Scott Frantz became the first openly gay college football player to play in a game for an NCAA Division I Football Bowl Subdivision school.
- In August 2017, the first West Africa LGBT-Inclusive religious gathering occurred. Over 30 participants indigenous to ten West African countries, including Benin, Nigeria, Ghana, Sierra Leone, Liberia, The Gambia, Burkina Faso, Côte d'Ivoire, Mali, and Togo participated in an interfaith diversity event hosted by Interfaith Diversity Network of West Africa with the theme of "Building Bridges, Sharing Stories, Creating Hope"
- MOGA, a Muslim Women's fashion designer, became the First fashion designer in the world to release a rainbow hijab.
- Ana Brnabić became the first head of government of any Balkan country to attend a gay pride march; she attended one in Belgrade.
- Ines Rau became the first openly transgender Playboy Playmate.
- Andrea Jenkins became the first openly transgender black woman elected to public office in the United States when she was elected to the Minneapolis City Council.
- The United States Defense Health Agency for the first time approved payment for sex reassignment surgery for an active-duty U.S. military service member. The patient, an infantry soldier who identifies as a woman, had already begun a course of treatment for gender reassignment. The procedure, which the treating doctor deemed medically necessary, was performed on November 14 at a private hospital, since U.S. military hospitals lack the requisite surgical expertise.
- Tyler Titus, a transgender man, became the first openly transgender person elected to public office in Pennsylvania when he was elected to the Erie School Board. He and Phillipe Cunningham, elected to the Minneapolis City Council on the same night, became the first two openly trans men to be elected to public office in the United States.
- America's first all-LGBT city council was elected in Palm Springs, consisting of three gay men, a transgender woman and a bisexual woman.
- David J. Glawe was confirmed on August 3, 2017, by the United States Senate and sworn in by President Trump. He became the highest ranking out gay US Official in United States history as the Under Secretary for Intelligence at the Department of Homeland Security. He reports directly to both the Secretary of Homeland Security and the Director of National Intelligence. On 28 June 2017 during his televised Senate confirmation hearing he introduced his husband and two children.
- Marshall Bang became the first singer in Korea to debut as an openly gay musician.
- Andi Mack became the first Disney show to feature a gay character when Cyrus revealed he had feelings for another character, Jonah, on the show.
- November 28, 2017, Prime Minister Justin Trudeau offered a formal apology to the Canadian LGBTQ2S community in the House of Commons. Criminal records from the Purge targeting individuals for their sexual orientation that occurred from the 1950s through the 1990s would be expunged and reparations were to begin for civil servant and military personnel as agreed after a civil action lawsuit in the amount of 110 million Canadian dollars.

=== 2018 ===
- Danica Roem, on January 10, was officially sworn-in to the Virginia House of Delegates, becoming the first openly transgender person to be elected and serve in a state legislature in U.S. history.
- Deidre Downs became the first former Miss America national titleholder to enter a same-sex marriage.
- Wyatt Pertuset became the first openly gay college football player to score a touchdown.
- This year was the first time in the history of the Winter Olympics that male athletes competed who were openly gay.
- Silvia Vasquez-Lavado became the first openly gay woman to complete the Seven Summits, the tallest mountain on each continent from both the Messner and Bass lists.
- Megan Hunt, who was openly bisexual, became the first openly LGBTQ person elected to the state legislature of Nebraska.
- Adam Rippon became the United States's first openly gay athlete ever to qualify for any Winter Olympics. That year he won an Olympic bronze medal as part of the figure skating team event, thus becoming the first openly gay U.S. athlete to win a medal at the Winter Olympics.
- Canadian Women's Hockey League player Jessica Platt came out as a transgender woman, thus making her the first transgender woman to come out in North American professional hockey.
- Daniel Hall and Vinny Franchino became the first active-duty, same-sex couple to marry at West Point.
- Yance Ford and Joslyn Barnes were nominated for the Academy Award for Best Documentary Feature for producing Strong Island, which he also directed. As such, Ford was the first openly transgender man to be nominated for any Academy Award, and the first openly transgender director to be nominated for any Academy Award.
- Laverne Cox became the first openly transgender person to appear on the cover of any Cosmopolitan magazine (specifically, Cosmopolitan South Africa's February 2018 issue).
- Paris Lees became the first openly transgender woman featured in British Vogue.
- Holland, the first openly gay K-pop singer, debuted his first single, "Neverland".
- Dee Rees and Virgil Williams were nominated for the Academy Award for Best Adapted Screenplay for Mudbound, which made Rees, a lesbian, the first queer black woman to be nominated for any Academy Award in a writing category.
- Rachel Morrison became the first woman ever nominated for the Academy Award for Best Cinematography, and thus, as she was a lesbian, the first lesbian as well.
- Thos Shipley and Joe DeIorio, First openly gay married couple to serve elected public office together for the same municipality (Borough Council): Roselle Park, New Jersey, 2018.
- Canadian Eric Radford became the first openly gay man to win a gold medal at any Winter Olympics.
- Transgender Health reported that a transgender woman in the United States breastfed her adopted baby; this was the first known case of a transgender woman breastfeeding.
- Jacinda Ardern became the first prime minister of New Zealand to march in a gay pride parade.
- Daniela Vega became the first openly transgender person in history to be a presenter at the Academy Awards.
- Love, Simon was released as the first film ever released by a major studio to focus on a gay teenage romance.
- Toni Atkins succeeded Kevin de León as Senate President Pro Tempore. This made her the first woman and the first openly LGBTQ person (she was a lesbian) to lead the California State Senate.
- Marvia Malik became the first openly transgender newsreader to appear on Pakistani television in 2018.
- St. John's Centre MHA Gerry Rogers became the first openly LGBT person to lead a political party in Newfoundland and Labrador.
- Todd Harrity came out as gay, thus becoming the first openly gay professional male squash player in the world.
- Raquel Pennington faced Amanda Nunes on May 12, 2018 at UFC 224 in a UFC Women's Bantamweight Championship bout. Pennington lost the fight via TKO in the fifth round. This was the first event in UFC history to be headlined by two openly gay fighters.
- In June 2018, Meghan Stabler was the first transgender woman to be honored with the Bettie Naylor National Visibility Award, given for her work in advocating LGBTQ equality. Stabler served on the Human Rights Campaign's (HRC) National Board of Directors for more than eight years. The award was named for Bettie Naylor, who was a longtime advocate and lobbyist for the rights of women and the LGBTQ community.
- The Vatican used the acronym LGBT in an official document for the first time.
- Sue Bird and Megan Rapinoe became the first same-sex couple on the cover of ESPN's Body Issue.
- Angela Ponce made history on 29 June 2018 as the first openly transgender woman to be crowned Miss Spain.
- Angela Ponce represented her country at Miss Universe 2018 as the first openly transgender contestant competing for the title.
- Sharon Afek became the Israel Defense Forces' first openly gay major general.
- Land O'Lakes named Beth Ford its first female CEO, making her the first openly gay woman CEO to run a Fortune 500 company.
- Bradley Kim of the Air Force Academy came out as gay, thus becoming the first openly gay football player to play for any military academy in the United States.
- Mike Jacobs became the first sitting judge in the United States to come out as bisexual.
- Peppermint made her Broadway debut in The Go-Go's-inspired musical Head Over Heels. The show began previews on June 23, 2018, and officially opened July 26; playing the role of Pythio, Peppermint became the first trans woman to originate a principal role on Broadway.
- Christine Hallquist became the first openly transgender candidate for governor nominated by a major political party in the United States when she was nominated for governor of Vermont by the Democrats.
- A bill was signed into law designating the LGBTQ Veterans Memorial in Desert Memorial Park as California's official LGBTQ veterans memorial. Due to this, California became the first state in the nation to officially recognize LGBTQ military veterans.
- Kyrsten Sinema became the first openly bisexual person to win a major party nomination to run for a U.S. Senate seat.
- Kyrsten Sinema became the first openly bisexual person elected to the U.S. Senate.
- Tadd Fujikawa came out as gay during a post on Instagram, becoming the first male professional golfer to publicly come out as gay.
- Yance Ford and Joslyn Barnes were awarded an Emmy for Exceptional Merit in Documentary Filmmaking for producing Strong Island, which made Ford the first openly transgender man and the first black openly transgender person to win an Emmy award, as well as the first openly transgender filmmaker to win a Creative Arts Emmy.
- Lord Ivar Mountbatten married his same-sex partner, James Coyle, on the 22 of September 2018, becoming the first member of the British monarch's extended family to have a same-sex wedding.
- America's first city-wide Bi Pride event was held, in West Hollywood.
- Graça Fonseca became the first openly gay government minister in Portugal.
- Katie Hill was elected as California's first openly bisexual person, and first openly queer woman, to be a member of Congress.
- Xavier Bettel became the first openly gay Prime Minister in the world to be re-elected for a second term.
- Etienne Schneider became the first openly gay deputy Prime Minister in the world to be re-elected for a second term.
- Jared Polis won election as governor of Colorado, becoming the first openly gay person elected governor of any US state. (He was not, however, the first gay person to serve as a state governor; on August 12, 2004, Jim McGreevey, 52nd Governor of New Jersey, came out as gay during a speech announcing his resignation.)
- Sharice Davids was elected as the first openly gay Native American in the US Congress, the first openly LGBTQ member of the Kansas congressional delegation, and the first openly gay person representing Kansas on the federal level.
- Angie Craig became the first openly lesbian mother to be elected to the US Congress, and the first openly gay person elected to Congress from Minnesota.
- Chris Pappas was elected to be the first openly gay person representing Congress for New Hampshire.
- Teri Johnston was elected to be the first openly lesbian mayor of Key West, Florida.
- Ahmad Zahra was elected to Fullerton, California city council, thus becoming the first openly gay Muslim to be elected to office in the USA
- Patricio Manuel became the first openly transgender male to box professionally in the United States, and, as he won the fight, the first openly transgender male to win a pro boxing fight in the U.S.
- Colombia prosecuted a transgender woman's murder as a femicide for the first time in 2018, sentencing Davinson Stiven Erazo Sánchez to twenty years in a psychiatric center for "aggravated femicide" a year after he killed Anyela Ramos Claros, a transgender woman.
- Ricardo Lara was elected as California's insurance commissioner, making him the first openly gay person elected to statewide office in California's history.
- Neighbours became the first Australian TV show to air a scripted same-sex wedding with the wedding of characters David Tanaka and Aaron Brennan on-screen in September.
- On 9 June, around 30 to 40 researchers, 12 of whom identified as LGBT, held the first Pride celebration at a bar in McMurdo Station in the Ross Dependency, making it the first pride celebration in Antarctica.
- Caitlin Kinnunen and Isabelle McCalla, cast members of The Prom, ended their performance at the Macy's Thanksgiving Day Parade with the Macy's Thanksgiving Day Parade's first same-sex kiss.
- Stav Strashko became the first openly transgender actress ever to receive an Ophir Award nomination for Best Actress.
- Jesse James Keitel played TV Land's first non-binary character on Younger.
- Ariel Nicholson became the first openly transgender model to walk in a Calvin Klein fashion show.
- Lucy Clark came out as a transgender woman, thus making her the first openly transgender soccer referee in history.

=== 2019 ===
- Taiwan became the first country in Asia to legalise same-sex marriage.
- Pete Buttigieg became the first ever openly gay Democratic presidential candidate in American history.
- Pete Buttigieg became the first openly gay presidential candidate in a nationally televised American presidential debate.
- Ahead of the 2019 Tunisian presidential election, lawyer and LGBT activist Mounir Baatour became the first openly gay male candidate to run for President in Tunisia and the Arab World.
- On 1 February David Miranda, a black openly gay representative, replaced Jean Wyllys, since Wyllys announced in January 2019 that he left the country due to death threats. This was the first time that an openly gay representative was replaced by another openly gay representative in Brazil.
- Ek Ladki Ko Dekha Toh Aisa Laga was released; it was the first mainstream Indian film to deal with a lesbian relationship.
- Serbian Prime Minister Ana Brnabić's partner Milica Djurdjic gave birth to a boy; Brnabić is therefore believed to be the first prime minister in a same-sex couple whose partner gave birth while the prime minister was in office.
- Army Capt. Alivia Stehlik, Navy Lt. Cmdr. Blake Dremann, Army Capt. Jennifer Peace, Army Staff Sgt. Patricia King and Navy Petty Officer 3rd Class Akira Wyatt became the first openly transgender members of the United States military to testify publicly in front of Congress.
- On April 2, 2019 Lori Lightfoot was elected Chicago, Illinois' first openly gay mayor.
- Satya Rhodes-Conway was elected Madison, Wisconsin's first openly gay mayor.
- Jane Castor was elected as Tampa, Florida's first openly gay mayor.
- Co-director of Avengers: Endgame Joe Russo (credited as Gozie Agbo) has a cameo appearance in that film as a man grieving the sudden loss of a loved one, which was the first time an openly gay character has been portrayed in a Marvel Cinematic Universe film.
- Lillian Bonsignore became the first openly gay and the first female chief of EMS Operations for the New York City Fire Department.
- Jeanine Nicholson became San Francisco's first openly LGBT fire chief.
- Indya Moore became the first openly transgender person to be featured on the cover of the U.S. version of Elle magazine.
- Megan Rapinoe became the first openly gay woman in the annual Sports Illustrated swimsuit issue.
- Andy Brennan became the first male Australian soccer player to come out as gay.
- Lucia Lucas, normally based in Germany, made her debut as Don Giovanni with the Tulsa Opera, becoming the first openly transgender person to sing a lead role in a standard operatic work in the US.
- Rocketman premiered; the film made Paramount the first major Hollywood studio to show gay male sex onscreen.
- Dutee Chand became the first Indian athlete to publicly state that she is in a same-sex relationship.
- Gianmarco Negri was elected mayor of Tromello, making him elected as Italy's first openly transgender mayor.
- Utah County Commissioner Nathan Ivie came out as gay, making him the first openly gay Republican officeholder in Utah history.
- Antonio Brown was elected as Atlanta's first openly bisexual councilman.
- Meghan Stabler became the first openly transgender member of Planned Parenthood's National Board of Directors.
- Prince Harry and Meghan Markle became the first British royals known to celebrate LGBT Pride Month.
- In June 2019, in celebration of LGBT Pride Month, Governor Andrew Cuomo ordered that the LGBT pride flag be raised over the New York State Capitol for the first time in New York State history.
- In June 2019, Advocate magazine editors named Meghan Stabler, a transgender woman and senior business executive, as one of The Advocate Magazine's 2019 Champions of Pride.
- In June, LGBT pride flags flew outside the George W. Romney building, the main office of Governor of Michigan Gretchen Whitmer, for the first time.
- In June, Governor of Wisconsin Tony Evers issued an executive order stating that the LGBT pride flag will be flown over the Wisconsin State Capitol, for the first time.
- In June, openly gay Governor of Colorado Jared Polis displayed the LGBT flag on the Colorado State Capitol, for the first time.
- Amir Ohana became the first openly gay person to be appointed as a minister in the Israeli government.
- Bonnie Perry became the first woman and first openly gay priest elected as an Episcopal bishop in Michigan.
- In June 2019, President of Austria Alexander Van der Bellen became the first Head of State to address a EuroPride parade.
- In June, Minister of Education, Science and Research Iris Eliisa Rauskala came out as lesbian and announced that she was married to a woman, thus becoming the first openly LGBT minister in the Government of Austria.
- Leyna Bloom's feature film debut in Port Authority at the Cannes Film Festival was the first time a trans woman of color was in a leading role in the festival's history.
- Nyla Rose became the first openly transgender woman to sign with a major American professional wrestling promotion when she signed with All Elite Wrestling (AEW).
- Janet Mock signed a three-year deal with Netflix giving them exclusive rights to her TV series and a first-look option on feature film projects; this made her the first openly transgender woman of color to secure a deal with a major content company.
- Geena Rocero became the first openly transgender Asian-Pacific Islander model to pose for Playboy magazine.
- North Macedonia had its first gay pride march.
- Nitzan Horowitz successfully challenged incumbent Tamar Zandberg for the leadership of Meretz, which made Meretz the first Israeli party to elect an openly gay person as its leader.
- Alison van Uytvanck and Greet Minnen, both from Belgium, became the first openly gay couple to team up in the doubles at Wimbledon.
- Nigeria's first lesbian-focused documentary film premiered, called Under the Rainbow, and largely focuses on the life of Pamela Adie, an out Nigerian lesbian.
- The Discovery Family cartoon series My Little Pony had a same-sex couple on the show for the first time; this occurred in the episode "The Last Crusade," with a lesbian couple, Aunt Holiday and Auntie Lofty.
- Zach Barack became the first openly transgender actor in the Marvel Universe when he played a classmate of Peter Parker's in Spider-Man: Far From Home.
- Stefanie Horvath became the first openly lesbian brigadier general in the Minnesota Army National Guard.
- Taiga Ishikawa was elected to the House of Councillors in the 2019 Japanese House of Councillors election, becoming the first openly-gay man to be elected to either chamber of the National Diet.
- Laverne Cox was one of fifteen women chosen by guest editor Meghan, Duchess of Sussex to appear on the cover of the September 2019 issue of British Vogue; this made Cox the first openly transgender woman to appear on the cover of British Vogue.
- Valentina Sampaio was hired by Victoria's Secret as their first openly transgender model in August 2019.
- After a performance of The Prom at Broadway's Longacre Theatre, Broadway's first-known onstage wedding occurred on that stage; it was a wedding between two women, and was Broadway's first-known onstage same-sex wedding.
- MJ Rodriguez became the first openly transgender woman to win Best Actress - Television at the Imagen Awards.
- Univision premiered its first gay-led primetime telenovela, entitled El corazón nunca se equivoca (The Heart is Never Wrong).
- On August 17, 2019, in an op-ed to the Ottawa Citizen, Jim Watson announced that he was coming out of the closet, becoming Ottawa's first openly gay mayor.
- Songs of Praise showed its first gay wedding, which was the wedding of Jamie Wallace and Ian McDowall at the Rutherglen United Reformed Church in Glasgow.
- Bachelor in Paradise featured its first same-sex romance.
- Lil Nas X came out as gay, making him the first artist to have done so while having a number-one record.
- Old Town Road by Lil Nas X featuring Billy Ray Cyrus was nominated by the Country Music Association Awards in the category of Musical Event of the Year; this made Lil Nas X the first openly gay man to be nominated at the Country Music Association Awards.
- Teddy Quinlivan became the first openly transgender model to be hired by Chanel.
- On August 23, 2019, The New York Times reported a complaint against Anne McClain through the Federal Trade Commission accusing her of illegally accessing financial information while residing in the International Space Station. This accusation "outed" McClain as an LGBTQ woman, making her the first openly LGBT NASA astronaut.
- June Eastwood became the first openly male-to-female transgender athlete to compete in NCAA Division I cross country; she competed for the University of Montana women's team.
- Albert Nabonibo came out as gay, making him Rwanda's first openly gay gospel singer.
- Billy Porter was nominated for and won the Primetime Emmy Award for Outstanding Lead Actor in a Drama Series for Pose, becoming the first openly gay black man to be nominated and win in any lead acting category at the Primetime Emmys.
- A Little Late with Lilly Singh premiered on September 16, 2019; as such, Singh became 'the first late-night host to ever publicly identify as bisexual.
- Bosnia and Herzegovina's first pride event was held on 8 September 2019 in the capital Sarajevo.
- Angelica Ross became the first openly transgender person to host an American presidential forum.
- London's first Trans Pride march was held.
- Mattel launched the world's first line of gender-neutral dolls, which they marketed as Creatable World.
- Swe Zin Htet became the first openly lesbian woman to compete in Miss Universe. Patricia Yurena Rodríguez of Spain competed in Miss Universe 2013, but did not come out until after the competition.
- Toronto Police Const. Myles Glazier was hired as the service's first openly transgender member.
- Marvel's Hero Project, a documentary web television series by Marvel New Media for Disney+, gave every child who featured in the show their own Marvel comic; this included a transgender girl called Rebekah, whose comic featuring a superhero version of herself called Mighty Rebekah thus featured Marvel's first transgender hero.
- Bernd Mönkebüscher became the first Catholic priest in Germany who outed himself in public without problems by his bishop, in February 2019.
- Pierre Valkering became the first Catholic priest in the Netherlands who outed himself in public.
- Amanda Sauer-Cook became the first openly gay referee to work in a major professional football league, when she served as a center judge for the Alliance of American Football.
- Brandon Hilton became the first openly gay fashion designer from South Carolina to show a collection at New York Fashion Week.
- Saige Martin and Jonathan Melton became the first openly gay men to serve on the Raleigh City Council.
- Christine Hug became the first openly transgender person to serve as an officer in the Swiss Army.

== See also ==
- List of LGBT firsts by year
- History of homosexuality
- History of lesbianism
- History of bisexuality
- History of transgender people
- History of intersex
- History of cross-dressing

== Bibliography ==
- Gallo, Marcia M. Different Daughters: A History of the Daughters of Bilitis and the Rise of the Lesbian Rights Movement. California: Seal Press, 2007. ISBN 1580052525
- Ochs, Robyn and Rowley, Sarah. Getting Bi: Voices of Bisexuals Around the World, second edition. Massachusetts: Bisexual Resource Center, 2009. ISBN 978-0-9653881-5-3
- Tobin, Kay and Wicker, Randy. The Gay Crusaders. New York: Paperback Library, 1972; Arno, 1975 ISBN 0-405-07374-7
- Stryker, Susan. Transgender History. California: Seal Press, 2008. ISBN 978-1580052245
