= Saul Levin =

South African psychiatrist and business executive

Saul M. Levin is a South African psychiatrist and business executive who works in the United States. He has worked in private consulting and in government administration. Since 2013, he has been the CEO and medical director of the American Psychiatric Association.

== Education ==
Levin was born in South Africa and received his medical degree from the University of the Witwatersrand in 1982. He then moved to the United States to complete a residency in psychiatry at UC Davis Medical Center. He completed a master's degree in public administration at the John F. Kennedy School of Government of Harvard University in 1994.

== Career ==
Between his qualification as a psychiatrist and his master's degree, Levin worked for the United States Department of Health and Human Services, where he was the coordinator of a program for the Substance Abuse and Mental Health Services Administration. When he finished his master's degree, he founded a healthcare consulting firm, Access Consulting International, which he headed for ten years. He then served as the president and CEO of Medical Education for South African Blacks, a U.S.-based charitable trust that offered scholarships to black South African healthcare students. He also served as the Vice President for Science, Medicine and Public Health in the American Medical Association.

In July 2012, Vincent C. Gray, then Mayor of the District of Columbia, appointed Levin as interim director of the District of Columbia Department of Health. A year later, in mid-2013, Levin was named the CEO and medical director of the American Psychiatric Association (APA); since joining the association in 1987 he had served on several APA committees.

== Personal life ==
Levin is openly gay. His appointment as the CEO and medical director of the APA made him the first openly gay person to hold the position, and possibly the first openly gay person to lead an American national medical specialty society.
