= Medical Education for South African Blacks =

Defunct nonprofit organization

Medical Education for South African Blacks (MESAB) was a 501(c)(3) organization that operated from 1985 to 2007. MESAB was a collaborative effort by Americans and South Africans to support the training of black South Africans in the health professions in an effort to improve health care for the black African population of South Africa. MESAB provided scholarships for black South African students at 26 South African universities and technikons, along with sundry training initiatives in community health clinics. MESAB was founded in 1985 by retired diplomat Herbert Kaiser and his wife Joy Kaiser and closed its doors in 2007. At the time of MESAB's founding, South Africa's apartheid policies dictated separate health facilities for blacks. These facilities were underfunded, underequipped, and understaffed compared with those provided to whites.

== Accomplishments ==
From 1985-2007, MESAB's scholarship program provided a total of 11,243 grants (or, "bursaries") to needy students at 26 South African universities and technikons. In addition:

- It pioneered South Africa's first mentor program to help students succeed. 6,000 students received guidance at 17 South African universities and technikons.
- It supported advanced training for nurses in midwifery and neonatal care.
- It encouraged and contributed to university rural outreach programs.
- Its palliative care initiative promoted and supported home-based care for dying AIDS victims and training for doctors in palliative care.
- It established awards for academic and professional achievement by black health professionals.

== Founding context ==
MESAB was founded by Herbert Kaiser, a retired diplomat, and his wife Joy. They believed that additional black health professionals would immediately improve access to health care and that these new caregivers would play a greater role in formulating health policy and become leaders in a post-apartheid future. In 1984 there were fewer than 350 black doctors in a black population of over 20 million. Blacks comprised 70% of the population, but only 3% of all doctors were black. The following statistics illuminate the problem:

- Black life expectancy was 15 years less than for whites.
- Maternal mortality was ten times greater for blacks than for whites.
- Infant mortality was as high as 190 babies compared with 13.4 for white infants.
- Deaths under the age of four: 55 percent of all deaths among blacks compared with 7 percent for whites.
- Limited access to health care meant that blacks were dying from preventable diseases like TB, typhoid, gastroenteritis, and measles that were virtually eliminated in the white population.
- Occupancy rates of 150% at hospitals for blacks were common, which often meant one in the bed and one on the floor.

== Board structure ==
The US Board of Directors was drawn from the worlds of medicine, academia, civil rights organizations, and business. Its role was to establish broad policy guidelines and raise funds. The first Chairman of the Board was Donald Kennedy, then president of Stanford University and former Director of the Federal Food and Drug Administration. He was succeeded by Dr. Louis W. Sullivan, president of the Morehouse School of Medicine and former US Secretary of Health and Human Services.

The South African Council recommended and administered MESAB programs, among them financial aid and personal counseling. Its first Chairman was Professor Phillip V. Tobias, the noted paleoanthropologist and long-time opponent of apartheid. He was succeeded by Professor Mervyn Shear, who was followed by Dr. Nthato Motlana, a civic leader in Soweto and a close associate of Nelson Mandela. Council members were leaders of medical, educational, business, and community organizations.

== Funding ==
Funding for MESAB came from corporate, foundation, and individual donors. Major contributors included Peter Bing, Peter Kovler, George Soros, David Tabatznik Bristol-Myers Squibb, Coca-Cola Co., Ford Motor Company, Henry Schein Inc., Hewlett Packard, Johnson & Johnson, Kaiser Permanente, Kellogg Foundation, Levi Strauss & Co., Pfizer, the Starr Foundation, and USAID, among many others. Over its 22 years of operations, MESAB raised over $27 million to help over 10,000 black students enter the health professions. Its graduates are now doctors, nurses, dentists, pharmacists, and other skilled caregivers responding to the health needs of all South Africans, especially those of black communities previously denied access to healthcare.
