= Chris Mosier =

American triathlete (born 1980)

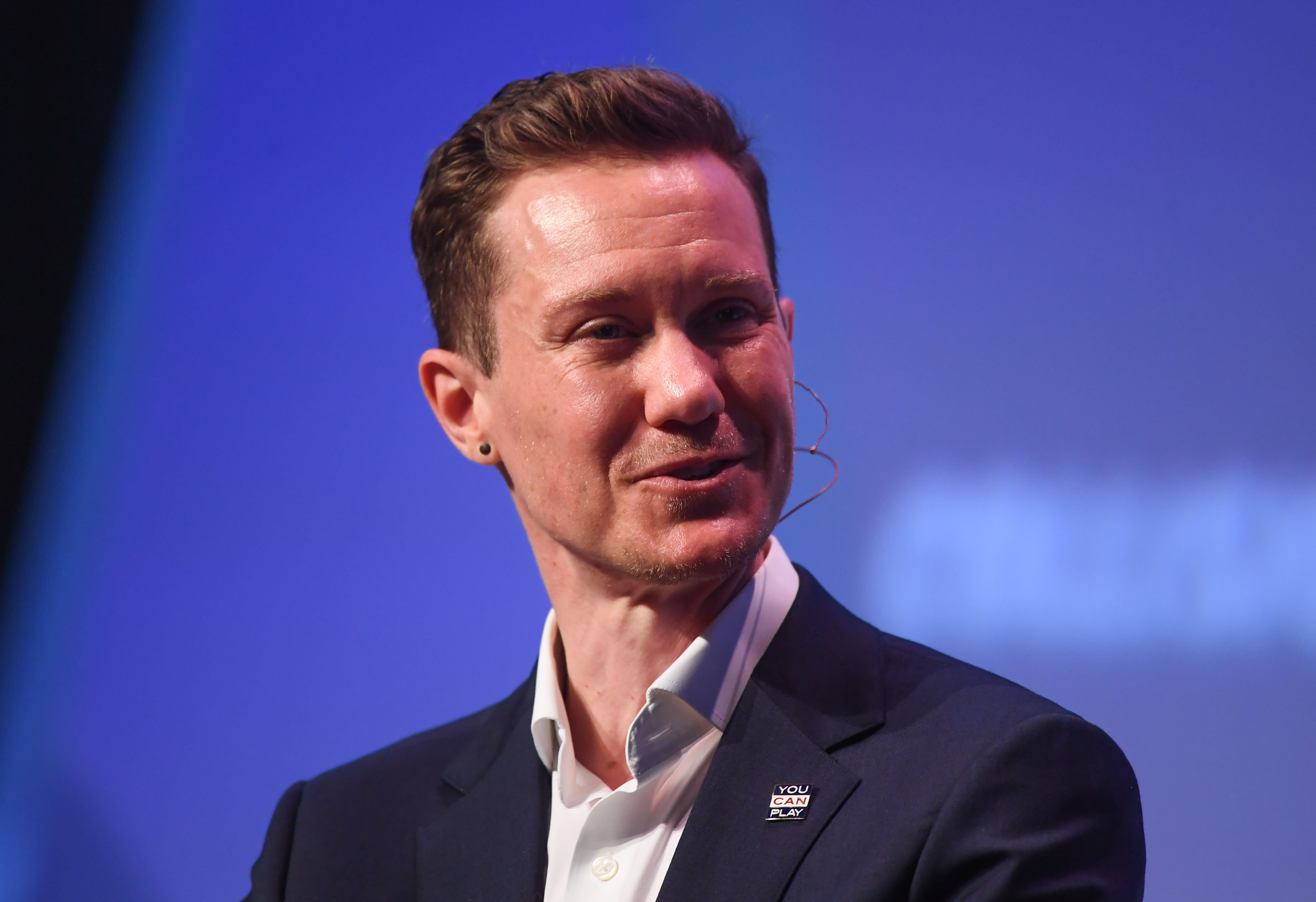
- Mosier in 2018

Personal information
- Born: 1980 (age 45–46) Chicago, Illinois
- Spouse: Zhen Heinemann

Sport
- Sport: Running
- Events: Triathlon, duathlon
- College team: Northern Michigan University

Chris Mosier (born 1980) is an American advocate for transgender rights and competitive triathlete, duathlete, and racewalker. He started his athletic career before transitioning, started his transition in 2010, and in 2015 earned a spot on the Team USA sprint duathlon men's team for the 2016 World Championship in the men's 35-39 age group division, making him the first known out trans athlete to join a U.S. national team different from his sex at birth.

Mosier began competing in triathlon in 2009 as female. In 2010, Mosier publicly self-identified as a transgender man in The Advocate, an American LGBTQ+ magazine, after competing in his first race as male. In 2011 Mosier was featured in The New York Times prior to competing in the Nautica New York City Triathlon, a race he competed in two years prior as a woman. In 2016 Mosier was chosen as the first openly transgender athlete to be featured in the "Body Issue" of ESPN The Magazine.

While he qualified, Mosier was uncertain about his eligibility to compete in the Duathlon World Championship Race in Spain in June 2016 due to the International Olympic Committee policy around the participation of transgender athletes, with specific provisions from the Stockholm Consensus in 2004. In 2015, Mosier challenged the policy, resulting in the creation and adoption of new IOC guidelines for the participation of transgender athletes. Mosier was considered the catalyst for change in the policy in January 2016, after he successfully advocated for change in the policy to allow his participation in the World Championship and future races. Following the policy change, in 2016 Mosier raced in the International Triathlon Union Sprint Duathlon World Championship race in Aviles, Spain, becoming the first known transgender athlete to compete in a World Championship race.

In 2020 Mosier became the first openly transgender man to ever compete in an Olympic trial against men; however, he was unable to finish the Racewalking event due to injury.

== Activism ==
Mosier is the founder of transathlete.com, a resource for students, athletes, coaches, and administrators to find information about trans inclusion in athletics at various levels of play. He also works with LGBTQ sports leagues to improve transgender inclusion. Mosier has spoken across the world about inclusion in sports, his experience as a transgender athlete, athlete activism, and creating more inclusive spaces.

In 2019, Mosier joined the Board of Directors of Point of Pride, a non-profit that works to benefit trans people in need through gender-affirming support programs that empower them to live more authentically.

Mosier was previously the Vice President of Program Development and Community Relations for You Can Play, an organization that works to ensure the safety and inclusion of all in sports - including LGBTQ athletes, coaches, and fans.

Previously, Mosier was the executive director of GO! Athletes, a national non-profit network of current and former LGBTQ high school and college student-athletes which creates safer spaces in athletics through visibility, education, and advocacy.

== Gender transition ==
Mosier struggled with gender identity at a young age. He knew at the age of four that his gender identity (male) and assigned sex (female) did not match. He began his transition in 2010 when he legally changed his name, and then began a medical transition. Although many assumed that making this transition would make Mosier a "middle of the pack" athlete, he has been able to excel in the men's category.

Mosier spoke about his experience with Chicago Go Pride, saying, "Competing as a woman, I thought about gender all the time, to a point where it interfered with my ability to be successful because I didn't feel comfortable at races. Now, I feel more able to focus and gender doesn't come up as much."

== Coaching activity ==
Mosier is a USA Triathlon certified coach. He was a coach and ambassador for the Empire Triathlon Club in NYC from 2012 to 2016, and in 2017 began coaching at EDGE Athlete Lounge in Chicago, Illinois. In 2014, he was named 2014's Best Personal Trainer of the Northeast by Competitor magazine.

== Athletic achievements ==
Mosier made Team USA for the first time in sprint duathlon in 2015. He made the long course duathlon team in 2016 at a race in Cary, North Carolina. Mosier made his fourth Team USA team in long course duathlon in the 2017 National Championship, where he placed 2nd.

In 2016, Mosier earned All-American honors in duathlon.

In 2019, Mosier won two National Championships in Race Walking.

In 2020, Mosier competed in the US Olympic Team Trials for the 50k Racewalk event; however, he was unable to finish the race due to injury. As such, he became the first known transgender athlete to compete in the Olympic Trials in the gender with which they identify.

In 2023, Mosier won the men's 40-44 category of the National Championship at the USA Triathlon Duathlon Gravel National Championship race in Fayetteville, Arkansas.

== Awards and recognition ==
- 2011: Finalist for the Compete Magazine Athlete of the Year award
- 2011: Honorable mention, 2011 USAT Spirit of Multisport Awards, USA Triathlon
- 2013: Athlete of the Year, Compete Sports Diversity Awards
- 2014: Trans 100 list
- 2014: First openly transgender man inducted into the National Gay and Lesbian Sports Hall of Fame
- 2014: The Advocate's "40 Under 40" list
- 2014: Best Personal Trainer of the Northeast, Competitor magazine
- 2015: Jeff Jewell Spirit of Multisport award, USA Triathlon
- 2016: Outsports Person of the Year
- 2016: Out magazine OUT100 list
- 2016: All-American honors in duathlon.
- 2017: Sports Pillar Award, World OutGames Miami
- 2018: Named as a Beyond Sport Ambassador
- 2022: Alumni Service Award, Northern Michigan University
- 2023: Honored at the Athlete Ally Action Awards
- 2024: The Cornerstone of Equality 2024 Award, Greater Boston PFLAG
