= Madhu Kinnar =

Indian politician

Madhu Bai Kinnar
- Born: 1980 (age 45–46)
- Occupation: Politician
- Known for: India's first openly transgender mayor

Madhu Bai Kinnar is an Indian politician who served as the mayor of Raigarh in Chhattisgarh, India. In 2015, running as an independent candidate, Madhu won the mayor election of the Raigarh Municipal Corporation, securing 33,168 votes and defeating the nearest rival, the ruling party BJP's Mahaveer Guruji, by 4,537 votes. She is India's first openly transgender mayor.

== Prior to elections ==
Madhu Bai was previously known as Naresh Chauhan and has an eighth-grade education. As a teenager, Madhu left her family to join the hijra, transgender communities indigenous to South Asia. She belongs to the Dalit community in India.

Before assuming office, Madhu Bai earned a living by taking up odd jobs and by singing and dancing on the streets of Raigarh and performing in trains going on the Howrah-Mumbai route. She ran for mayor's office on a budget of 60,000 to 70,000 rupees, saying that it was upon the insistence of a few aggrieved citizens that she decided to contest the elections.

Before Madhu, Kamla Jan was elected the first transgender mayor of India in Katni. Her candidacy was declared "void" because she contested in the female category.

== In politics ==
Madhu Kinnar wishes to work as an independent leader, as opposed to joining a political party. Her electoral victory on 4 January 2015, came about nine months after the Supreme Court NALSA verdict, which gave legal recognition to transgender people in India. In the first meeting of the Raigarh Municipal Corporation, Congress and BJP members staged a walkout, resulting in the meeting being postponed.

A crucial part of her agenda has been sanitation. In an interview with The Guardian, she states that, "“There were no proper sidewalks. The alleys were dirty and piled high with garbage. Poor people, abandoned in their old age, slept in the streets with nothing to keep them warm. We decided to do something – by running for this election.” Some of her constituents have also suggested that she take up the cleaning and filling up of lakes and ponds, as well as creating small parks and gardens. She will also be working in re-routing truck traffic to the outer roads of the city.
