= Anwen Muston =

British politician

Member of Wolverhampton City Council for East Park
- In office 5 May 2016 – 2 May 2024
- Preceded by: Payal Bedi
- Succeeded by: Stephen John

Personal details
- Party: Labour

Military service
- Allegiance: United Kingdom
- Branch/service: British Army
- Rank: Sergeant
- Unit: Staffordshire Regiment
- Battles/wars: Operation Desert Storm

Anwen Dawn Muston is a British Labour Party politician, who was elected to Wolverhampton City Council at the 2016 elections, and represents the city's East Park ward. Pink News has reported that Muston was the first openly transgender woman to be elected as a Labour representative. 2016 was her third attempt to seek elected office; she had previously stood unsuccessfully for elections in the city's Penn ward in 2014 and 2015. She was re-elected in 2021 and 2023. Muston did not run in 2024.

Muston joined the British Armed Forces at 17, and spent 25 years with the Staffordshire Regiment, where she became a rifleman, and rose to the position of sergeant. During her time with the Army she undertook a number of roles and postings, including advising on chemical warfare attacks, overseeing food rations and managing property. She also took part in the Gulf War of 1990–91, and was awarded the Kuwait Liberation Medal and Gulf War Medal. Muston left the Army in 1996.

Although Muston has stated that she "felt different from the age of eight or nine onwards", she did not begin to feel comfortable about the possibility of being a transgender woman until after leaving the Army, and did not come out publicly until 2007. Her interest in politics began after she was demobilised and, as well as serving as a councillor, she has been chair of Gender Matters, a gender-awareness and support charity based in Compton, West Midlands, as well as vice chair of LGBT Wolverhampton. She has also been an officer with LGBT Labour.

In her role with LGBT Labour, Muston attended an LGBT History Month reception at the House of Commons in February 2015, where trans women were addressed as "Sir" by members of security staff. The incident was subsequently brought to the attention of the Westminster authorities by Labour MP Kerry McCarthy, who raised the matter in the House. The staff were employed by the Metropolitan Police Service, and John Thurso, the Minister speaking on behalf of the Westminster authorities, said that the matter had been referred to the Met: "It is taking this extremely seriously and we have made it clear to the Met how seriously we take it".

Muston was selected as Labour's candidate for the East Park ward in February 2016, following the deselection of the previous incumbent, Payal Bedi.

== See also ==
- List of transgender people
