= 2016 City of Wolverhampton Council election =

2016 UK local government election

The 2016 City of Wolverhampton Council election took place on 5 May 2016 to elect members of City of Wolverhampton Council in England. 20 seats were being contested in total (one third of the Council). This was on the same day as other local elections.

The ward of Tettenhall Regis is notable for having two Conservative Party candidates nominated for a single seat. The Conservative Party confirmed that Udey Singh was the official candidate, and the additional nomination for Mark Evans, the incumbent retiring Councillor, was an 'administrative error'.

== Ward results ==
=== Bilston East ===
Bilston East 2016
Party	Candidate	Votes	%	±%
Labour	Payal Bedi-Chadha	1,094	50.18	
UKIP	Tom Fellows	791	36.28	
Conservative	David Mackintosh	295	13.53	
Majority		303	13.90	
Turnout		2,180		
Labour hold		Swing		

=== Bilston North ===
Bilston North 2016
Party	Candidate	Votes	%	±%
Labour	Linda Mary Leach	1,372	60.92	
UKIP	Ray Hollington	495	21.98	
Conservative	Peter William Dobb	385	17.10	
Majority		877	38.94	
Turnout		2,252		
Labour hold		Swing		

=== Blakenhall ===
Blakenhall 2016
Party	Candidate	Votes	%	±%
Labour	John Jeffery Rowley	1,943	59.04	
Independent	Bhajan Singh	799	24.28	
Conservative	Sera Singh Aulakh	549	16.68	
Majority		1,144	34.76	
Turnout		3,291		
Labour hold		Swing		

=== Bushbury North ===
Bushbury North 2016
Party	Candidate	Votes	%	±%
Labour	Hazel Malcolm	1,074	43.3	
Conservative	Andrew William McNeil	756	30.5	
UKIP	Gerard Fletcher	523	21.1	
Green	Michelle Webster	63	2.5	
Liberal Democrats	Ian Clive Jenkins	62	2.5	
Majority		318		
Turnout				
Labour hold		Swing		

=== Bushbury South and Low Hill ===
Bushbury South and Low Hill 2016
Party	Candidate	Votes	%	±%
Labour	Peter Alan Bilson	1,244	69	
Conservative	Simon Mark Hewitt	386	21.5	
Liberal Democrats	Ann Jenkins	172	9.5	
Majority				
Turnout				
Labour hold		Swing		

=== East Park ===
East Park 2016
Party	Candidate	Votes	%	±%
Labour	Anwen Dawn Muston	1,022	54.6	
UKIP	James Leyshon	386	21.3	
Conservative	Aaron Andrew Hall	303	16.7	
Green	Terry Hancox	50	2.8	
Independent	William of Shropshire	50	2.8	
Majority		636		
Labour hold		Swing		

=== Ettingshall ===
Ettingshall 2016
Party	Candidate	Votes	%	±%
Labour	Zee Russell	1,724	70.1	
Conservative	Adam Ansari	394	16	
Socialist Labour	Jennifer Cooper	343	13.9	
Majority		1,330		
Labour hold		Swing		

=== Fallings Park ===
Fallings Park 2016
Party	Candidate	Votes	%	±%
Labour	Ian Brookfield	1,171	53.6	
UKIP	Tracey Dawn Jukes	457	20.9	
Conservative	Giuliano Ivanov Pisarski	436	20	
Liberal Democrats	Peter Nixon	120	5.5	
Majority		714		
Labour hold		Swing		

=== Graiseley ===
Graiseley 2016
Party	Candidate	Votes	%	±%
Labour	John Charles Reynolds	1,900	70.8	
Conservative	Jas Boparai	497	18.5	
Green	David John Belcher	168	6.3	
Liberal Democrats	Kieran Patrick Smith	120	4.5	
Majority		1,403		
Labour hold		Swing		

=== Heath Town ===
Heath Town 2016
Party	Candidate	Votes	%	±%
Labour	Jasbir Kaur Jaspal	1,097	57.4	
Conservative	Fortune Sibanda	471	24.7	
TUSC	Jarrad Williams	177	9.3	
Liberal Democrats	Alan William Bamber	165	8.6	
Majority		626		
Labour hold		Swing		

=== Merry Hill ===
Merry Hill 2016
Party	Candidate	Votes	%	±%
Labour	Alan David Bolshaw	1,352	44.2	
Conservative	Carl James Husted	1,338	43.8	
Green	Henry Obi	208	6.8	
Liberal Democrats	Jessica Rose Pringle	158	5.2	
Majority		14		
Labour hold		Swing		

=== Oxley ===
Oxley 2016
Party	Candidate	Votes	%	±%
Labour	Louise Margaret Miles	1,384	59	
Conservative	Neil David Turner	718	30.6	
Liberal Democrats	Robert Edward Quarmby	245	10.4	
Majority		666		
Labour hold		Swing		

=== Park ===
Park 2016
Party	Candidate	Votes	%	±%
Labour	Claire Darke	1,511	58.4	
Conservative	Kamran Khan	684	26.5	
Green	Andrea Cantrill	228	8.8	
Liberal Democrats	Bryan Hamer Lewis	163	6.3	
Majority		827		
Labour hold		Swing		

=== Penn ===
Penn 2016
Party	Candidate	Votes	%	±%
Labour	Martin Wintour Waite	1,729	45.70	
Conservative	Simon Bennett	1,461	38.62	
UKIP	Barry Hodgson	423	11.18	
Liberal Democrats	Jeffrey William Hemsley	170	4.49	
Majority		268	7.08	
Turnout		3,783		
Labour hold		Swing		

=== Spring Vale ===
Spring Vale 2016
Party	Candidate	Votes	%	±%
Labour	Mak Singh	1,048	41.5	
UKIP	Hazel Thomas	829	32.8	
Liberal Democrats	Sarah Rheannon May Quarmby	426	16.9	
Conservative	Savita Sehdev	222	8.8	
Majority		819		
Labour gain from Liberal Democrats		Swing		

=== St Peter’s ===
St Peter’s 2016
Party	Candidate	Votes	%	±%
Labour	Roger Charles Lawrence	1,150	56.6	
Conservative	Sohail Khan	709	34.9	
Green	Rachel Arnold	173	8.5	
Majority		443		
Labour hold		Swing		

=== Tettenhall Regis ===
Tettenhall Regis 2016
Party	Candidate	Votes	%	±%
Conservative	Udey Singh	1,045	34.56	
Labour	Chester Morrison	970	32.08	
UKIP	Doug Hope	454	15.01	
Conservative	Mark Evans	415	13.72	
Liberal Democrats	Peter Hollis	140	4.63	
Majority		75	2.48	
Turnout		3,024		
Conservative hold		Swing		

=== Tettenhall Wightwick ===
Tettenhall Wightwick 2016
Party	Candidate	Votes	%	±%
Conservative	Arun Photay	1,938	59.9	
Labour	Phil Walker	905	28	
Liberal Democrats	Frances Kathleen Heap	208	6.4	
Green	John Pit	184	5.7	
Majority		1,033		
Conservative hold		Swing		

=== Wednesfield North ===
Wednesfield North 2016
Party	Candidate	Votes	%	±%
Labour	Philip Thomas Alexander Bateman MBE	1,615	65.8	
Conservative	Andrew Scott Randle	641	26.1	
Green	Lee Harris	200	8.1	
Majority		974		
Labour hold		Swing		

=== Wednesfield South ===
Wednesfield South 2016
Party	Candidate	Votes	%	±%
Labour	Paula Christine Brookfield	1,540	62.4	
Conservative	Steve Hall	928	37.6	
Majority		612		
Labour hold		Swing		
