= Sophie Rebecca =

English transgender ballet dancer

- Born: 1980 or 1981
- Education: Royal Academy of Dance
- Occupation: Ballet dancer

Sophie Rebecca (born 1980 or 1981) is an English ballet dancer who was the first openly transgender person to train on the Royal Academy of Dance's courses for female dancers. The academy policies were changed in 2013, and no longer require that students taking these courses must have been born female.

== Early life ==
Rebecca was inspired to become a dancer while watching Blue Peter at the age of four or five, where she saw dancers performing as the sweets in The Nutcracker.

Her father passed away when she was young. Upon coming out privately in the 1990s, her mother was supportive of her gender identity.

== Dance ==
Rebecca first began learning to dance at the age of 17, when she learned the traditional male dance roles. However, she was expelled when the instructor learned of her gender identity.

Rebecca first began taking female ballet courses at the Royal Academy of Dance in 2013, when the academy changed its previous policy that only women assigned female at birth could take the courses. Though she did not have plans to make a career out of ballet, she trained for her 'intermediate foundation' qualification, a ballet skill certification.
