= Marvia Malik =

Pakistani journalist and newscaster

- Born: 1997 (age 28–29); Lahore, Pakistan
- Occupation: News anchor

Marvia Malik is a Pakistani transgender newsreader and media figure. She became the first openly transgender newsreader to appear on Pakistani television when she made her debut in 2018.

== Early life ==
Malik was born in Lahore in 1997 to a family of three siblings. As a child, she was bullied by her classmates in school but she managed to complete her matriculation. She became estranged from her family later in life. After leaving home, she took refuge with other trans women. She was determined to become a lawyer or a journalist her whole life.

== Professional life and activism ==
She worked as a makeup artist in order to fund her higher studies, before pursuing a career in mass media, graduating with a degree in the latter from Punjab University.

She then applied for a position at Kohenoor News. Regarding the breakthrough with her becoming a news anchor, Marvia has stated that, "Our society treats transgender people shamefully, degrading them, denying them jobs, laughing at them and taunting them. I want to change that."

She has previously modelled as well. She has walked the runway for the Pakistan Fashion Design Council fashion week in Lahore, a job she got through students at the Lahore Grammar School.

In March 2018, Malik became the first openly transgender person to fill the role of newsreader on a Pakistani news broadcast. This occurrence attracted media attention. She is working with Kohenoor News "Azad Bhi Zimydar Bhi" the news channel helped her to grow in the field of journalism.

She is planning to advocate property rights for trans persons in Pakistan. She is also demanding reservation for trans persons in employment and in Parliament. She does not consider herself to be "third gender".

In February 2023, Malik was returning home from the pharmacy when two gunmen opened fire on her. Malik reportedly survived the attack, and stated to Dawn that the attack had been preceded by threatening phone calls regarding her transgender advocacy.

== See also ==
- Rimal Ali
