= List of LGBTQ sportspeople =

This is a list of notable, openly lesbian, gay, bisexual, pansexual, and transgender sportspeople as well as those who identify as belonging to the broader queer community.

== List ==
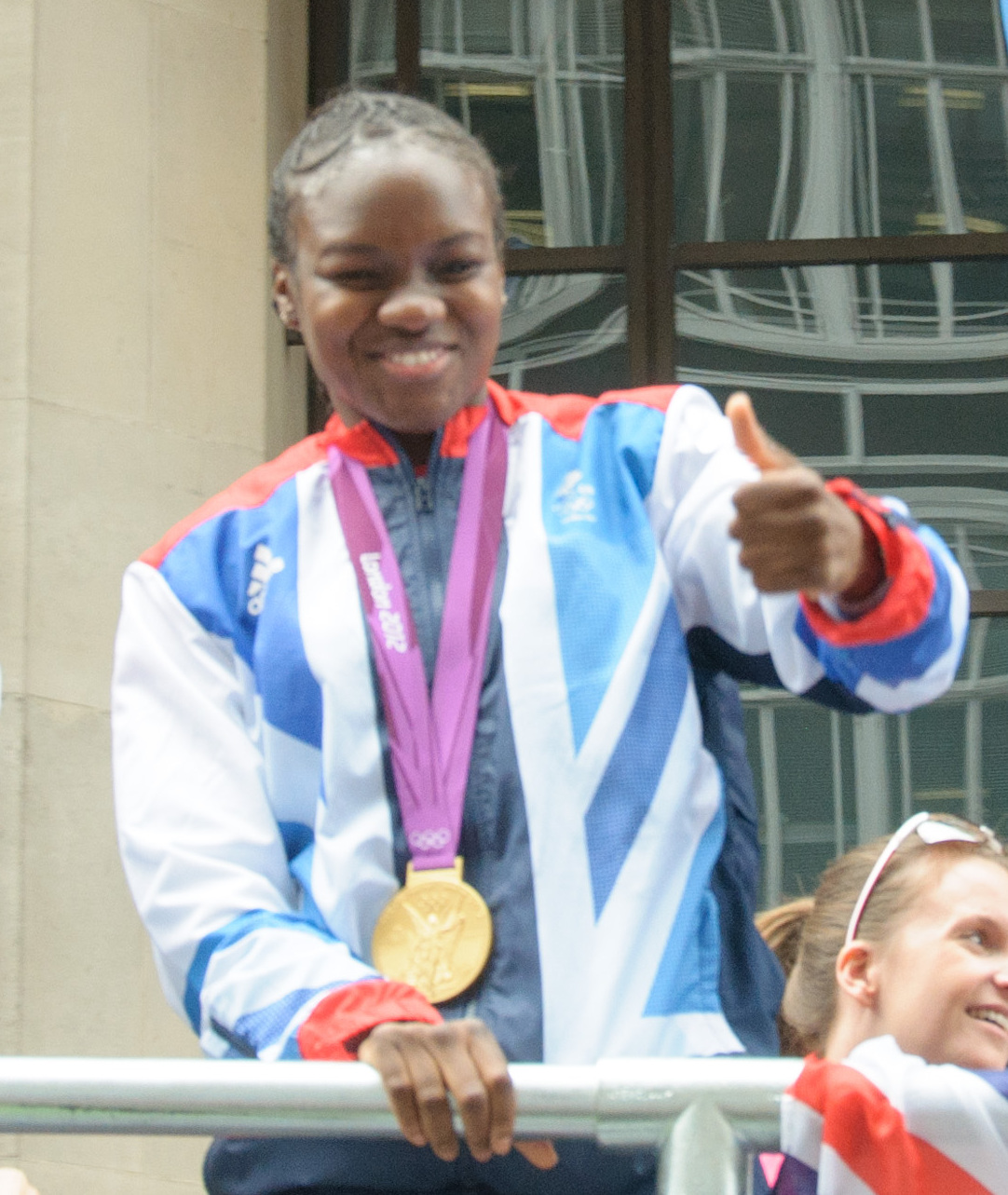
Boxer – Nicola Adams

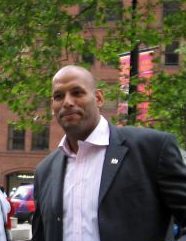
Basketball player – John Amaechi

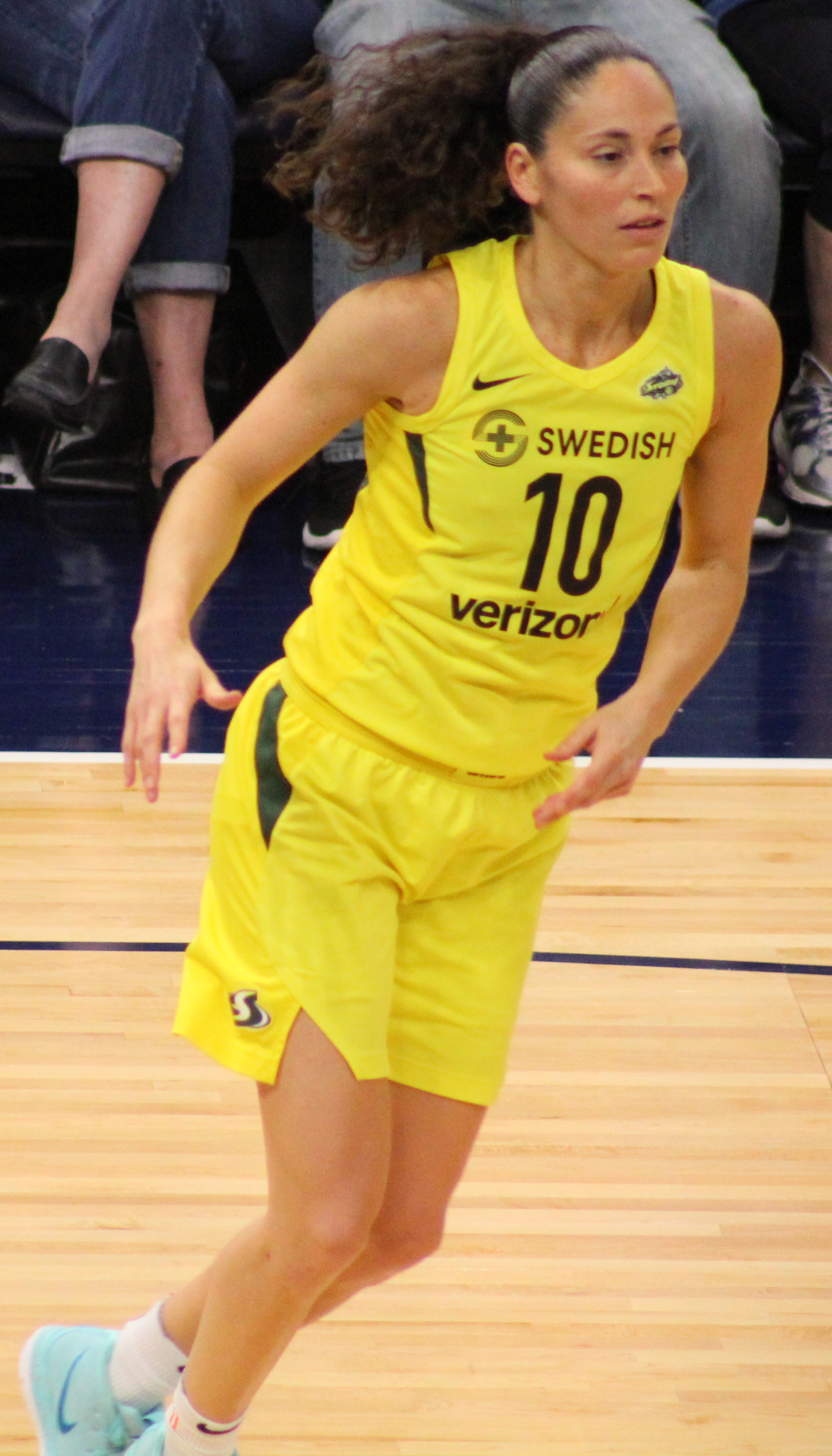
Basketball player – Sue Bird

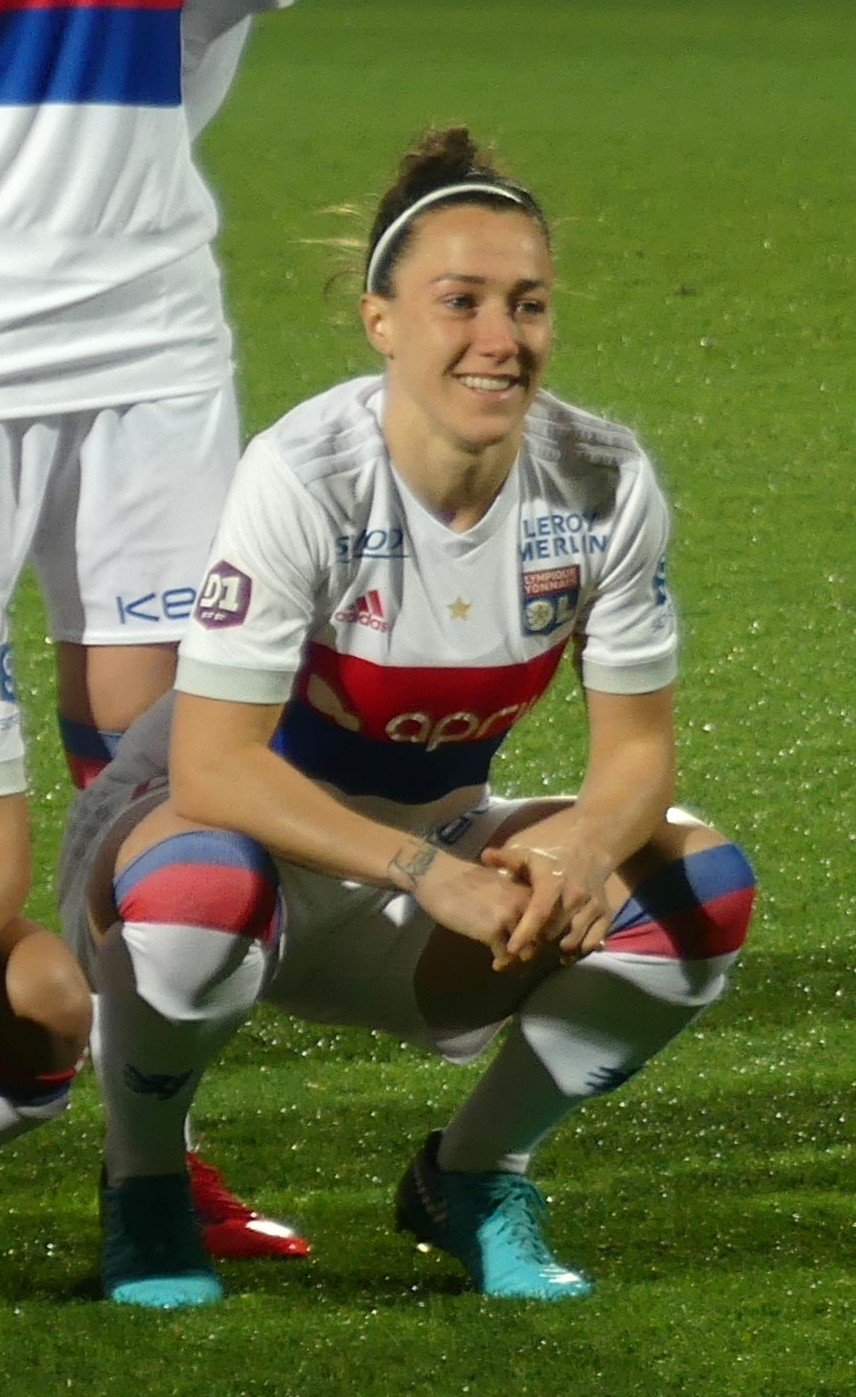
Footballer – Lucy Bronze

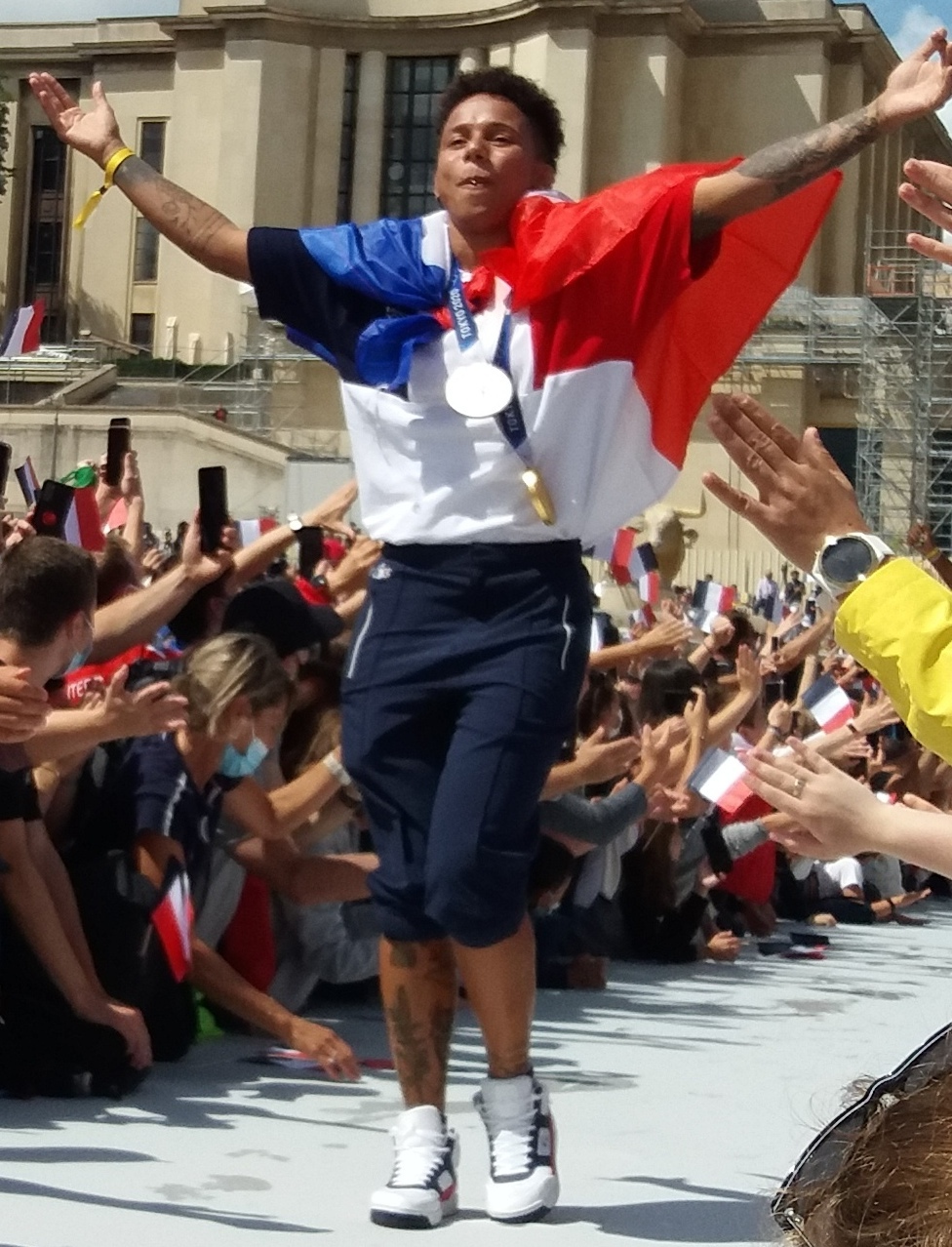
Judoka – Amandine Buchard

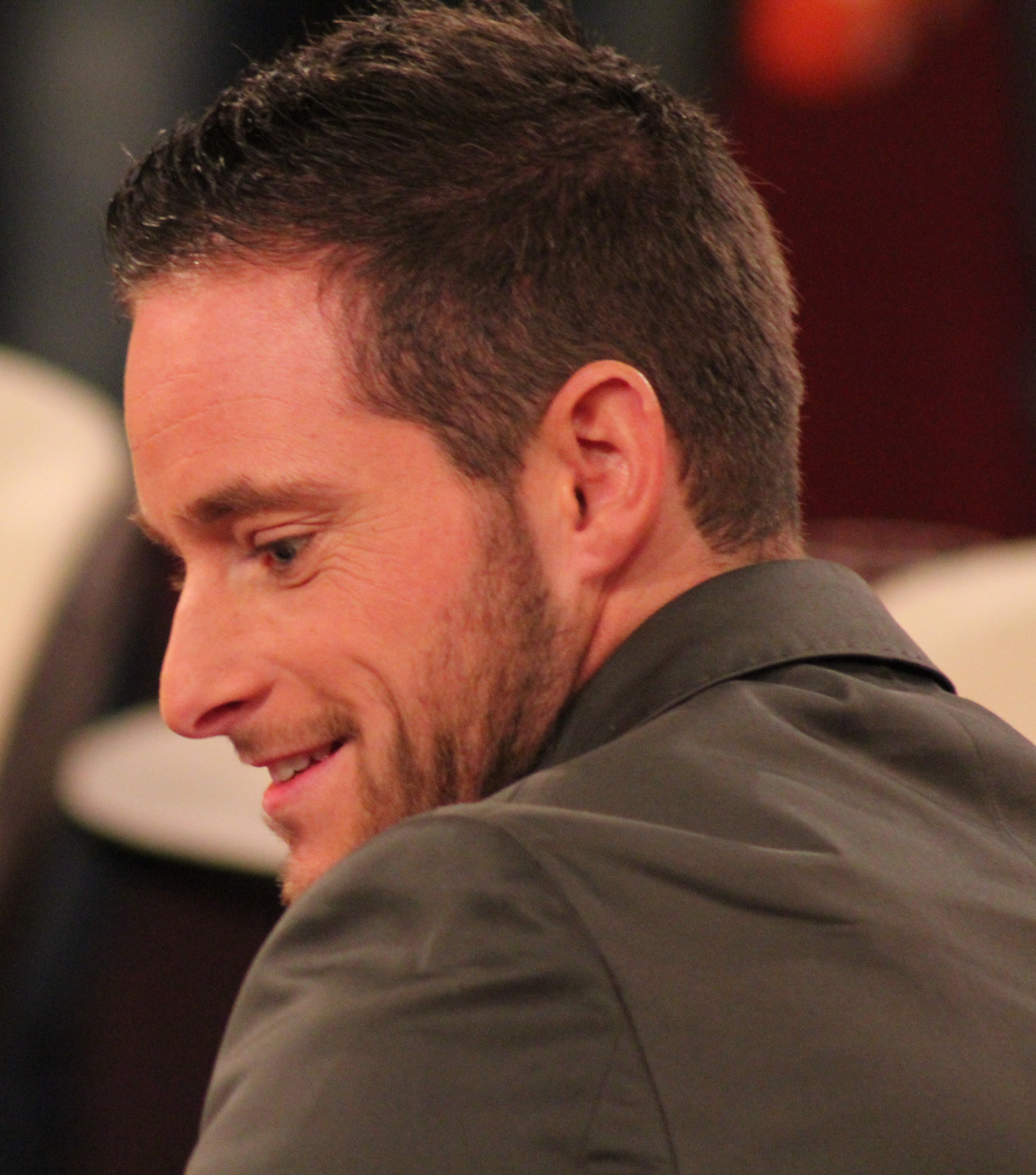
Pole Vaulter – Balian Buschbaum

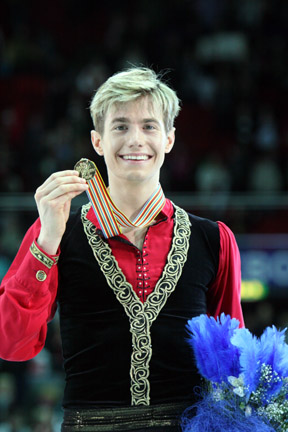
Figure skater – Jeffrey Buttle

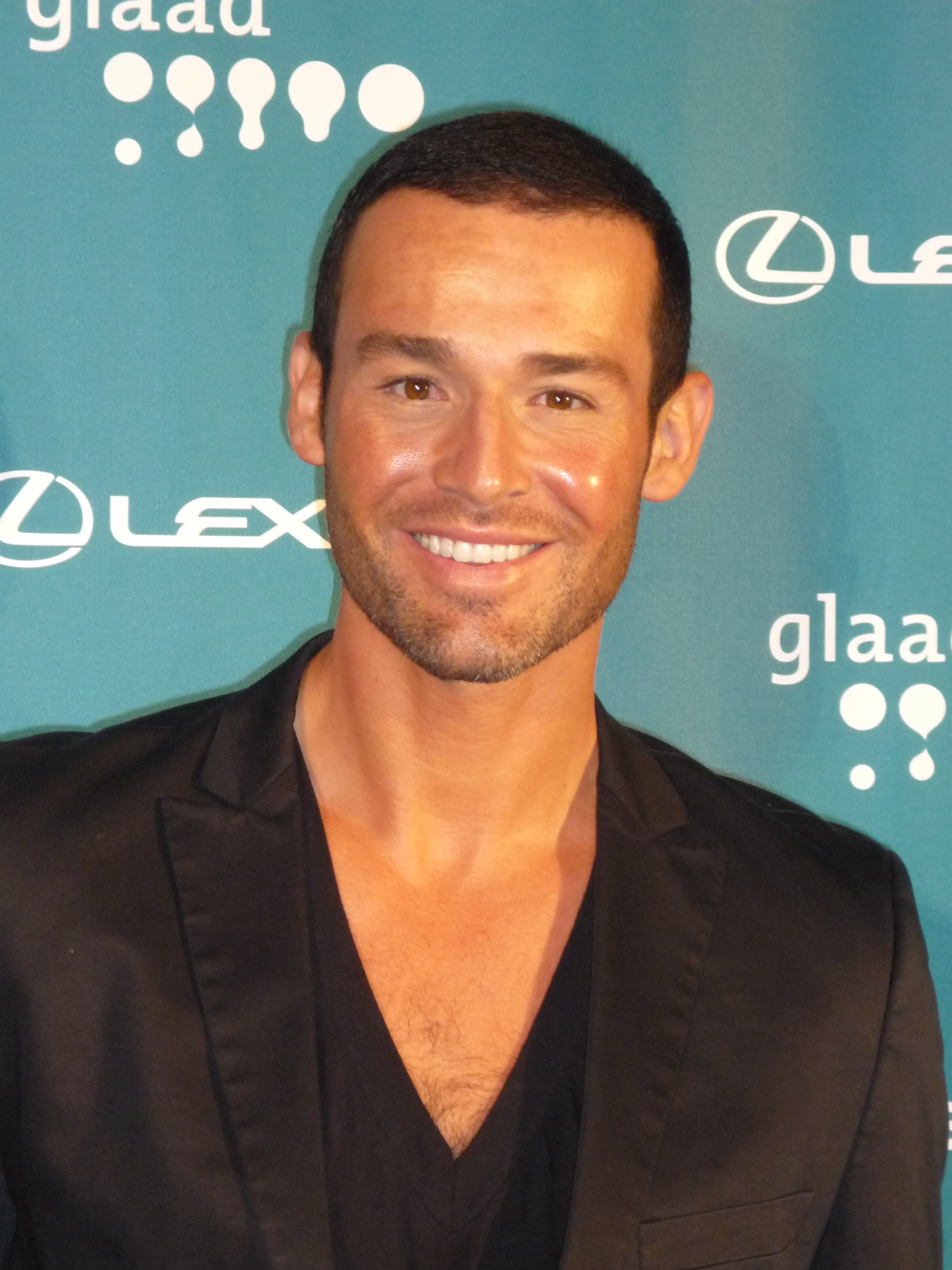
Volleyball player – J. P. Calderon

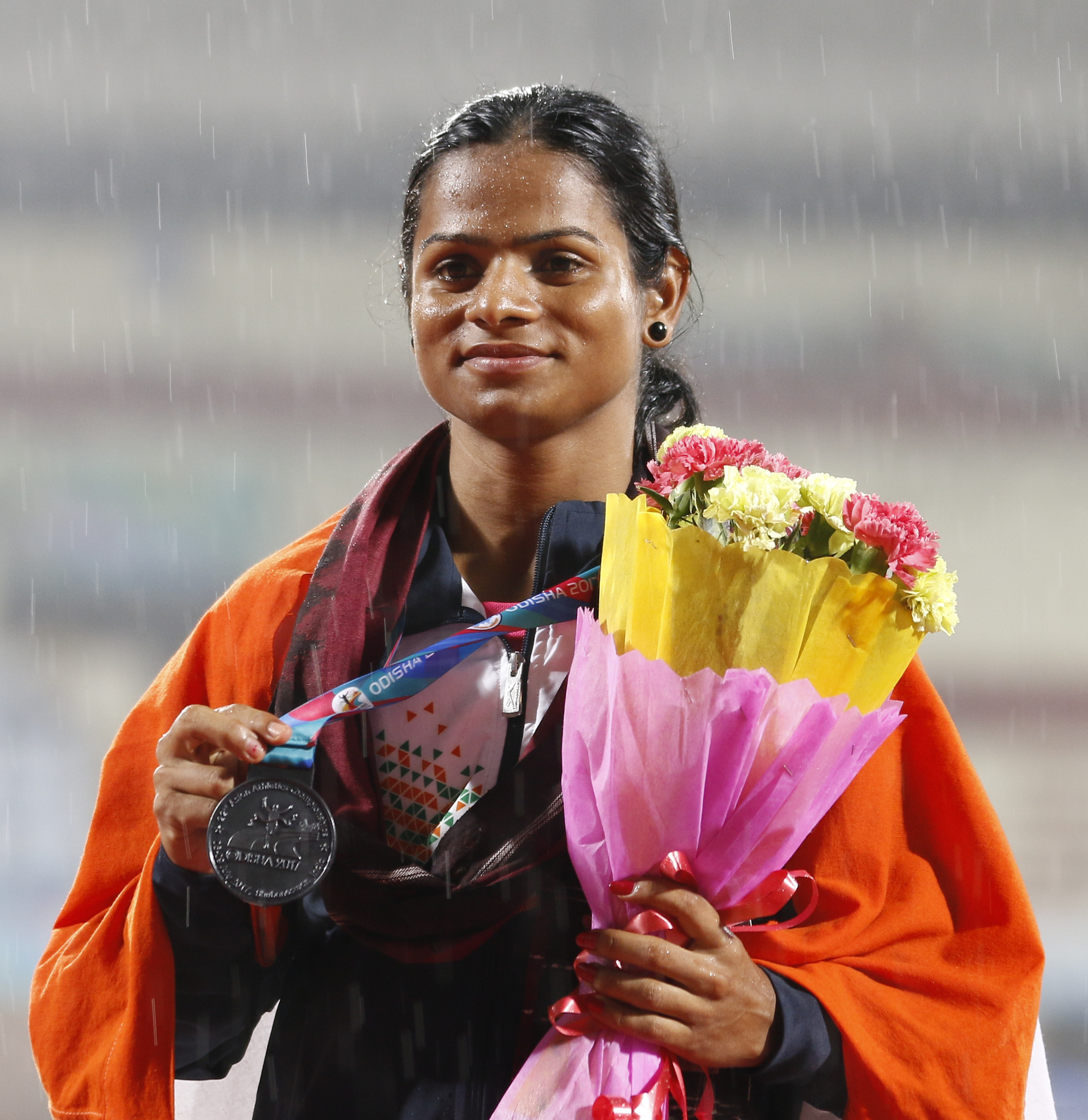
Sprinter – Dutee Chand

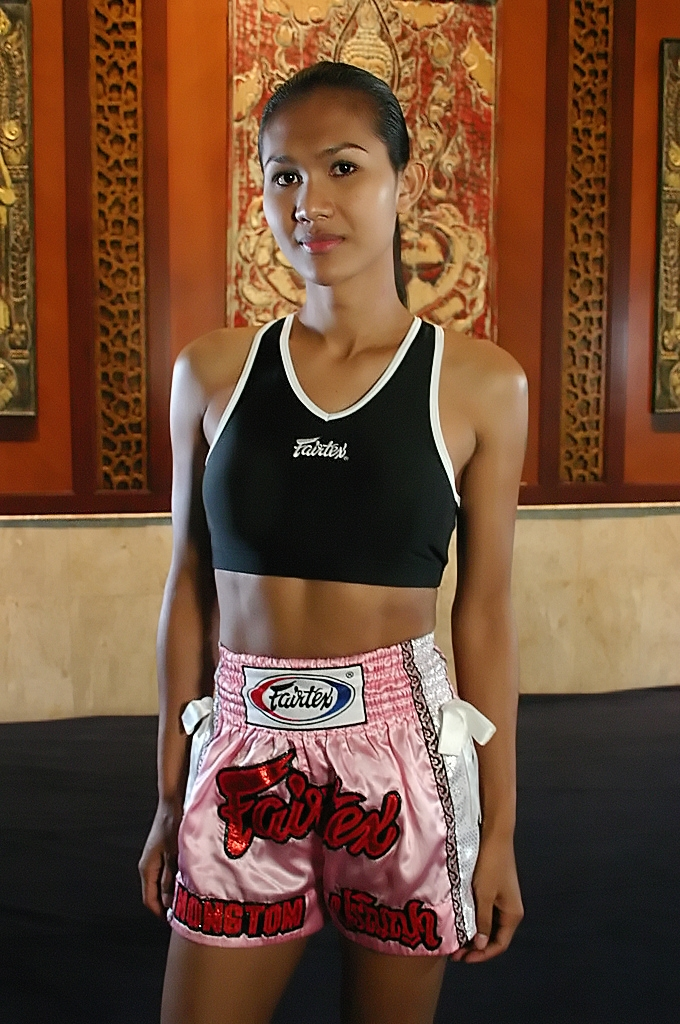
Boxer – Parinya Charoenphol

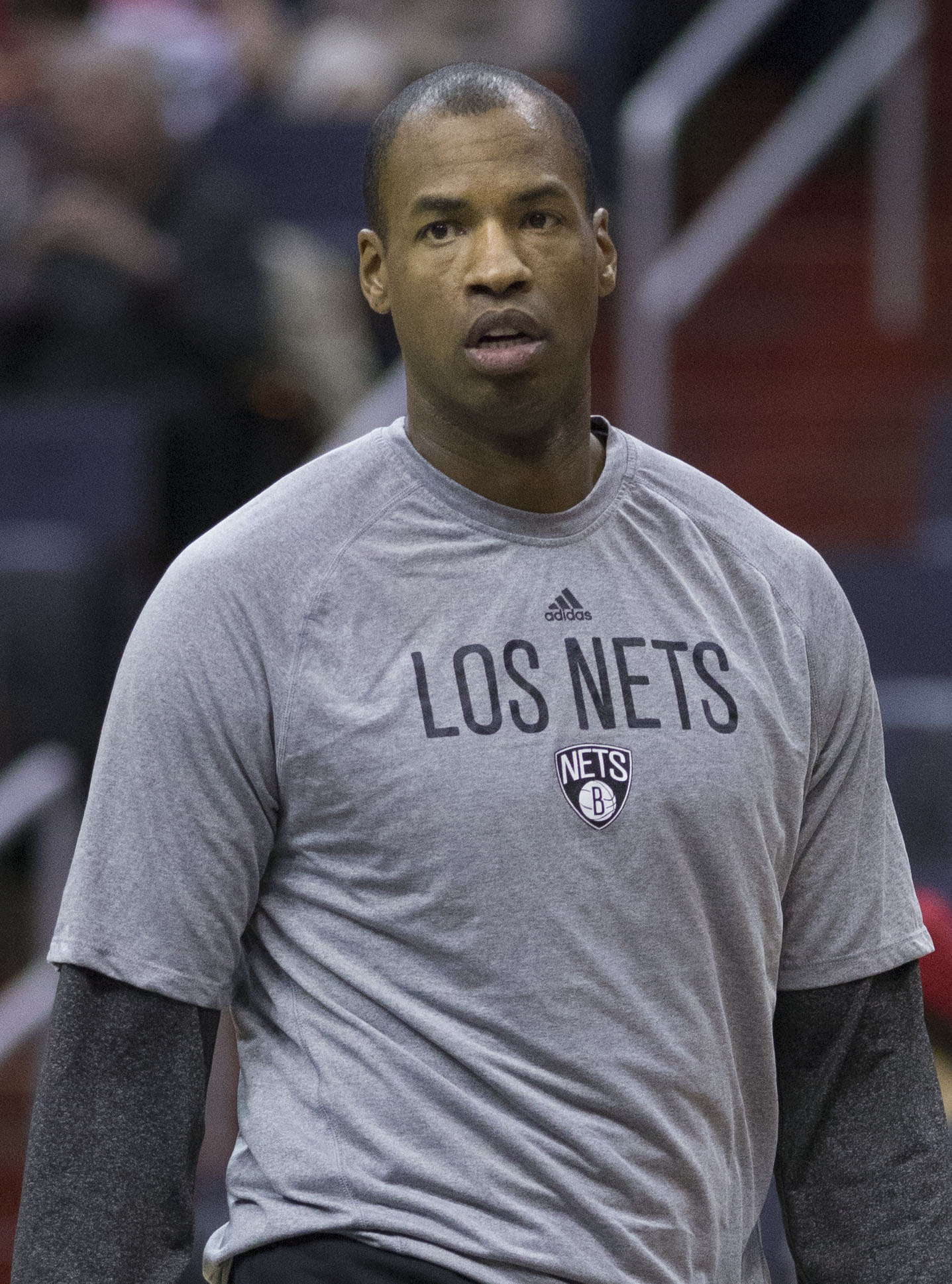
Basketball player – Jason Collins

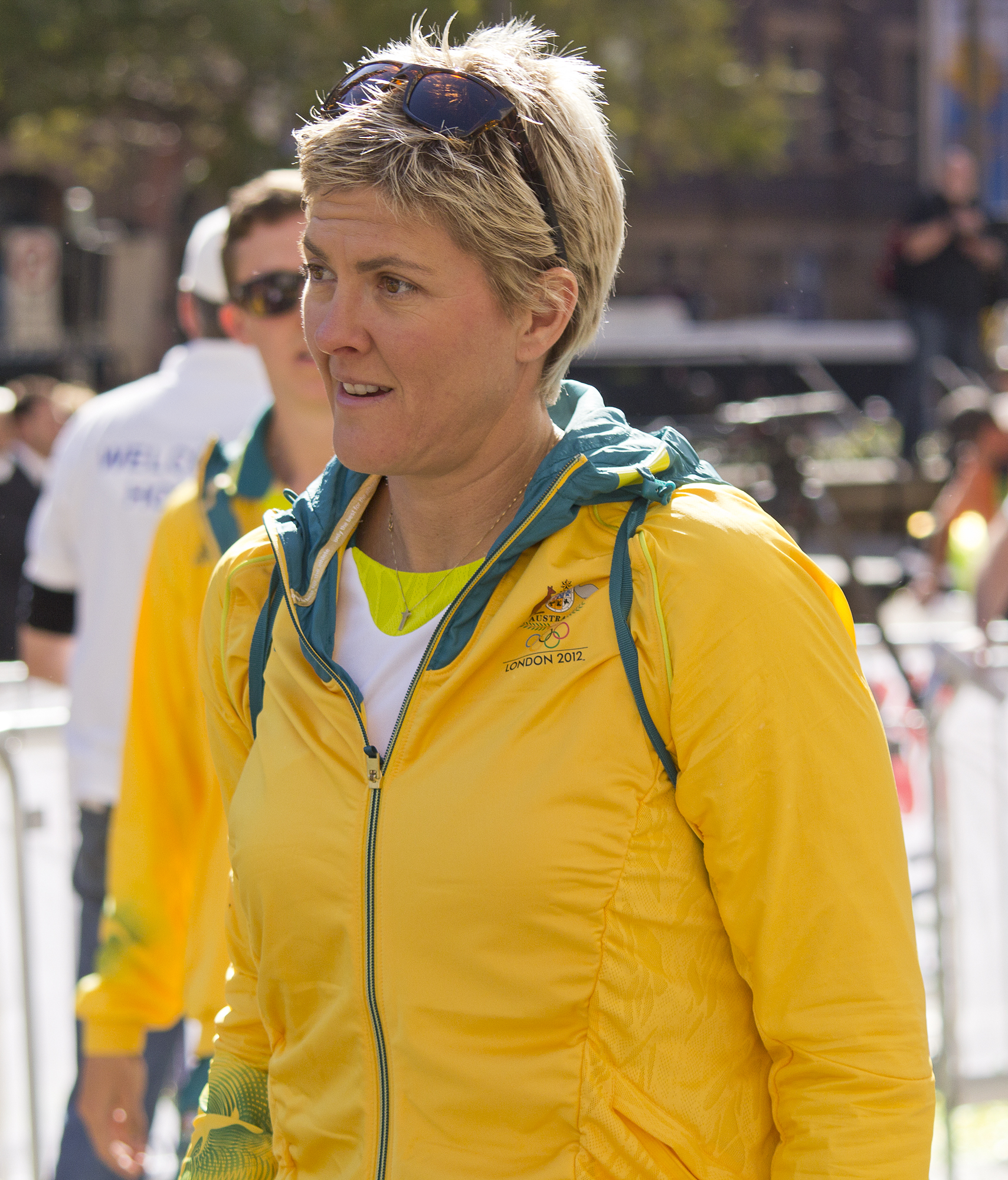
Beach volleyball player – Natalie Cook

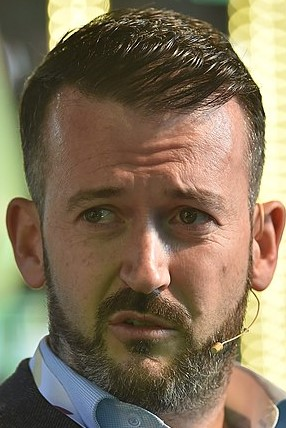
Hurler – Dónal Óg Cusack

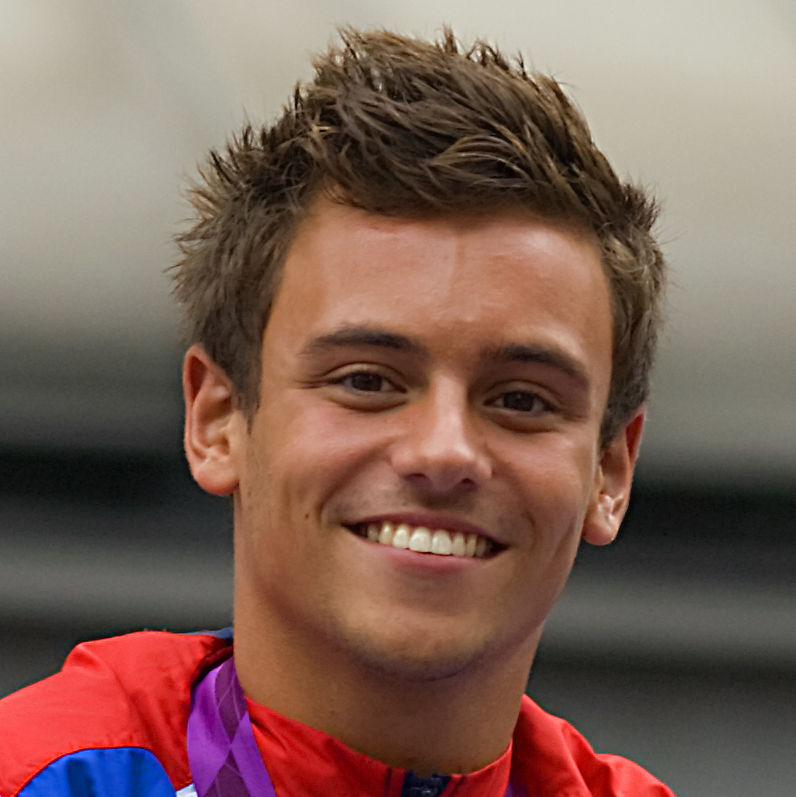
Diver – Tom Daley

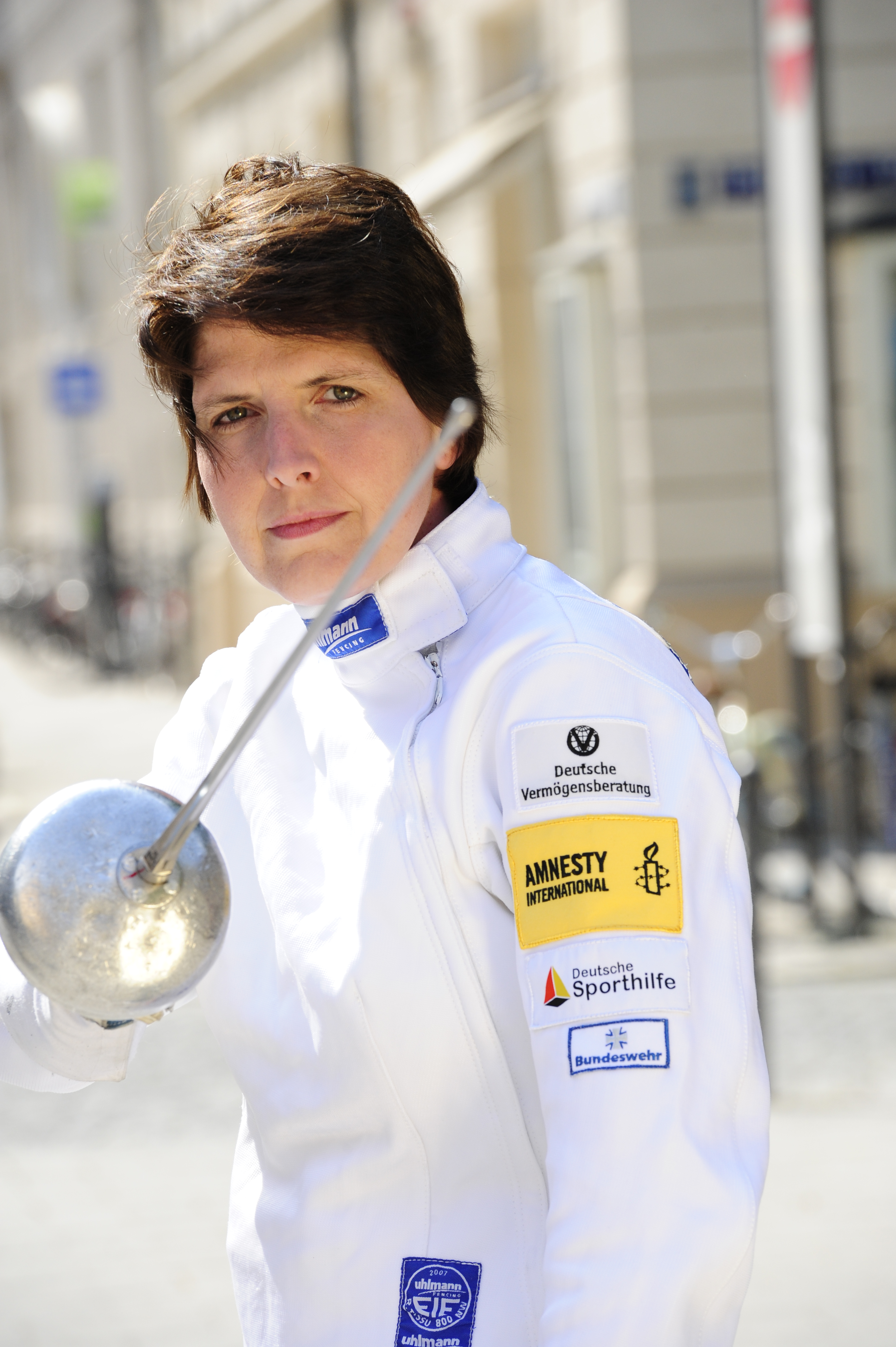
Fencer – Imke Duplitzer

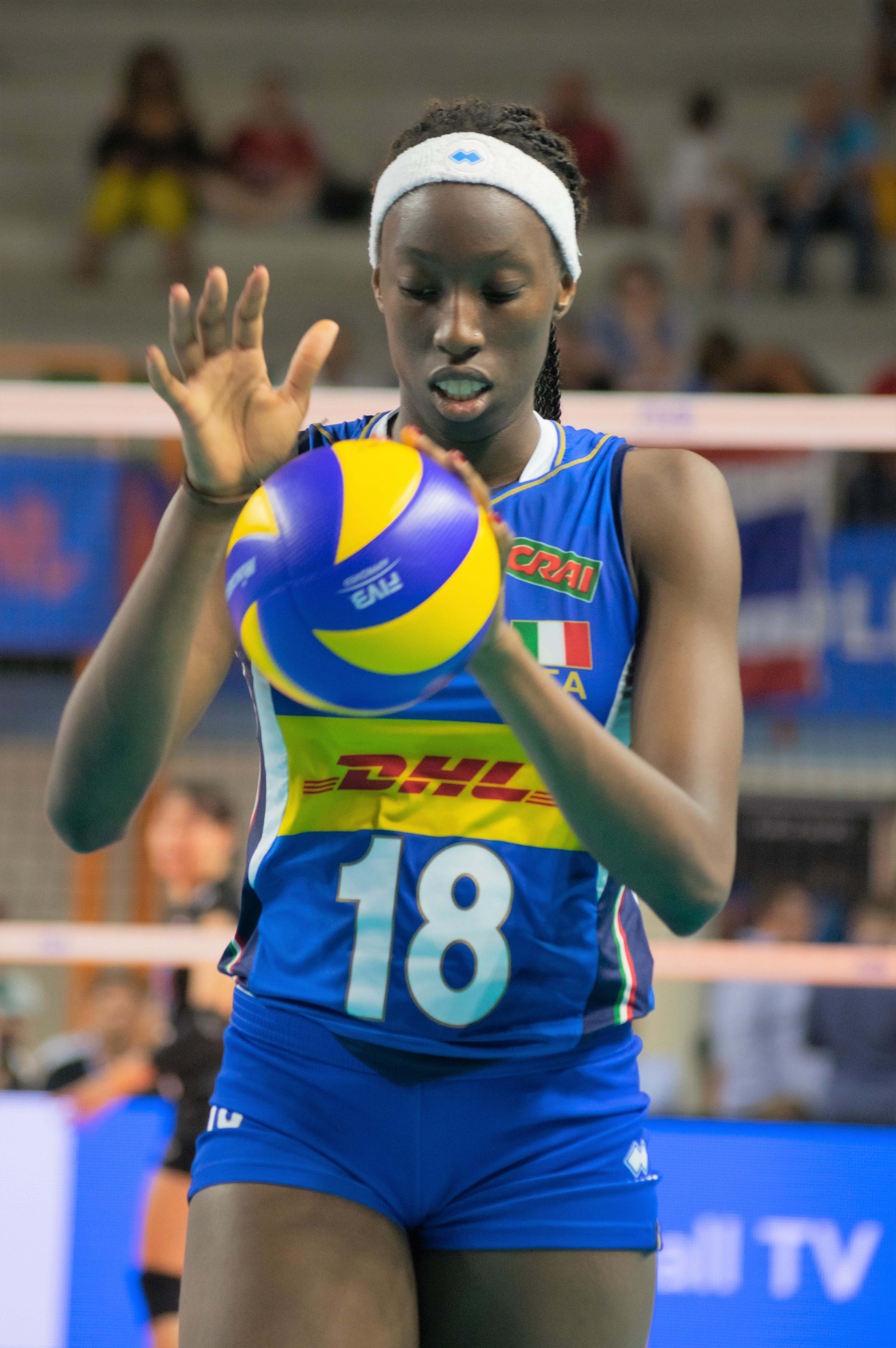
Volleyball player – Paola Egonu

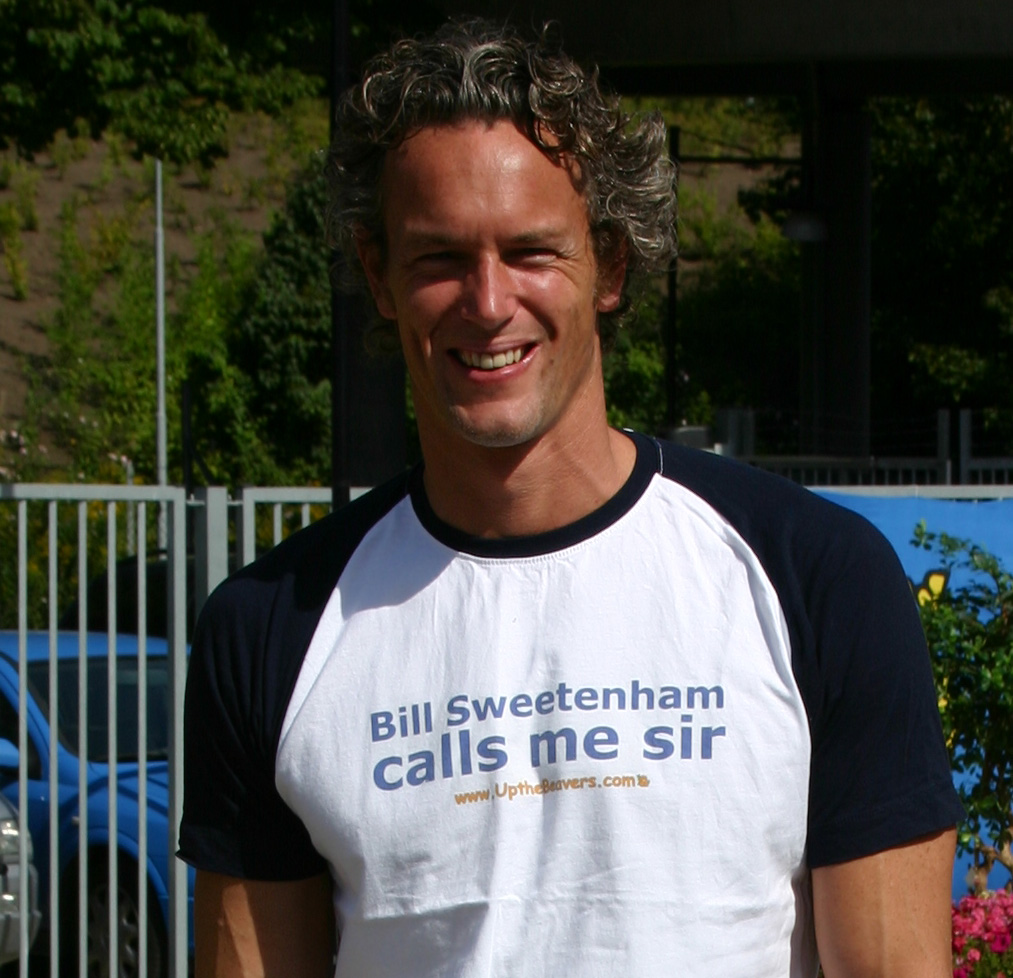
Swimmer – Mark Foster

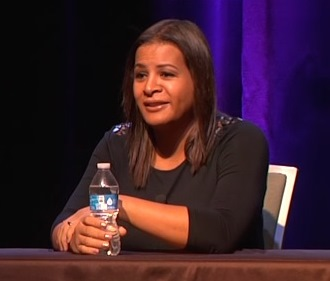
Mixed martial artist – Fallon Fox

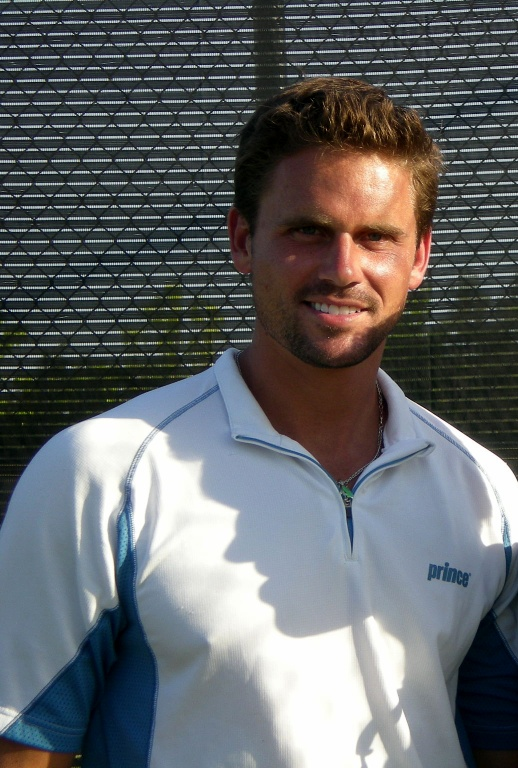
Tennis player – Jan-Michael Gambill

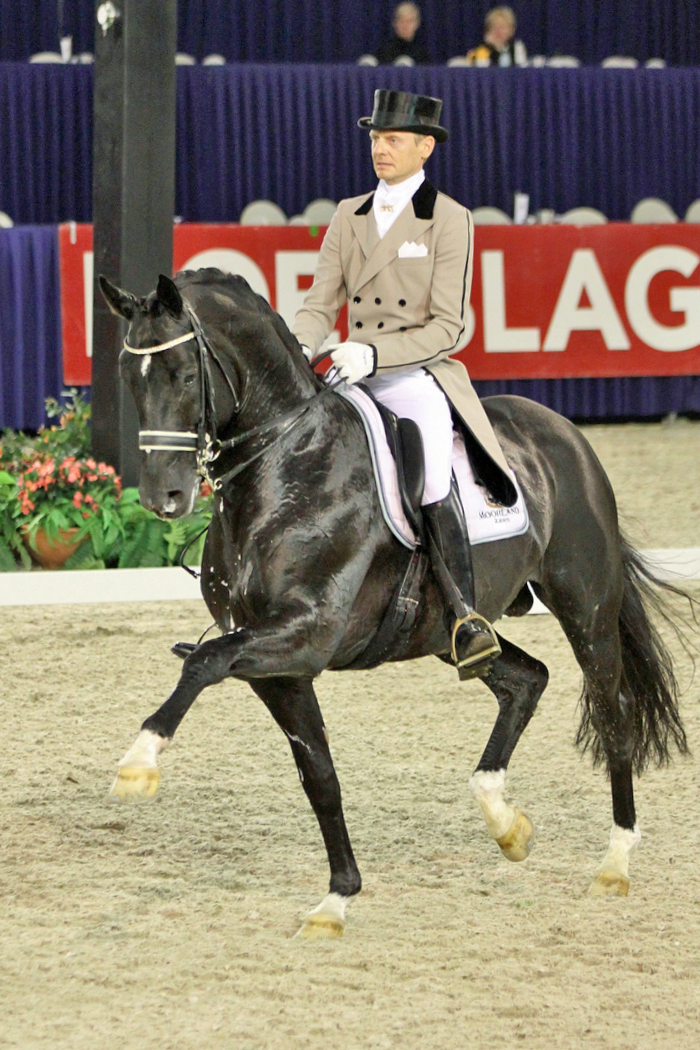
Equestrian – Edward Gal

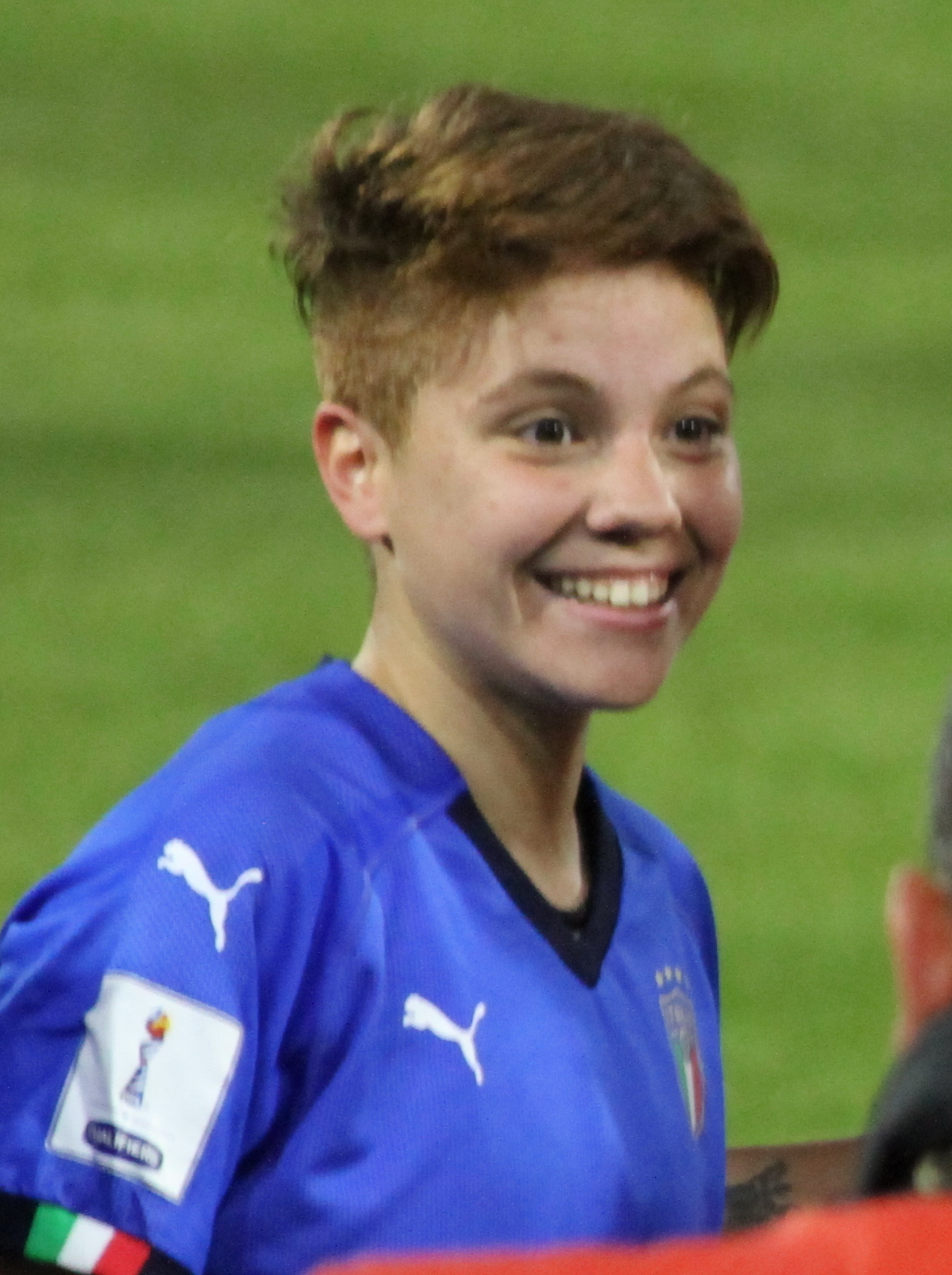
Footballer – Manuela Giugliano

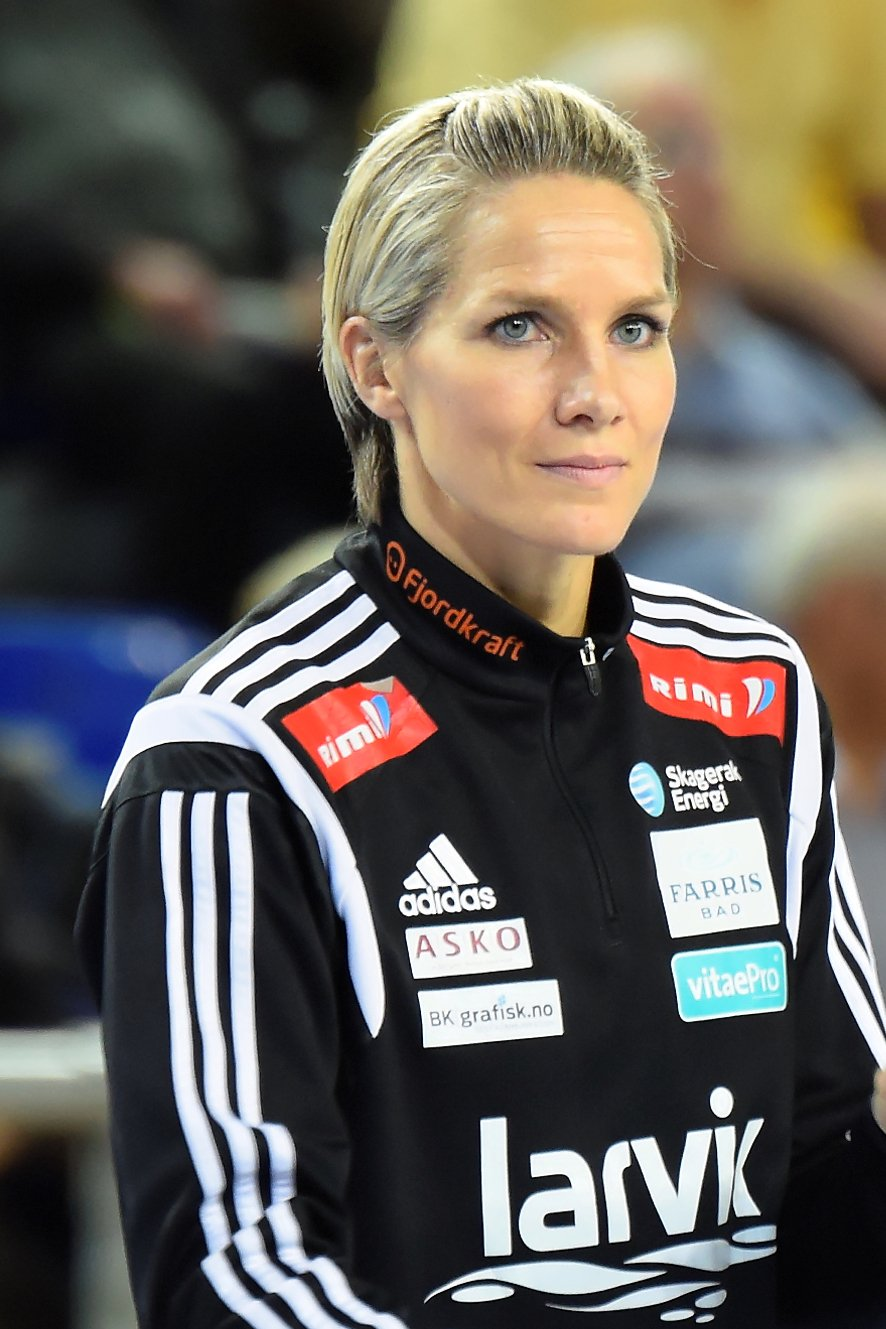
Handballer – Gro Hammerseng

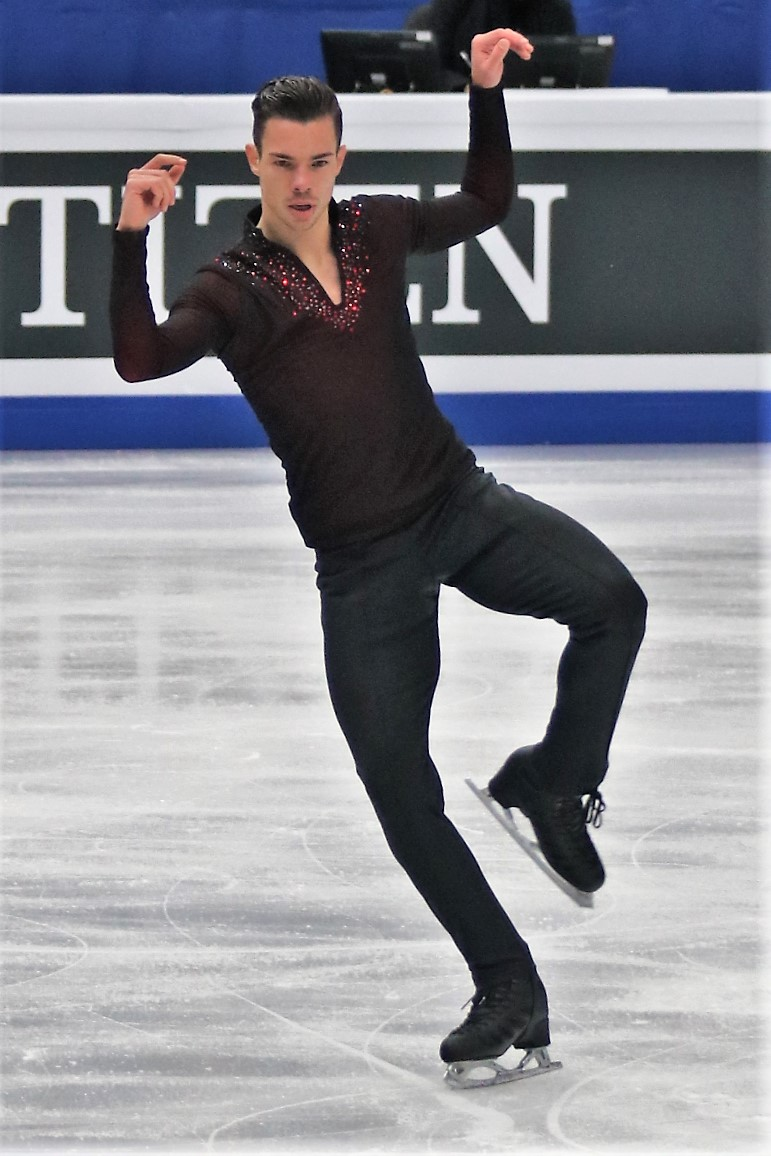
Figure skater – Jorik Hendrickx

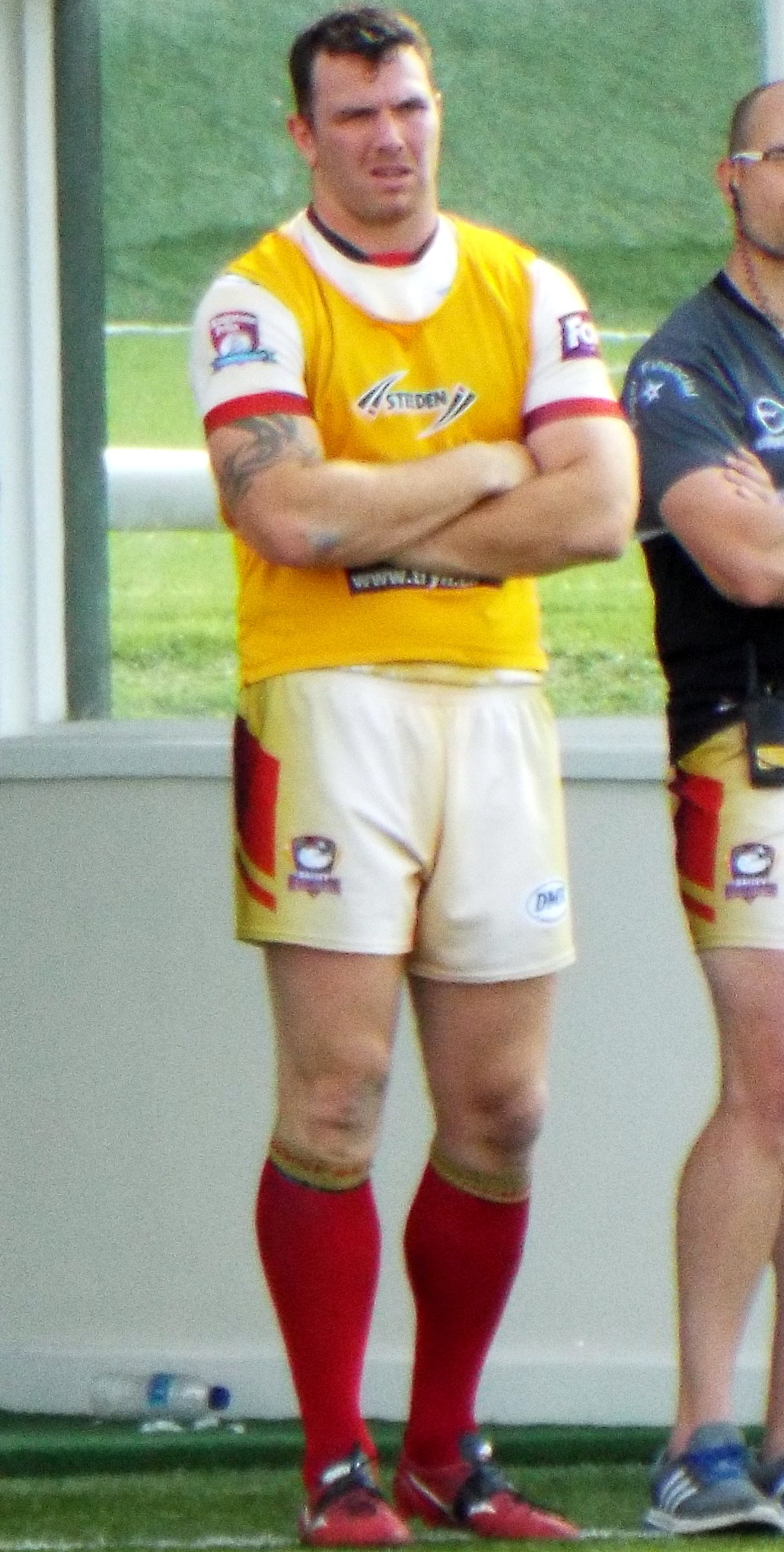
Rugby league player – Keegan Hirst

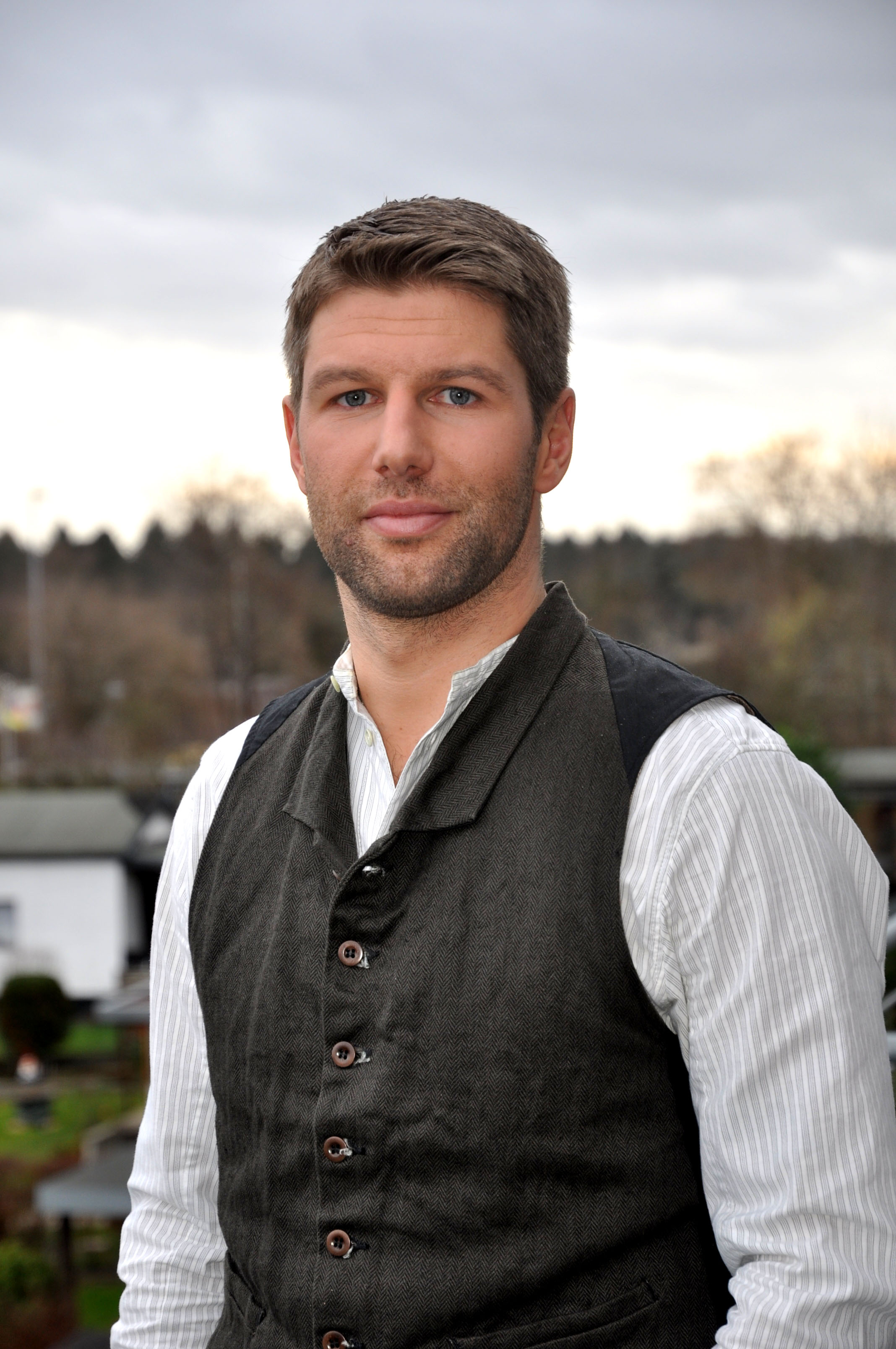
Footballer – Thomas Hitzlsperger

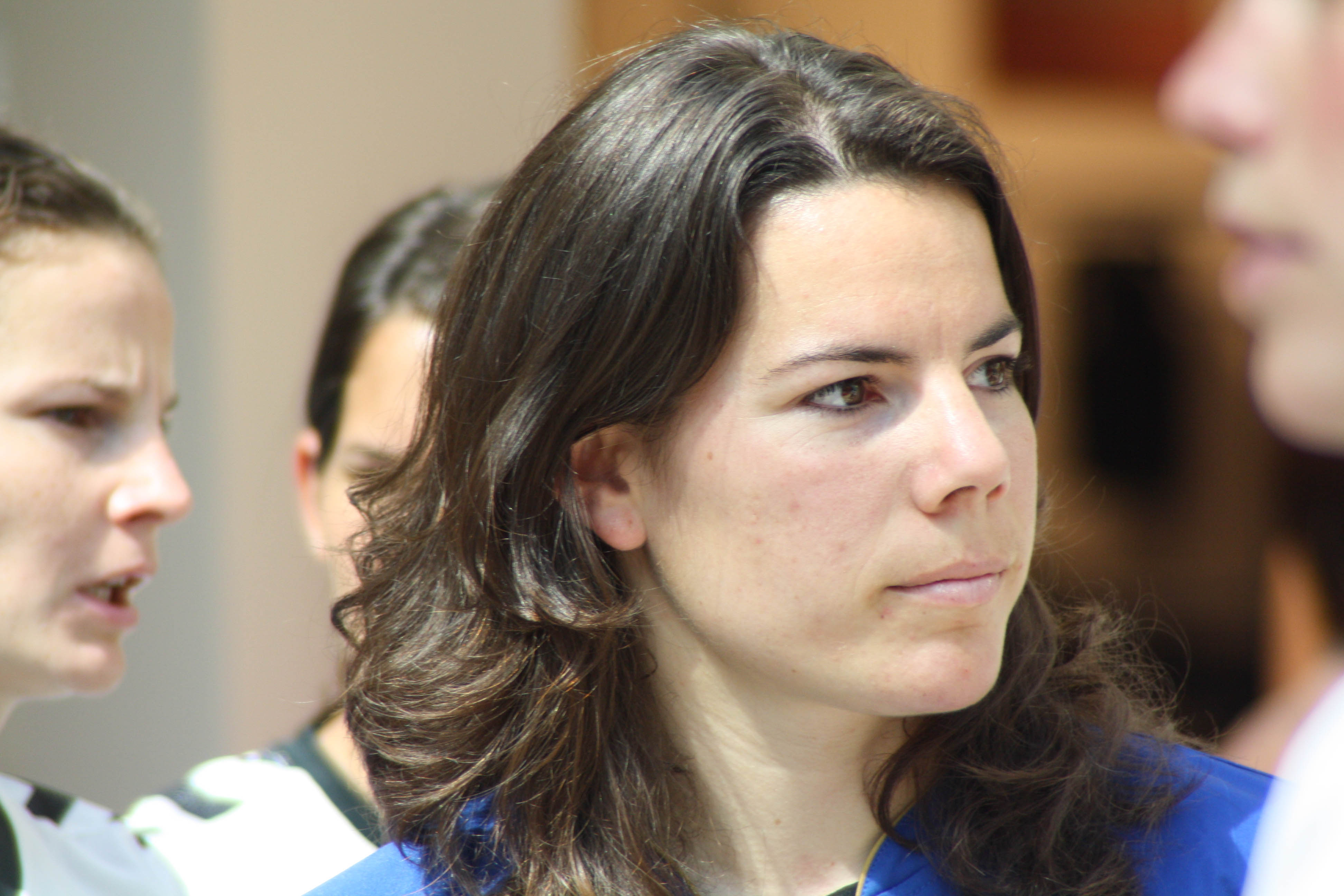
Footballer – Ursula Holl

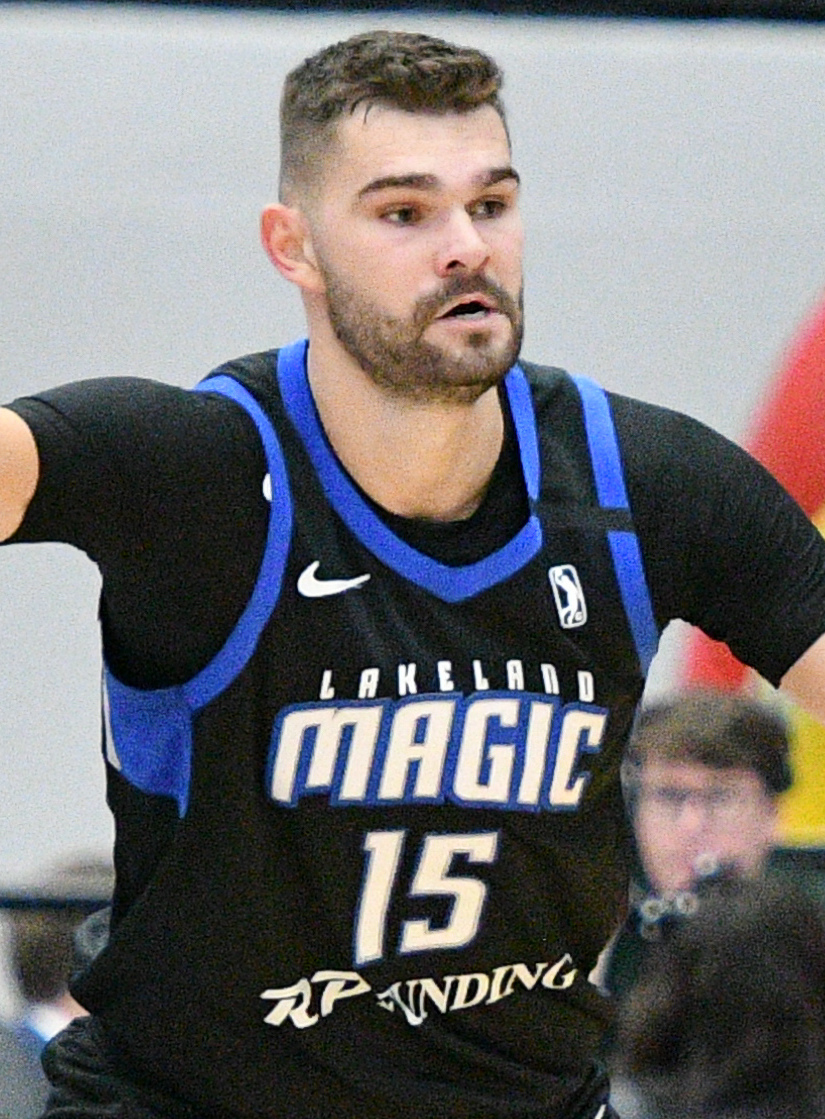
Basketball player – Isaac Humphries

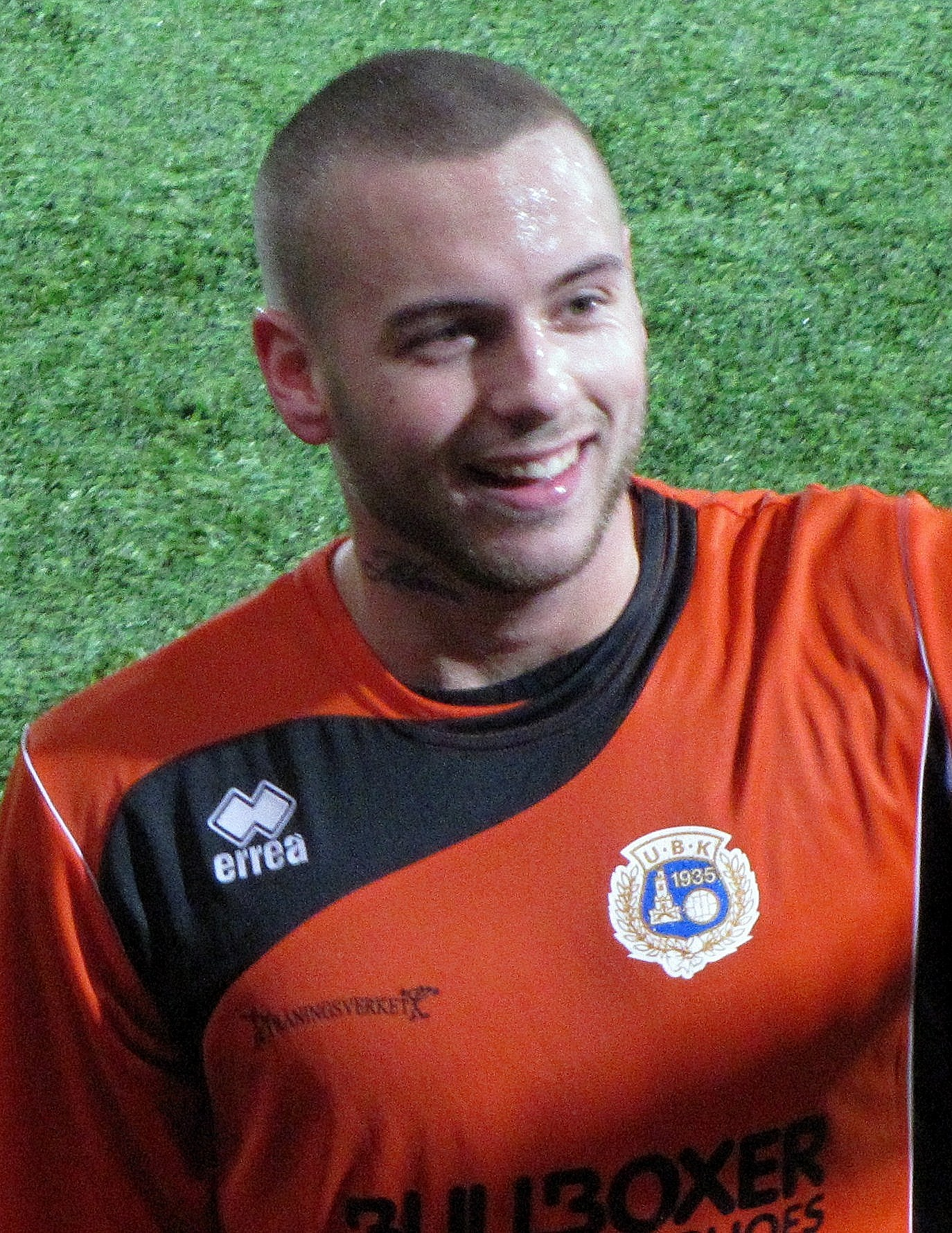
Football player – Antonio Hysén

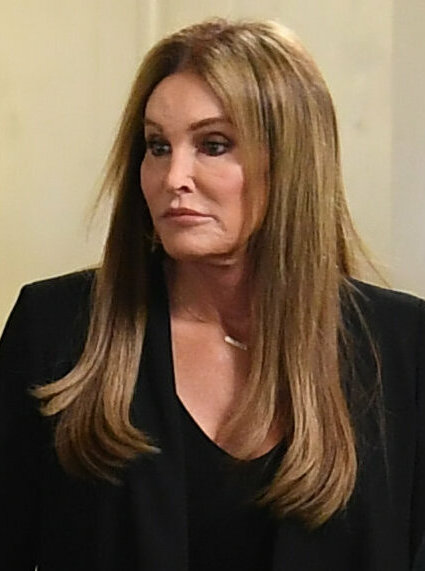
Decathlete – Caitlyn Jenner

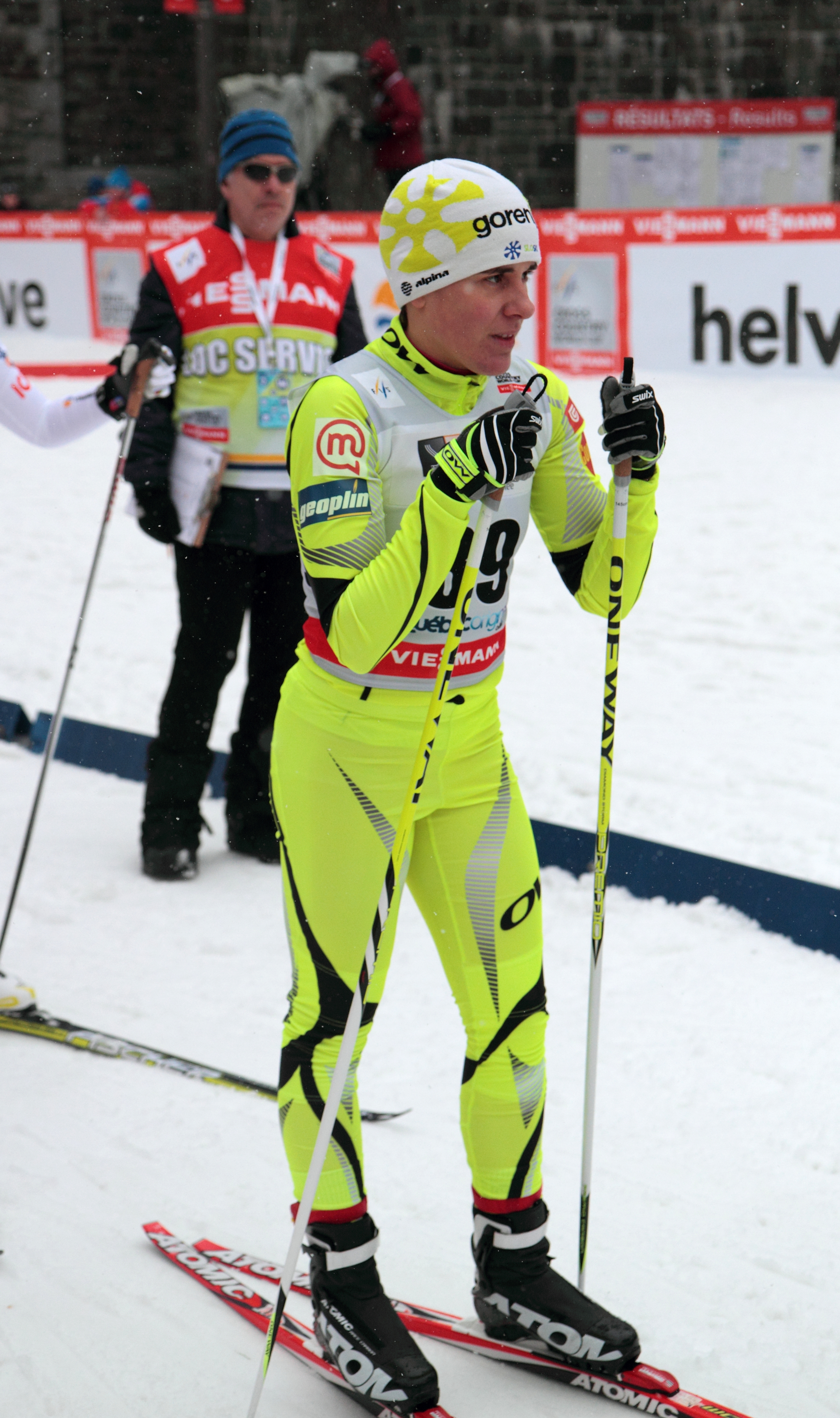
Cross's-country skier – Barbara Jezeršek

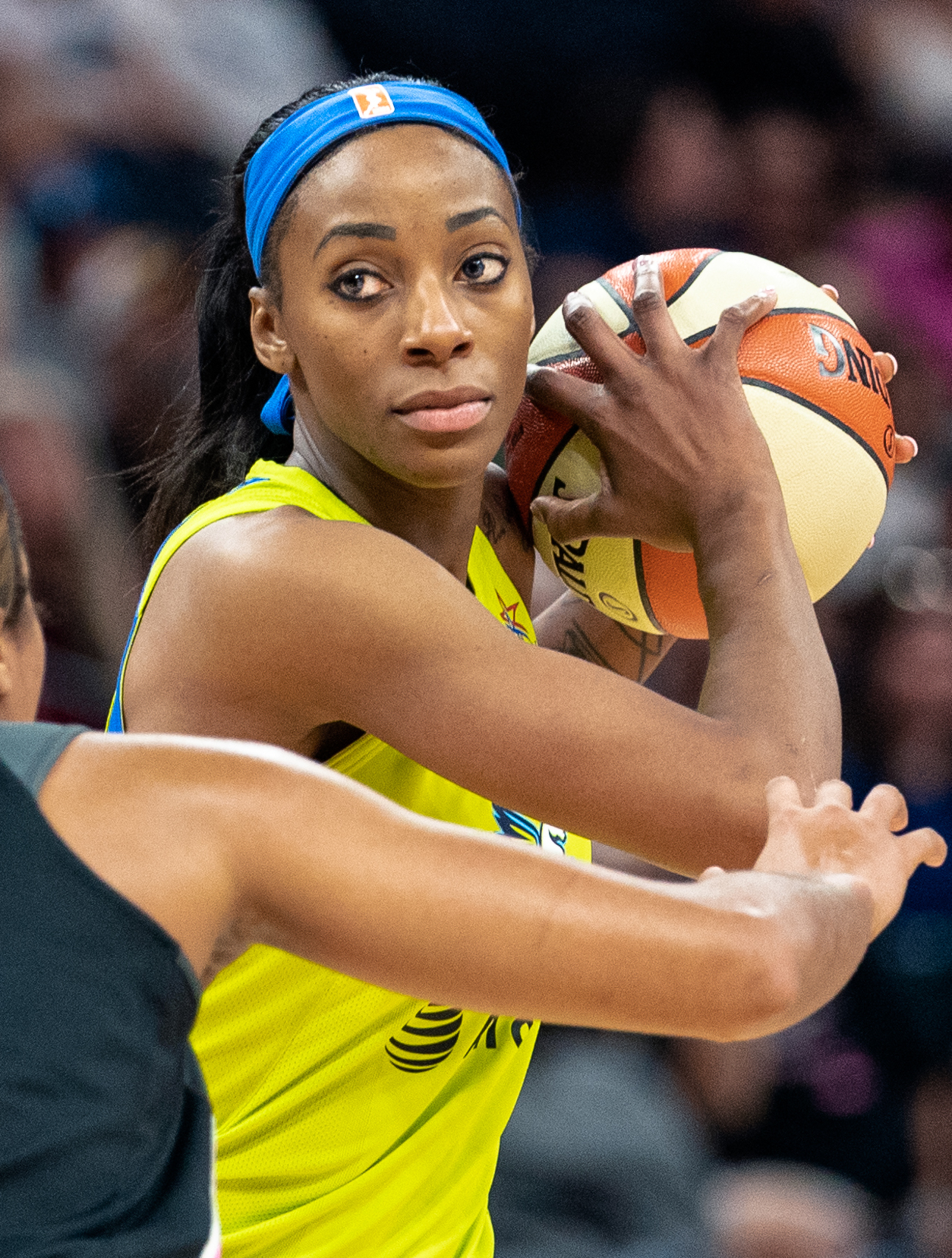
Basketball player – Glory Johnson

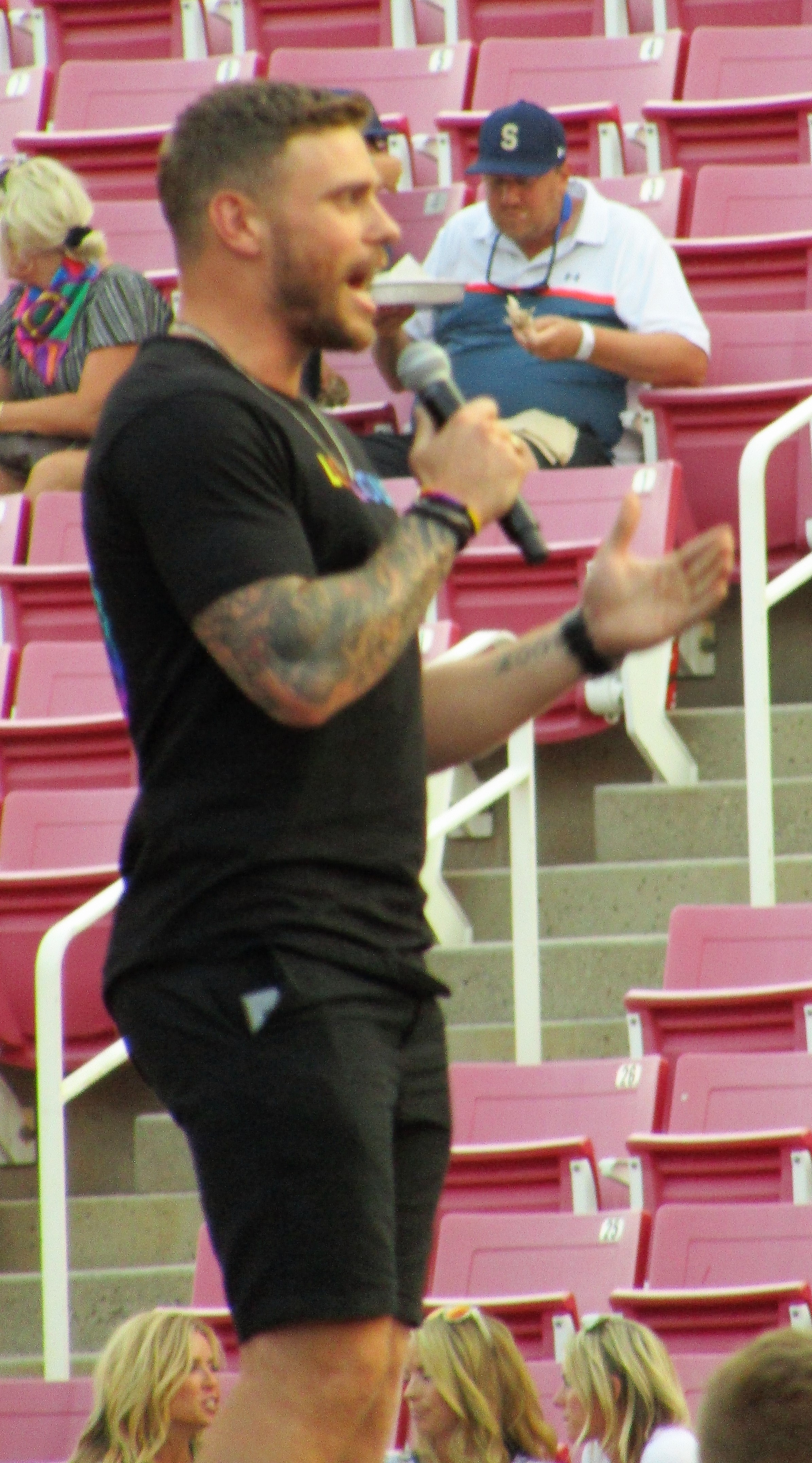
Freestyle skier – Gus Kenworthy

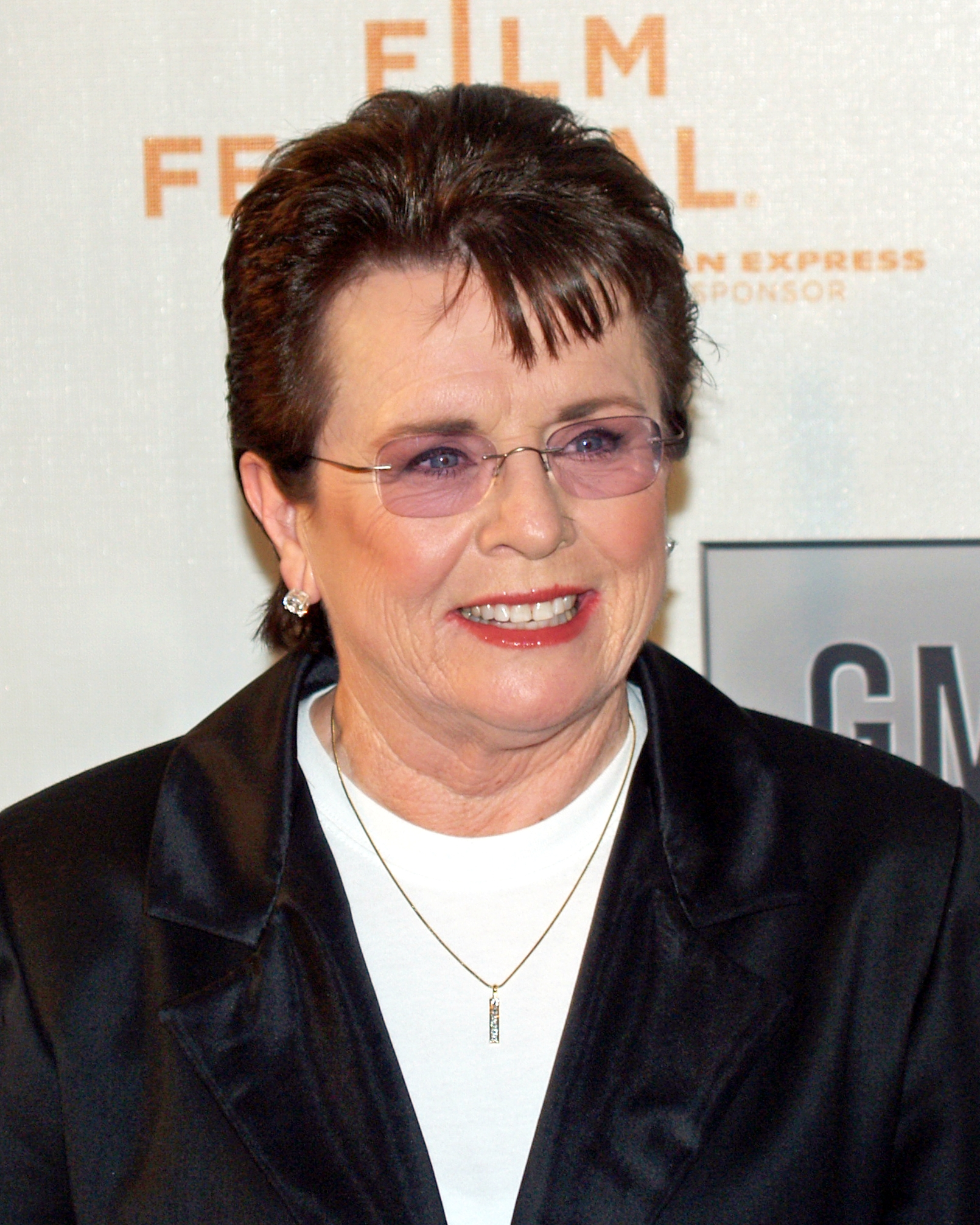
Tennis player – Billie Jean King

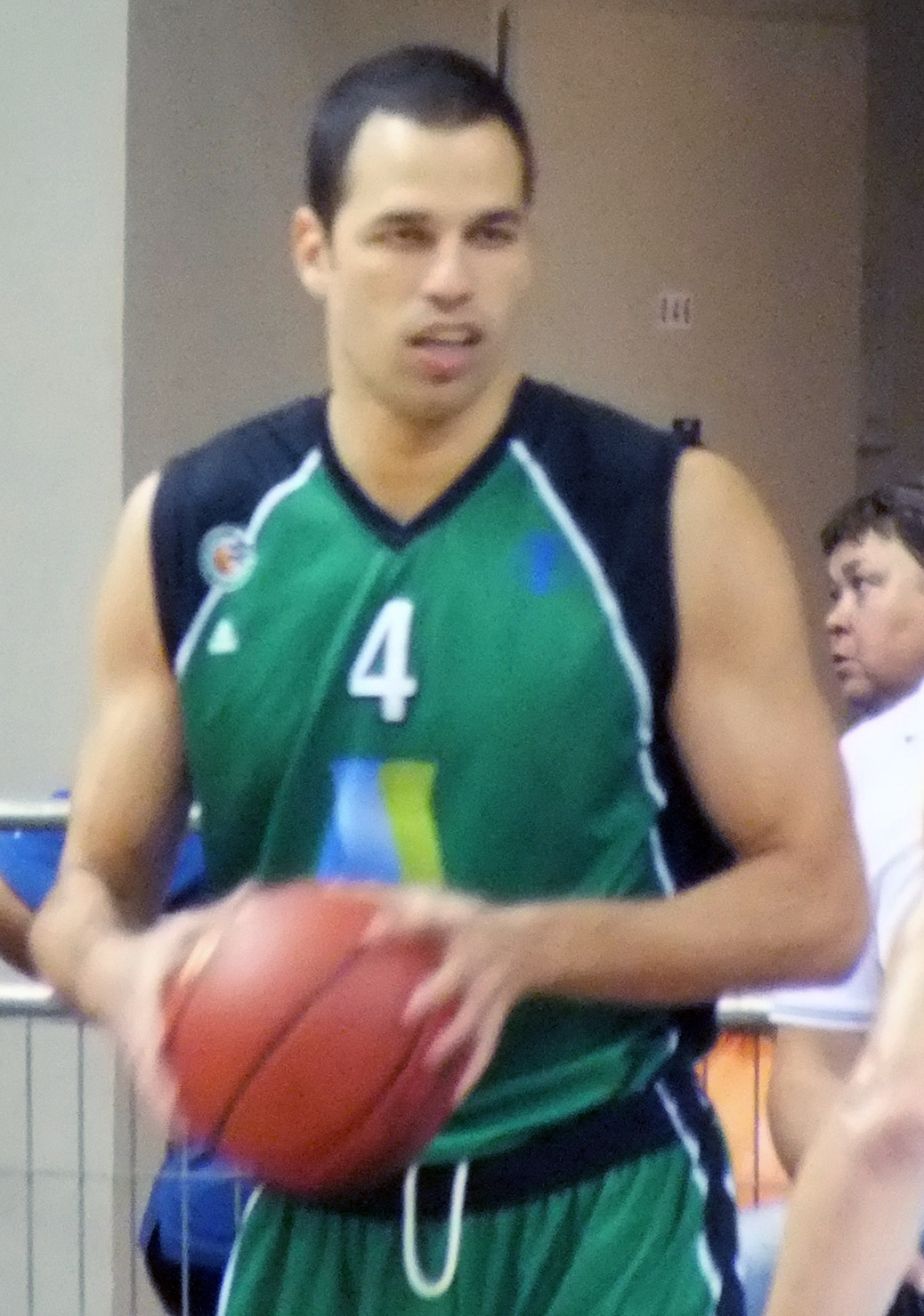
Basketball player – Uri Kokia

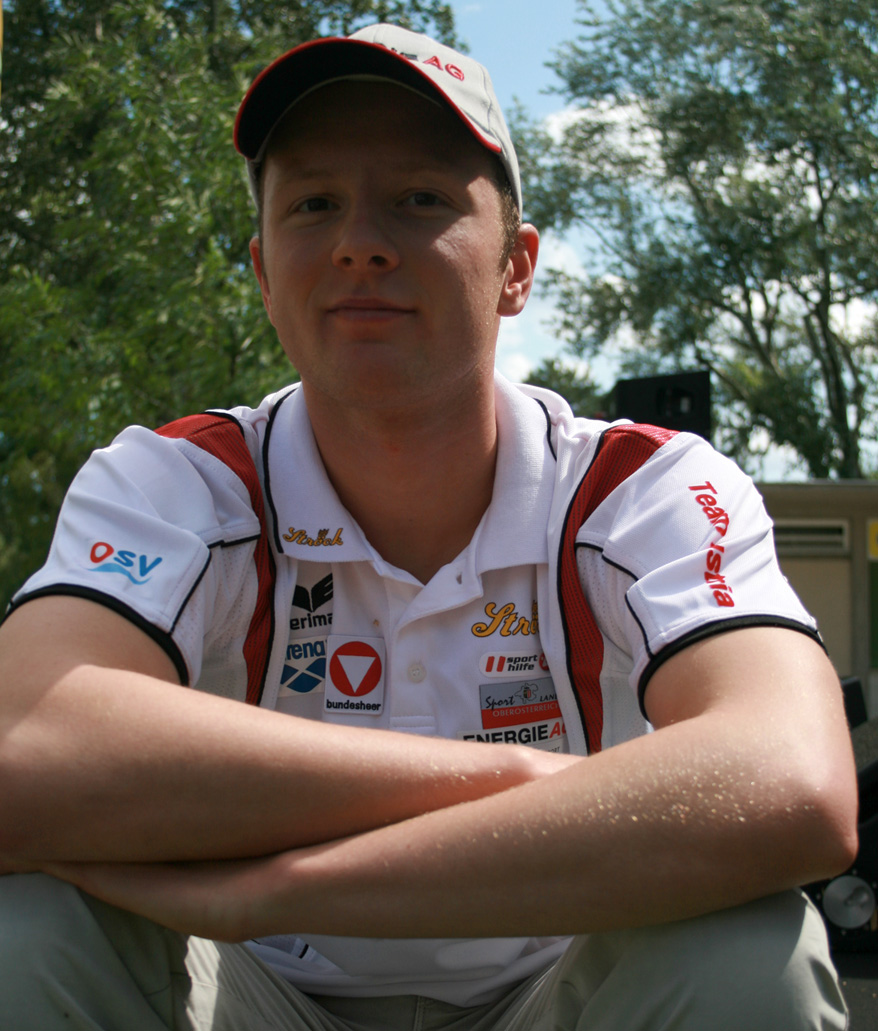
Swimmer – Dominik Koll

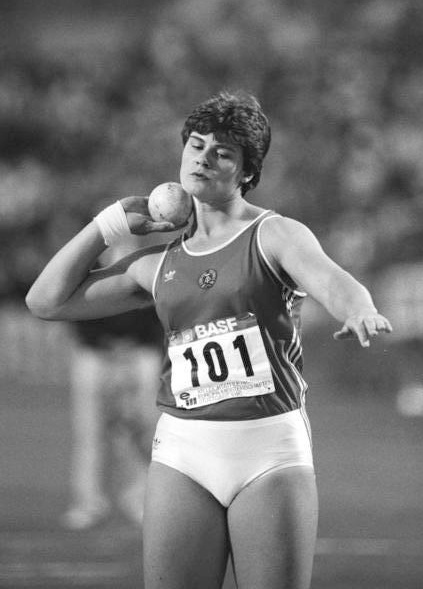
Track and field athlete – Andreas Krieger

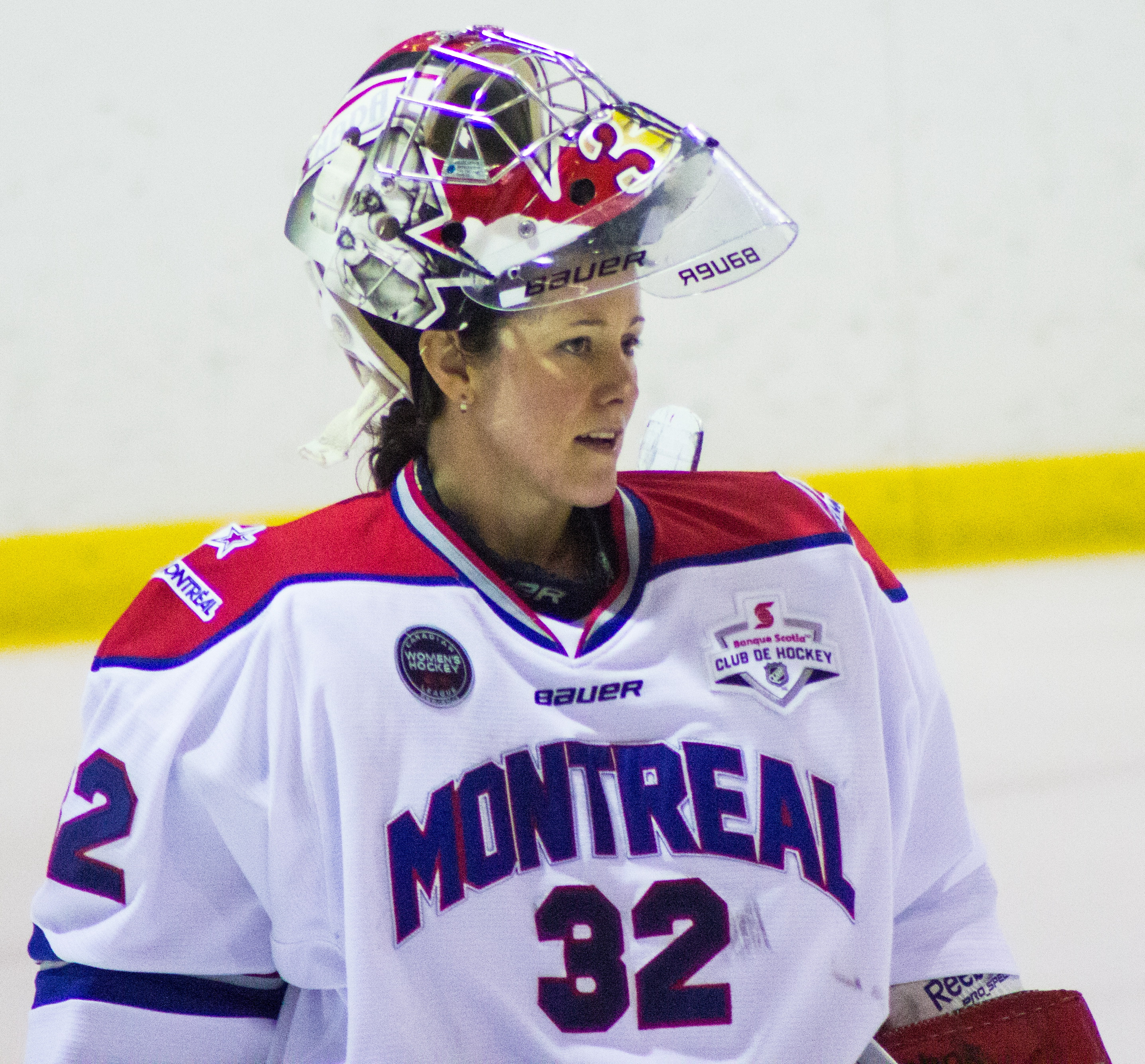
Ice hockey player – Charline Labonté

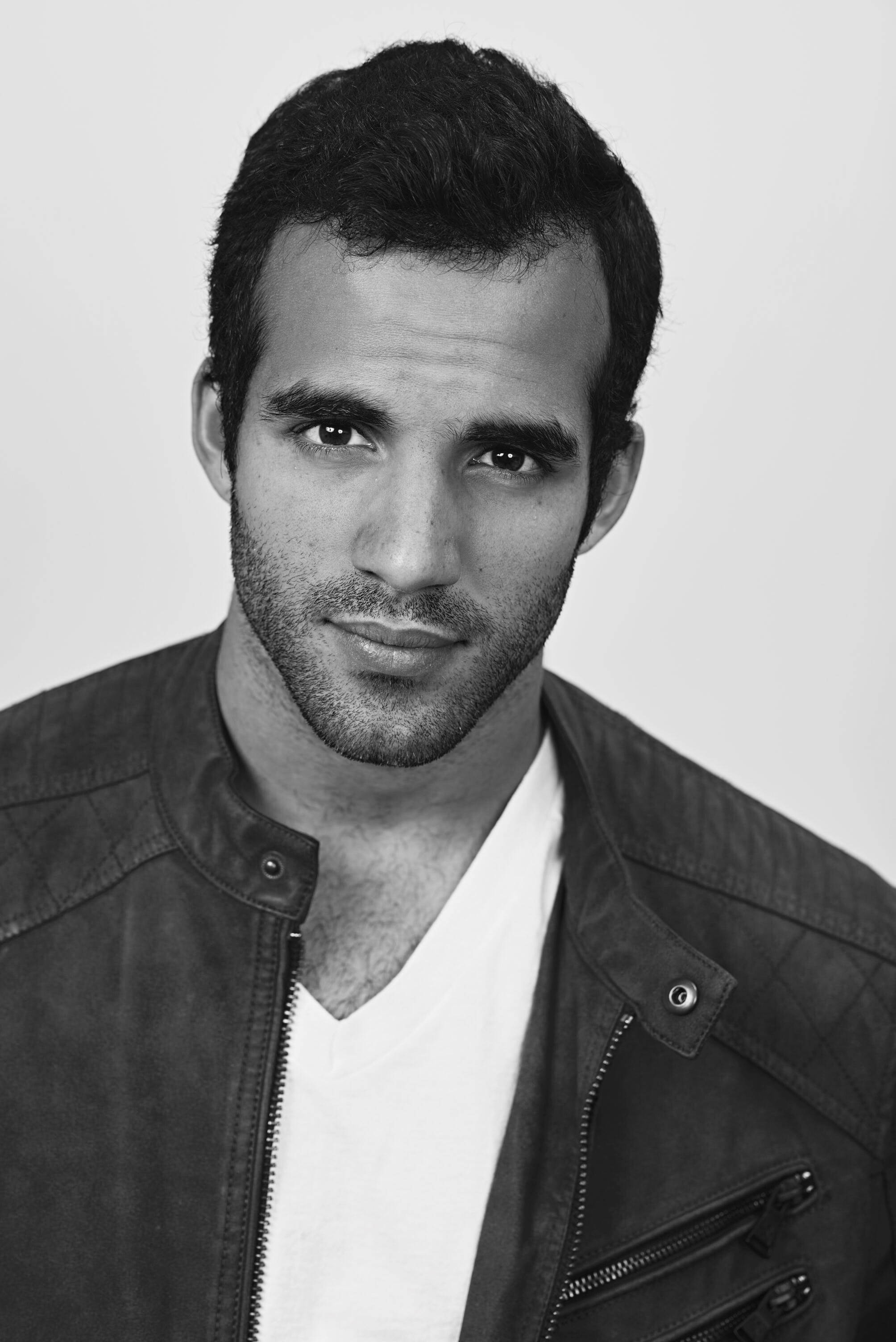
Gymnast – Danell Leyva

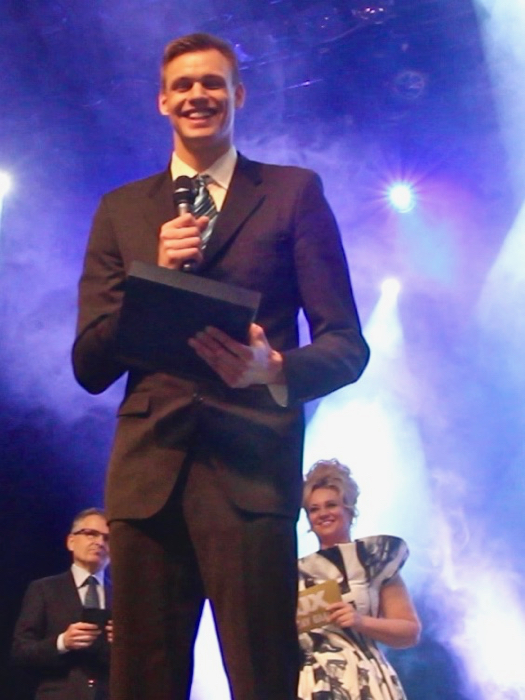
Swimmer – Ari-Pekka Liukkonen

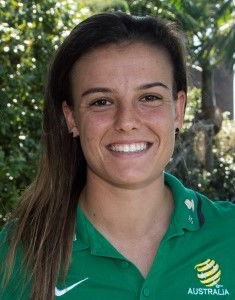
Footballer – Chloe Logarzo

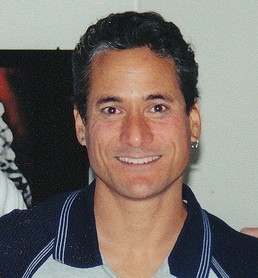
Diver – Greg Louganis

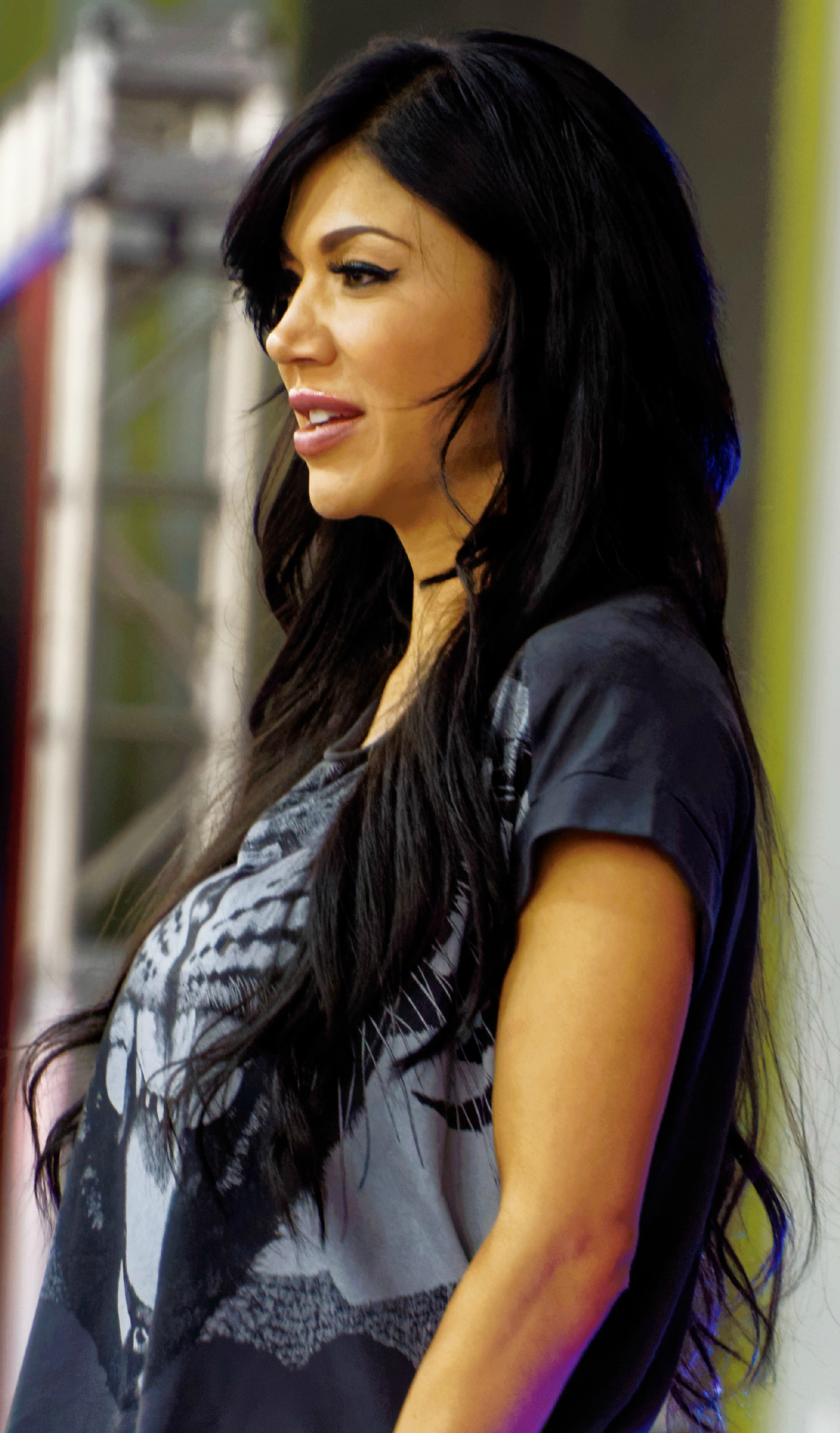
Wrestler – Rosa Mendes

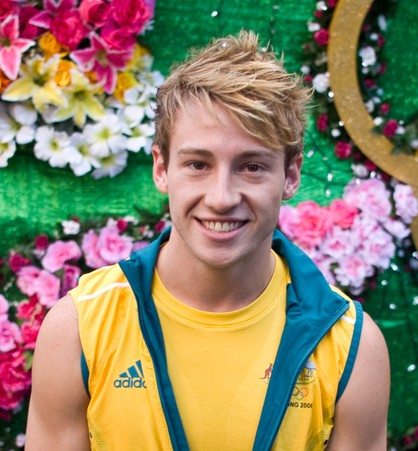
Diver – Matthew Mitcham

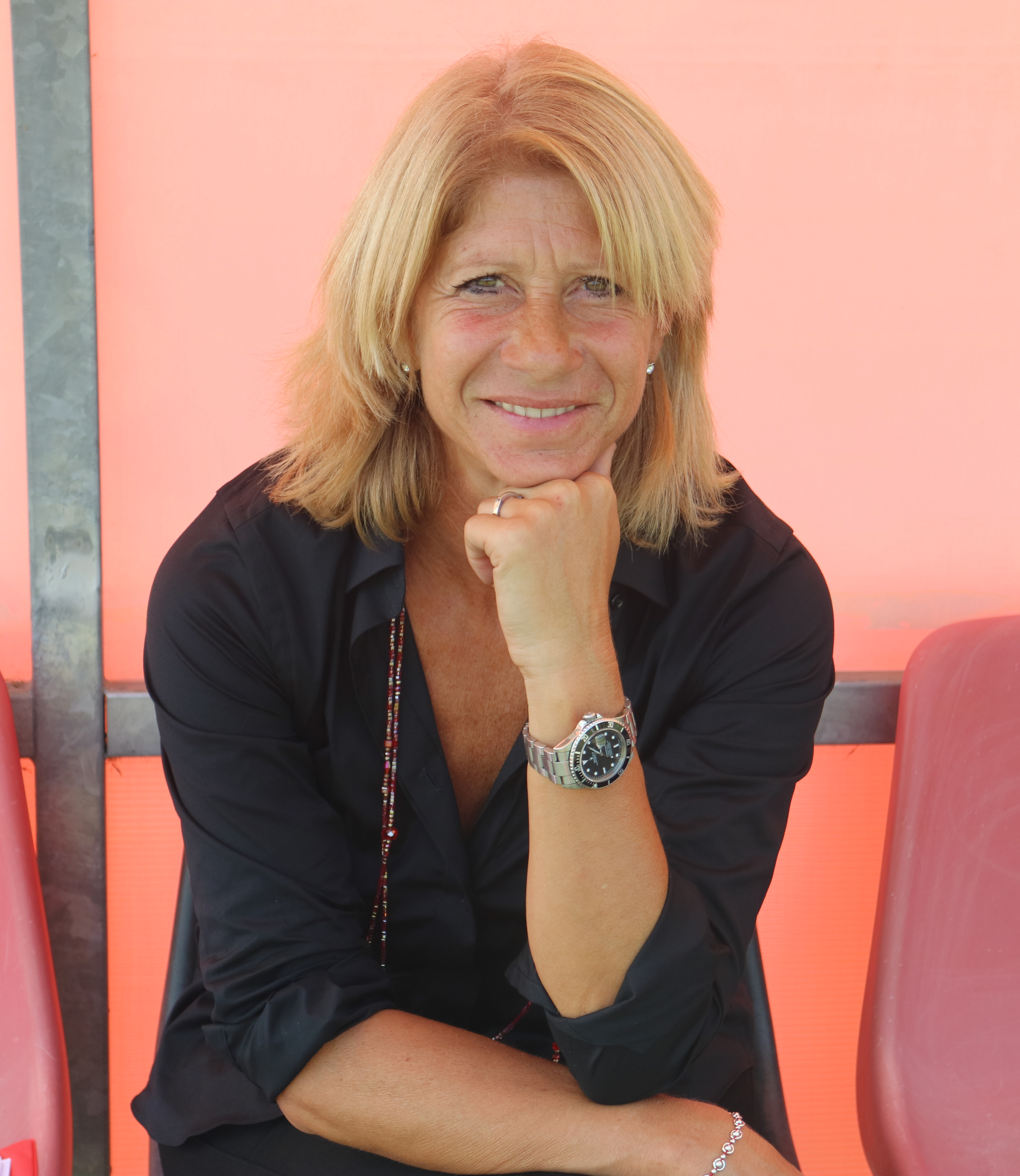
Footballer – Carolina Morace

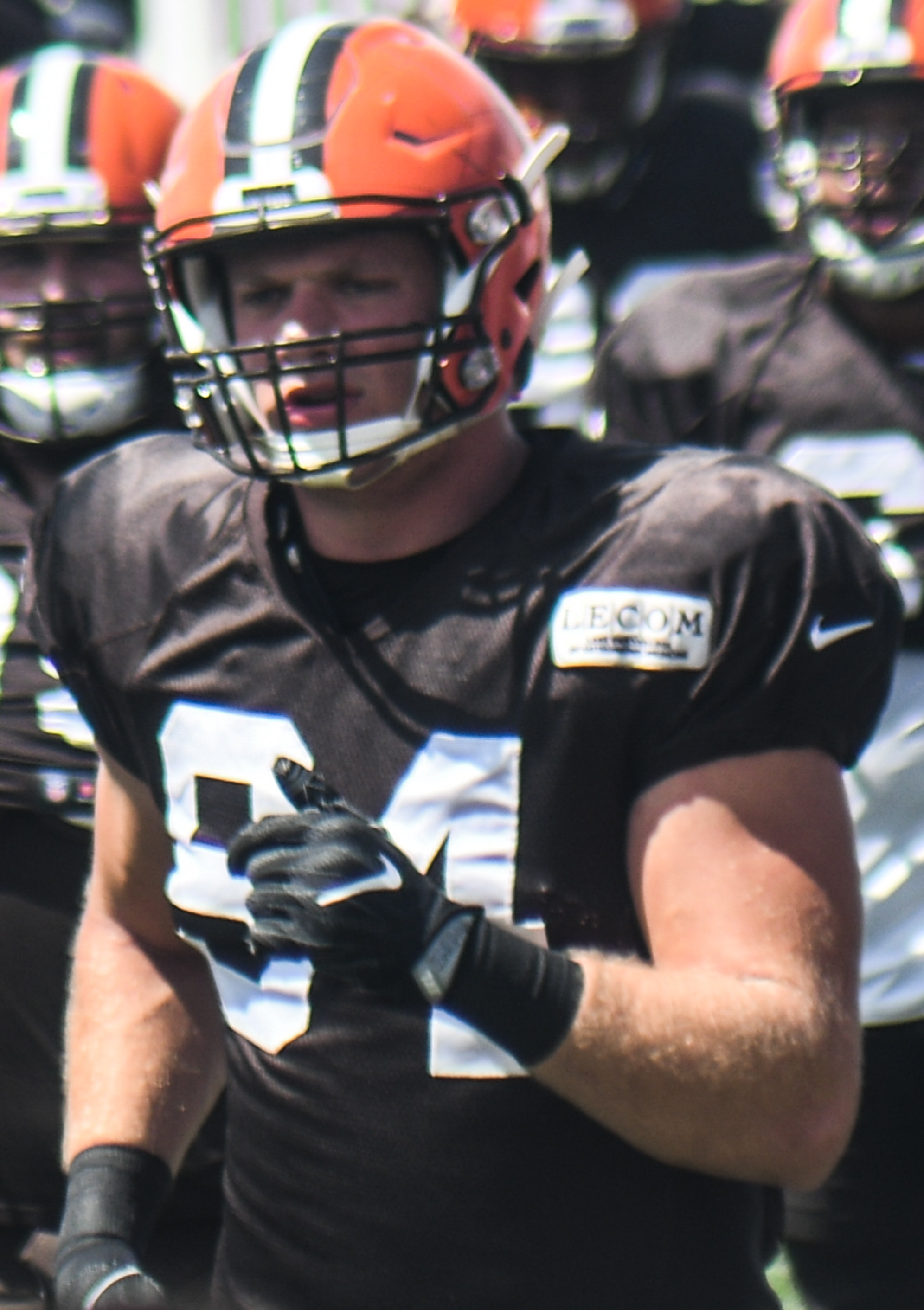
American football player – Carl Nassib

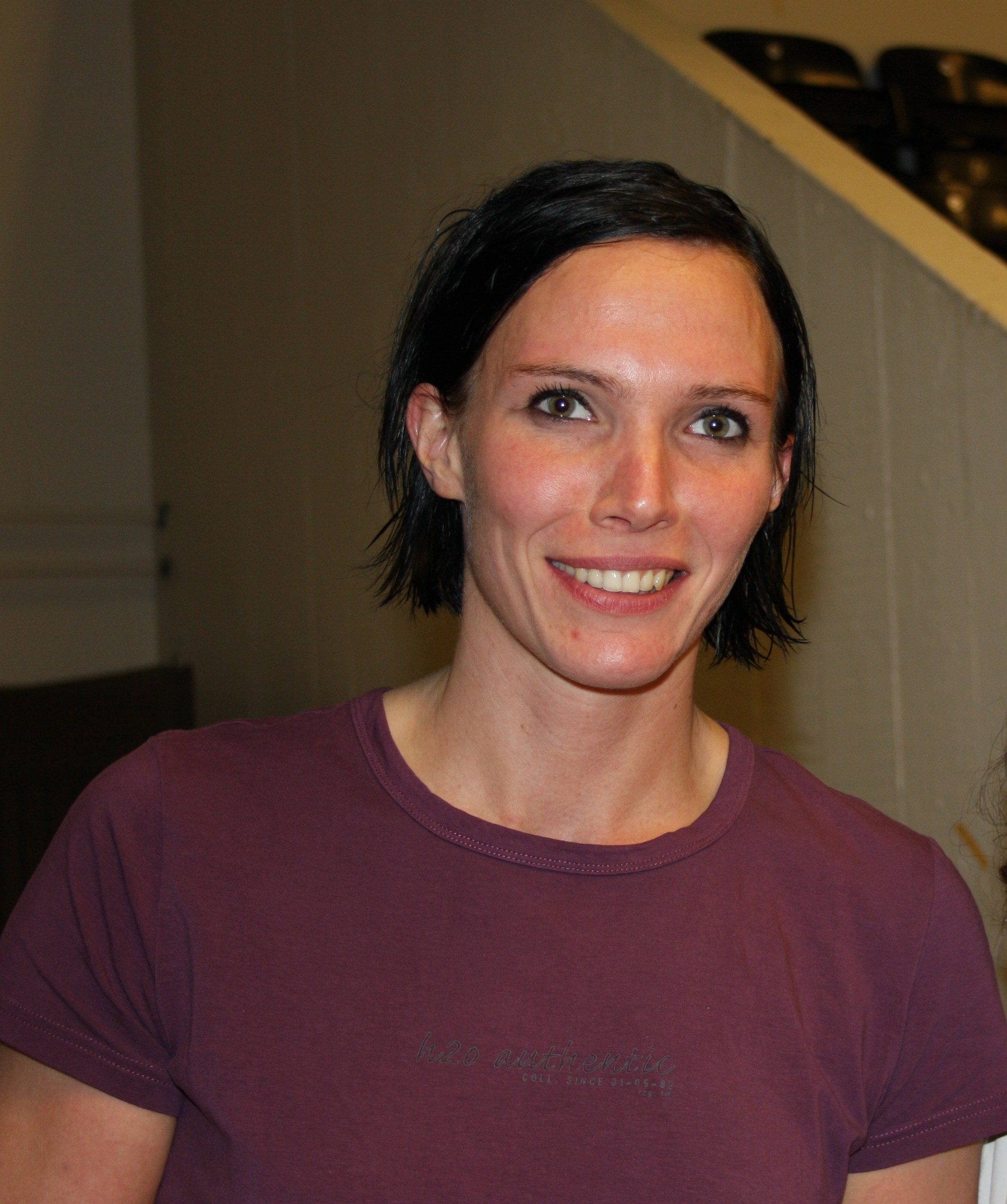
Handball player – Katja Nyberg

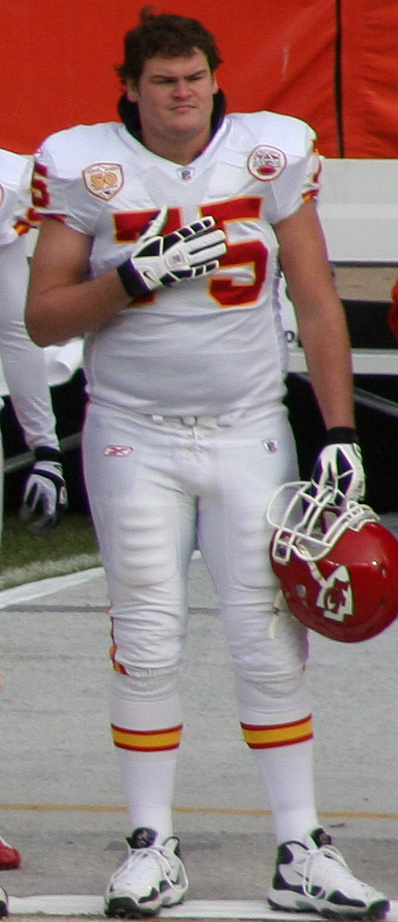
American football player – Ryan O'Callaghan

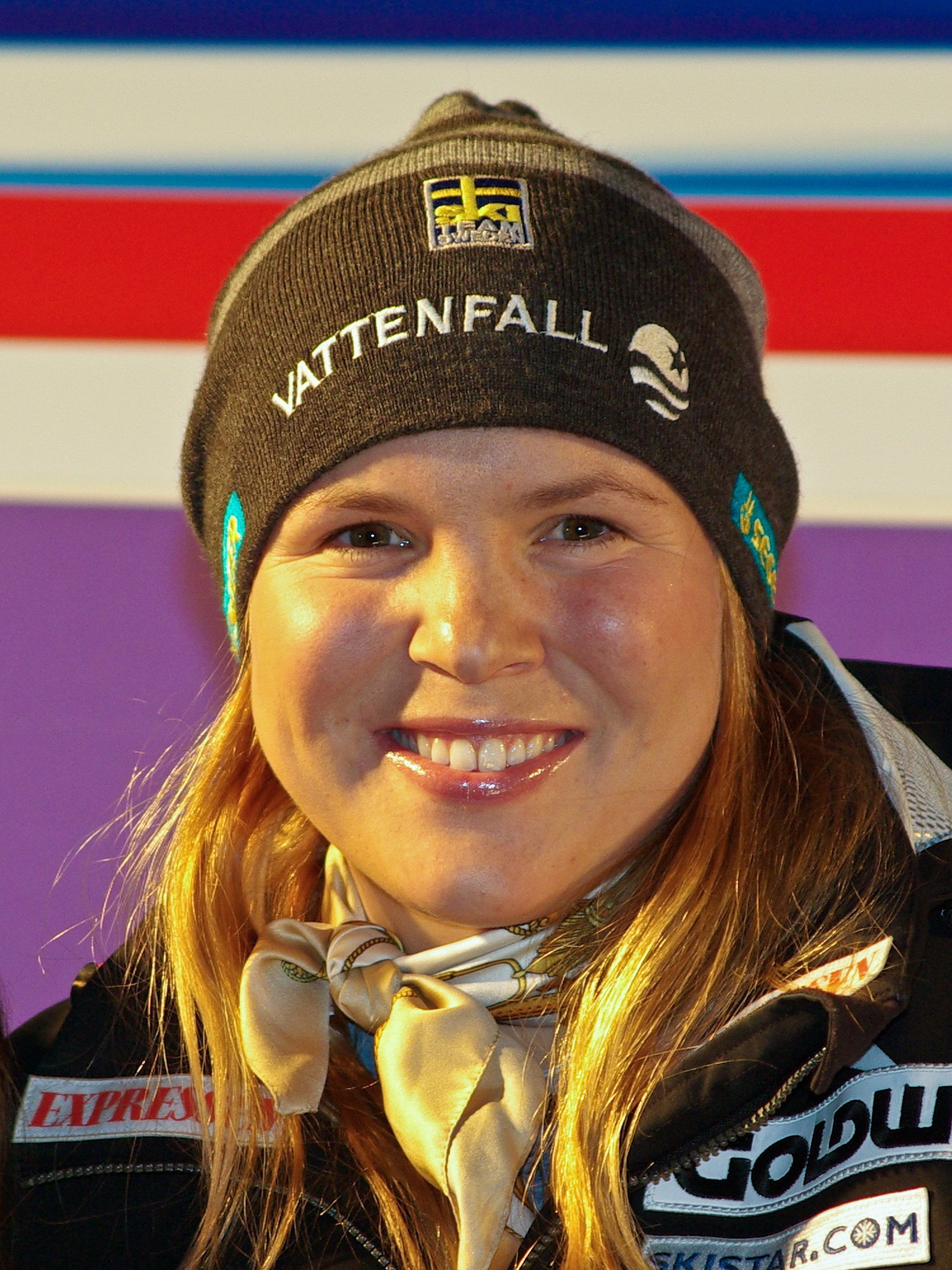
Alpine skier – Anja Pärson

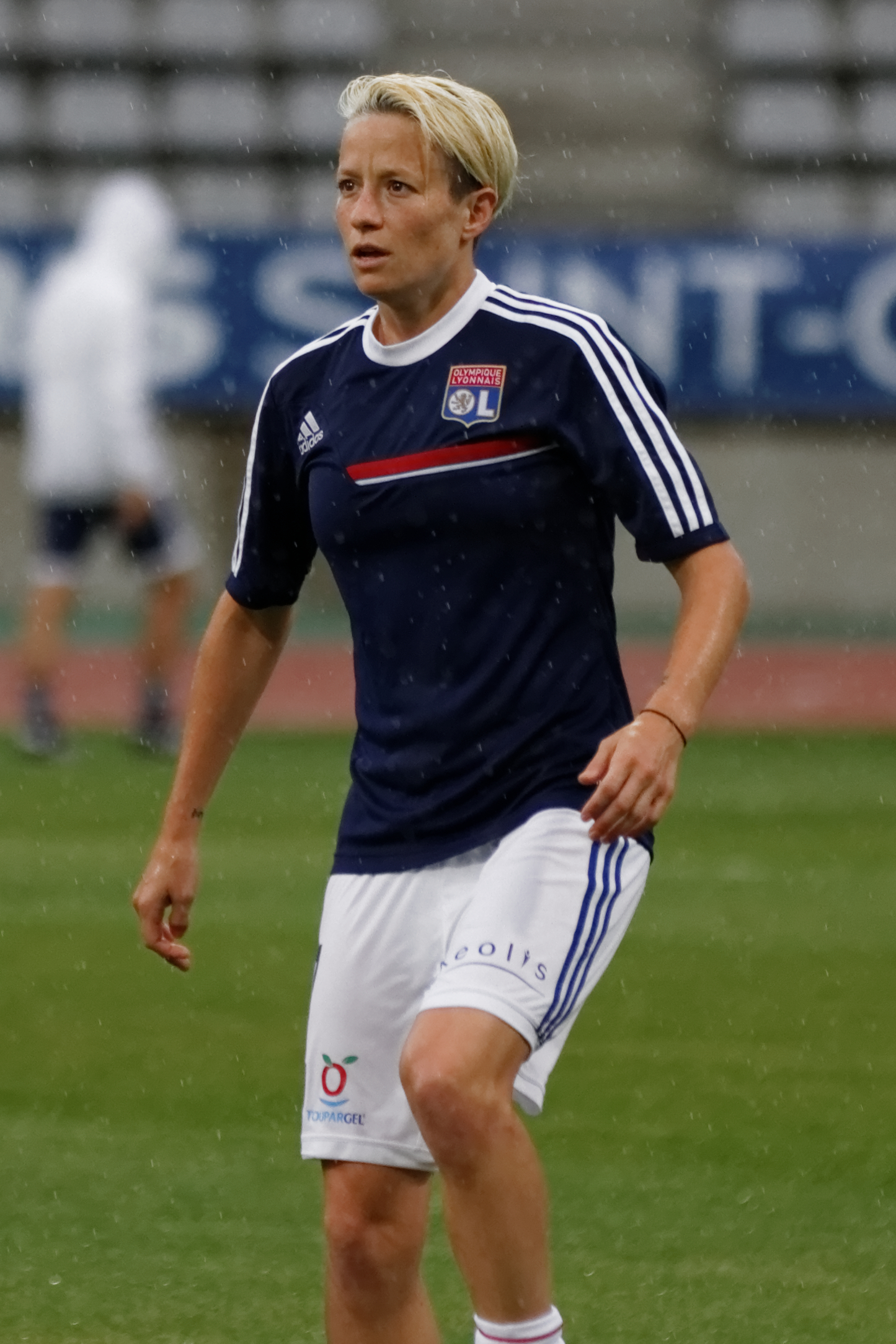
Footballer – Megan Rapinoe

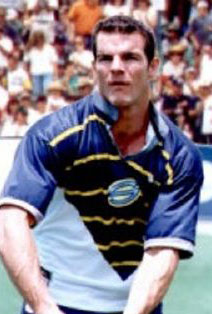
Rugby league player – Ian Roberts

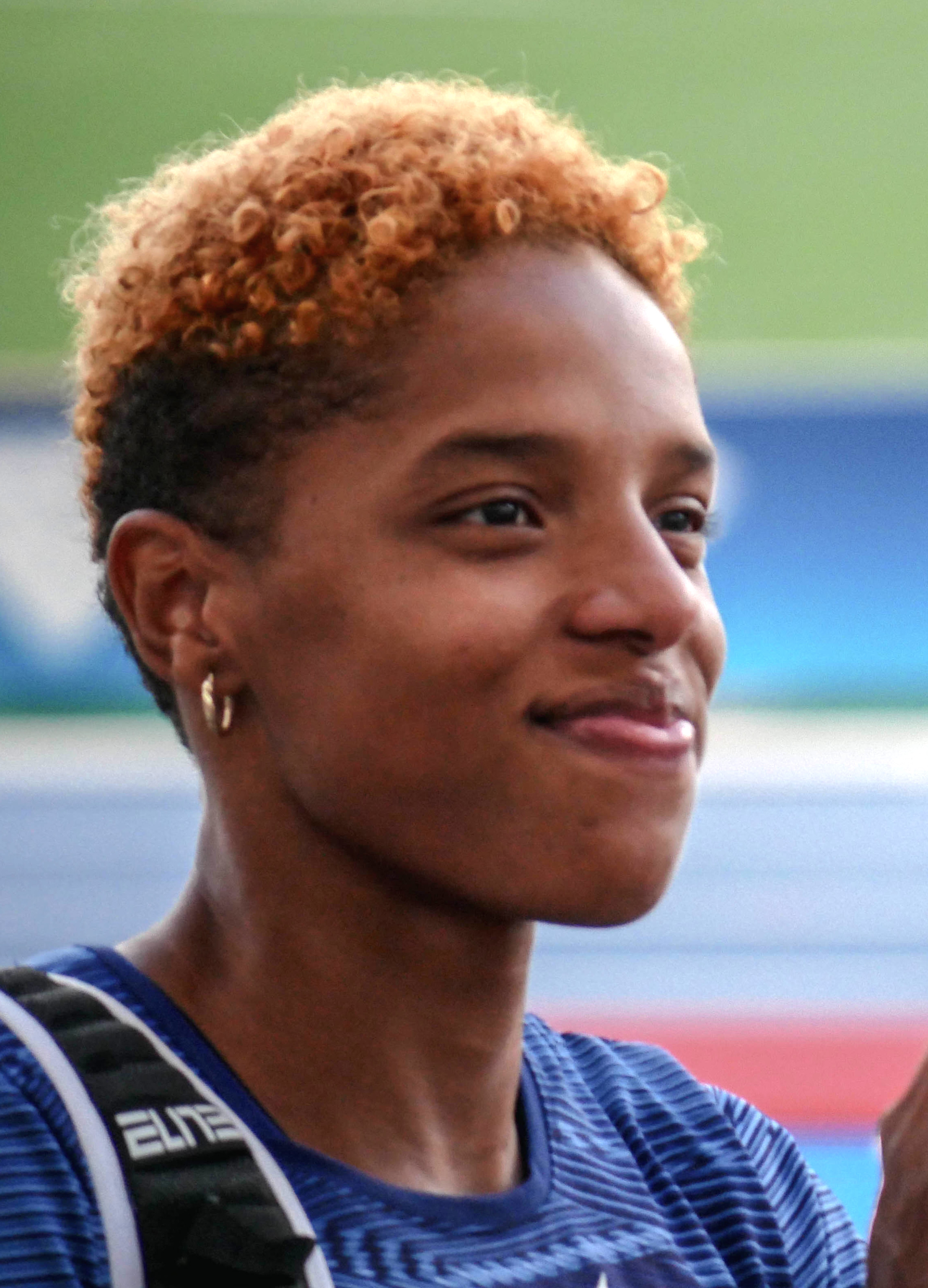
Track and field athlete – Yulimar Rojas

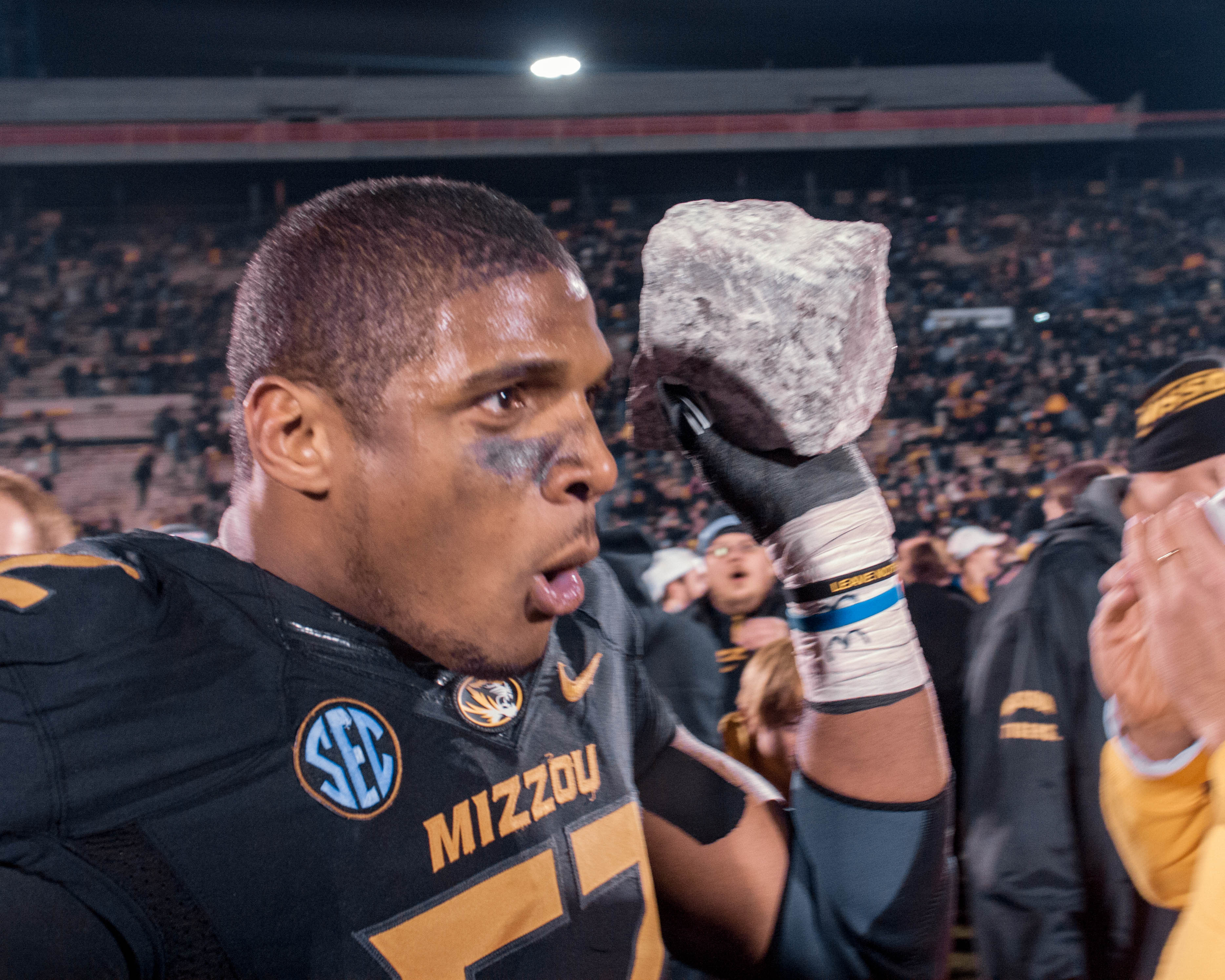
American football player – Michael Sam

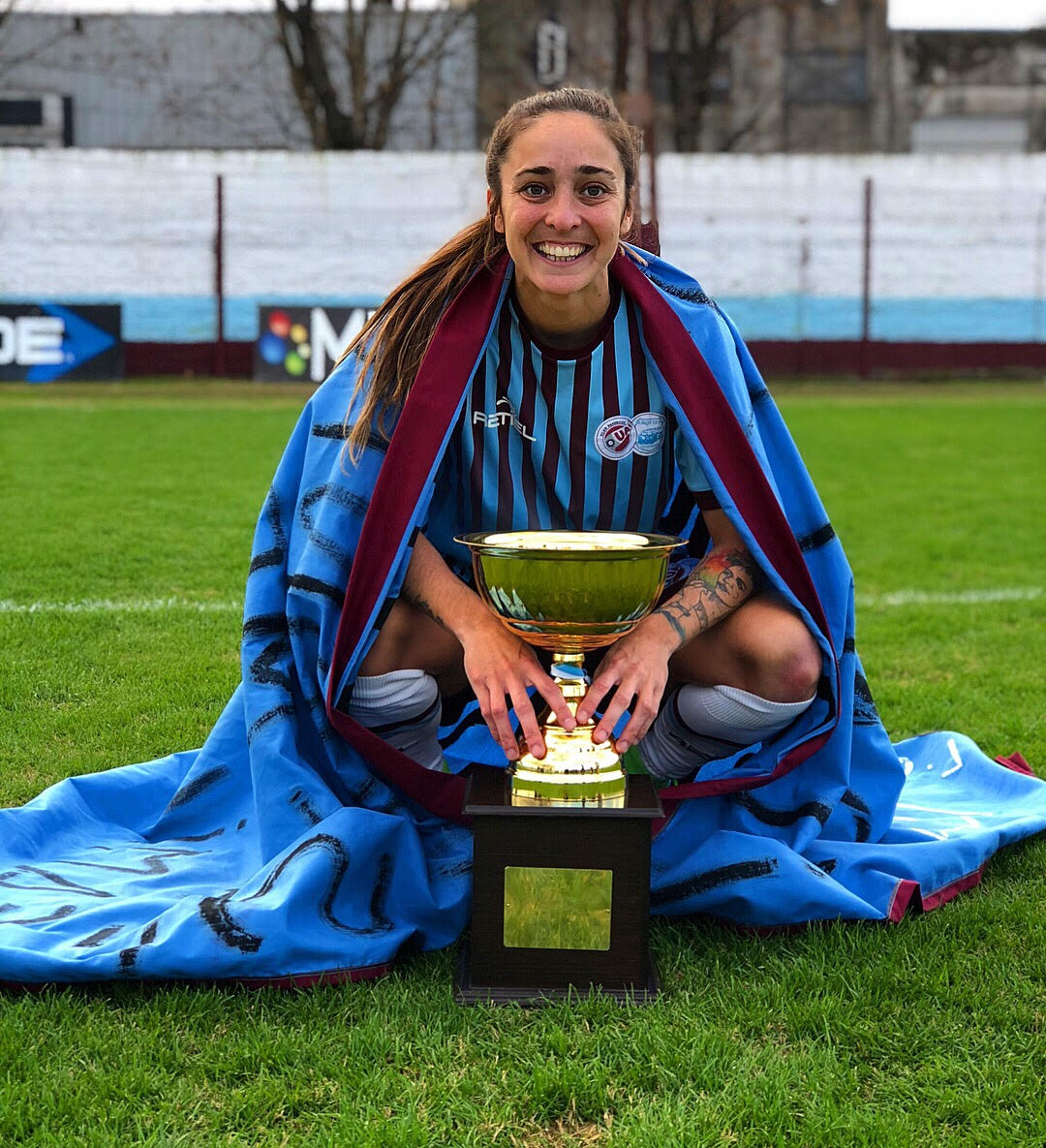
Footballer – Macarena Sánchez

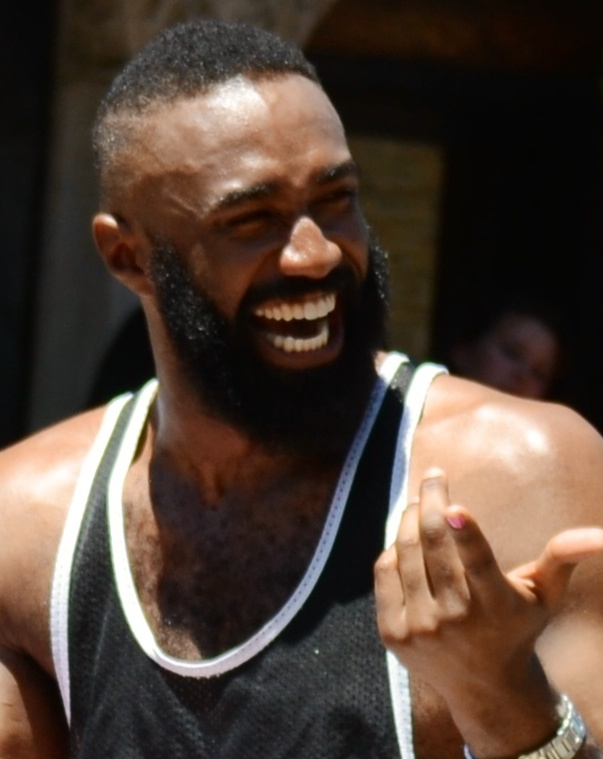
Basketball player – Will Sheridan

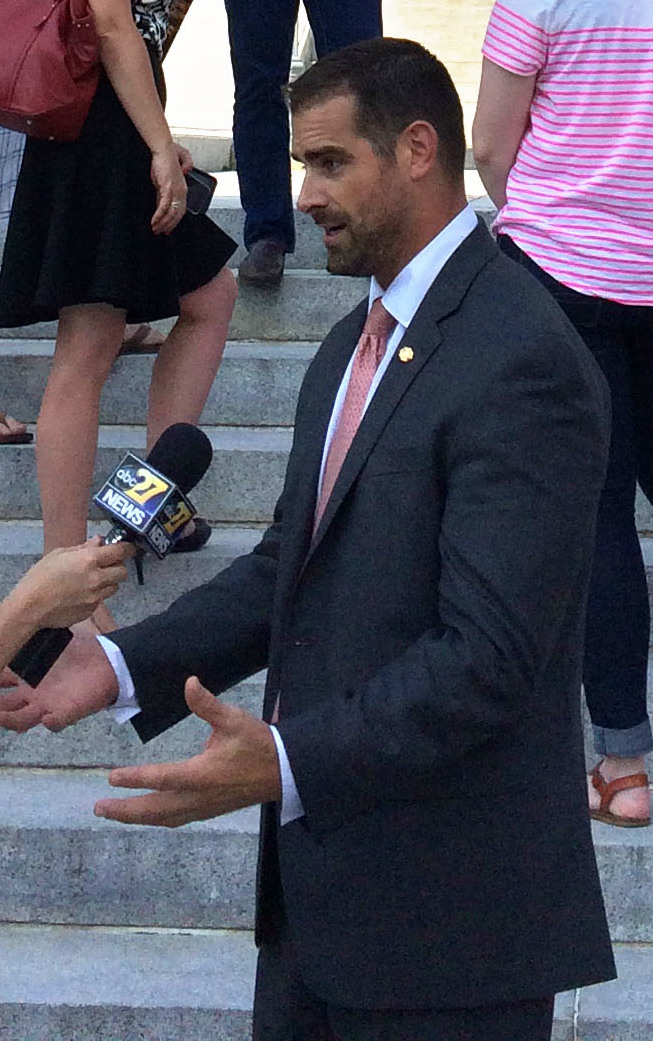
American football player and politician – Brian Sims

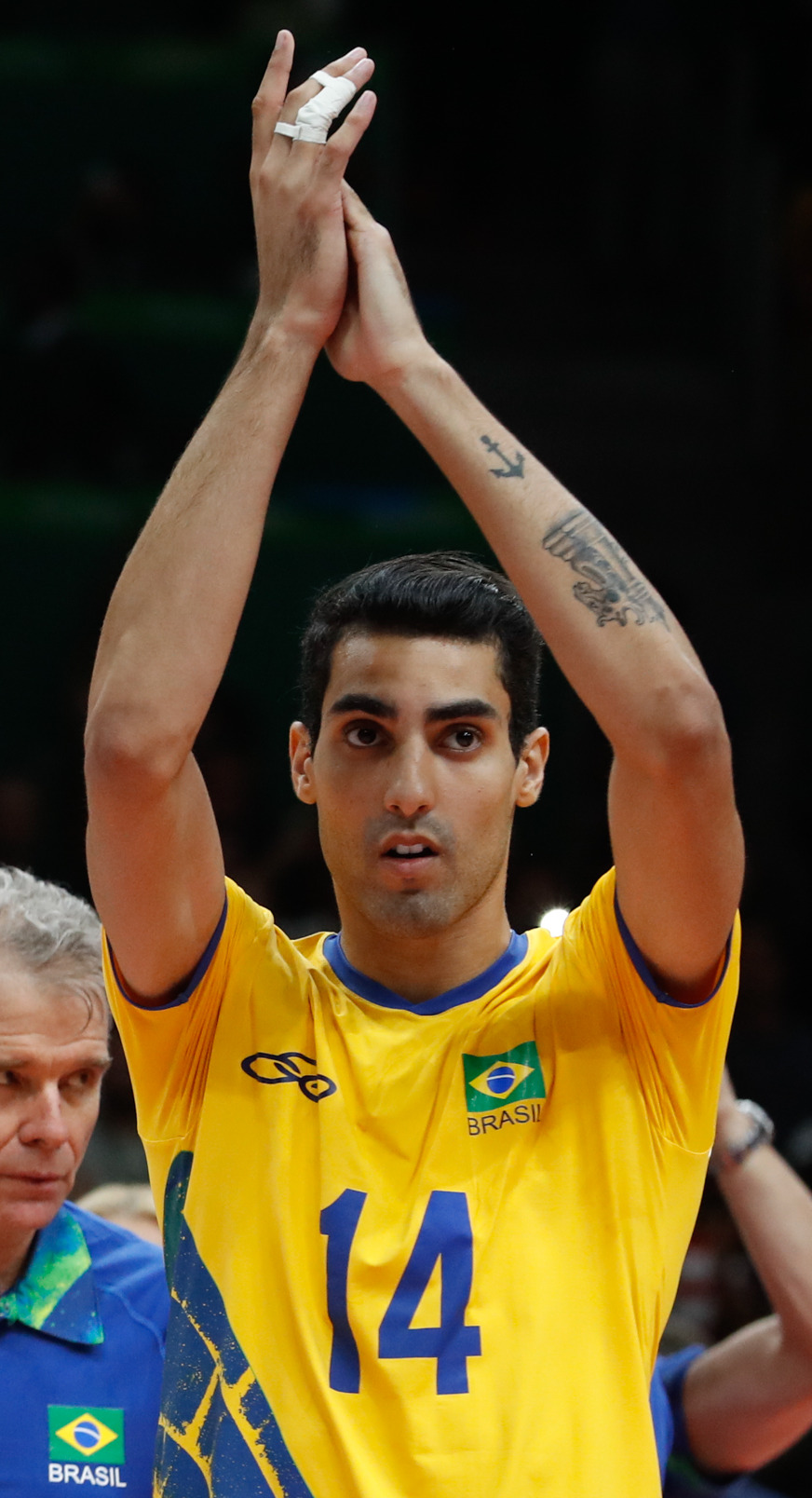
Volleyball player – Douglas Souza

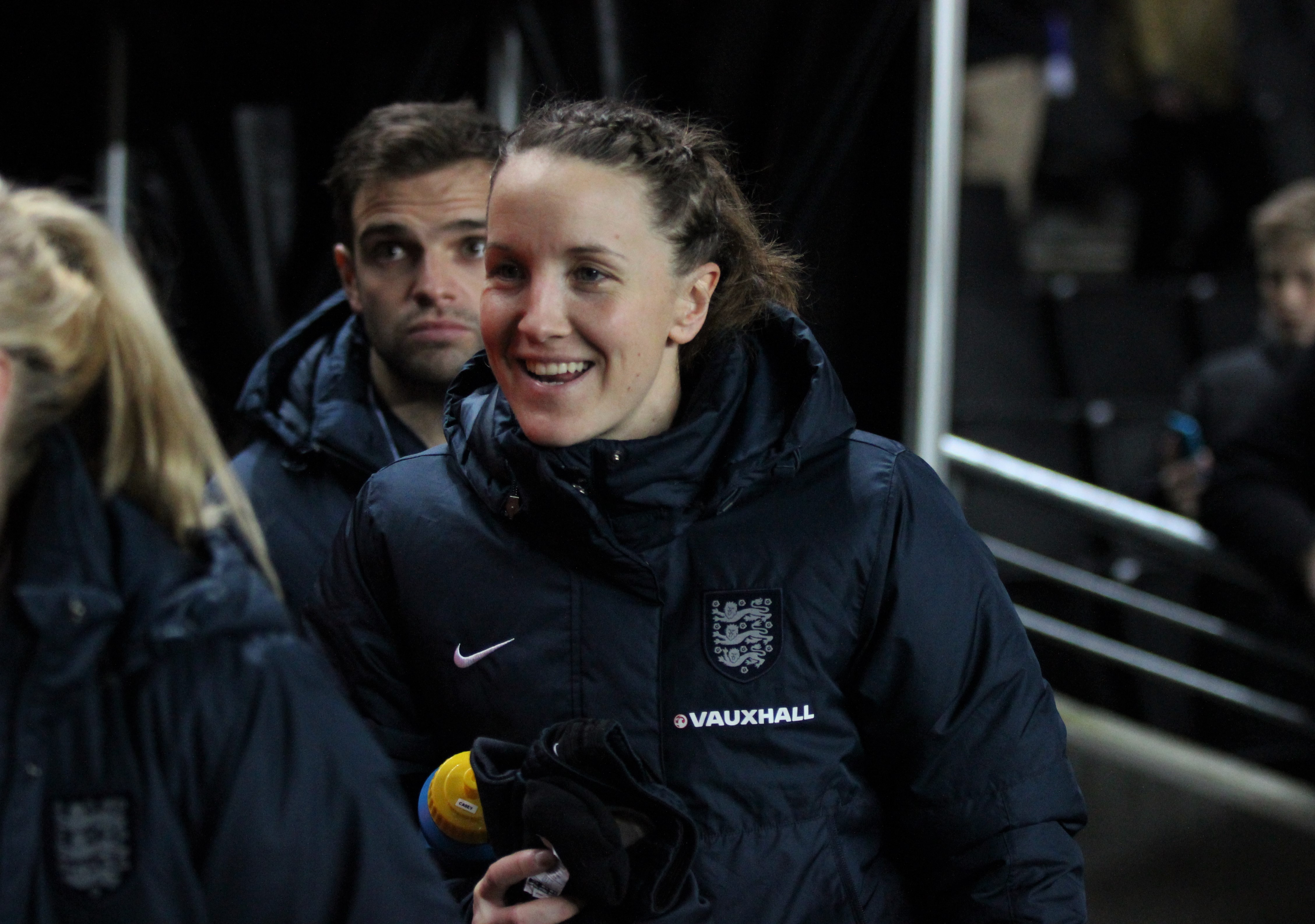
Footballer – Casey Stoney

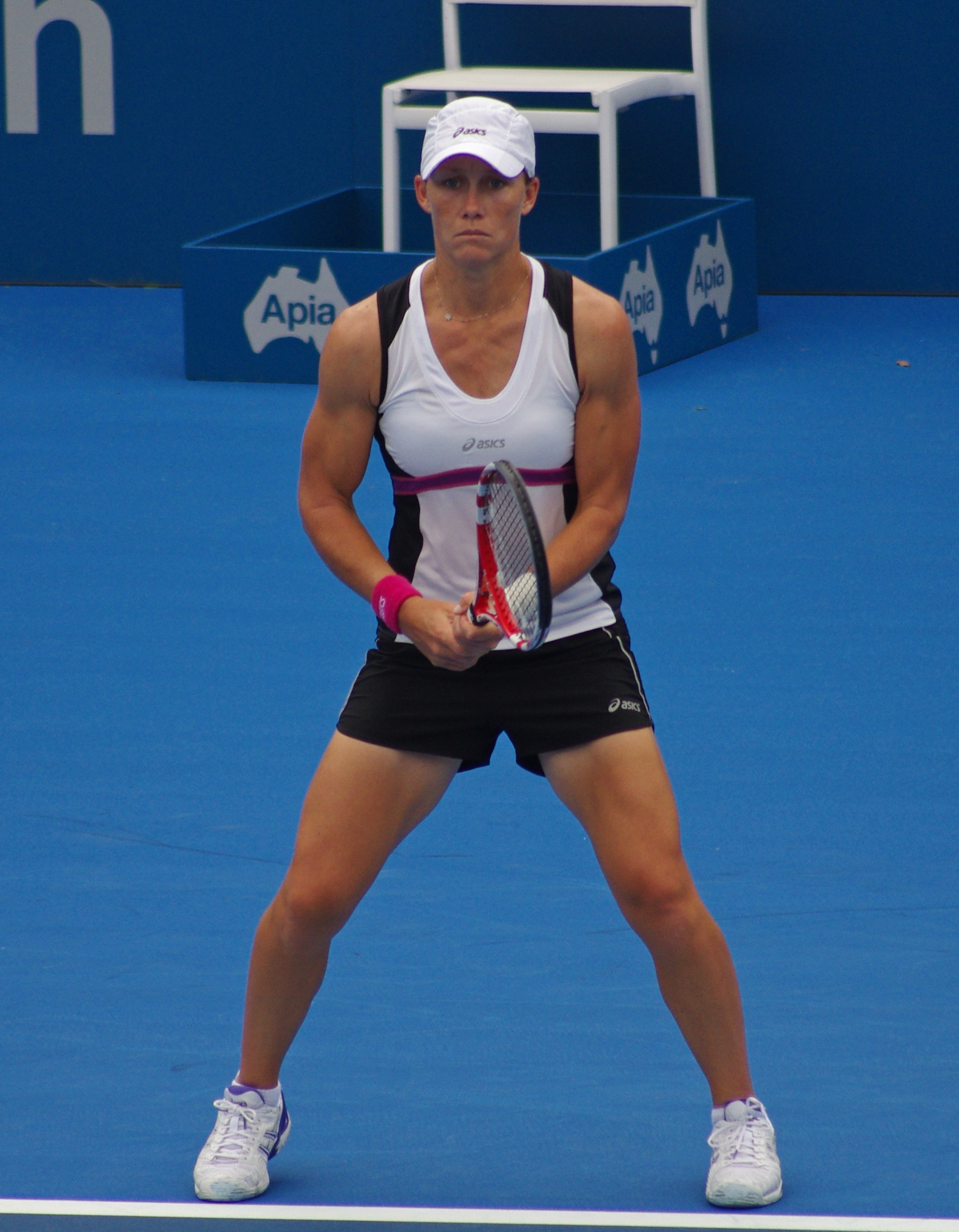
Tennis player – Sam Stosur

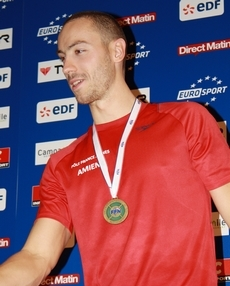
Swimmer – Jérémy Stravius

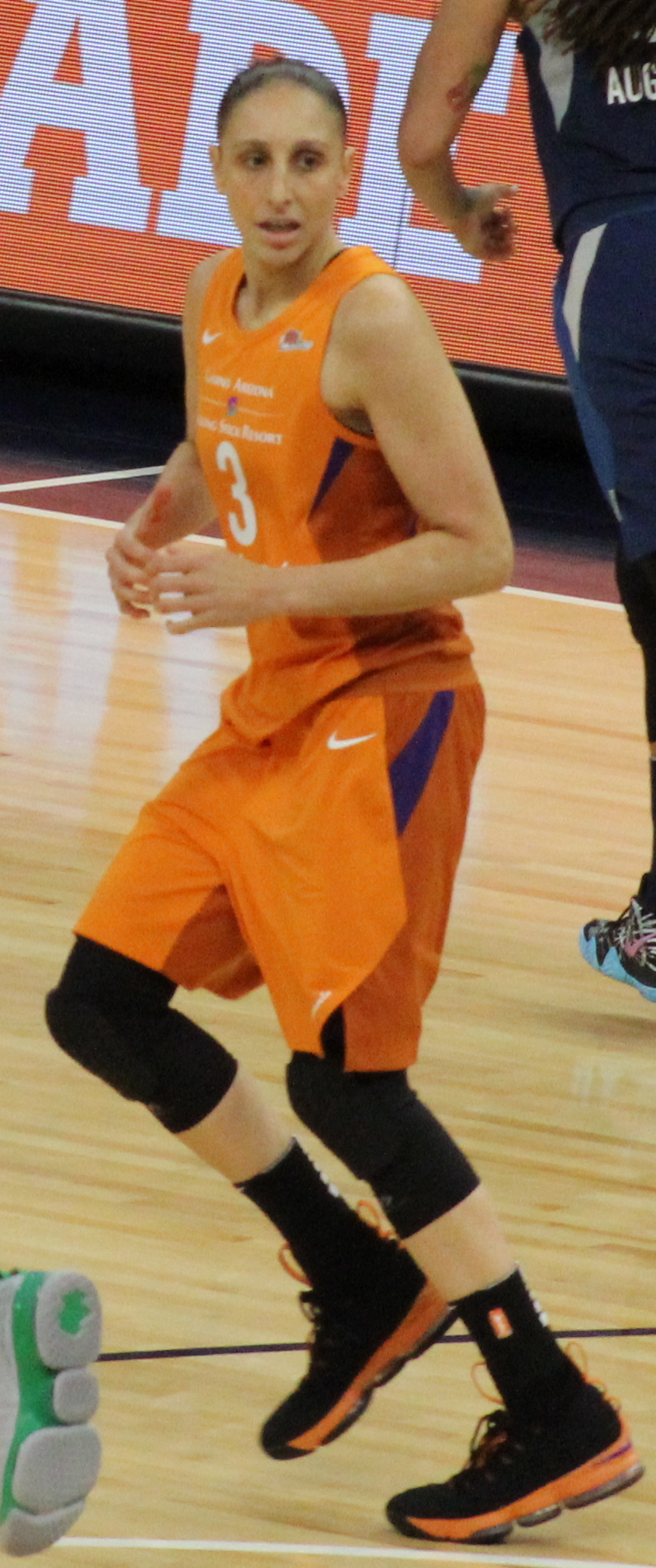
Basketball player – Diana Taurasi

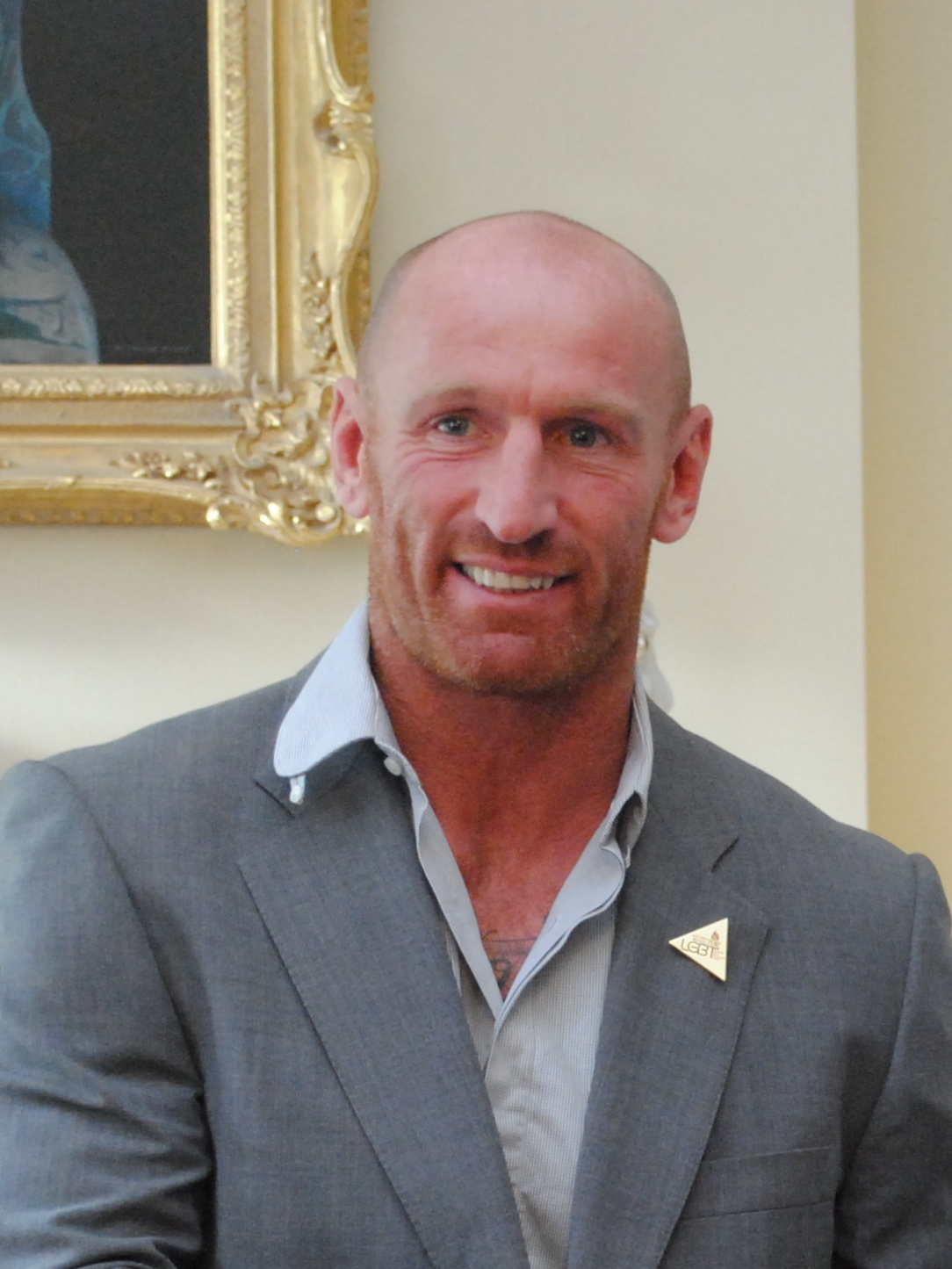
Rugby player – Gareth Thomas

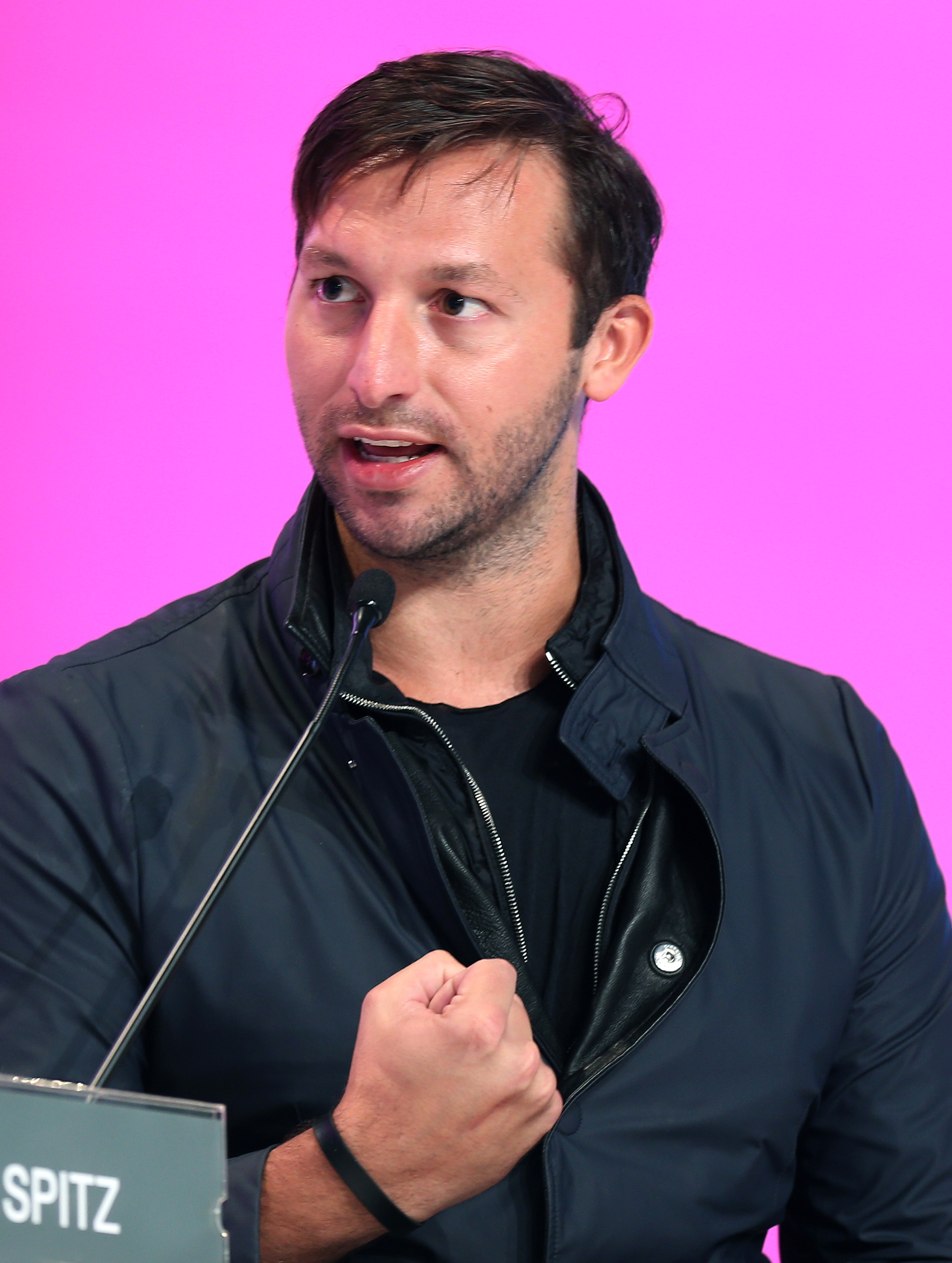
Swimmer – Ian Thorpe

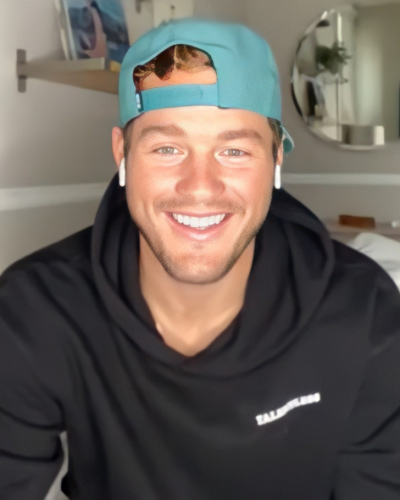
American football player – Colton Underwood

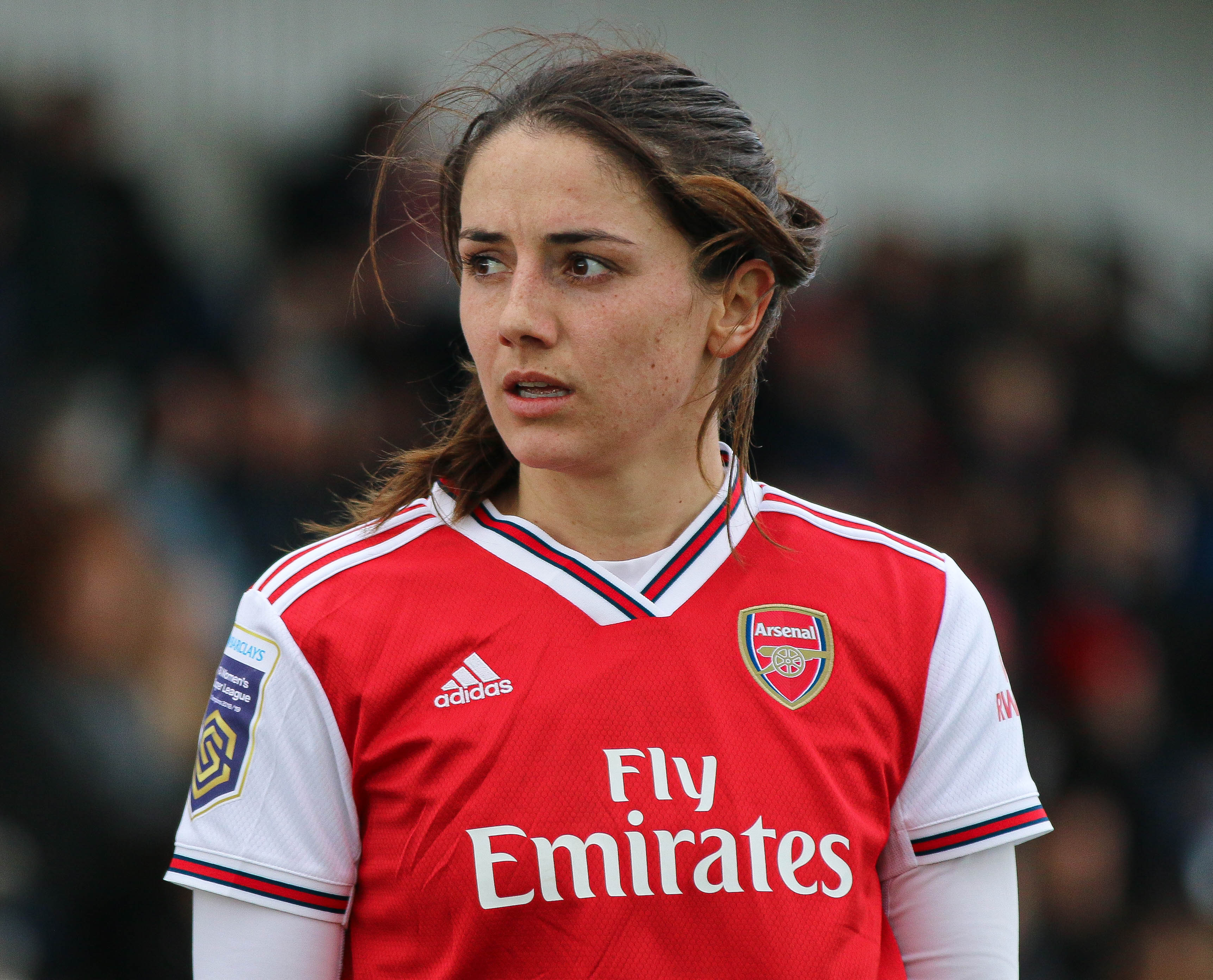
Footballer – Daniëlle van de Donk

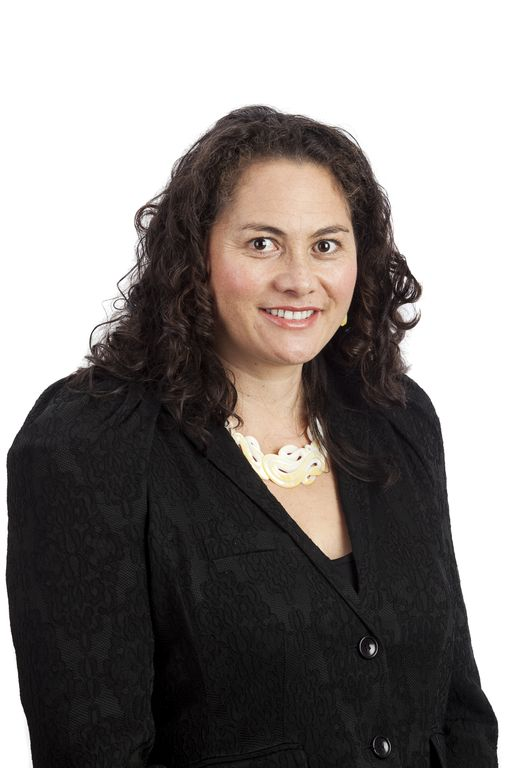
Rugby player – Louisa Wall

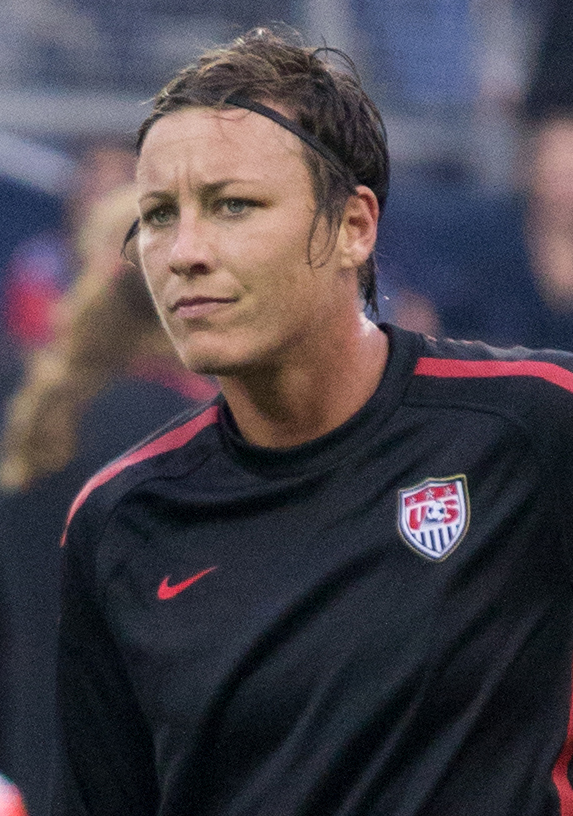
Footballer – Abby Wambach

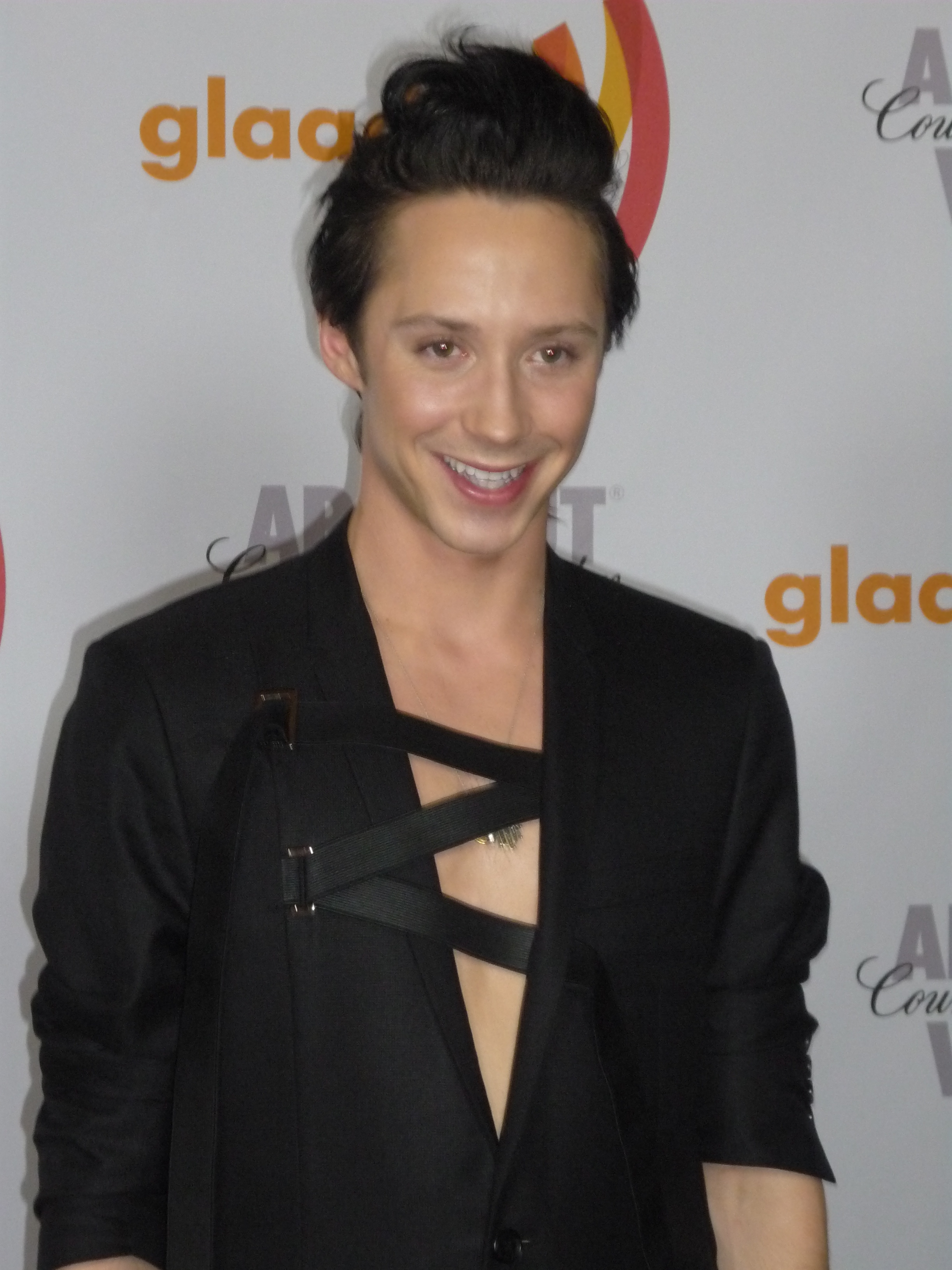
Figure skater – Johnny Weir

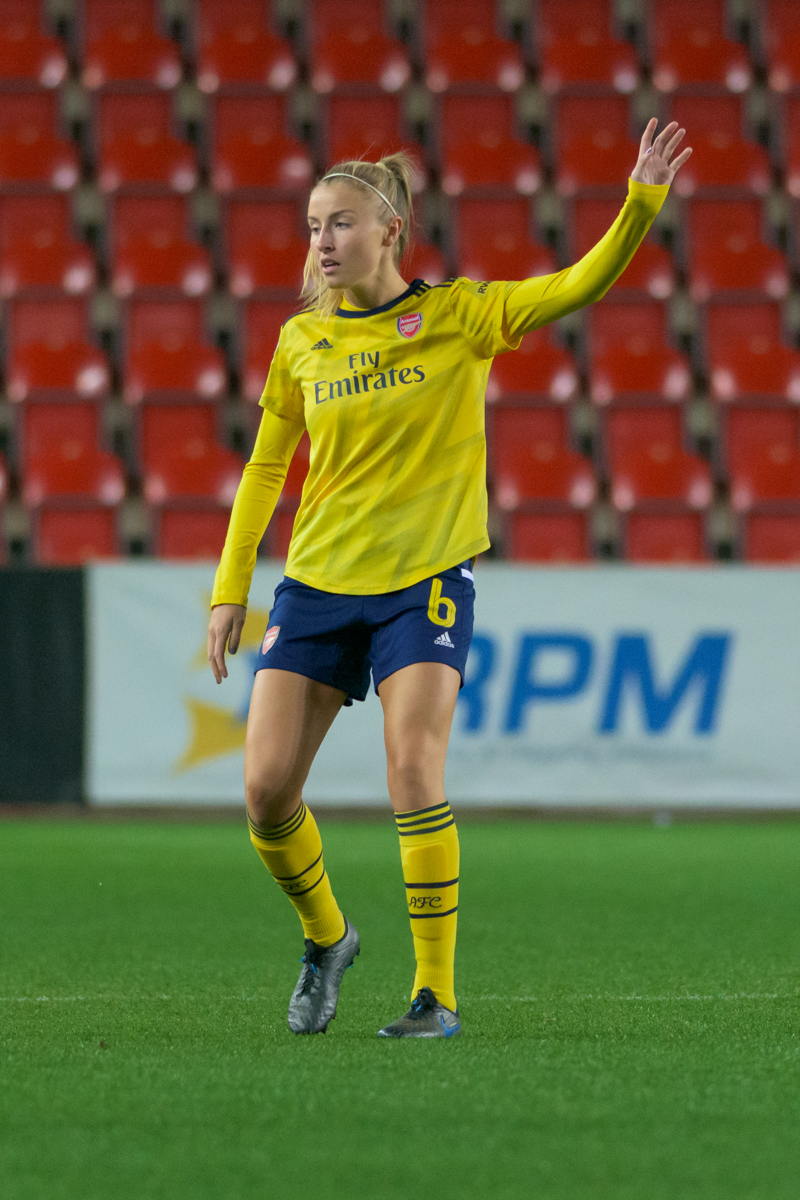
Footballer – Leah Williamson

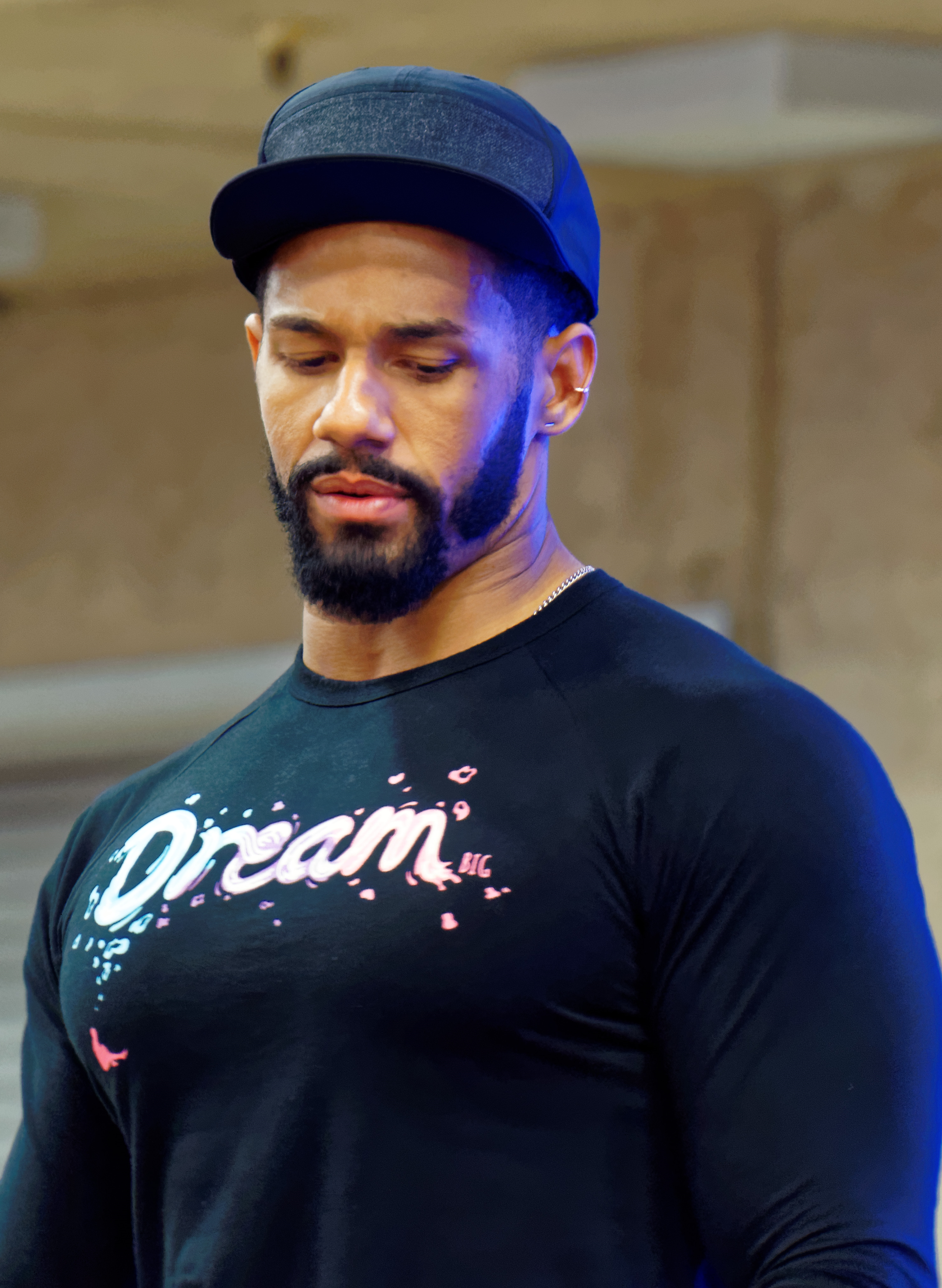
Professional wrestler – Darren Young

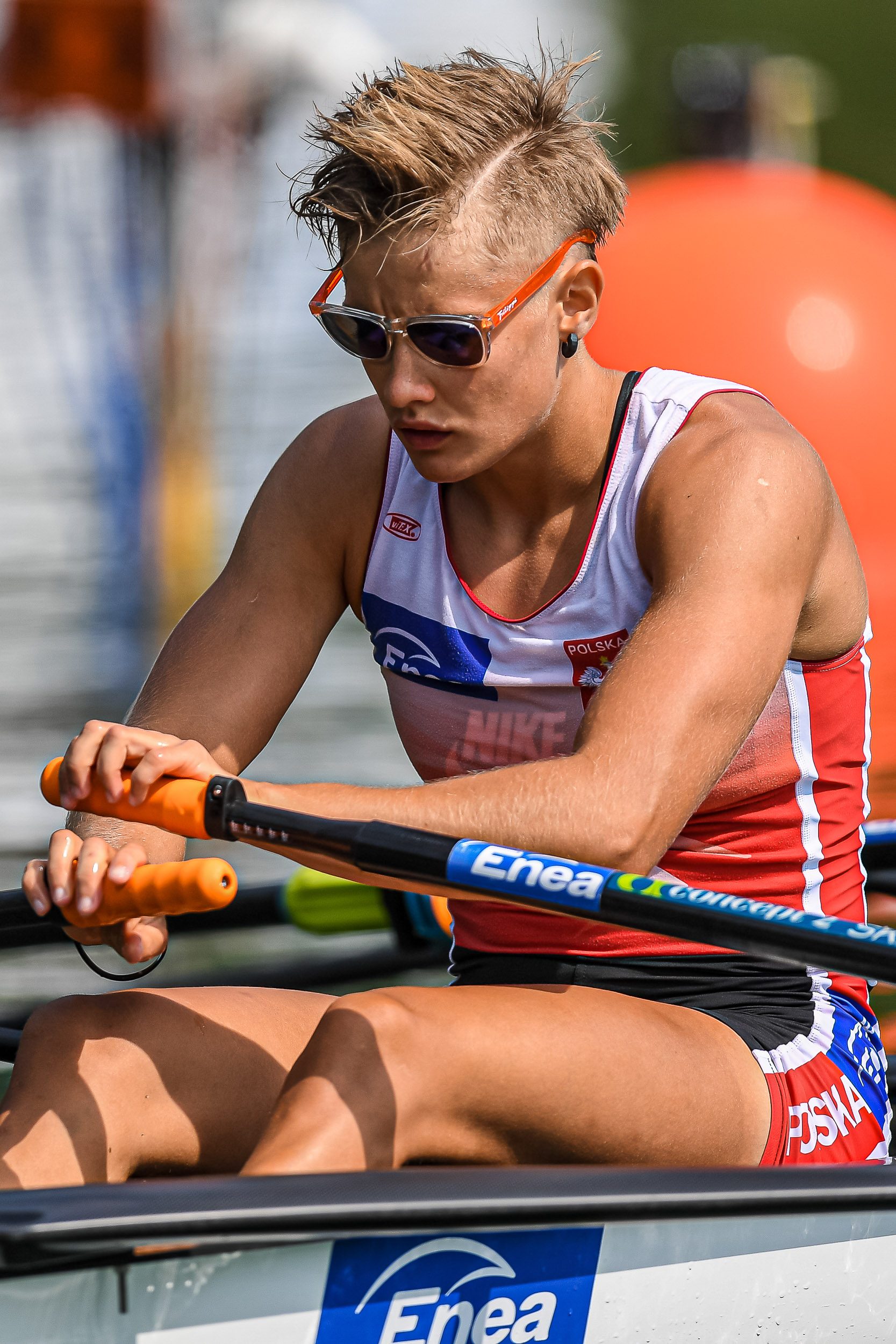
Rower – Katarzyna Zillmann

Name	Lifetime	Country	Sport	Sexual orientation and/or gender identity
Laura Aarts	b. 1996	Netherlands	Waterpolo	Lesbian
Helena Åberg	b. 1971	Sweden	Swimming	Lesbian
Graham Ackerman	b. 1983	United States	Gymnastics	Gay
Nicola Adams	b. 1982	United Kingdom	Boxing	Lesbian
Adriana	b. 1996	Brazil	Association football	Lesbian
Marilyn Agliotti	b. 1979	Netherlands	Field hockey	Lesbian
Michelle-Lee Ahye	b. 1992	Trinidad and Tobago	Track and field	Lesbian
Jenny Allard	b. 1968	United States	Softball	Lesbian
Kye Allums	b. 1989	United States	Basketball	Transgender
John Amaechi	b. 1970	United Kingdom	Basketball	Gay
Erin Ambrose	b. 1994	Canada	Ice hockey	Lesbian
Filippo Ambrosini	b. 1993	Italy	Figure skating	Gay
Brian Anderson	b. 1976	United States	Skateboarding	Gay
Eric Anderson	b. 1968	United States	Coach	Gay
Ivana Andrés	b. 1994	Spain	Association football	Lesbian
Ramsey Angela	b. 1999	Netherlands	Track and field	Gay
Filippa Angeldahl	b. 1997	Sweden	Association football	Lesbian
Nadine Angerer	b. 1978	Germany	Association football	Bisexual
Alyson Annan	b. 1973	Australia	Field hockey	Lesbian
Tahnai Annis	b. 1989	Philippines	Association football	Queer
Kelly Applebee	b. 1982	Australia	Cricket	Lesbian
Gillian Apps	b. 1983	Canada	Ice hockey	Lesbian
Jen Armbruster	b. 1975	United States	Goalball	Lesbian
Rebekka Armstrong	b. 1967	United States	Professional bodybuilding	Bisexual
Judith Arndt	b. 1976	Germany	Cycling	Lesbian
Anita Asante	b. 1985	United Kingdom	Association football	Lesbian
Asuka	b. 1998	Japan	Professional wrestling	Genderless
Davis Atkin	b. 2001	Australia	Field hockey	Gay
Jake Atlas	b. 1994	United States	Professional wrestling	Gay
Zeb Atlas	b. 1970	United States	Professional bodybuilding	Bisexual
Amy Atwell	b. 1998	United States	Basketball	Lesbian
Seimone Augustus	b. 1984	United States	Basketball	Lesbian
Rosella Ayane	b. 1996	United Kingdom	Association football	Lesbian
Kévin Aymoz	b. 1997	France	Figure skating	Gay
Ramona Bachmann	b. 1990	Switzerland	Association football	Lesbian
Hergie Bacyadan	b. 1994	Philippines	Boxing	Transgender
Mianne Bagger	b. 1966	Denmark	Golf	Transgender
Hobey Baker	1892-1918	United States	Ice hockey	Gay
Clare Balding	b. 1971	United Kingdom	Jockey	Lesbian
Jason Ball	b. 1988	Australia	Australian rules football	Gay
Megan Bankes	b. 1997	Canada	Biathlon	Lesbian
Shawnacy Barber	1994–2024	Canada	Pole vault	Gay
Bárbara Micheline do Monte Barbosa	b. 1988	Brazil	Association football	Lesbian
Jim Barnett	1924–2004	United States	Professional wrestling promoter	Gay
Nicole Bass-Fuchs	1964–2017	United States	Professional bodybuilding Professional wrestling	Bisexual
Hayley Bateup	b. 1980	Australia	ironwoman	Lesbian
Betty Baxter	b. 1952	Canada	Volleyball	Lesbian
Billy Bean	1964–2024	United States	Baseball	Gay
Shelley Beattie	1967–2008	United States	Professional bodybuilding	Bisexual
Thomas Beattie	b. 1986	United Kingdom	Association football	Gay
Jolyn Beer	b. 1994	Germany	Shooting	Lesbian
Mack Beggs	b. 1999	United States	Wrestling	Transgender
Alice Bellandi	b. 1998	Italy	Judo	Lesbian
Perris Benegas	b. 1995	United States	Freestyle BMX	Lesbian
Lorena Benítez	b. 1998	Argentina	Association football, futsal	Lesbian
Ann-Katrin Berger	b. 1990	Germany	Association football	Lesbian
Ebba Berglund	b. 1998	Sweden	Ice hockey	Lesbian
Kajsa Bergqvist	b. 1976	Sweden	Track and field	Bisexual
Thomas Berling	b. 1979	Norway	Association football	Gay
Emily Bessoir	b. 2001	Germany	Basketball	Lesbian
Mike Beuttler	1940–1988	United Kingdom	Motor racing	Gay
John de Bever	b. 1965	Netherlands	Association football	Gay
Mark Bingham	1970–2001	United States	Rugby	Gay
Sue Bird	b. 1980	United States	Basketball	Lesbian
Nathalie Björn	b. 1997	Sweden	Association football	Lesbian
Alex Blackwell	b. 1983	Australia	Cricket	Lesbian
John Blankenstein	1949–2006	Netherlands	Association football	Gay
Carl Blasco	b. 1971	France	Triathlon	Gay
Miriam Blasco	b. 1963	Spain	Judo	Lesbian
Andrew Blaser	b. 1989	United States	Skeleton	Gay
Lucilla Boari	b. 1997	Italy	Archery	Lesbian
Lisa Boattin	b. 1997	Italy	Association football	Lesbian
Brian Boitano	b. 1963	United States	Figure skating	Gay
Nicole Bonamino	b. 1991	Italy	Ice hockey	Lesbian
Heinz Bonn	1947–1991	Germany	Association football	Gay
Tom Bosworth	b. 1990	United Kingdom	Racewalking	Gay
Brittany Bowe	b. 1988	United States	Speed skating	Lesbian
Anthony Bowens	b. 1990	United States	Professional wrestling	Gay
Kiara Bowers	b. 1991	Australia	Australian rules football	Lesbian
Celia Brackenridge	1950–2018	United Kingdom	British Lacrosse Player	Lesbian
Sabine Braun	b. 1965	Germany	Track and field	Lesbian
Kelly Brazier	b. 1989	New Zealand	Rugby	Lesbian
Ashleigh Brazill	b. 1989	Australia	Netball	Lesbian
Andy Brennan	b. 1993	Australia	Association football	Gay
Linda Bresonik	b. 1983	Germany	Association football	Lesbian
Belle Brockhoff	b. 1993	Australia	Snowboard	Lesbian
Lucy Bronze	b. 1991	United Kingdom	Association football	Lesbian
Giorgia Bronzini	b. 1983	Italy	Cycling	Lesbian
Gayle Broughton	b. 1996	New Zealand	Rugby	Lesbian
Jason Brown	b. 1994	United States	Figure skating	Gay
Panama Al Brown	1902–1951	Panama	Boxing	Gay
Harrison Browne	b. 1993	Canada	Ice hockey	Transgender
Svenja Brunckhorst	b. 1991	Germany	Basketball	Lesbian
Rachele Bruni	b. 1990	Italy	Swimming	Lesbian
Katherine Brunt	b. 1985	United Kingdom	Cricket	Lesbian
Dorien Bryant	b. 1985	United States	American football	Gay
Kadeisha Buchanan	b. 1995	Canada	Association football	Lesbian
Amandine Buchard	b. 1995	France	Judo	Lesbian
Steve Buckley	b. 1956	United States	Journalist	Gay
Anastasia Bucsis	b. 1989	Canada	Speed skating	Lesbian
Saskia Budgett	b. 1996	United Kingdom	Rowing	Lesbian
Brendan Burke	1988–2010	United States	Ice hockey	Gay
Glenn Burke	1952–1995	United States	Baseball	Gay
Jenna Burkert	b. 1993	United States	Wrestling	Lesbian
Kris Burley	b. 1974	Canada	Gymnastics	Gay
Savannah Burton	b. ?	Canada	Dodgeball	Transgender
Balian Buschbaum	b. 1980	Germany	Track and field	Transgender
Ivan Bussens	1960–2007	United Kingdom	Water polo	Gay
Jeffrey Buttle	b. 1982	Canada	Figure skating	Gay
Erin Burns	b. 1988	Australia	Cricket	Lesbian
Karin Büttner-Janz	b. 1952	Germany	Gymnastics	Lesbian
Emilie Bydwell	b. 1985	United States	Rugby union	Lesbian
Latasha Byears	b. 1973	United States	Basketball	Lesbian
Caitlin Cahow	b. 1985	United States	Ice hockey	Lesbian
J. P. Calderon	b. 1975	United States	Volleyball	Gay
Marissa Callaghan	b. 1985	United Kingdom	Association football	Lesbian
Christopher Caluza	b. 1990	Philippines	Figure skating	Gay
Jane Campbell	b. 1995	United States	Association football	Lesbian
Ally Carda	b. 1993	United States	Softball	Lesbian
Liz Carmouche	b. 1984	United States	MMA	Lesbian
Alex Carpenter	b. 1994	United States	Ice hockey	Lesbian
Cecilia Carranza	b. 1986	Argentina	Sailing	Lesbian
Joe Carstairs	1900–1993	United Kingdom	Motor racing	Lesbian
Jessica Carter	b. 1997	United Kingdom	Association football	Lesbian
Sherry Cassuto	1957-2016	United States	Rowing	Lesbian
Josh Cavallo	b. 1999	Australia	Association football	Gay
Timo Cavelius	b. 1999	Germany	Judo	Gay
Matt Cecchin	b. 1973	Australia	Rugby league	Gay
Isadora Cerullo	b. 1991	Brazil	Rugby	Lesbian
Dutee Chand	b. 1996	India	Sprinting	Lesbian
Parinya Charoenphol	b. 1981	Thailand	Boxing	Transgender
Amanda Chidester	b. 1990	United States	Softball	Lesbian
James Child	b. 1983	United Kingdom	Rugby league referee	Gay
Julie Chu	b. 1982	United States	Ice hockey	Lesbian
Guillaume Cizeron	b. 1994	France	Figure skating	Gay
Emily Clark	b. 1995	Canada	Ice hockey	Lesbian
Michael B. Clark	b. 1973	United States	Professional bodybuilding	Gay
Dominic Clarke	b. 1997	Australia	Trampolining	Gay
Piepa Cleary	b. 1996	Australia	Cricket	Lesbian
Kerron Clement	b. 1985	Trinidad and Tobago	Track and field	Gay
Laura Clemesha	b. 1992	Australia	Netball	Lesbian
Mia-Rae Clifford	b. 1986	Australia	Australian rules football	Lesbian
Natasha Cloud	b. 1992	United States	Basketball	Bisexual
Dennis Coi	1961–1987	Canada	Figure Skating	Gay
Jason Collins	b. 1978	United States	Basketball	Gay
Sean Conroy	b. 1992	United States	Baseball	Gay
Casey Conway	b. 1985	Australia	Rugby	Gay
Natalie Cook	b. 1975	Australia	Beach volleyball	Lesbian
Jodie Cooper	b. 1964	Australia	Surfing	Lesbian
Kahleah Copper	b. 1994	United States	Basketball	Lesbian
Rose Cossar	b. 1991	Canada	Gymnastics	Lesbian
Robin Cousins	b. 1957	United Kingdom	Figure Skating	Gay
Roberta Cowell	1918–2011	United Kingdom	Motor racing	Transgender
Sarah Coyte	b. 1991	Australia	Cricket	Lesbian
Gottfried von Cramm	1909–1976	Germany	Tennis	Bisexual
Scott Cranham	b. 1954	Canada	Diving	Gay
Toller Cranston	1949–2015	Canada	Figure skating	Bisexual
Lisa Cross	b. 1978	United Kingdom	Professional bodybuilding	Bisexual
Orlando Cruz	b. 1981	Puerto Rico	Boxing	Gay
Penny Cula-Reid	b. 1988	Australia	Australian rules football	Lesbian
Ana Marcela Cunha	b. 1992	Brazil	Swimming	Lesbian
John Curry	1949–1994	United Kingdom	Figure skating	Gay
Dónal Óg Cusack	b. 1977	Ireland	Hurling	Gay
Matthew Cusick	b. 1972	United States	Gymnastics	Gay
Søren Dahl	b. 1993	Denmark	Swimming	Gay
Lisa Dahlkvist	b. 1987	Sweden	Association football	Lesbian
Tom Daley	b. 1994	United Kingdom	Diving	Gay/Queer
Rachel Daly	b. 1991	United Kingdom	Association football	Lesbian
Jake Daniels	b. 2005	United Kingdom	Association football	Gay
Mélodie Daoust	b. 1992	Canada	Ice hockey	Lesbian
Tierna Davidson	b. 1998	United States	Association football	Lesbian
Steven Davies	b. 1986	United Kingdom	Cricket	Gay
Liam Davis	b. 1990	United Kingdom	Association football	Gay
Wade Davis	b. 1977	United States	American football	Gay
Brianna Davey	b. 1996	Australia	Association football	Lesbian
Chantal de Bruijn	b. 1976	Netherlands	Field hockey	Lesbian
Jonathan de Falco	b. 1984	Belgium	Association football	Gay
Anouk Dekker	b. 1986	Netherlands	Association football	Lesbian
Dennis Del Valle	b. 1989	Puerto Rico	Volleyball	Gay
Casey Dellacqua	b. 1985	Australia	Tennis	Lesbian
Elena Delle Donne	b. 1989	United States	Basketball	Lesbian
David Denson	b. 1995	United States	Baseball	Gay
Sonya Deville	b. 1993	United States	Professional wrestling	Lesbian
Abrahm DeVine	b. 1996	United States	Swimming	Gay
Margielyn Didal	b. 1999	Philippines	Skateboarding	Queer
Natalya Diehm	b. 1997	Australia	Cycling	Lesbian
Chris Dickerson	1939-2021	United States	Professional bodybuilding	Gay
Halil İbrahim Dinçdağ	b. 1976	Turkey	Association football referee	Gay
Alex Di Giorgio	b. 1990	Italy	Swimming	Gay
Carlien Dirkse van den Heuvel	b. 1987	Netherlands	Field hockey	Lesbian
Stefanie Dolson	b. 1992	United States	Basketball	Lesbian
Sara Doorsoun	b. 1991	Germany	Association football	Lesbian
Jorge José Emiliano dos Santos	1954–1995	Brazil	Association football referee	Gay
Michael Dos Santos	b. 1983	Brazil	Volleyball	Gay
Robert Dover	b. 1956	United States	Equestrian	Gay
Anton Down-Jenkins	b. 1999	New Zealand	Diving	Gay
Frank Dowsing	1951–1994	United States	American football	Gay
Nancy Drolet	b. 1973	Canada	Ice hockey	Lesbian
Michelle Duff	b. 1939	Canada	Motor racing	Transgender
Christian Duffy	b. 1961	United States	Professional bodybuilding	Bisexual
Meghan Duggan	b. 1987	United States	Ice hockey	Lesbian
Michelle Dumaresq	b. 1970	Canada	Mountain biking	Transgender
Céline Dumerc	b. 1982	France	Basketball	Lesbian
Jenny Duncalf	b. 1982	United Kingdom	Squash	Lesbian
Katie Duncan (née Hoyle)	b. 1988	New Zealand	Association football	Lesbian
Priscilla Duncan	b. 1983	New Zealand	Association football	Lesbian
Abby Dunkin	b. 1995	United States	Wheelchair basketball	Lesbian
Simon Dunn	1987-2023	Australia	Bobsled, rugby	Gay
Imke Duplitzer	b. 1975	Germany	Fencing	Lesbian
Rayan Dutra	b. 2002	Brazil	Trampolining	Bisexual
Dessi Dupuy	b. 1993	Bulgaria	Association football	Lesbian
Abbie Eaton	b. 1992	United Kingdom	Auto racing	Lesbian
Kyra Edwards	b. 1997	United Kingdom	Rowing	Lesbian
Paola Egonu	b. 1998	Italy	Volleyball	Bisexual
Sujitra Ekmongkolpaisarn	b. 1977	Thailand	Badminton	Lesbian
Jason Ellis	b. 1971	Australia	MMA, skateboarding, boxing, truck racing	Bisexual
Jill Ellis	b. 1966	United States	Association football	Lesbian
Bethany England	b. 1994	United Kingdom	Association football	Lesbian
Magdalena Eriksson	b. 1993	Sweden	Association football	Lesbian
Norman Elder	1939–2003	Canada	Equestrian	Gay
John Epping	b. 1983	Canada	Curler	Gay
Lisa Evans	b. 1992	United Kingdom	Association football	Lesbian
Non Evans	b. 1974	United Kingdom	Rugby, judo, weightlifting, freestyle wrestling	Lesbian
Matt Evers	b. 1976	United States	Figure skating	Gay
Jennifer Falk	b. 1993	Sweden	Association football	Lesbian
Janelly Farías	b. 1990	Mexico	Association football	Lesbian
Justin Fashanu	1961–1998	United Kingdom	Association football	Gay
Freda du Faur	1882–1935	Australia	Mountaineering	Lesbian
Reine Feldt	1945–1986	Sweden	Association football	Gay
John Fennell	b. 1995	Canada	Luge	Gay
Fabiano Ferreira	b. 1998	Brazil	Artistic swimming	Gay
Michelle Ferris	b. 1976	Australia	Cyclist	Lesbian
Kendra Fisher	b. 1979	Canada	Ice hockey, Inline hockey	Lesbian
Gigi Fernández	b. 1964	Puerto Rico	Tennis	Lesbian
Lucas Fischer	b. 1990	Switzerland	Gymnastics	Gay
Nilla Fischer	b. 1984	Sweden	Association football	Lesbian
Doris Fitschen	b. 1968–2025	Germany	Association football	Lesbian
Amini Fonua	b. 1989	Tonga	Swimming	Gay
Matthew Forgues	b. 1992	United States	Track and field	Gay
Marc Fortuny	b. 1992	Spain	Judo	Gay
Mark Foster	b. 1970	United Kingdom	Swimming	Gay
Fallon Fox	b. 1975	United States	MMA	Transgender
Larissa Franca	b. 1982	Brazil	Beach volleyball	Lesbian
Adrianna Franch	b. 1990	United States	Association football	Lesbian
Larissa Franklin	b. 1993	Canada	Softball	Lesbian
Sidney Franklin	1903–1976	United States	Bullfighting	Gay
Scott Frantz	b. 1996	United States	American football	Gay
Travon Free	b. 1984/1985	United States	Basketball	Bisexual
Tadd Fujikawa	b. 1991	United States	Golf	Gay
Tracy Gahan	b. 1980	United States	Basketball	Lesbian
Edward Gal	b. 1970	Netherlands	Equestrian	Gay
Rudy Galindo	b. 1969	United States	Figure skating	Gay
Vicky Galindo	b. 1983	United States	Softball	Bisexual
Ed Gallagher	b. 1958–2005	United States	American football	Gay
Aurora Galli	b. 1996	Italy	Association football	Lesbian
Jan-Michael Gambill	b. 1977	United States	Tennis	Gay
Edda Garðarsdóttir	b. 1979	Iceland	Association football	Lesbian
Melanie Garside-Wight	b. 1979	United Kingdom	Association football	Lesbian
Terry Garvin	1937–1998	Canada	Professional wrestling	Gay
Carol Gattaz	b. 1981	Brazil	Volleyball	Lesbian
Ana Carolina da Silva	b. 1991	Brazil	Volleyball	Lesbian
Jane Geddes	b. 1960	United States	Golf	Lesbian
Dylan Geick	b. 1997	United States	Wrestling	Gay/Bisexual
Alan Gendreau	b. 1989	United States	American football	Gay
Makayla Gerken Schofield	b. 1999	United Kingdom	Freestyle skiing	Pansexual
Lewis Gibson	b. 1994	United Kingdom	Figure skating	Gay
Kirsty Gilmour	b. 1993	United Kingdom	Badminton	Lesbian
Manuela Giugliano	b. 1997	Italy	Association football	Lesbian
Amber Glenn	b. 1999	United States	Figure skating	Bisexual
Bec Goddard	b. 1978	Australia	Australian rules football	Lesbian
Bobby Goldsmith	1946–1983	Australia	Swimming	Gay
Andrew Goldstein	b. 1983	United States	Lacrosse	Gay
Sophie de Goede	b. 1999	Canada	Rugby	Lesbian
Mara Gómez	b. 1997	Argentina	Association football	Transgender
Tomás González	b. 1985	Chile	Gymnastics	Gay
Derrick Gordon	b. 1991	United States	Basketball	Gay
LZ Granderson	b. 1972	United States	Journalist	Gay
Maddy Grant	b. 2001	Canada	Rugby	Lesbian
Chelsea Gray	b. 1972	United States	Basketball	Lesbian
Ellia Green	b. 1993	Australia	Rugby union	Transgender
Emile Griffith	1938–2013	United States	Boxing	Bisexual
Lia Grimanis	b. 1971	Canada	Businesswoman	Lesbian
Brittney Griner	b. 1990	United States	Basketball	Lesbian
Inka Grings	b. 1978	Germany	Association football	Bisexual
Rachael Grinham	b. 1977	Australia	Squash	Lesbian
Barbara Guarischi	b. 1990	Italy	Cycling	Lesbian
Joan Guetschow	b. 1966	Australia	Biathlon	Lesbian
Trina Gulliver	b. 1969	United Kingdom	Darts	Lesbian
Michael Gunning	b. 1994	Jamaica	Swimming	Gay
Víctor Gutiérrez	b. 1991	Spain	Water polo	Gay
Darcy Guttridge	b. 1999	Australia	Australian rules football	Lesbian
Astrid Guyart	b. 1983	France	Fencing	Lesbian
Tom Harald Hagen	b. 1978	Norway	Association football referee	Gay
Peter Häggström	b. 1976	Sweden	Track and field	Gay
Michi Halilović	b. 1983	Germany	Skeleton	Gay
Matthew Hall	b. 1970	Canada	Figure skating	Gay
Alain Hamer	b. 1965	Luxembourg	Association football referee	Gay
Jude Hamer	b. 1990	United Kingdom	Wheelchair basketball	Lesbian
Gro Hammerseng	b. 1980	Norway	Handball	Lesbian
Nicola Hancock	b. 1995	Australia	Cricket	Lesbian
Alan Hansford	b. 1968	United Kingdom	Cricket	Gay
Pernille Harder	b. 1992	Denmark	Association football	Lesbian
Kellie Harrington	b. 1989	Ireland	Boxing	Lesbian
Ashlyn Harris	b. 1985	United States	Association football	Lesbian
Kwame Harris	b. 1982	United States	American football	Gay
Todd Harrity	b. 1990	United States	Squash	Gay
Naomi Hartley	b. 2001	United Kingdom	Association football	Lesbian
Kyle Hawkins	b. 1970	United States	Lacrosse	Gay
Bruce Hayes	b. 1963	United States	Swimming	Gay
Sandra Haynie	b. 1943	United States	Golf	Lesbian
Hurley Haywood	b. 1948	United States	Motor racing	Gay
Tobin Heath	b. 1988	United States	Association football	Lesbian
Jayna Hefford	b. 1977	Canada	Ice hockey	Lesbian
Mathew Helm	b. 1980	Australia	Diving	Gay
Jorik Hendrickx	b. 1992	Belgium	Figure skating	Gay
Gavan Hennigan	b. 1981	Ireland	Extreme Sports	Gay
Bianca Henninger	b. 1990	Mexico	Association football	Lesbian
Isabell Herlovsen	b. 1988	Norway	Association football	Lesbian
Laurie Hernandez	b. 2000	United States	Gymnastics	Lesbian
Carl Hester	b. 1967	United Kingdom	Equestrian	Gay
Michelle Heyman	b. 1988	Australia	Association football	Lesbian
Nikki Hiltz	b. 1994	United States	Track and field	Lesbian, transgender and non-binary
Fredy Hirsch	b. 1916–1944	Germany	Various, incl. gymnastics; sports teacher	Gay
Keegan Hirst	b. 1988	United Kingdom	Rugby	Gay
Thomas Hitzlsperger	b. 1982	Germany	Association football	Gay
Edel Therese Høiseth	b. 1966	Norway	Speed skating	Lesbian
Ursula Holl	b. 1982	Germany	Association football	Lesbian
Kelly Holmes	b. 1970	United Kingdom	Track and field	Lesbian
Erika Holst	b. 1979	Sweden	Ice hockey	Lesbian
Wilhelm von Homburg	1940–2004	Germany	Boxing, professional wrestling	Bisexual
Laurel Hubbard	b. 1978	New Zealand	Weightlifting	Transgender
Angela Hucles	b. 1978	United States	Association football	Lesbian
Karen Hultzer	b. 1965	South Africa	Archery	Lesbian
Corinne Humphreys	b. 1991	United Kingdom	Track and field	Lesbian
Isaac Humphries	b. 1998	Australia	Basketball	Gay
Mia Hundvin	b. 1977	Norway	Handball	Bisexual
Maarten Hurkmans	b. 1997	Netherlands	Rowing	Bisexual
Lina Hurtig	b. 1995	Sweden	Association football	Lesbian
Lisa Hurtig	b. 1987	Sweden	Association football	Lesbian
Svenja Huth	b. 1991	Germany	Association football	Lesbian
Diego Hypólito	b. 1986	Brazil	Gymnastics	Gay
Antonio Hysén	b. 1990	Sweden	Association football	Gay
Facundo Imhoff	b. 1989	Argentina	Volleyball	Gay
Daniela Iraschko-Stolz	b. 1983	Austria	Ski jumping	Lesbian
George Ives	b. 1867–1950	United Kingdom	Cricket	Gay
Veronica Ivy	b. 1982	Canada	Cycling	Transgender
Colin Jackson	b. 1967	United Kingdom	Track and field	Gay
Helen Jacobs	1908–1997	United States	Tennis	Lesbian
Angela James	b. 1964	Canada	Ice hockey	Lesbian
Jakub Jankto	b. 1996	Czech Republic	Association football	Gay
Aleksandra Jarmolińska	b. 1990	Poland	Skeet	Lesbian
Caitlyn Jenner	b. 1949	United States	Decathlon	Transgender
Patrick Jeffrey	b. 1965	United States	Diving	Gay
Brianne Jenner	b.1991	Canada	Ice hockey	Lesbian
Dorte Dalum Jensen	b. 1978	Denmark	Association football	Lesbian
Dan Jervis	b.1996	United Kingdom	Swimming	Gay
Barbara Jezeršek	b. 1986	Slovenia	Cross-country skiing	Lesbian
Juan Antonio Jiménez	b. 1959	Germany	Equestrian	Gay
Glory Johnson	b. 1990	United States	Basketball	Lesbian
Gus Johnston	b. 1979	Australia	Field hockey	Gay
Campbell Johnstone	b. 1980	New Zealand	Rugby	Gay
Rosie Jones	b. 1959	United States	Golf	Lesbian
Steffi Jones	b. 1972	Germany	Association football	Lesbian
Orlando Jordan	b. 1974	United States	Professional wrestling	Bisexual
Natasha Kai	b. 1983	United States	Association football	Lesbian
Chris Kanyon	1970–2010	United States	Professional wrestling	Gay
Maud Kaptheijns	b. 1994	Netherlands	Cyclocross	Lesbian
Marizanne Kapp	b. 1990	South Africa	Cricket	Lesbian
Ebrar Karakurt	b. 2000	Turkey	Volleyball	Lesbian
Peter Karlsson	b. 1966–1995	Sweden	Ice hockey	Gay
Nadezhda Karpova	b. 1995	Russia	Association football	Lesbian
Daria Kasatkina	b. 1997	Australia	Tennis	Lesbian
Kathleen Kauth	b. 1979	United States	Ice hockey	Lesbian
Nicolás Keenan	b. 1997	Argentina	Field hockey	Bisexual
Johan Kenkhuis	b. 1980	Netherlands	Swimming	Gay
Gus Kenworthy	b. 1991	United States	Freestyle skiing	Gay
Sam Kerr	b. 1993	Australia	Association football	Lesbian
Isabel Kerschowski	b. 1988	Germany	Association football	Lesbian
Silvio Kersten	b. 1978	Germany	Professional bodybuilding, weightlifting	Gay
Emma Kete	b. 1987	New Zealand	Association football	Lesbian
Lotte Kiærskou	b. 1975	Denmark	Handball	Lesbian
Billie Jean King	b. 1943	United States	Tennis	Lesbian
Christopher Kinney	b. 1988	United States	Bobsled	Bisexual
Fran Kirby	b. 1993	United Kingdom	Association football	Lesbian
Sandra Kirby	b. 1949	Canada	Rowing	Lesbian
Stine Brun Kjeldaas	b. 1975	Norway	Snowboard	Lesbian
Anna Kjellbin	b. 1994	Sweden	Ice hockey	Lesbian
Ilana Kloss	b. 1956	United States	Tennis	Lesbian
Hilary Knight	b. 1989	United States	Ice Hockey	Queer
Valentina Kogan	b. 1980	Argentina	Handball	Lesbian
Uri Kokia	b. 1981	Israel	Basketball	Gay
Dominik Koll	b. 1984	Austria	Swimming	Gay
David Kopay	b. 1942	United States	American football	Gay
Silja Kosonen	b. 2002	Finland	Track and field	Lesbian
Daniel Kowalski	b. 1975	Australia	Swimming	Gay
Katja Kraus	b. 1970	Germany	Association football	Lesbian
Kelly Kretschman	b. 1979	United States	Softball	Lesbian
Ali Krieger	b. 1984	United States	Association football	Lesbian
Andreas Krieger	b. 1966	Germany	Track and field	Transgender
Janae Marie Kroc	b. 1972	United States	Powerlifting, professional bodybuilding	Transgender, bisexual
Nathalie Kubalski	b. 1993	Germany	Field hockey	Lesbian
Kim Kulig	b. 1990	Germany	Association football	Lesbian
Emma Kullberg	b. 1991	Sweden	Association football	Lesbian
Nataliya Kuznetsova	b. 1991	Russia	Professional bodybuilding, weightlifting	Bisexual
Stephanie Labbé	b. 1986	Canada	Association football	Lesbian
Charline Labonté	b. 1982	Canada	Ice hockey	Lesbian
Alexandra Lacrabère	b. 1987	France	Handball	Lesbian
Kim Lammers	b. 1981	Netherlands	Field hockey	Lesbian
Ghislaine Landry	b. 1988	Canada	Rugby	Lesbian
Jessica Landström	b. 1984	Sweden	Association football	Lesbian
Lauren Lappin	b. 1984	United States	Softball	Lesbian
Lauren	b. 2002	Brazil	Association football	Lesbian
James Michael Lavigne	b. 1963	Canada	Professional bodybuilding	Gay
Mark Leduc	1962–2009	Canada	Boxing	Gay
Timothy LeDuc	b. 1990	United States	Figure skating	Gay, Non-binary
Alisha Lehmann	b. 1999	Switzerland	Association football	Bisexual
Marco Lehmann	b. 1993	Switzerland	Basketball	Gay
Evy Leibfarth	b. 2004	United States	Canoe slalom	Bisexual
Phuti Lekoloane	b. 1992	South Africa	Association football	Gay
Diede Lemey	b. 1996	Belgium	Association football	Lesbian
Emma Lennartsson	b. 1991	Sweden	Association football	Lesbian
Mapi León	b. 1995	Spain	Association football	Lesbian
Malin Levenstad	b. 1988	Sweden	Association football	Lesbian
Danell Leyva	b. 1991	United States	Gymnastics	Bisexual, pansexual
Hedvig Lindahl	b. 1983	Sweden	Association football	Lesbian
Ylva Lindberg	b. 1976	Sweden	Ice hockey	Lesbian
Lori Lindsey	b. 1980	United States	Association football	Lesbian
Elena Linari	b. 1994	Italy	Association football	Lesbian
Matthew Lister	b. 1992	United Kingdom	Canoeing	Gay
Ruesha Littlejohn	b. 1990	Ireland	Association football	Lesbian
Ari-Pekka Liukkonen	b. 1989	Finland	Swimming	Gay
Chester Lockhart	b. 1992	United States	Dancing	Queer
Chloe Logarzo	b. 1994	Australia	Association football	Lesbian
Joanna Lohman	b. 1982	United States	Association football	Lesbian
Lella Lombardi	1941–1992	Italy	Motor racing	Lesbian
Lorena	b. 1997	Brazil	Association football	Lesbian
Greg Louganis	b. 1960	United States	Diving	Gay
Robyn Love	b. 1990	United Kingdom	Wheelchair basketball	Lesbian
Jewell Loyd	b. 1993	United States	Basketball	Lesbian
Tom Luchsinger	b. 1991	United States	Swimming	Gay
Joey Lye	b. 1987	Canada	Softball	Lesbian
Shannon Lynn	b. 1985	United Kingdom	Association football	Lesbian
Frida Maanum	b. 1999	Norway	Association football	Lesbian
Cheryl Maas	b. 1984	Netherlands	Snowboard	Lesbian
Sofía Maccari	b. 1984	Argentina	Field hockey	Lesbian
Yusaf Mack	b. 1980	United States	Boxing	Gay
Jack Mackenroth	b. 1969	United States	Swimming	Gay
Angela Madsen	1960–2020	United States	Rowing, track and field	Lesbian
Liliane Maestrini	b. 1987	Brazil	Beach volleyball	Lesbian
Dalton Maldonado	b. 1995	United States	Basketball	Gay
Hana Mandlíková	b. 1962	Czech Republic	Tennis	Lesbian
Robbie Manson	b. 1989	New Zealand	Rowing	Gay
Karina Manta	b. 1996	United States	Ice dancing	Bisexual
Patricio Manuel	b. 1985	United States	Boxing	Transgender
Arthur Mariano	b. 1993	Brazil	Gymnastics	Gay
Brian Marshall	b. 1965	Canada	High jump	Gay
Marta	b. 1986	Brazil	Association football	Lesbian
Charlie Martin	b. 1981	United Kingdom	Auto Racing	Transgender
Christy Martin	b. 1968	United States	Boxing	Lesbian
Collin Martin	b. 1994	United States	Association football	Gay
Jasmine Martin	b. 2000	South Africa	Judo	Lesbian
Carlo Masi	b. 1976	Italy	Bodybuilding	Gay
Johnny Mathis	b. 1935	United States	Basketball	Gay
Ian Matos	1989-2021	Brazil	Diving	Gay
Amélie Mauresmo	b. 1979	France	Tennis	Lesbian
Stephany Mayor	b. 1991	Mexico	Association football	Bisexual
Marnie McBean	b. 1968	Canada	Rowing	Lesbian
Adam McCabe	b. 1991	United States	Association football	Gay
Katie McCabe	b. 1995	Ireland	Association football	Lesbian
Martha McCabe	b. 1989	Canada	Swimming	Lesbian
Robert McCall	1958–1991	Canada	Figure skating	Gay
Haylie McCleney	b. 1994	United States	Softball	Lesbian
Angel McCoughtry	b. 1986	United States	Association football	Lesbian
Ray McDonald	b. 1944–1993	United States	American football	Gay
Stewart McKinney	1931–1987	United States	Auto racing	Bisexual
Lindsy McLean	b. 1938	United States	American football	Gay
Erin McLeod	b. 1983	Canada	Association football	Lesbian
Beth Mead	b. 1995	United Kingdom	Association football	Lesbian
Linda Medalen	b. 1965	Norway	Association football	Lesbian
Simona Meiler	b. 1989	Switzerland	Snowboard	Lesbian
Ioannis Melissanidis	b. 1977	Greece	Gymnastics	Gay
Rosa Mendes	b. 1979	Canada	Professional wrestling	Bisexual
Alex Mendez	b. 2000	United States	Association football	Aromantic
Conner Mertens	b. 1994/1995	United States	American football	Bisexual
Harriet Metcalf	b. 1958	United States	Rowing	Lesbian
Kristie Mewis	b. 1991	United States	Association football	Lesbian
Kim Meylemans	b. 1996	Belgium	Skeleton	Lesbian
Theresa Michalak	b. 1992	Germany	Swimming	Lesbian
Domien Michiels	b. 1983	Belgium	Equestrian	Gay
Vivianne Miedema	b. 1996	Netherlands	Association football	Lesbian
Linda Mienzer	b. 1965	Bermuda	Cricket	Lesbian
Hans Peter Minderhoud	b. 1973	Netherlands	Equestrian	Gay
Greet Minnen	b. 1997	Belgium	Tennis	Lesbian
Matthew Mitcham	b. 1988	Australia	Diving	Gay
Cameron Mitchell	b. 1973	United States	Professional bodybuilding	Bisexual
Eric Mitchell	b. 1992	Canada	Ski jumping	Gay
Renee Montgomery	b. 1986	United States	Basketball	Lesbian
Tara Moore	b. 1992	United Kingdom	Tennis	Lesbian
Chris Morgan	b. 1973	United Kingdom	Powerlifting	Gay
Carolina Morace	b. 1964	Italy	Association football	Lesbian
Jim Morris	b. 1936–2016	United States	Professional bodybuilding	Gay
Chris Mosier	b. 1980	United States	Triathlon	Transgender
Gili Mossinson	b. 1978	Israel	Basketball	Bisexual
Bruce Mouat	b. 1994	United Kingdom	Curling	Gay
Hannah Mouncey	b. 1989	Australia	Handball, Australian rules football	Transgender, Lesbian
Valerie Mulcahy	b. 1983	Ireland	Gaelic football	Lesbian
Nadine Müller	b. 1985	Germany	Discus throw	Lesbian
Nina Müller	b. 1980	Germany	Handball	Lesbian
Susann Müller	b. 1988	Germany	Handball	Lesbian
Sandra Näslund	b. 1996	Sweden	Freestyle skiing	Lesbian
Christine Nairn	b. 1990	United States	Association football	Lesbian
Carl Nassib	b. 1993	United States	American football	Gay
Martina Navratilova	b. 1956	Czech Republic	Tennis	Lesbian
Guillermina Naya	b. 1996	Argentina	Tennis	Lesbian
Ondrej Nepela	1951–1989	Slovakia	Figure skating	Gay
Robert Newton	b. 1981	United Kingdom	Track and field	Gay
Cindy Ngamba	b. 1998	Cameroon	Boxing	Lesbian
Jordan Nobbs	b. 1992	United Kingdom	Association football	Lesbian
Bente Nordby	b. 1974	Norway	Association football	Lesbian
Scott Norton	b. 1982	United States	Bowling	Gay
Jana Novotná	1968–2017	Czech Republic	Tennis	Lesbian
Tegan Nox	b. 1994	United Kingdom	Professional wrestling	Bisexual
Yared Nuguse	b. 1999	United States	Track and field	Gay
Diana Nyad	b. 1949	United States	Swimming	Lesbian
Katja Nyberg	b. 1979	Sweden	Handball	Lesbian
Amanda Nunes	b. 1988	Brazil	MMA	Lesbian
Nina Nunes	b. 1985	United States	MMA	Lesbian
Graeme Obree	b. 1965	United Kingdom	Cycling	Gay
Ryan O'Callaghan	b. 1983	United States	American football	Gay
Jolanta Ogar	b. 1982	Poland	Sailing	Lesbian
Kelley O'Hara	b. 1988	United States	Association football	Lesbian
Inger Pors Olsen	b. 1966	Denmark	Rowing	Lesbian
Paul O'Brien	b. 1968	New Zealand	Horse riding	Gay
Ryan O'Meara	b. 1984	United States	Ice dancing	Gay
Curdin Orlik	b. 1993	Switzerland	Professional wrestling	Gay
Brian Orser	b. 1961	Canada	Figure skating	Gay
Kanako Otsuji	b. 1974	Japan	Karate, Taekwondo	Lesbian
Caroline Ouellette	b. 1979	Canada	Ice hockey	Lesbian
Nigel Owens	b. 1971	United Kingdom	Rugby referee	Gay
Matt Pacifici	b. 1993	United States	Association football	Gay
Robert Páez	b. 1994	Venezuela	Diving	Gay
Dave Pallone	b. 1951	United States	Baseball	Gay
Dan Palmer	b. 1988	Australia	Rugby	Gay
Šárka Pančochová	b. 1990	Czech Republic	Snowboard	Lesbian
Bob Paris	b. 1959	Canada	Professional bodybuilding	Gay
Sandy Parker	b. 1952	Canada	Professional wrestling	Lesbian
Lily Parr	1905–1978	United Kingdom	Association football	Lesbian
Anja Pärson	b. 1981	Sweden	Downhill skiing	Lesbian
Pat Patterson	1941–2020	Canada	Professional wrestling	Gay
Maartje Paumen	b. 1985	Netherlands	Field hockey	Lesbian
Lee Pearson	b. 1974	United Kingdom	Equestrian	Gay
Christinna Pedersen	b. 1986	Denmark	Badminton	Lesbian
Otto Peltzer	1900–1970	Germany	Track and field	Gay
Mike Penner	1957–2009	United States	Journalist	Transgender
Carlos Peralta	b. 1994	Spain	Swimming	Gay
María Pérez	b. 1996	Spain	Track and field	Lesbian
Nesthy Petecio	b. 1992	Philippines	Boxing	Lesbian
Babett Peter	b. 1988	Germany	Association football	Lesbian
Alexis Peterson	b. 1995	Germany	Basketball	Lesbian
Pauline Peyraud-Magnin	b. 1992	France	Association football	Lesbian
Beate Peters	b. 1959	Germany	Track and field	Lesbian
Erin Phillips	b. 1985	Australia	Basketball, Australian rules football	Lesbian
David Pichler	b. 1968	United States	Diving	Gay
Fernanda Pinilla	b. 1993	Chile	Association football	Lesbian
Aslie Pitter	b. 1960	United Kingdom	Association football	Gay
Jessica Platt	b. 1989	Canada	Ice hockey	Transgender
Brian Pockar	1959–1992	Canada	Figure skating	Gay
Nadia Podoroska	b. 1997	Argentina	Tennis	Lesbian
Paul Poirier	b. 1991	Canada	Figure skating	Gay
Ish Polvorosa	b. 1997	Philippines	Volleyball	Queer
Marie-Philip Poulin	b. 1991	Canada	Ice Hockey	Lesbian
Hope Powell	b. 1966	United Kingdom	Association football	Lesbian
Natalie Powell	b. 1990	United Kingdom	Judo	Lesbian
Lauren Powers	b. 1961	United States	Professional bodybuilding	Bisexual
Christen Press	b. 1988	United States	Association football	Lesbian
Chucky Preston	b. 1988	United Kingdom	Snooker	Lesbian
Lauren Price	b. 1994	United Kingdom	Boxing	Lesbian
Peter Prijdekker	b. 1948	Netherlands	Swimming	Gay
Sedona Prince	b. 2000	United States	Basketball	Lesbian
Bev Priestman	b. 1986	United Kingdom	Association football	Lesbian
Luke Prokop	b. 2002	Canada	Ice hockey	Gay
Simon Proulx-Sénécal	b. 1991	Canada	Figure skating	Gay
Mike Pucillo	b. 1986	United States	Professional wrestling	Gay
Janne Puhakka	1995–2024	Finland	Ice hockey	Gay
Allie Quigley	b. 1986	Hungary	Basketball	Lesbian
Quinn	b. 1995	Canada	Association football	Non-binary
Jocelyn Rae	b. 1991	United Kingdom	Tennis	Lesbian
Eric Radford	b. 1985	Canada	Figure skating	Gay
Chelsea Randall	b. 1991	Australia	Football Australia	Lesbian
Rūta Meilutytė	b. 1997	Lithuania	Swimming	Bisexual
Megan Rapinoe	b. 1985	United States	Association football	Lesbian
Jamie Lee Rattray	b. 1992	Canada	Ice hockey	Lesbian
Felicitas Rauch	b. 1996	Germany	Association football	Lesbian
Javier Raya	b. 1991	Spain	Figure skating	Gay
Lisa Raymond	b. 1973	United States	Tennis	Lesbian
Stephen Rhodes	b. 1984	United States	Motor racing	Gay
Renée Richards	b. 1934	United States	Tennis	Transgender
Helen Richardson-Walsh	b. 1981	United Kingdom	Field hockey	Lesbian
Kate Richardson-Walsh	b. 1980	United Kingdom	Field hockey	Lesbian
Sha'Carri Richardson	b. 2000	United States	Track and field	Bisexual
Lucia Rijker	b. 1967	Netherlands	Kickboxing	Bisexual
Adam Rippon	b. 1989	United States	Figure skating	Gay
Hig Roberts	b. 1991	United States	Giant slalom	Gay
Ian Roberts	b. 1965	Australia	Rugby league	Gay
Dustin Robertson	b. 1975	United States	Professional bodybuilding	Gay
Ronald Robertson	1937–2000	United States	Figure skating	Gay
Robbie Rogers	b. 1987	United States	Association football	Gay
Craig Rogerson	b. 1965	Australia	Diving	Gay
Jeff Rohrer	b. 1958	United States	American football	Gay
Yulimar Rojas	b. 1995	Venezuela	Track and field	Lesbian
Ana Romero	b. 1987	Spain	Association football	Lesbian
Nyla Rose	b. 1982	United States	Professional wrestling	Transgender
Petra Rossner	b. 1966	Germany	Cycling	Lesbian
Devon Rouse	b. 1998	United States	Motor racing	Gay
Olivier Rouyer	b. 1955	France	Association football	Gay
Stephanie Rovetti	b. 1991	United States	Rugby Sevens	Lesbian
Lauren Rowles	b. 1998	United Kingdom	Pararowing	Lesbian
Paul Ruggeri	b. 1988	United States	Gymnastic	Gay
Javier Ruisanchez	b. 1997	Puerto Rico	Artistic swimming	Gay
Matthew Rush	b. 1972	United States	Professional bodybuilding	Gay
Ryan Russell	b. 1992	United States	American football	Bisexual
Kamilla Rytter Juhl	b. 1983	Denmark	Badminton	Lesbian
Martina Sáblíková	b. 1987	Czech Republic	Speed skating	Lesbian
Jaiyah Saelua	b. 1988	American Samoa	Association football	Transgender
Senni Salminen	b. 1996	Finland	Track and field	Lesbian
Angela Salvagno	b. 1976	United States	Professional bodybuilding	Bisexual
Michael Sam	b. 1990	United States	American football	Gay
Macarena Sánchez	b. 1991	Argentina	Association football	Lesbian
Victoria Sandell Svensson	b. 1977	Sweden	Association football	Lesbian
Lianne Sanderson	b. 1988	United Kingdom	Association football	Lesbian
Ilaria Sanguineti	b. 1994	Italy	Cycling	Lesbian
Chip Sarafin	b. ?	United States	American football	Gay
Enrique Sarasola Jr.	b. 1963	Spain	Equestrian	Gay
Jill Saulnier	b. 1992	Canada	Ice hockey	Lesbian
Ronja Savolainen	b. 1997	Finland	Ice hockey	Lesbian
Tabea Schendekehl	b. 1998	Germany	Rowing	Lesbian
Erik Schinegger	b. 1948	Austria	Downhill skiing	Transgender
Lea Schüller	b. 1997	Germany	Association football	Lesbian
Ralf Schumacher	b. 1975	Germany	Auto Racing	Bisexual
Megan Schutt	b. 1993	Australia	Cricket	Lesbian
Nat Sciver	b. 1992	United Kingdom	Cricket	Lesbian
Dale Scott	b. 1959	United States	Baseball	Gay
Jill Scott	b. 1987	United Kingdom	Association football	Lesbian
Lauren Scruggs	b. 2003	United States	Fencing	Lesbian
Caroline Seger	b. 1985	Sweden	Association football	Lesbian
Guenter Seidel	b. 1960	Germany	Equestrian	Gay
Linda Sembrant	b. 1987	Sweden	Association football	Lesbian
Caster Semenya	b. 1991	South Africa	Track and field	Lesbian, Intersex
Alena Sharp	b. 1981	Canada	Golf	Lesbian
Patty Sheehan	b. 1956	United States	Golf	Lesbian
Kailen Sheridan	b. 1995	Canada	Association football	Lesbian
Will Sheridan	b. 1985	United States	Basketball	Gay
Kate Shierlaw	b. 1989	Australia	Australian rules football	Lesbian
Bianca Sierra	b. 1992	Mexico	Association football	Bisexual
Sandra Sigurðardóttir	b. 1986	Iceland	Association football	Lesbian
Jackie Silva	b. 1962	Brazil	Beach volleyball	Lesbian
Rafaela Silva	b. 1992	Brazil	Judo	Lesbian
Nicole Silveira	b. 1994	Brazil	Skeleton	Lesbian
Eudy Simelane	1977–2008	South Africa	Association football	Lesbian
Georgia Simmerling	b. 1989	Canada	Track cycling	Lesbian
Roy Simmons	1956–2014	United States	American football	Gay
Brian Sims	b. 1978	United States	American football	Gay
Johan Jimmy Sjödin	b. 1977	Sweden	Diving	Gay
Yasmin Skene	b. 1998	Australia	Floorball	Gay
Blake Skjellerup	b. 1985	New Zealand	Speed skating	Gay
Vibeke Skofterud	1980–2018	Norway	Cross-country skiing	Bisexual
Katarzyna Skorupa	b. 1984	Poland	Volleyball	Lesbian
Rikke Skov	b. 1980	Denmark	Handball	Lesbian
Rivallino Sleur	b. 1976	Netherlands	Association football	Gay
Alana Smith	b. 2000	United States	Skateboarding	Bisexual and non-binary
Jerry Smith	1943–1986	United States	American football	Bisexual
Emilce Sosa	b. 1987	Argentina	Volleyball	Lesbian
Lia Smith	2004–2025	United States	Diving	Transgender
Douglas Souza	b. 1995	Brazil	Volleyball	Gay
Laís Souza	b. 1988	Brazil	Skiing	Lesbian
Judy Sowinski	1940–2011	United States	Roller derby	Lesbian
Muffin Spencer-Devlin	b. 1953	United States	Golf	Lesbian
Sherida Spitse	b. 1990	Netherlands	Association football	Lesbian
Laura Stacey	b. 1994	Canada	Ice Hockey	Lesbian
Marianne Steinbrecher	b. 1983	Brazil	Volleyball	Lesbian
Helen Stephens	1918–1994	United States	Track and field	Lesbian
James Stephanie Sterling	b. 1984	United Kingdom	Wrestler	Non-binary and Pansexual
Breanna Stewart	b. 1994	United States	Basketball	Lesbian
Samantha Stewart	b. 1989	Canada	Wrestling	Lesbian
Demi Stokes	b. 1991	United Kingdom	Association football	Lesbian
Casey Stoney	b. 1982	United Kingdom	Association football	Lesbian
Beth Storry	b. 1978	United Kingdom	Field hockey	Lesbian
Samantha Stosur	b. 1984	Australia	Tennis	Lesbian
Jérémy Stravius	b. 1988	France	Swimming	Gay
Luke Strong	b. 1993	United Kingdom	Trampolining	Bisexual
Martina Strutz	b. 1981	Germany	Track and field	Lesbian
Rennae Stubbs	b. 1971	Australia	Tennis	Lesbian
Tricia Stumpf	b. 1970	United States	Skeleton	Lesbian
Erica Sullivan	b. 2000	United States	Swimming	Lesbian
Zach Sullivan	b. 1994	United Kingdom	Ice hockey	Bisexual
Pia Sundhage	b. 1960	Sweden	Association football	Lesbian
Jan Švub	b. 1982	Czech Republic	Professional bodybuilding	Gay
Emma Swanson	b. 1995	Australia	Australian rules football	Lesbian
Stacy Sykora	b. 1977	United States	Volleyball	Lesbian
Tainá	b. 1995	Brazil	Association football	Lesbian
Blyth Tait	b. 1961	New Zealand	Equestrian	Gay
Nanae Takizawa	b. 1987	Japan	Volleyball	Lesbian
Connor Taras	b. ?	Canada	Kayak	Gay
Tarciane	b. 2003	Brazil	Association football	Lesbian
Diana Taurasi	b. 1982	United States	Basketball	Lesbian
Jodie Taylor	b. 1986	United Kingdom	Association football	Lesbian
Penny Taylor	b. 1981	Australia	Basketball	Lesbian
Irma Testa	b. 1997	Italy	Boxer	Queer
David Testo	b. 1981	United States	Association football	Gay
Ina-Yoko Teutenberg	b. 1974	Germany	Cycling	Lesbian
Mark Tewksbury	b. 1968	Canada	Swimming	Gay
Carole Thate	b. 1971	Netherlands	Field hockey	Lesbian
Alyssa Thomas	b. 1992	United States	Basketball	Lesbian
Gareth Thomas	b. 1974	United Kingdom	Rugby	Gay
Kristen Thomas	b. 1993	United States	Rugby	Lesbian
Lia Thomas	b. 1999	United States	Swimming	Transgender
Markus Thormeyer	b. 1997	Canada	Swimming	Gay
Ian Thorpe	b. 1982	Australia	Swimming	Gay
Heath Thorpe	b. 2000	Australia	Gymnastics	Gay
Bill Tilden	1893–1953	United States	Tennis	Gay
Ted Tinling	1910–1990	United Kingdom	Tennis	Gay
Jesús Tomillero	b. 1994	Spain	Association football referee	Gay
Susannah Townsend	b. 1989	United Kingdom	Field hockey	Lesbian
Jeffrey Trammell	b. 1950	United States	Basketball	Gay
Emma Trott	b. 1989	United Kingdom	Cycling	Lesbian
Esera Tuaolo	b. 1968	United States	American football	Gay
Gabbi Tuft	b. 1978	United States	Professional wrestling	Transgender
Ruby Tui	b. 1991	New Zealand	Rugby	Lesbian
Marc Tur	b. 1994	Spain	Race walking	Gay
Emma Twigg	b. 1987	New Zealand	Rowing	Lesbian
Colton Underwood	b. 1992	United States	American football	Gay
Marcus Urban	b. 1971	Germany	Association football	Gay
Lara Vadlau	b. 1994	Austria	Sailing	Lesbian
Brian Vahaly	b. 1979	United States	Tennis	Gay
Sarah Vaillancourt	b. 1985	Canada	Ice hockey	Lesbian
Daniëlle van de Donk	b. 1991	Netherlands	Association football	Lesbian
Stefanie van der Gragt	b. 1992	Netherlands	Association football	Lesbian
Sanne van Dijke	b. 1995	Netherlands	Judo	Lesbian
Merel van Dongen	b. 1993	Netherlands	Association football	Lesbian
Michele Van Gorp	b. 1977	United States	Basketball	Lesbian
Sanne van Kerkhof	b. 1987	Netherlands	Speed skating	Lesbian
Ella Van Kerkhoven	b. 1993	Belgium	Association football	Lesbian
Dane van Niekerk	b. 1993	South Africa	Cricket	Lesbian
Alison Van Uytvanck	b. 1994	Belgium	Tennis	Lesbian
Courtney Vandersloot	b. 1989	Hungary	Basketball	Lesbian
Júlia Vasconcelos	b. 1992	Brazil	Taekwondo	Lesbian
Laura Vasilescu	b. 1984	Romania	Handball	Lesbian
Dan Veatch	b. 1965	United States	Swimming	Gay
Anne Veenendaal	b. 1995	Netherlands	Field hockey	Lesbian
Sebastián Vega	b. 1988	Argentina	Basketball	Gay
Julian Venonsky	b. 1993	United States	Rowing	Gay
Sophie Vercruyssen	b. 1992	Belgium	Bobsleigh	Lesbian
Mike Verschuur	b. 1987	Netherlands	Motor racing	Gay
Johnmar "OhMyV33Nus" Villaluna	b. 1994	Philippines	Esports	Queer
Ólína Guðbjörg Viðarsdóttir	b. 1982	Iceland	Association football	Lesbian
Linda Villumsen	b. 1985	New Zealand	Cycling	Lesbian
Lisa-Marie Vizaniari	b. 1971	Australia	Track and field, boxing	Lesbian
Marianne Vos	b. 1987	Netherlands	Cycling	Lesbian
Chris Voth	b. 1990	Canada	Indoor volleyball	Gay
Tom Waddell	1937–1987	United States	Decathlon; creator of the Gay Games	Gay
Kira Walkenhorst	b. 1990	Germany	Beach volleyball	Lesbian
Jackie Walker	1950–2002	United States	American football	Gay
Louisa Wall	b. 1972	New Zealand	Rugby	Lesbian
Ji Wallace	b. 1977	Australia	Gymnastics	Gay
Michaela Walsh	b. 1993	Ireland	Boxing	Lesbian
Sarah Walsh	b. 1983	Australia	Association football	Lesbian
Abby Wambach	b. 1980	United States	Association football	Lesbian
Jeffrey Wammes	b. 1987	Netherlands	Gymnastics	Gay
Frederic Wandres	b. 1987	Germany	Equestrian	Gay
Haleigh Washington	b. 1995	United States	Volleyball	Bisexual
Danny Watts	b. 1979	United Kingdom	Auto racing	Gay
Kendall Wesenberg	b. 1990	United States	Skeleton	Bisexual
Ann Wauters	b. 1980	Belgium	Basketball	Lesbian
Saskia Webber	b. 1971	United States	Association football	Lesbian
Rowie Webster	b. 1987	Australia	Waterpolo	Lesbian
Johnny Weir	b. 1984	United States	Figure skating	Gay
Rick Welts	b. 1953	United States	Basketball executive	Gay
Peter Wherrett	b. 1936–2009	Australia	Motor racing	Transgender
Diane Whipple	b. 1968–2001	United States	Lacrosse	Lesbian
Sami Whitcomb	b. 1988	United States	Basketball	Lesbian
Sue Wicks	b. 1966	United States	Basketball	Lesbian
Marieke Wijsman	b. 1975	Netherlands	Speed skating	Lesbian
Hannah Wilkinson	b. 1992	New Zealand	Association football	Lesbian
Leah Wilkinson	b. 1986	United Kingdom	Field hockey	Lesbian
Laurie Williams	b.1992	United Kingdom	Wheelchair basketball	Lesbian
Marlon Williams	b. 1988	United States	American football	Bisexual
Nicola Williams	b. 1982	Australia	Association football	Lesbian
Sharni Williams	b. 1988	Australia	Rugby union	Lesbian
Stephanie Williams	b. 1992	United Kingdom	Association football	Lesbian
Leah Williamson	b. 1997	United Kingdom	Association football	Lesbian
David Wilson	b. 1966	Canada	Figure skating	Gay
Spencer Wilton	b. 1973	United Kingdom	Equestrian	Gay
Keelin Winters	b. 1988	United States	Association football	Lesbian
Paul Wirtz	1958–2006	Canada	Figure skating	Gay
Chris Witty	b. 1975	United States	Speed skating	Lesbian
Lara Wolf	b. 2000	Austria	Freestyle Skiing	Lesbian
Jack Woolley	b. 1998	Ireland	Taekwondo athlete	Gay
Andrea Worrall	b. 1977	United Kingdom	Association football	Lesbian
Tyler Wright	b. 1994	Australia	Surfing	Lesbian
Ireen Wüst	b. 1986	Netherlands	Speed skating	Bisexual
Alissa Wykes	b. 1967	United States	American football	Lesbian
Marta Xargay	b. 1990	Spain	Basketball	Lesbian
Kirsty Yallop	b. 1986	New Zealand	Association football	Lesbian
Tameka Yallop (née Butt)	b. 1991	Australia	Association football	Lesbian
Yoko Yamada	b. 1979	Japan	Professional wrestling, MMA	Bisexual
Kumi Yokoyama	b. 1993	Japan	Association football	Transgender
Darren Young	b. 1983	United States	Professional wrestling	Gay
Shelina Zadorsky	b. 1992	Canada	Association football	Lesbian
Babe Didrikson Zaharias	1911–1956	United States	Golf, basketball, baseball, track and field	Bisexual
Micah Zandee-Hart	b. 1997	Canada	Ice hockey	Lesbian
Nikola Zdráhalová	b. 1996	Czech Republic	Speed skating	Lesbian
Julia Zigiotti Olme	b. 1997	Sweden	Association football	Lesbian
Katarzyna Zillmann	b. 1995	Poland	Rowing	Lesbian
Sharnee Zoll-Norman	b. 1986	United States	Basketball	Lesbian
Andrzej Stękała	b. 1995	Poland	Ski Jumping	Gay
Marie-Philip Poulin	b. 1991	Canada	Ice hockey	Lesbian
Laura Stacey	b. 1994	Canada	Ice hockey	Lesbian

== See also ==
- Coming out
- European Gay and Lesbian Sport Federation
- Federation of Gay Games
- Homosexuality in American football
- Homosexuality in association football
- Homosexuality in modern sports
- International Gay and Lesbian Football Association
- List of LGBT Olympians
- List of LGBT Summer Olympians (1896–2000)
- List of LGBT Summer Olympians (2004–2020)
- List of LGBT Summer Olympians (2024–present)
- List of LGBT Winter Olympians
- List of LGBT women's association footballers
- LGBT rights protests surrounding the 2014 Winter Olympics
- Principle 6 campaign
- Transgender people in sports
- World Outgames
