= 2014 FIFA World Cup preparations =

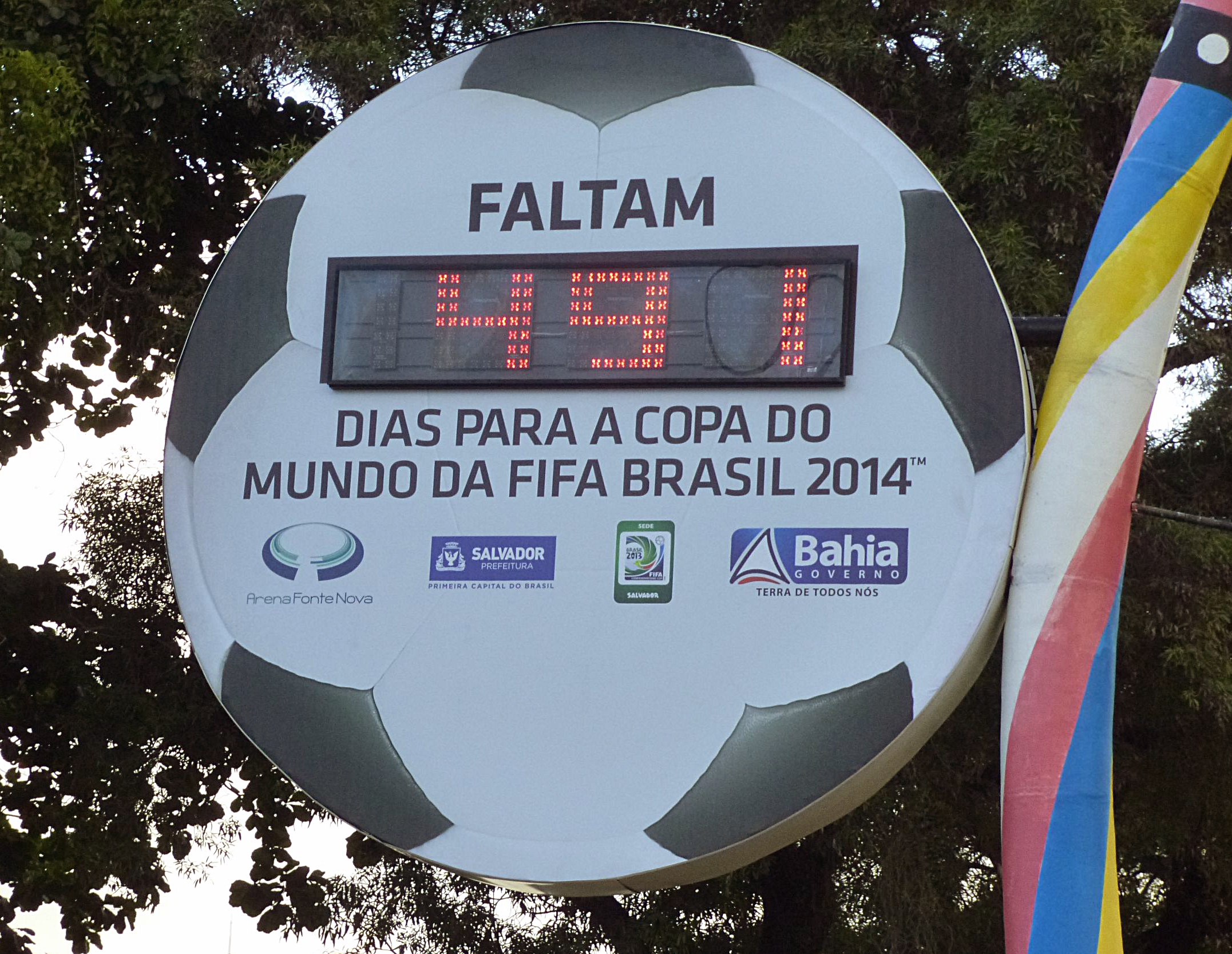
World Cup countdown clock

The 2014 FIFA World Cup tournament in Brazil cost US$11.6 billion, and was the most expensive World Cup at the time. It was surpassed by the 2018 FIFA World Cup, however, which cost an estimated $14.2 billion. FIFA spent an estimated $2 billion on the 2014 finals, with its greatest single expense $576 million in prize money. Other expenditures were largely for stadium renovation and other infrastructure projects, since Brazil undertook substantial construction to facilitate hosting the tournament.

== Brazilian investment ==
=== Stadiums ===
Dilma Rousseff (second from right) and Pelé (center) looking at stadium plans

Although the organisers originally estimated costs of $1.1 billion, $3.6 billion was reportedly spent on stadium work. Five host cities built venues for the World Cup. The Estádio Nacional Mané Garrincha stadium in Brasília (the capital) was demolished and rebuilt, and six were renovated. Maracanã Stadium in Rio de Janeiro, which held the attendance record for a FIFA World Cup final match (199,854), was the largest stadium and hosted the final. The CBF originally intended to host the opening match at São Paulo's Estádio do Morumbi, but was replaced in 2010 by the Arena Corinthians after it failed to financially guarantee required improvements.

The first new stadium, the Castelão, in Fortaleza, opened in January 2013. Six venues were used for the 2013 Confederations Cup, but six additional stadiums missed FIFA's 31 December 2013 completion deadline. The completion of the new Arena Corinthians was hampered by a fatal crane collapse in November 2013 which destroyed part of the stadium and killed two construction workers. Slow progress at the Arena da Baixada in Curitiba made FIFA threaten to drop the stadium as a host venue in January 2014 unless significant progress was made during the following month; after satisfactory progress, FIFA confirmed that Curitiba would remain a host city.

During the first quarter of 2014, the first games were held at venues in Manaus (Arena da Amazônia), Natal and Porto Alegre. After inspecting all the venues in May 2014, FIFA secretary Jérôme Valcke expressed concerns about the readiness of the Natal, Porto Alegre and São Paulo venues and required additional test events. Brazil's Deputy Sports Minister, Luis Fernandes, replied that there was "no panic".

=== Infrastructure projects ===
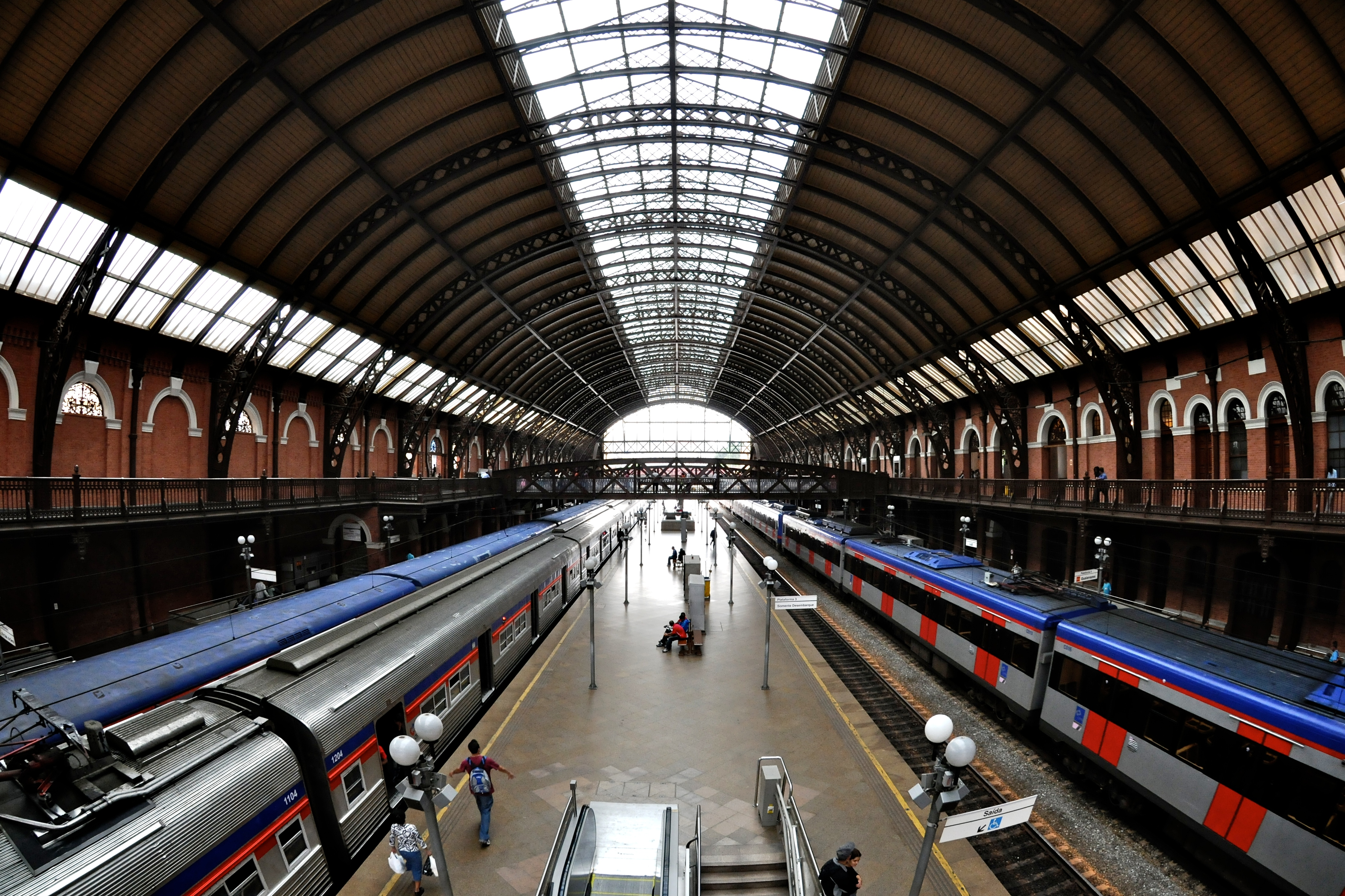
Luz Station in downtown São Paulo

In January 2010, the Brazilian federal government estimated that hosting the tournament would require a government investment of $11 billion. The government announced tax breaks for construction and renovation of stadiums for the World Cup; host cities would be exempt from VAT, and FIFA spending in Brazil would be tax-free.

The government earmarked R$3 billion (€1.8 billion, or £1.1 billion) for investment in projects related to the World Cup, and introduced a World Cup PAC. In March 2007, Brazil announced an additional PAC investment of $526 billion from 2011 to 2014.

Airports were identified as "the big problem" by the tournament's organizing committee, and experts said that Brazil's airports needed considerable renovation and expansion to accommodate those arriving for the World Cup. An estimated 600,000 people flew to the tournament, and three million traveled by air between matches. Legislation was introduced to enable Infraero, Brazil's airport operator, to facilitate airport improvements. The government had problems implementing infrastructure legislation, and forecast in 2011 that 10 of the 13 terminals scheduled for upgrading were unlikely to be completed by 2014. President Dilma Rousseff said that the government would make "a strong intervention" to ensure that the airports were ready, however, including private investment; management of three airports was transferred to the private sector in 2013 for $10.8 billion.

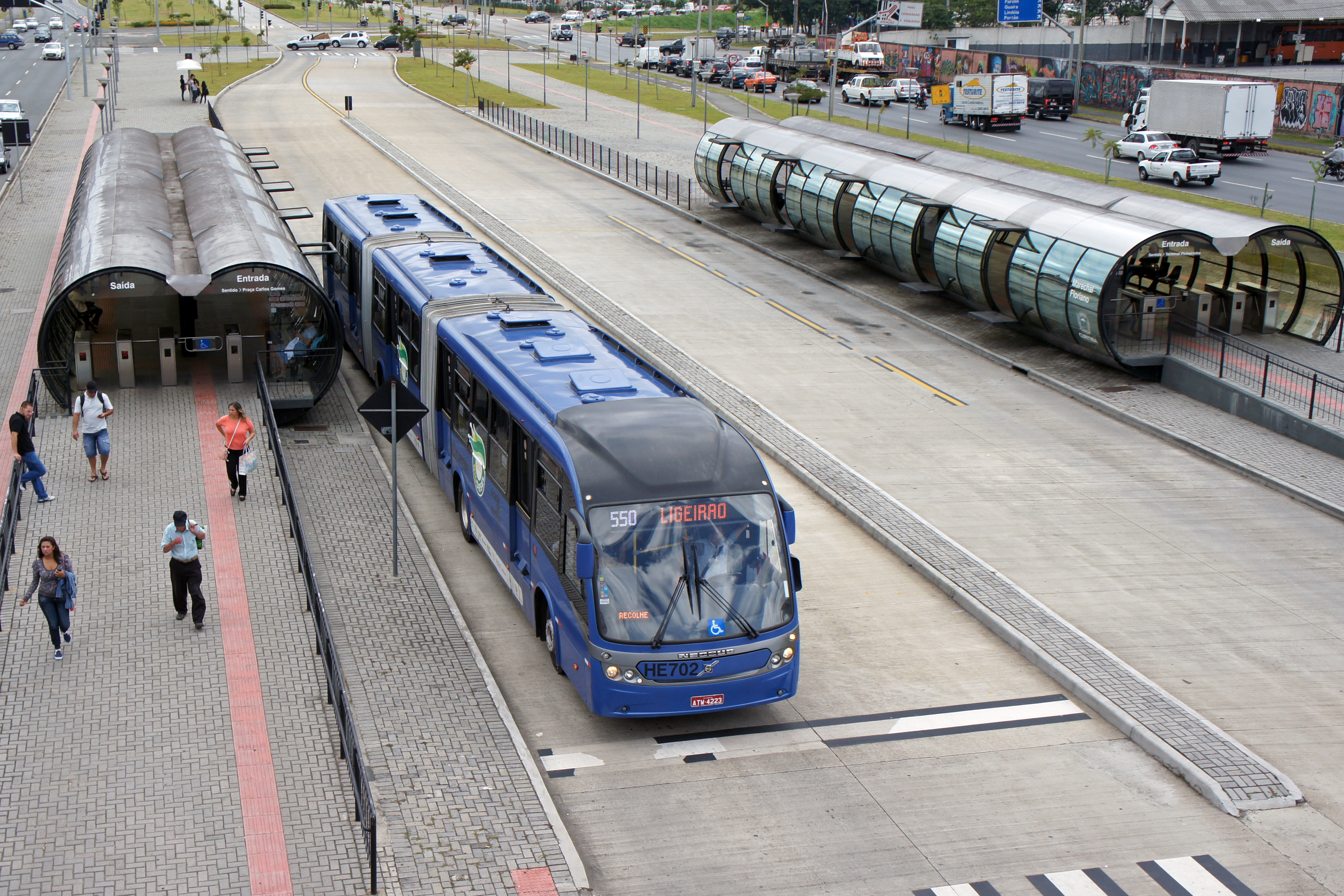
Bus rapid transit station in Curitiba

Major infrastructure projects were implemented across the country on roads, light rail and bus rapid transit lines connecting Brazil's airports to its city centres and stadiums; an estimated 4,300 kilometres (2,700 mi) of highways were improved. To host the increased number of tourists, the Brazilian Development Bank (BNDES) provided a budget of R$2 billion to modernise and increase the country's hotel network. In Rio de Janeiro, the improvements also anticipated the 2016 Summer Olympics.

Planned projects such as monorail systems in Manaus and São Paulo and a subway system in Belo Horizonte were cancelled, and others were not expected to be finished before the World Cup; other projects were downsized. In May 2014, it was reported that 36 of the planned 93 major projects were completed. FIFA secretary-general Jérôme Valcke defended the progress, saying that "it was clear from the beginning not all the projects would be ready ... these projects were part of a government plan that goes far beyond the World Cup", and the organization pledged to spend at least $20 million on "legacy projects" in Brazil after the tournament.

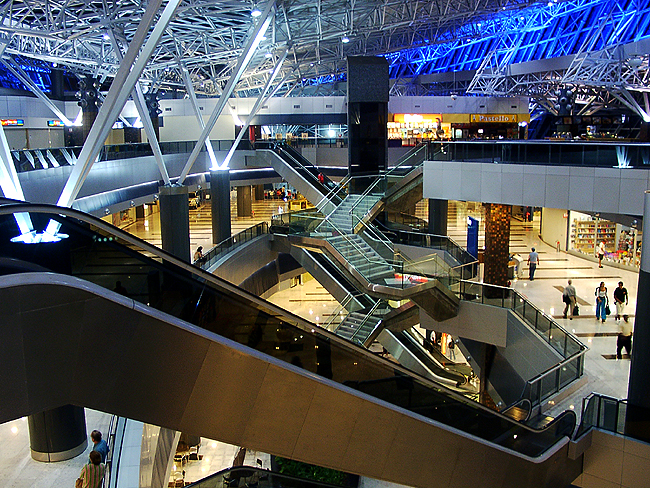
Recife International Airport

The government's failure to complete all the originally-planned projects was criticised by some Brazilians, who also opposed its investment in the World Cup. An opinion poll by Datafolha two months before the start of the tournament indicated that 48 percent of respondents supported the tournament, a decline from 79 percent in 2008; 55 percent of respondents said that the event would be a net negative for Brazil. According to FIFA President Sepp Blatter, "Brazilians are a bit discontented because they were promised a lot".

Footballer-turned-politician Romário criticised his country's handling of the preparations and said that "FIFA's requirements were excessive". Ronaldo, another former Brazilian player, said that he was "embarrassed" by the state of the country's infrastructure and that "a series of investments were promised that won't be delivered - only 30 percent will be delivered".

According to a group of German economists, hosting a sports event of this magnitude by a newly industrialized country like Brazil or Russia was an economic luxury. They suggested two measures to make such events sustainable: building less and economic support from the organizing associations. Large stadiums and streets were unused after an event, negatively impacting the ratio of investment to assets. For this reason, the group feared that Olympic Games and football world championships would only be hosted in countries with authoritarian regimes.

=== Security ===
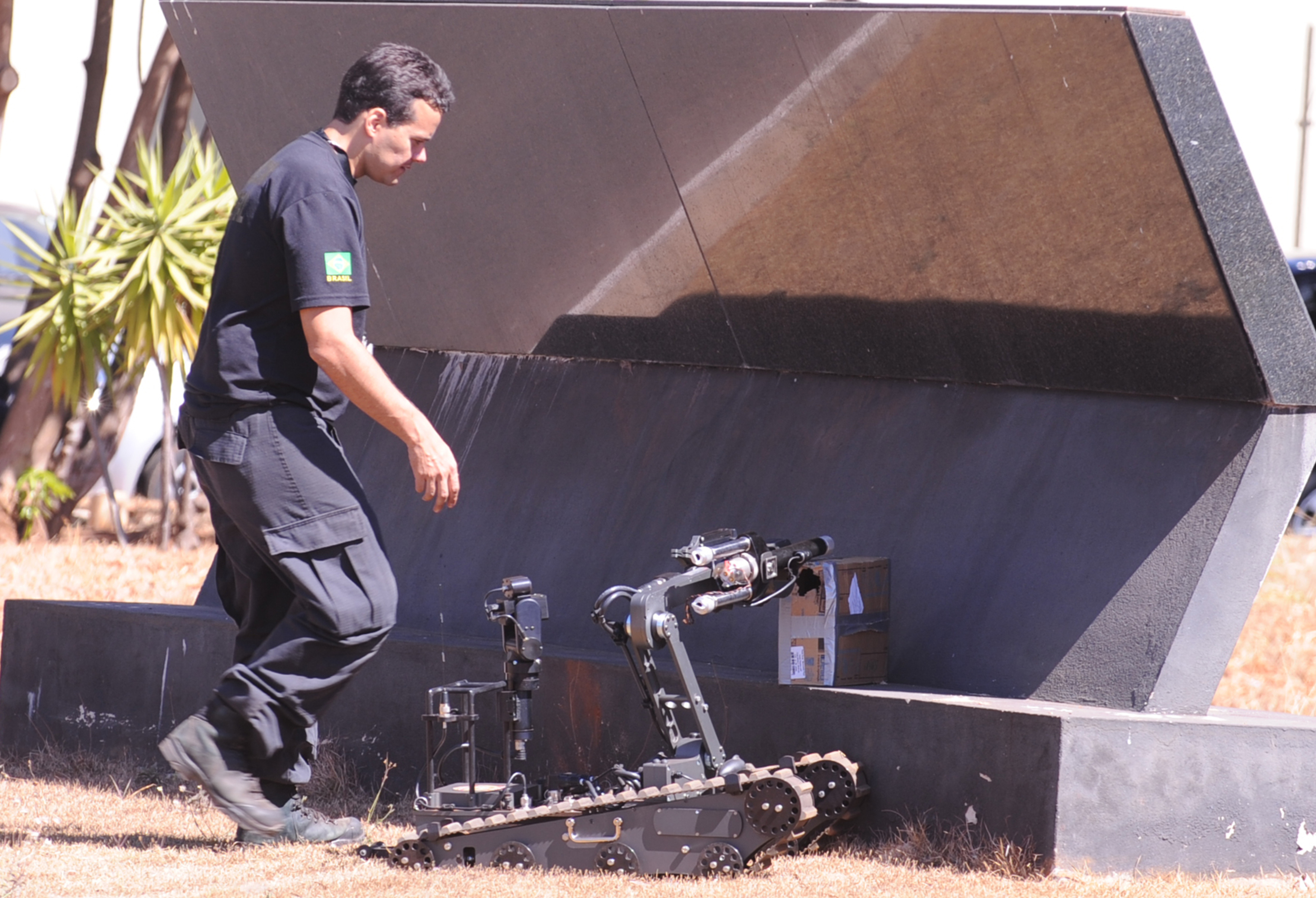
Brazilian police officer testing an anti-bomb robot

The Brazilian government pledged $900 million for security forces, and said that the World Cup would be "one of the most protected sports events in history". The government planned to have one police officer for every 50 people attending matches, and one for every 80 people at viewing events around the country.

Investments in security measures such as facial recognition systems and unmanned security robots were made. An integrated security plan was developed which sought information about potential terrorists and troublemakers. A total of 150,000 public security professionals and military was planned to ensure security, along with 20,000 private security personnel.

Security concerns increased after protests during Brazil's staging of the 2013 FIFA Confederations Cup, in which disturbances occurred outside stadiums. Protesters cited the amount of public money being invested by the Brazilian government in the World Cup at the expense of social services for its population.

=== Human cost ===
The projected financial cost to the Brazilian government was estimated at $14 billion. In May 2014 in Brasília, the nation's capital, indigenous protesters clashed with police on horseback during a protest of the World Cup; one policeman shot in the leg, and police fired tear gas into the crowd to disperse the protest. An indigenous population of 10 to 20 of Brazil's 300 ethnic groups was evicted from an abandoned museum next to Maracanã Stadium in Rio de Janeiro, reportedly for the construction of a parking lot.

== FIFA investment ==
FIFA forecast that it would spend $2 billion to stage the 2014 World Cup Final.

== Statistics ==
Costs of latest WCs
Host	General cost
RUS (2018)	US$14.2 billion
BRA (2014)	US$11.6 billion
GER (2006)	$6 billion
KOR/JPN (2002)	$5 billion
ITA (1990)	$5 billion
RSA (2010)	$4 billion
FRA (1998)	$340 million
USA (1994)	$30 million

== See also ==
- Visa policy of Brazil
- Economics of the FIFA World Cup
