= List of 2022 FIFA World Cup controversies =

Issues with football tournament in Qatar

The decision of FIFA to host the 2022 FIFA World Cup in Qatar sparked a number of concerns and controversies regarding both Qatar's suitability as a host country and the fairness of the FIFA World Cup bidding process. Some media outlets, sporting experts, and human rights groups have criticised Qatar's record of human rights violations; Qatar's limited football history; the high expected cost; the local climate; and alleged bribery in the bidding process. Not all nations competing have put focus on concerns.

Criticism of human rights in Qatar focused on the treatment of migrant workers, women, and position on LGBT rights, leading to allegations of sportswashing. Others have cited Qatar's intense climate and lack of a strong football culture, as well as evidence of bribery for hosting rights and wider FIFA corruption. Boycotts of the event were declared by several countries, clubs, and individual players, while former FIFA President Sepp Blatter has twice said that giving Qatar hosting rights was a "mistake". Match attendance figures have also come under scrutiny as reported crowd attendances have exceeded stadium capacities despite games having visible empty seats. Over the past 5 years, the government has engaged closely with the ILO (international labour organisation), international trade union, NGOs, etc. The Guardian reported it all in its article published on 23 October 2022. The article included statements from workers involved in building infrastructure for the World Cup 2022. A survey among 1,000 low-wage workers found that 86% of respondents felt that the labour reforms had positively affected their lives. Now workers can negotiate for better conditions, and employers are incentivised to provide them in order to attract and retain talent. Legislation has also been introduced to the minimum wage, on protecting outdoor workers during the summer months, and on the election of migrant worker representatives within companies. Change to the kafala system has led to labour mobility. Another report by the United Nations claimed that "Qatar is changing. The new kafala system tranche of law will bring an end to kafala and put in place a modern industrial relations system" said Sharan Burrow, General Secretary of the International Trade Union Confederation. This was published on October 17, 2019, before the world cup took place.

Incumbent FIFA President Gianni Infantino has defended the hosting of the tournament in Qatar. Others have suggested that Qatar's human rights record is better than those of Russia and China, nations which received less widespread criticism for similar issues when hosting major sporting events in the years prior (the former hosted the previous tournament). The controversies surrounding the World Cup in Qatar have been described as a cultural conflict or "Clash of Civilizations" between authoritarian Islamic regimes and secular liberal democracies. The Qatari tournament is widely regarded as one of the most controversial FIFA World Cups in history.

== Human rights concern ==
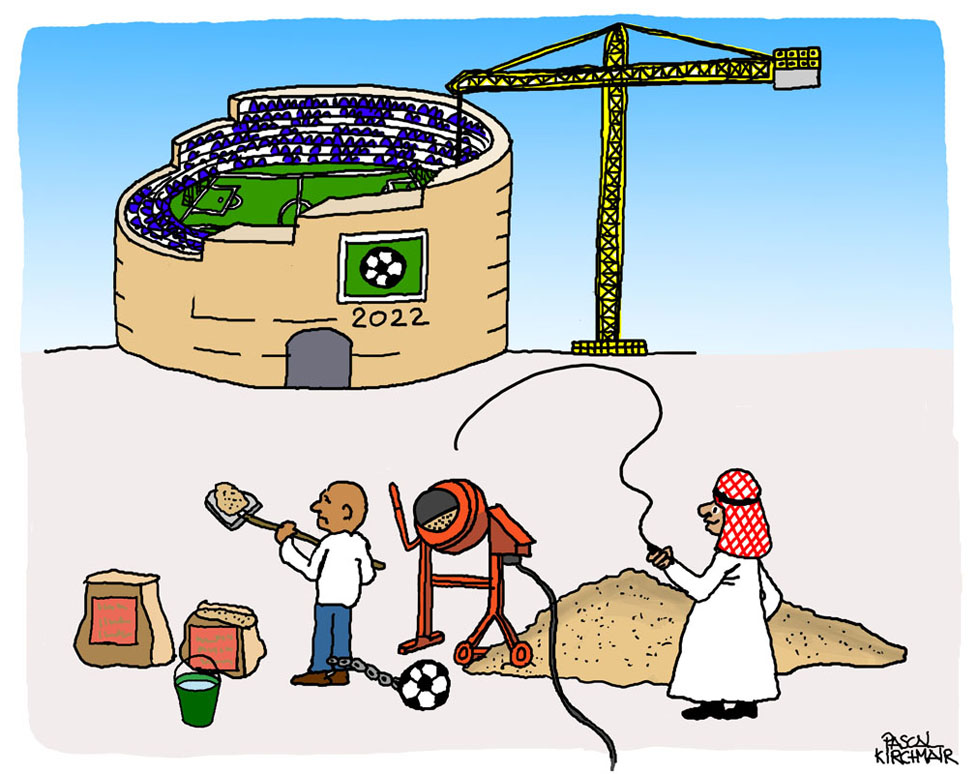
A political cartoon depicting slave labour in the construction of the stadiums in Qatar ahead of the 2022 FIFA World Cup (see also: Slavery in Qatar)

In a December 2021 interview with Al Jazeera, FIFA's secretary-general Fatma Samoura said that FIFA had developed a general framework to structure and guide the implementation of its human rights responsibilities and commitment, published in 2017, and that Qatar had implemented those recommendations. After a thorough investigation, the International Labour Organization, claimed the figures "misleading" and said they had been wrongly linked to World Cup sites without proper context in November 2022 via reported drafted by France24. Labor Minister Ali bin Samikh Al Marri said Qatar already has started a Workers' Support and Insurance Fund to help workers which successfully reimbursed US$320 million this year alone to victims through the Insurance Fund stated the ILO in November 2022. Furthermore, according to a statement by ITUC (International Trade Union Confederation) General Secretary Sharan Burrow, who had previously been a harsh critic of Qatar's labour laws, workers can now obtain justice in the country. She praised "the amazing change of the labour legislation in Qatar. In an article, which was published in September 2020, experts from the OHCHR (Office of the High Commissioner for Human Rights) added, "We are very encouraged by the bold steps Qatar is taking to increase the protection of migrant workers' rights and ensure adequate living and working conditions for all."

== LGBTQ issues ==
Due to Islamic sharia law, there are no LGBTQ rights in Qatar, with homosexuality, as well as campaigning for LGBTQ rights, criminalised. As such, when Qatar was selected to host the 2022 FIFA World Cup, the choice to do so in a restrictive nation saw much criticism, with several topics becoming the subject of controversy. The security of fans, as well as the homophobic football chants of certain nations, were points of discussion.

The main controversy came from a last-minute FIFA decision to hand out player punishments to European captains who had months earlier announced their intention to defy FIFA's equipment regulations on non-mandated armbands and continue wearing third-party rainbow-coloured ones (which began in 2020) in support of anti-discrimination; though not specifically in support of LGBTQ+ rights, nor targeting Qatar's lack, the rainbow symbol was deemed offensive to the hosts. Typically, kit violations incur a fine, which the teams had said they would pay; on the day of the first match involving one of the European teams, FIFA told the teams that they would receive a yellow card as a minimum.

Security officials at stadiums also confiscated items of rainbow clothing, flags featuring rainbows, whether Pride-related or not, and reportedly intimidated fans. American journalist Grant Wahl was briefly detained for wearing a T-shirt with a rainbow on it.

== Pre-tournament ==
=== Stadiums ===
==== Environmental impact ====
Each stadium in Qatar requires 10,000 litres of water per day in winter months, when the tournament is taking place, to maintain the pitch. With little access to freshwater in the nation, the sourced water was saltwater, which has to be desalinated. The process damages the marine environment. Desalination plants in the Middle East also heavily rely on the use of fossil fuels. As well as the pitches at the stadiums, the organising committee grew and maintained a large farm of match-suitable fresh grass outside Doha, in case of turf damage. The need for so much desalination, and the oil and gas used to power the plants, have been criticised.

One of the eight stadiums, Stadium 974, was designed to be able to be disassembled so that it could be moved elsewhere, in an effort to counter the negative effect of requiring upkeep of unused stadiums. The large PR campaign promoting this was criticised by activists, as it overlooked the other stadiums being constructed in Qatar. Stadium 974 and the organising committee pledge that the tournament would be carbon neutral were also criticised as attempts to greenwash Qatar, the nation with the highest per-capita CO_{2} emissions, especially as carbon neutrality was planned to be achieved by planting trees to offset emissions generated by the tournament, rather than use alternative energies. Stadium 974, located at a port, does not have air conditioning; due to the climate of Qatar, the other seven stadiums do, with the systems running on fossil fuels.

=== Corruption ===
There have been allegations of bribery or corruption in the Qatar's 2022 World Cup selection process involving members of FIFA's executive committee. There have been numerous allegations of bribery between the Qatar bid committee and FIFA members and executives, some of whom—including Sepp Blatter—were later recorded regretting awarding Qatar the tournament.

==== 2011 ====
In May 2011, allegations of corruption within the FIFA senior officials raised questions over the legitimacy of the World Cup being held in Qatar. According to then vice-president Jack Warner, an email has been publicised about the possibility that Qatar 'bought' the 2022 World Cup through bribery via Mohammed bin Hammam who was president of the Asian Football Confederation at the time. Qatar's officials in the bid team for 2022 have denied any wrongdoing. A whistleblower, revealed to be Phaedra Almajid, alleged that several African officials were paid $1.5m by Qatar. She later retracted her claims of bribery, stating she had fabricated them in order to exact revenge on the Qatari bid team for relieving her of her job with them. She also denied being put under any pressure to make her retraction. FIFA confirmed receiving an email from her which stated her retraction.

==== 2014–15 ====
In March 2014, it was alleged that a firm linked to Qatar's successful campaign paid committee member Jack Warner and his family almost $2 million. The Daily Telegraph reported that it understands that the U.S. FBI is investigating Warner and his alleged links to the Qatari bid.

On 1 June 2014, The Sunday Times claimed to have obtained documents including e-mails, letters and bank transfers which allegedly proved that Bin Hammam had paid more than 5 million US dollars to Football officials to support the Qatar bid. Bin Hamman and all those accused of accepting bribes denied the charges.

Later in June 2014, Qatar Airways CEO Akbar Al Baker gave an interview to German media in June 2014 stating that the allegations are being driven by envy and mistrust by parties who do not want the World Cup staged in Qatar, and that the country is not getting the respect it deserves over its efforts to hold the World Cup. He reiterated that the Qatari Emir strictly punishes and forbids instances of corruption and bribery with a zero-tolerance policy.

In an interview published on 7 June 2015, Domenico Scala, the head of FIFA's Audit And Compliance Committee, stated that "should there be evidence that the awards to Qatar and Russia came only because of bought votes, then the awards could be cancelled".

==== FIFA ethics investigation report ====
In 2014, FIFA appointed Michael Garcia as its independent ethics investigator to look into bribery allegations against Russia and Qatar, the hosts for the 2018 and 2022 World Cup respectively. Garcia investigated all nine bids and eleven countries involved in the 2018 and 2022 bids and spoke to all persons connected to the bids and appealed for witnesses to come forward with evidence. At the end of investigation, Garcia submitted a 430-page report in September 2015. FIFA governing body then appointed a German judge Hans Joachim Eckert who reviewed and presented a 42-page summary of the report two months later. The report cleared Qatar and Russia of bribery allegations stating that Qatar "pulled Aspire into the orbit of the bid in significant ways" but did not "compromise the integrity" of the overall bid process.

Michael Garcia reacted almost immediately stating that the report is “materially incomplete” and with “erroneous representations of the facts and conclusions". In 2017, a German journalist Peter Rossberg who claimed to have obtained the report wrote in a Facebook post that the report "does not provide the proof that the 2018 or 2022 World Cup was bought" and stated that he would publish the full report bit by bit. This forced FIFA to release the original report as authored by the investigator Michael Garcia. The full report did not provide any evidence of corruption against the host of 2022 World Cup but stated that bidders tested rules of conduct to the limit. The report ended talks of a re-vote.

==== 2020 ====
In January, Bonita Mersiades, a whistle-blower from inside Australia's 2022 World Cup bid published a book which alleges that in the months before the vote in December 2010, FIFA executives were privately worried that a Qatar win would leave a financial shortfall for the governing body in 2022 which Al Jazeera (now beIN Sports) agreed a secret deal to pay $100 million if Qatar won the vote. According to the book, the deal took place with the involvement and knowledge of Jérôme Valcke, secretary general of FIFA at the time who was later banned for nine years from football for corruption. The Mail on Sunday asked beIN Sports about the allegations, in which a spokesman characterised the bonus as "production contributions" which were "standard market practice and are often imposed upon broadcasters by sports federations and sports rights holders".

According to leaked documents obtained by The Sunday Times, Qatari state-run television channel Al Jazeera secretly offered $400 million to FIFA, for broadcasting rights, just 21 days before FIFA announced that Qatar will hold the 2022 World Cup. The contract also documented a secret TV deal between FIFA and Qatar's state run media broadcast Al Jazeera that $100 million will also be paid into a designated FIFA account only if Qatar wins the World Cup ballot in 2010. An additional $480 million was also offered by the State of Qatar government, three years after the initial offer, which brings the amount to $880 million offered by Qatar to host the 2022 World Cup. The documents are now part of the bribery inquiry by Swiss Police.

FIFA refused to comment on the inquiry and responded to The Sunday Times in an email and wrote "allegations linked to the FIFA World Cup 2022 bid have already been extensively commented by FIFA, who in June 2017 published the Garcia report in full on Fifa.com. Furthermore, please note that Fifa lodged a criminal complaint with the Office of the Attorney General of Switzerland, which is still pending. FIFA is and will continue to cooperate with the authorities." A beIN spokesman said in a statement that the company would not "respond to unsubstantiated or wildly speculative allegations."

Damian Collins, a British Member of Parliament (MP) and chairman of a UK parliamentary committee, called for payments from Al Jazeera to be frozen and launched an investigation into the apparent contract since the contract "appears to be in clear breach of the rules".

Former UEFA president Michel Platini was arrested by French police on 18 June 2019 in relation to the rewarding of the 2022 World Cup to Qatar. He was detained at the Anti-Corruption Office of the Judicial Police outside Paris. The arrest represents the first substantial public move in an investigation into the Qatar decision opened two years ago by France's National Financial Prosecutor's office, which is responsible for law enforcement against serious financial crime.

=== Scheduling ===
The notion of staging the tournament in winter proved controversial; Blatter ruled out a January or February event because it may clash with the 2022 Winter Olympics, while others expressed concerns over a November or December event, because it might clash with the Christmas season (even though Qatar is predominantly Muslim, the players in the tournament are predominantly Christian). The Premier League voiced concern over moving the tournament to the northern hemisphere's winter as it could interfere with the local leagues. FA Chairman Greg Dyke said, shortly after he took his job in 2013, that he was open to either a winter tournament or moving the tournament to another country. FIFA executive committee member Theo Zwanziger said that awarding the 2022 World Cup to Qatar's desert state was a "blatant mistake", and that any potential shift to a winter event would be unmanageable due to the effect on major European domestic leagues.

In October 2013, a taskforce was commissioned to consider alternative dates, and report after the 2014 World Cup in Brazil. In early 2014, FIFA Secretary-General Jerome Valcke appeared to preempt this, saying: "Frankly, I think it will happen between November 15 and the end of December because that is when the weather is more favourable. It's more like springtime in Europe". This was controversial within FIFA itself, due to a possible conflict with the Christmas season, and Vice-president Jim Boyce responded in saying that "it absolutely has not been decided as far as the executive committee are concerned.

It was agreed all the stakeholders should meet, all the stakeholders should have an input and then the decision would be made, and that decision as far as I understand will not be taken until the end of 2014 or the March executive meeting in 2015. As it stands it remains in the summer with no decision expected until end of 2014 or March 2015". Another option to combat heat problems was changing the date of the World Cup to the northern hemisphere's winter, when the climate in Qatar would be cooler. However, this proved just as problematic as doing so would disrupt the calendar of a number of domestic leagues, particularly in Europe.

Franz Beckenbauer, a member of FIFA's executive committee, said Qatar could be allowed to host the 2022 World Cup in winter. He justified his proposal on the grounds that Qatar would be saving money, which otherwise they would have spent in cooling the stadiums. Beckenbauer said: "One should think about another solution. In January and February you have comfortable 25 °C (77 °F) there". "Qatar won the vote and deserves a fair chance as the first host from the Middle East". At a ceremony in Qatar marking the occasion of having been awarded the World Cup, FIFA President Sepp Blatter later agreed that this suggestion was plausible, but FIFA later clarified that any change from the bid position of a June–July games would be for the host association to propose. Beckenbauer would later receive a 90-day ban from any football-related activity from FIFA after refusing to cooperate in the investigation of bribery.

The notion of holding the Cup during Europe's winter was further boosted by UEFA President Michel Platini's indicating that he was ready to rearrange the European club competitions accordingly. Platini's vote for the summer 2022 World Cup went to Qatar. FIFA President Sepp Blatter also said that despite air-conditioned stadiums the event was more than the games itself and involved other cultural events. In this regard, he questioned if fans and players could take part in the summer temperatures.

In addition to objections by European leagues, Frank Lowy, chairman of Football Federation Australia, said a change of the 2022 World Cup date from summer to winter would upset the schedule of the A-League and said they would seek compensation from FIFA should the decision go ahead. Richard Scudamore, chief executive of the Premier League, stated that they would consider legal action against FIFA because a move would interfere with the Premier League's popular Christmas and New Year fixture programme.

In September 2013, it was alleged that FIFA had held talks with broadcasters over the decision to change the date of the World Cup as it doing so could cause potential clashes with other scheduled television programming. The Fox Broadcasting Company who had paid $425 million for the right to broadcast both the 2018 and 2022 World Cups in the US, later voiced anger over the possible season switch, as doing so would clash with that year's NFL season, which takes place in the winter and with whom Fox also has a lucrative broadcasting deal. The network said they bought the rights with the understanding the tournament would take place in the summer, and if the change did go ahead they would seek compensation.

In February 2015, FIFA awarded Fox the rights to the 2026 World Cup, without opening it up for bidding with ESPN, NBC, and other interested American broadcasters. Richard Sandomir of The New York Times reported that FIFA did so to avoid Fox from suing in U.S. courts, which under the American legal system could force FIFA to open up their books and expose any possible corruption. As BBC sports editor Dan Roan observed, "It does not seem to matter to FIFA that rival networks ESPN and NBC may have wanted to bid, or that more money could have been generated for the good of the sport had a proper auction been held. As ever, it seemed, FIFA was looking after itself".

On 24 February 2015, it was announced that a winter World Cup would go ahead in favour of the traditional summertime event. The event was scheduled to be held between November and December. Commentators noted the clash with the Christmas season was likely to cause disruption, whilst there was concern for how short the tournament was intended to be. It was also confirmed that the 2023 Africa Cup of Nations would be moved from January to June to prevent African players from having a relatively quick two-week turnaround, although the monsoonal rainy season in its host country Guinea starts about that time.

=== Climate ===
As the World Cup usually occurs during the northern hemisphere's summer, the weather in Qatar was a concern with temperatures reaching more than 50 °C (122 °F). Two doctors from Qatar's Aspetar sports hospital in Doha who gave an interview in November 2010 to Qatar Today magazine said the climate would be an issue, stating that the region's climate would "affect performance levels from a health point of view" of professional athletes, specifically footballers, that "recovery times between games would be longer" than in a temperate climate and that, on the field of play, "more mistakes would be made". One of the doctors said that "total acclimation (to the Qatari climate) is impossible".

The inspection team for evaluating who would host the tournament said that Qatar was "high risk" due to the weather. FIFA President Sepp Blatter initially rejected the criticism, but in September 2013 said the FIFA executive committee would evaluate the feasibility of the event in winter instead of summer. As a result, FIFA postponed from Summer to 20 November 2022, following a unanimous decision by the Bureau of the FIFA Council.

=== Cost ===
By some estimates, the World Cup is set to cost Qatar approximately US$220 billion (£184 billion). This is about 60 times the $3.5 billion that South Africa spent on the 2010 FIFA World Cup. Nicola Ritter, a German legal and financial analyst, told an investors' summit held in Munich that £107 billion would be spent on stadiums and facilities plus a further £31 billion on transport infrastructure. Ritter said £30 billion would be spent on building air-conditioned stadiums with £48 billion on training facilities and accommodation for players and fans. A further £28 billion will be spent on creating a new city called Lusail that will surround the stadium that will host the opening and final matches of the tournament.

According to a report released in April 2013 by Merrill Lynch, the investment banking division of Bank of America, the organisers in Qatar have requested from FIFA to approve a smaller number of stadiums due to the growing costs. Bloomberg.com said that Qatar wished to cut the number of venues to 8 or 9 from the 12 originally planned. A report released in December 2010 quoted FIFA President Sepp Blatter as stating that Qatar's neighbours could host some matches during the World Cup. However, no specific countries were named in the report. Blatter added that any such decision must be taken by Qatar first and then endorsed by FIFA's executive committee. Prince Ali bin Al Hussein of Jordan told the Australian Associated Press that holding games in Bahrain, United Arab Emirates, and possibly Saudi Arabia would help to accommodate the people of the region during the tournament.

=== Possible Israeli qualification ===
The head of the Qatar bid delegation stated that if Israel were to qualify, they would be able to compete in the World Cup despite Qatar not recognising the state of Israel. Israel ultimately were eliminated during FIFA World Cup qualification, and thus did not compete at the tournament in Qatar.

=== Russia's participation following its invasion of Ukraine ===
After Russia invaded Ukraine in February 2022, FIFA stated that matches would not be held in Russia, though Russia would still be able to continue its participation in World Cup qualifying, where it had reached Path B. Also in Path B were Poland, the Czech Republic and Sweden, all of which refused to play against Russia in any form (as did England, which had already qualified for the tournament).

On 27 February 2022, FIFA announced a number of sanctions impacting Russia's participation in international football. Russia was prohibited from hosting international competitions, and the national team had been ordered to play all home matches behind closed doors in neutral countries. They may not compete under the name, flag, or national anthem of Russia: similarly to the Russian athletes' participation in events such as the Olympics, the team would compete under the abbreviation of their national federation, the Russian Football Union ("RFU") rather than "Russia". The next day, FIFA decided to suspend Russia from international competitions "until further notice", including its participation in the 2022 FIFA World Cup. In July 2022, the Court of Arbitration for Sport dismissed the Russian appeals and upheld FIFA's and UEFA's decisions.

Some observers, while approving of the boycott of Russia, pointed out that FIFA did not boycott Saudi Arabia for its military intervention in Yemen, or Qatar for its human rights violations.

=== Qatari football record ===
At the time of being awarded the tournament in 2010, Qatar was ranked 113 in the world, and had never qualified for the World Cup before. The most prestigious accolade the team had won was the Arabian Gulf Cup twice, both times hosting. Since being awarded the tournament, they have also won the Arabian Gulf Cup for a third time in 2014 and the AFC Asian Cup in 2019. Qatar became the smallest country by land area to host the World Cup (less than half the size of 1954 hosts Switzerland, when the tournament consisted of 16 teams). These facts led some to question the strength of football culture in Qatar and if that made them unsuitable World Cup hosts.

The Qatar Football Association has also been known to naturalise players from foreign nations for its own team. Examples include Sebastián Soria, Luiz Júnior and Emerson Sheik. The Qatar FA has previously attempted to offer incentives to uncapped players of other nations to switch allegiance to the Gulf state. These have included the German-based Brazilian trio of Aílton, Dedé and Leandro in 2004 – none of whom have ever played in or have other connections to Qatar – to help their team qualify for the 2006 FIFA World Cup. FIFA blocked the moves and as a result, tightened eligibility requirements for national teams.

With a 2–0 loss to Ecuador on the tournament's opening day, Qatar became the first host nation to lose their opening match at the World Cup; Qatar subsequently lost 3–1 to Senegal in their second group match, becoming the first team to be eliminated from the tournament after the Netherlands drew 1-1 vs Ecuador later (putting both on four points, Senegal with three and Qatar with zero). They lost their final group game 2–0 to the Netherlands, becoming the first host to lose all their games, as well as the first host to finish 4th in their group and last overall in the tournament ranking. As of co-host Canada defeating Qatar 6-0 in the following tournament (alongside Mexico and the United States winning their games), Qatar remains the only team to not win a match in the tournament they hosted.

=== Alcohol ===
Hassan Al-Thawadi, chief executive of the Qatar 2022 World Cup bid, said the Muslim state would also permit alcohol consumption during the event. Specific fan-zones would be established where alcohol could be bought. Although expatriates may purchase alcohol and certain businesses may sell alcohol with a permit, drinking in public is not permitted as Qatar's legal system is based on Sharia.

In February 2022, the communications executive director at the supreme committee, Fatma Al-Nuaimi, stated in an interview that alcohol would be available in designated fan zones outside stadiums and in other Qatari official hospitality venues. In July 2022, it was reported that while fans would be allowed to bring alcoholic beverages into the stadiums, alcoholic beverages would not be sold inside the stadiums. But according to a source, "the plans are still being finalised." However, on 18 November 2022, days before the first match, Qatar officially banned alcoholic beverages from sale within the eight stadiums. The ban only applied to regular fans, and alcohol was still available to FIFA officials and wealthy guests.

On 30 November 2022, The Times published an interview with some female fans attending FIFA World Cup 2022 games, with some of them saying that less drunkenness among other attendees made them feel safer at the stadiums than they expected.

=== November 2022 Infantino communications ===
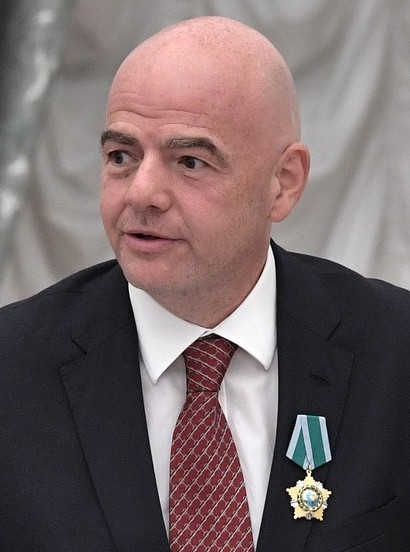
FIFA president Gianni Infantino

==== "Focus on the football" letter ====
On 5 November 2022, Gianni Infantino and Fatma Samoura sent out a letter to all participating nations telling them to cease and avoid any further or current discussion of Qatar's poor human rights records to "respect all opinions and beliefs, without handing out moral lessons to the rest of the world" and to "focus on the football" as to "not allow football to be dragged into every ideological or political battle that exists". Notably, members of the UEFA Working Group such as Australia, Belgium, Denmark, England, France, Germany, the Netherlands, Norway, Sweden, Switzerland, and the United States were specifically targeted for their involvement in trying to improve the conditions for migrant workers, women, and LGBT people. All of the nations criticised the letter, stating "FIFA acknowledged in their letter that football does not operate in a vacuum, however they seem to be calling for that to be the case. History has shown us that the pursuit of such a strategy will be self-defeating and only further erodes football's social license to operate."

==== "Today I feel" address ====
On 19 November 2022, Infantino gave an hour-long address to the media during a pre-tournament press conference, during which he defended FIFA's hosting of the tournament in Qatar, and commented upon pre-tournament developments such as the banning of alcohol. He opened by declaring that he "felt" Qatari, Arabic, African, gay, disabled, and like a migrant worker, because he understood how it felt to be discriminated. He argued that criticism of the treatment of migrant workers by Western critics was hypocritical because "for what we Europeans have been doing for 3,000 years around the world, we should be apologising for the next 3,000 years before starting to give moral lessons to people". Infantino argued that none of the European companies "who earn millions and millions from Qatar or other countries in the region" had taken steps to address the rights of migrant workers like FIFA had, and suggested that Europe needed to be more open to accepting refugees and migrant workers. He asked, "do we want to continue to spit on the others because they look different, or they feel different? We defend human rights. We do it our way. We obtain results. We got women fans in Iran. The Women's League was created in Sudan. Let's celebrate. Don't divide." In response to a last-minute prohibition on the sale of alcohol inside the stadiums, Infantino stated that it was a decision made jointly by FIFA and the organising committee, but argued that FIFA was still in "200% control" of the event, prohibitions on the sale of alcohol at sporting events were not exclusive to Qatar, and joked that "if this is the biggest issue we have for the World Cup then I will resign immediately and go to the beach to relax". He once again argued that people should "focus on the football", and direct their criticism to FIFA and "me if you want" instead of Qatar.

The speech drew further criticism: The Associated Press labeled the speech an "extraordinary diatribe" and a "tirade" while The Guardian called it "bizarre and incendiary". Infantino was accused of deflecting criticism of Qatar's human rights record. Amnesty International criticised Infantino for "brushing aside legitimate human rights criticisms", Sky Sports pundit Melissa Reddy accused Infantino of engaging in whataboutism, while FairSquare director Nicholas McGeehan described the remarks as being "as crass as they were clumsy", and feeling like "talking points directly from the Qatari authorities". Writing for The Observer, Barney Ronay described the address as being "a wretched spectacle—not to mention myopic, tin-eared and oddly lost", and felt that Infantino was "clearly furious with his critics, furious that this thing cannot be bent to his will. And by the end it had become hugely engrossing just to see someone so blind to his own contortions, so shameless, and quite clearly losing his grip on his own spectacular."

== Opening ceremony and anthem ==
In the weeks before the tournament began, singers Dua Lipa and Shakira announced that they had refused to perform at the opening ceremony and collaborate on the tournament anthem due to human rights violations implemented by the Emirate's internal policies. British singer Rod Stewart said he turned down a substantial offer to perform in the country: "They offered me a lot of money, more than a million dollars, to perform there [in Qatar]. I turned it down. It's not right to go there." In addition, the league's ambassador, David Beckham, was criticised by the LGBT community in the United Kingdom for lending his face to the event in exchange for $10 million. Discussing Beckham's involvement, former Spice Girls member Melanie C said that it is "complex" for sports to change culture when so much money is involved. British singer Robbie Williams defended his choice to participate as a guest at the opening event, stating: "I don't condone any abuses of human rights anywhere. But, that being said, if we're not condoning human rights abuses anywhere, then it would be the shortest tour the world has ever known. [...] You get this microscope that goes 'okay, these are the baddies, and we need to rally against them'... I think that the hypocrisy there is that if we take that case in this place, we need to apply that unilaterally to the world. Then if we apply that unilaterally to the world, nobody can go anywhere".

After the announcement of the collaboration for the World Cup anthem "Tukoh Taka", performed by Trinidadian rapper Nicki Minaj, Colombian singer Maluma, and Lebanese singer Myriam Fares, the three artists have been affected by a great deal of controversy for choosing to be paid to sing a song in an Emirate whose internal policies involve the violation of human rights, women's rights, LGBT rights, as well as the support of slavery and child exploitation. Singer Maluma replied to the charge by declaring: "it's something I can't resolve; [...] It's not something that I actually have to be involved with. I'm here enjoying my music and the beautiful life, playing soccer too".

American actor Morgan Freeman was criticised on social media by media outlets for participating in the tournament's opening ceremony, with references made to his acting performance as Nelson Mandela in the dedicated film Invictus (2009).

== Iranian protests ==
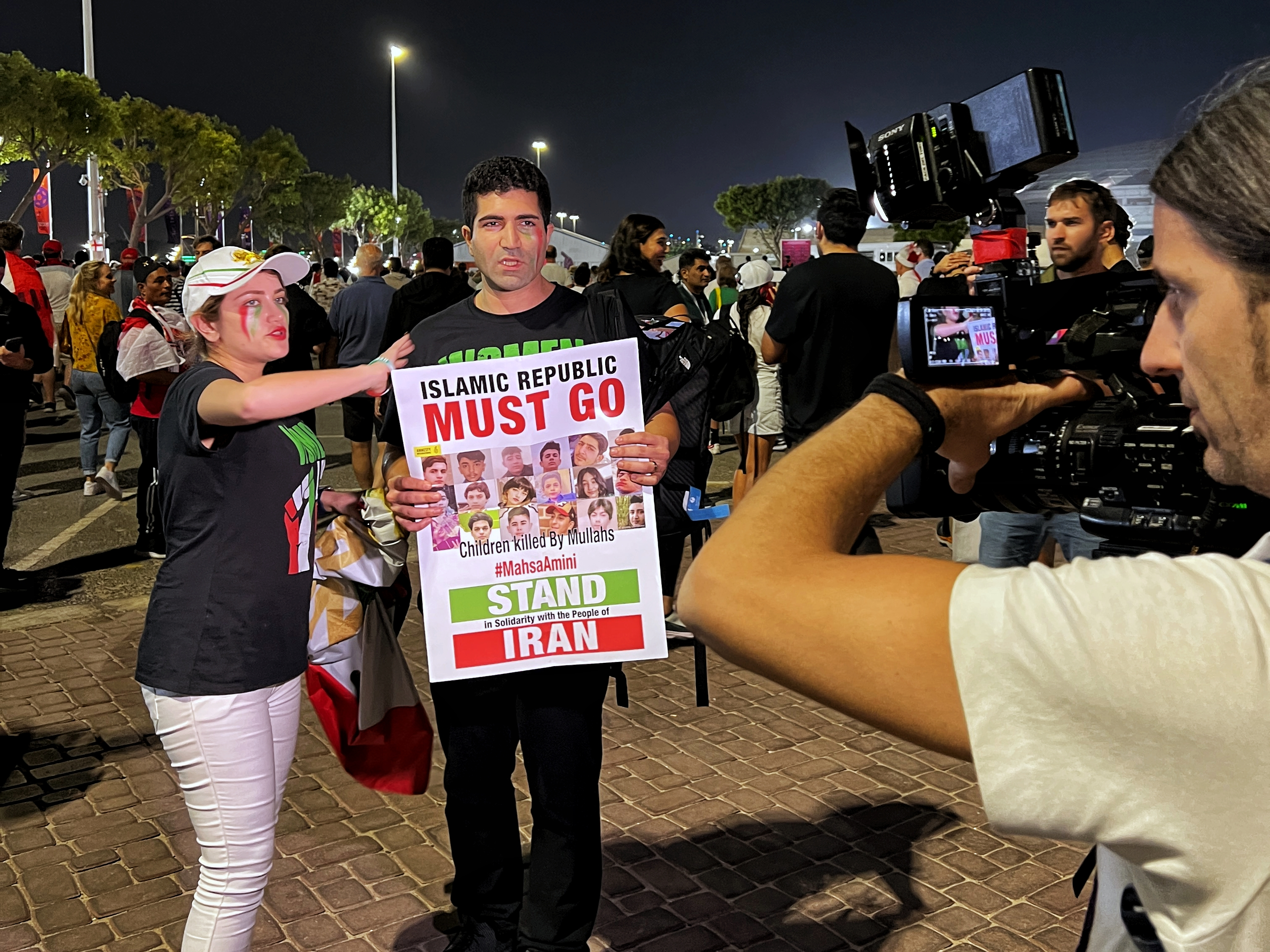
An Iranian fan with a protest banner at the 2022 FIFA World Cup

In October 2022, calls were made to ban the Iranian national team from the World Cup for the Iranian government's blocking of Iranian women from their stadiums, their supplying of weapons to Russia during the invasion of Ukraine, and the treatment towards protesters during the Mahsa Amini protests.

Since the 1979 Iranian Revolution, the presence of Iranian women in Iranian stadiums had been illegal until October 2019 after the death of Sahar Khodayari, when select Iranian women were allowed to enter the stadium after 40 years for a World Cup qualifier. However, in March 2022, Iranian women were again banned from entering the stadium for a World Cup qualifier, with authorities using pepper spray to disperse them.

Former Iranian national team goalkeeper Sosha Makani called on fans to either boycott the event or create slogans and chants that highlight the Iranian government's involvement of the deaths of protestors Nika Shakarami, Hadis Najafi, Asra Panahi and Sarina Esmailzadeh to prevent the government from using footage of them in the stands as propaganda, while ex-wrestling champion Sardar Pashaei called for a full ban of the national team until the government steps down.

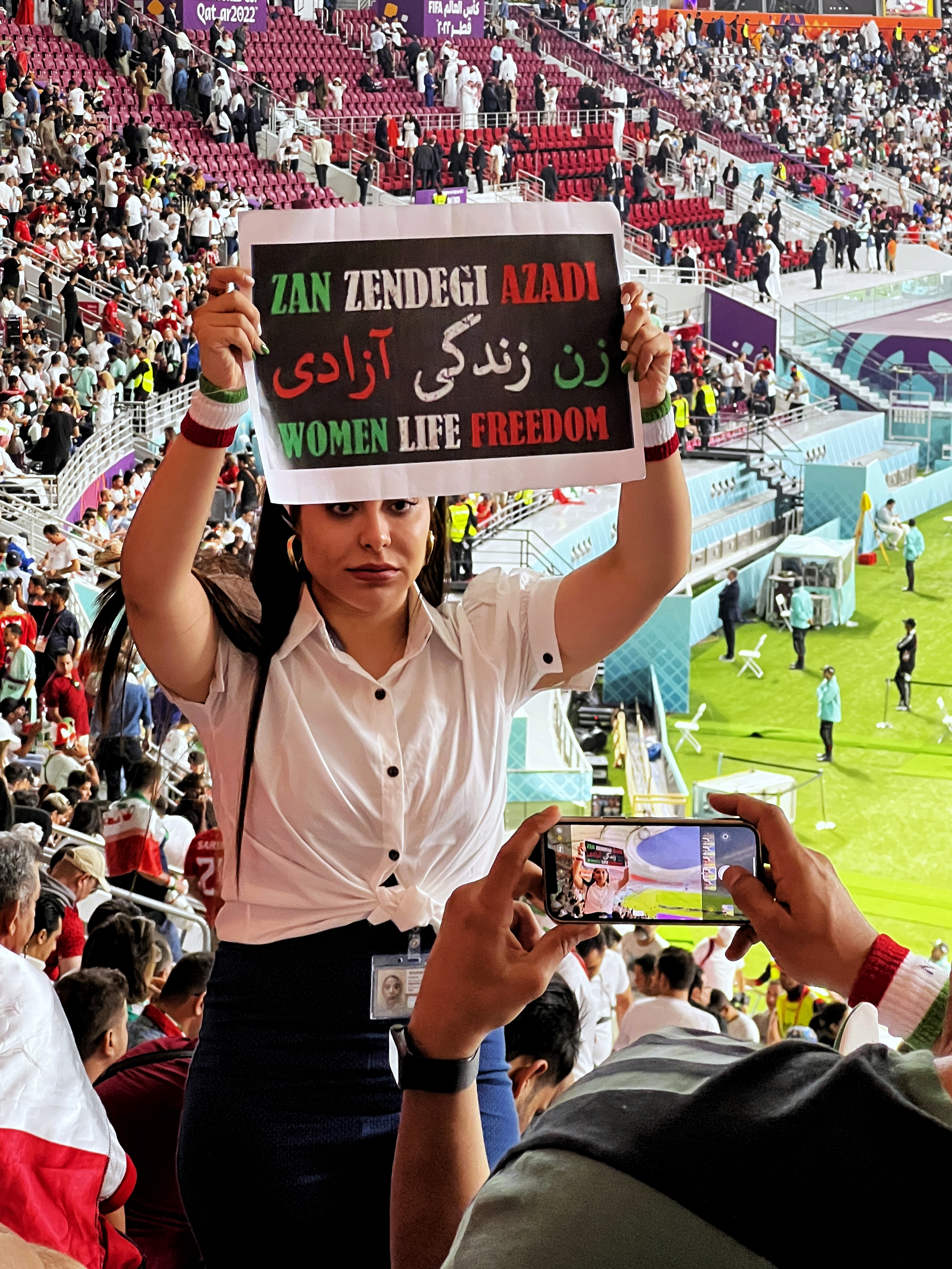
An Iranian fan showing a banner with the "Woman, Life, Freedom" slogan during the England vs Iran match

In early November 2022, the Welsh government stated they would boycott the Group B Wales vs Iran match due to the protests in Iran.

Ahead of the country's opening game (Group B England vs Iran match), many Iranians boycotted their team as they felt it was representing the government. Ahead of that opening game against England, the Iranian team refused to sing the national anthem in solidarity with the Mahsa Amini protests, with some Iranian supporters cheering against their own team or boycotting their team as a result.

In the following match against Wales, amidst the boos and whistles from the Iranian supporters during the playing of the national anthem, the Iranian players were filmed singing the national anthem, with some protestors having their pre-revolutionary Lion and Sun flags and Women, Life, Freedom banners snatched from them by pro-government fans and stadium security at the Ahmad bin Ali Stadium. Security guards at the Ahmad bin Ali Stadium seized a flag with the inscription "Woman. Freedom. Life" from an Iranian fan before the Group B game between Iran and Wales. Reuters reported on several incidents involving Iranian fans at this game, including a man wearing a shirt emblazoned with the words "Women, Life, Freedom" being escorted by three security officers into the ground, but was unable to confirm why he was being given a security escort, as well as a Reuters photograph which showed a woman whose face was painted with dark red tears holding a shirt in the air with "Mahsa Amini - 22" on it. Another Iranian fan told Reuters that her friends had been prevented from entering the stadium due to their efforts to bring T-shirts reading "Women Life Freedom" but that she had managed to get one T-shirt through the security blanket outside the stadium. Protesters were harassed by government supporters with some protesters being detained by Qatari police, while stadium security confirmed they were given orders to confiscate anything but the flag of the Islamic Republic of Iran. Protesters against the regime covered the lenses of security cameras with sanitary pads. One Iranian fan said Qatari police insisted she wash away the markings on her arms and chest, which commemorated those who had been killed by Iranian security forces. Documents obtained by Iran International showed Iran was coordinating secret efforts with Qatar to control who attends the World Cup and restrict any signs of dissent.

Prior to what would be Iran's final fixture (Group B Iran vs United States match), Iran's state-run media called for the US team to be expelled from the tournament after the US Soccer Federation removed the Islamic Republic emblem from Iran's flag in a social media post. The US Federation confirmed it had done so to show support for Iranian protesters before deleting the post. FIFA did not comment on the issue.

Ahead of that concluding fixture against the United States, the Iranian players were reportedly called in to a meeting with members of the IRGC and threatened with violence and the torture of their families if they did not sing the national anthem or joined the protests against the Iranian regime. During the match, the Iranian players sang the national anthem again before losing to the United States 1–0 for the first time in their history, thereby being knocked out of the tournament. Many Iranians celebrated the defeat and one Iranian man was killed by security forces in Iran after honking his car horn in celebration. Another Iranian fan was arrested by Qatari police after he was wearing a shirt with the Woman, Life, Freedom slogan. Qatari police also stopped people from carrying the old Iranian flag and other banners.

After the World Cup, it was revealed that the Iranian government had dispatched paid members of the Basij and IRGC to cheer for the team in the stands at both the World Cup and the Asian Cup in order to counter the protesters.

== Treatment of fans ==
=== Jewish and Israeli fans ===
It was reported that Qatar went back on its word to provide cooked kosher food and public Jewish prayer services at the 2022 World Cup, banning both activities. Qatar alleged that they could not "secure" the safety of publicly praying Jewish tourists, whilst many foreign Jews complained that they subsequently had no food available to eat. It was estimated that 10,000 religious Jews from Israel and around the world arrived to watch the World Cup in Qatar.

Multiple Israeli reporters at the tournament reported fans from Arab nations waving Palestinian flags and chanting anti-Israeli slogans. Some Israelis reported that they had been escorted out of restaurants when their nationality was revealed. The Israeli government warned its citizens who are travelling to the tournament to hide their Israeli identity out of safety concerns. Moav Vardi of Kan 11 stated that Arab fan chants included, "You are not welcome here, there is only Palestine, there is no such thing as Israel, Israel does not exist", with some turning back when the Israeli reporters disclosed their nationality. Muslims and Morocco football team players also raised Palestinian flags during the matches.

=== Paid fans ===
In 2020, Qatar began a fan engagement program promising to pay air travel, entrance tickets to matches, housing and even spending money for groups of fans from all competing nations. However, fans who are handpicked by the Qatari government are required to sing and chant when asked to, and are required to report any social media posts which are critical of Qatar. Many fans reportedly declined the offer. On 18 November 2022, it was reported that Qatar had cancelled the daily spending allowances for fans who were paid to attend the World Cup.

Days prior to the start of the 2022 FIFA World Cup, Qatar was accused of reportedly having paid actors to play the role of fans at the tournament in order to promote the country. Qatar was similarly accused of having paid for supporters when it hosted the 2015 World Men's Handball Championship.

During the World Cup, Nejmeh SC ultras from Lebanon were employed by the Qatari government to act as Qatar national team fans during their games. The 1,500 "adopted" ultras wore maroon t-shirts with "Qatar" stamped on front, sang the Qatari national anthem and beat drums while singing chants. According to the investigation by DW news in November 2022, this was a part of world cup networking program called as the Fan Leader Network which is aimed at "individuals who are passionate about football and keen to share key information with their friends and contacts about Qatar's hosting of the FIFA World Cup 2022.” According to the Southern Sydney news site The Leader, the initiative involves about 1,600 fans from around the world as a part of this network. When asked about the ultras from Lebanon, the Supreme Committee denied that the fans were paid in exchange for "coordinated promotion for the World Cup" and issued a statement describing the report as "absolutely false.” The DW fact check team claimed that they were unable to find any evidence that the fans shown in the videos had been paid for participating in the marches.

=== Accommodation ===
In the days leading up to the tournament, videos emerged of the tournament accommodation, which consisted of shipping containers, some with a curtain leading to the exterior instead of four solid walls, and portable air conditioners. This accommodation cost over $200 a night. A Greek salad which costs $10, consisting of a small amount of lettuce, one slice of cucumber, and no feta, served in a foam container was criticised as expensive and unpalatable. These criticisms led to comparisons to the ill-fated Fyre Festival. One official fan village, comprising hundreds of shipping containers, still resembled a building site less than two days before the first World Cup match. People who had stayed in another village complained about the air conditioning and beds: "It has been hell. The air con in the cabin barely works and sounds like a [fighter jet] is taking off.... [The beds] are rock hard so you might as well sleep on the floor." However, article published by CNN during the World Cup claimed that the supporters who were on a budget and were unable to afford what's on offer from hotels, eight fan villages provide “casual camping and cabin-style” options. “There are so many cabins and containers and there's a big screen that we can all watch the games together.” Fei Peng, from China, who was there to watch over 30 World Cup games, told CNN Sport.

Due to these issues, which Qatar officials say were caused by "owner and operator negligence", Qatar offered refunds to fans "severely impacted" by the issues.

=== Provisions inside stadium ===
==== Brass band instrument confiscation ====
Though not connected to any protest against Iran, the official Wales brass band had their instruments confiscated before the Group B Wales vs Iran match. The brass band had been allowed to play at the previous Wales match (against the United States) and FIFA officially supported their attendance at the tournament.

=== Ticketing ===
Many England supporters missed the start of the Group B England vs Iran match due to problems with FIFA's ticketing app. That day also, the FIFA app caused tickets belonging to fans of the United States team to disappear.

There were problems also with ticketing, first before, and then during, throughout, the Round of 16 Morocco vs Spain match on 6 December, including with FIFA's ticketing app.

== Media incidents ==
=== Security interference ===
Prior to the tournament, there were several reported incidents of altercations between broadcasters and Qatari security officials. Rasmus Tantholdt of Denmark's TV 2 was interrupted by a group of security guards during a live broadcast from the Katara Cultural Village, who threatened him and attempted to break their camera. Tantholdt responded to the group, saying "You have invited the whole world here. Why can't we film? It is a public place." Organisers apologised for the incident, claiming that it was a mistake.

RTÉ journalist Tony O'Donoghue accused Qatari police of stopping him during efforts to film in the country on 17 November.

While the tournament was underway, Argentine television presenter Joaquín 'Pollo' Álvarez was intercepted by heavy-handed Qatari forces while he was in the middle of a live TV broadcast in a street of Barwa Village, a complex in Doha specifically designed for Qatar's hosting of the tournament. Álvarez was interviewing an old supported in a wheelchair, when he was stopped by Qatari forces, who asked him if he was an accredited media representative. When he was searching for his press pass in his bag, an official became irritated and ordered the cameraman to stop filming, claiming that the street was "private". Álvarez said that the official threatened to arrest him, saying "I was frightened and thought they were going to take me prisoner... It's impossible to work and enjoy a World Cup like this".

The film crew were also threatened with the destruction of their equipment. Nicolás Magaldi, who was co-hosting the live broadcast from the TV studio in Argentina's capital Buenos Aires, told viewers: "This is an example of severe censorship and we have to say so. They covered up the camera, didn't let us film, ordered you away in a rude fashion, and on top of that, the person doing the talking didn't identify himself".

=== Grant Wahl's death ===
American soccer journalist Grant Wahl collapsed and died while covering the Netherlands vs. Argentina match in the early morning of 10 December 2022.

Wahl had experienced cold-like symptoms in the days prior, but felt better following a course of treatment from the World Cup medical centre. An outspoken critic of Qatar's selection as World Cup host, Wahl had been briefly detained while wearing a t-shirt depicting a rainbow at an earlier game during the tournament (United States vs Wales). Wahl reportedly received death threats for wearing the shirt, and his brother said he believes Wahl's death was the result of foul play, implicating the Qatari government as playing a role. Other journalists with Wahl at the time of his death have reported that he did not collapse but instead began fitting or experiencing a seizure, and called for help himself. They have criticised the Qatar Supreme Committee for not providing defibrillators in the stadium, as they had looked for one to try to help Wahl. In response, FIFA said that according to the ambulance service, a defibrillator was made available when paramedics later arrived on scene. An autopsy done on Wahl in New York City later revealed that Wahl died from an aortic aneurysm rupture. Grant Wahl's brother later backtracked on his statement on the cause of his brother's death and stated he no longer suspects foul play.

=== Chinese censorship ===
CCTV, the state broadcaster and the official broadcaster of FIFA World Cup in mainland China, replaced footage of maskless audiences with close-ups of coaches, officials or players, or birds-eye view of stadiums in its broadcast, as scenes of maskless audiences fuelled unrest with China's zero-COVID policy during ongoing protests. Following the protests, the Chinese government began to relax pandemic control measures and more images of audience without masks appeared on live telecast.

=== Algerian censorship ===
State-run TV2 of Algeria avoided coverage of the Group F Belgium vs Morocco match and Morocco's subsequent win, due to tensions between Algeria and Morocco. In addition, Algeria's state TV channel and the Algeria Press Service never mentioned Morocco's defeating Spain in the round of 16, although many Algerians celebrated Morocco's victory.

Although the reason has not been revealed, a few hours after the result of Morocco defeated Portugal in the quarter-final was shown on TV3, the director general of Public Establishment of Television, Chabane Lounakel was dismissed by the Algerian government.

=== Western media coverage perceived as racist ===
Middle East Eye, a web news portal accused of being funded and operated by Qatar, though the nation denies this, has described several Western media publications as racist, and criticised the nations from which they originate. It highlighted the French satirical newspaper Le Canard enchaîné, which published a cartoon of bearded men wearing Qatar football jerseys holding knives, guns, and rocket launchers; and the German television network Welt, on which a presenter described the Tawhid Islamic salute performed by Moroccan players after they defeated Portugal as "the signature hand gesture of members of ISIS".

Also on Welt, former footballer Jimmy Hartwig used the word "Ching Chang Chong" and made a bow as typical Japanese do to describe the Japanese squad, and also called Japan "Reisabteilung", which means "rice department". After this, he was criticised for discrimination against Asians especially among Japanese people in Germany.

E-newsletter Morocco World News criticised Danish television network TV 2, which it said was racist for a panel of presenters comparing the way Moroccan players reached over spectators to embrace their mothers to monkeys huddling, while the blog site Al Bawaba saw someone post criticism of Dutch newspaper de Volkskrant for printing on the day of their semi-final, a cartoon of Morocco players with shaved heads taking the World Cup trophy from Infantino.

=== BBC controversies ===
Hassan Al Thawadi, the head of the Qatar World Cup, called some of the BBC's coverage of the tournament "extremely racist" and charged Gary Lineker with not engaging with the organisers before criticising them directly. The BBC said it had received more than 1,000 complaints about its coverage of the World Cup opener between hosts Qatar and Ecuador, and some users described the BBC's coverage of the World Cup as "racist". Al Thawadi said since February, he had tried several times to have a meeting between the officials organising the World Cup and the hosts and pundits of the BBC, especially Lineker, but there was never any desire to listen to the Qatari side of the story. He claimed that Lineker never wanted to engage. In response to Al Thawadi, Lineker tweeted that he and his representative had not received any requests to engage with anyone involved in Qatar 2022. The Daily Telegraph reported on emails showing efforts to arrange a meeting between Al Thawadi and BBC hosts and pundits ahead of the World Cup draw in April. A BBC spokesperson denied Al Thawadi's claims and said they had a duty to cover legitimate issues related to the World Cup without fear or favour. Lineker would go on to end his commentary of the tournament by stating that the United States, one of the co-hosts of the following World Cup, is “extraordinarily racist” in an attempt to show that he was willing to criticise any host country and had not only singled out Qatar for its issues while also mentioning that “every country has problems”.

On 19 November 2022, Jürgen Klinsmann, accused Iran of cheating in their 2–0 win over Wales whilst appearing as a pundit on the BBC. He stated that cheating in football matches is in Iranian culture. Referring to the referee's Guatemala nationality, he claimed that the result of the Iran and Wales match would have been different had the referee been from Europe. After his comments, Gabby Logan, the broadcast host, also mentioned that the linesman was also from Trinidad and Tobago.

=== Israeli media ===
Israeli journalists tried to interview some Arab people but they were ignored and the interviewees just walked away once the former's nationality became known.

== Boycotts ==
Tromsø IL of Norway released a statement calling for a boycott of the 2022 World Cup, in relation to reports of "modern-day slavery" and the "alarming number of deaths", among additional concerns in their statement. The club urged the Norwegian Football Federation to support such a boycott.

In reaction to the 2017 Qatar diplomatic crisis, Reinhard Grindel, the president of the German Football Association, stated in June 2017 that "the football associations of the world should conclude that major tournaments cannot be held in countries with human rights abuses and that the German Football Association would talk with UEFA and the Cabinet of Germany in order to evaluate whether to boycott the tournament in Qatar in 2022. On 26 March 2021, the German Football Association stated that it was opposed to boycotting the tournament but that its players will campaign for improvement of human rights for all. On the same day, Belgium manager Roberto Martínez told CNN that it would be a "big mistake" to boycott the event.

On 20 October 2021, the German Football Association (DFB) published an interview on its website that confirmed that Germany would not boycott the 2022 World Cup in Qatar. According to vice-president Peter Peters, "Qatar has seen many positive developments in the past few years, and it is football's role to support those developments."

In October 2022, it was announced Paris had joined other French cities in boycotting the broadcasting of the 2022 tournament amid concerns over rights violations of migrant workers and the environmental impact of the tournament, despite the fact that Paris Saint-Germain, the city's Ligue 1 team, is owned by the Qatari government.

In November 2022, fans of Borussia Dortmund, Bayern Munich, and Hertha BSC unveiled banners calling for a boycott of the Qatar World Cup.

Cologne-based supermarket chain REWE cut all ties with the German Football Association (DFB) with immediate effect on 23 November as the company's CEO Lionel Souque moved to disassociate them from the sport, calling FIFA's actions in the early days of the tournament "scandalous", and even electing to waive its pre-existing advertising rights.

== Match incidents ==
=== Serbian incidents ===
During the Group G Serbia vs Switzerland match on 2 December, midfielder Granit Xhaka twice provoked the entire Serbian team. First, in the 65th minute, Xhaka grabbed his crotch in the direction of Serbian players, causing the entire Serbian bench to angrily respond to him and Serbian reserve goalkeeper Predrag Rajković being booked. Second, at the end of the match, Xhaka got into a fight against Nikola Milenković for his chants against Serbians, with both players going into the referee's book.

Many Serbian fans displayed slogans and attire related to the Yugoslav Wars, such as "Serbia to Tokyo", and made racist chants and gestures toward Albanians during the second half of the game. Between the two incidents between Xhaka and the Serbian players, FIFA issued a public address in the 77th minute of the game asking for "discriminatory chants and gestures" to stop. Also, according to a Kosovo Albanian fan, his Albanian flag around his neck was confiscated at the entrance before the game. Another fan was escorted out of the game by members of security after doing the Albanian double-headed eagle celebration.

Furthermore, Xhaka, an ethnic Albanian, enraged Serbian fans by wearing a jersey with the surname of Jashari written on it while celebrating after having won the match. Despite his claims that he wore the jersey to show support to his young Switzerland teammate Ardon Jashari, Serbian fans and media interpreted the move as glorification of Adem Jashari, a Kosovo Albanian soldier who founded the Kosovo Liberation Army during the Kosovo War, and who is seen as a national hero amongst Albanians but as a terrorist amongst Serbs.

FIFA later opened a disciplinary proceeding against Serbia over the breach of three of FIFA's articles, including misconduct of players, discrimination, and order and security at matches.

=== Croatian incidents ===
Xenophobic chants were reported during the course of the Group F Croatia vs Canada match on 27 November. During the match, Croatian fans chanted xenophobic anti-Serb slogans against Canadian goalkeeper Milan Borjan, an ethnic Croatian Serb who fled Croatia during the Croatian War of Independence. They also displayed a modified John Deere banner making a reference to Operation Storm, a military operation that ended the war and abolished the separatist proto-state Republic of Serbian Krajina, which resulted in a mass exodus and war crimes against number of Krajina's Serb civilians. Serbs generally consider it an act of ethnic cleansing, however, in a controversial decision, the ICTY appeals court in the 2012 final verdict ruled that "there had been no joint criminal enterprise, or conspiracy, to force out the Serbs from the Krajina region." Borjan's phone number was leaked among Croatian fans who sent him over 2,500 hateful messages during and after the game. His wife was also insulted during the game and targeted with hateful massages on social platforms just like him.

The incident was also preceded by Borjan's statement that he was "born in Krajina" and "not Croatia", while characterising the historical Croatian region of Dalmatia as Serbian which Croatians considered a nationalist and irredentist claim. Republika Srpska Krajina was a separatist state created by Croatian Serbs in 1991 where ethnic cleansing of Croats was carried out.

FIFA opened a disciplinary measure against Croatia over these incidents after the Canadian Soccer Association filed a complaint. On 7 December, the Croatian Football Federation was fined 50,000 Swiss francs due to violating article 16 of the FIFA Disciplinary Code.

FIFA hit Croatia with another fine of 5,000 Swiss francs for the inappropriate behaviour (use of banners with inappropriate content) before the match against Morocco, played on 17 December.

=== Pitch invasions ===
A pitch invader, carrying a rainbow flag and wearing a shirt with the words “RESPECT FOR IRANIAN WOMAN” written on the back and “SAVE UKRAINE” written on the front, interrupted the Group H Portugal vs Uruguay match on 28 November.

Another person interrupted the Group D Tunisia vs France match on 30 November by running into the pitch carrying a Palestinian flag.

=== Japan goal versus Spain ===
In the Group E Japan vs Spain match, on 1 December, Japan midfielder Ao Tanaka scored a controversial goal (his team's second), the ball ending up in Unai Simón's net shortly after it seemed to have gone out of play. After a lengthy delay the goal was eventually awarded by VAR. The decision proved critical in both Japan's surprise topping of Group E and the elimination of Germany from the tournament, with Die Mannschaft finishing third despite securing a 4–2 victory over Costa Rica in the group's other game. An image was later released showing that the ball had not fully crossed the line, by the narrowest of margins. Qatari-owned network beIN Sports showed a virtual bird's eye view of the ball: the section of the ball which was in contact with the pitch was outside the field of play, but its curvature meant the side of the ball was still marginally over the line. Spain's coach Luis Enrique claimed that the image had been "manipulated". On December 3, FIFA released video and images to provide an official explanation to show that the VAR decision was correct.

=== Netherlands vs Argentina quarter-final ===
Spanish referee Antonio Mateu Lahoz officiated the second quarter-final, held on 9 December, a game between the Netherlands and Argentina. Mateu Lahoz's decision-making throughout this game was called into question by many of those involved, as well as by neutral observers. BBC presenter Gary Lineker at one point during the game commented: "13 yellow cards. This referee has always loved to be the centre of attention. Makes Mike Dean seem shy." Ultimately, Mateu Lahoz produced a FIFA World Cup record of 18 yellow cards, including two people who were sitting on the bench and thus not involved in the game. After the end of the game, Mateu Lahoz issued a red card to Netherlands player Denzel Dumfries, however, no TV commentator picked up on this, leaving viewers who checked the match reports afterward puzzled. During the extra time period (which resulted from Netherlands striker Wout Weghorst scoring an equalising goal with the last kick of normal time, which itself went on for ten minutes extra due to the number of stoppages), BBC commentator Martin Keown remarked: "I think the referee is losing the plot here."

Earlier, and with Argentina giving up a two-goal lead to leave the score at 2–2, Argentina's Leandro Paredes fouled his opponent Nathan Aké. Paredes responded to the referee's whistle by angrily kicking the ball at the Dutch bench on which staff and players were seated. Enraged Dutch staff and players poured onto the pitch, followed by Argentine staff and players, sparking an on-pitch brawl featuring players and substitutes. Netherlands captain Virgil van Dijk was seen charging forward and knocking Paredes to the ground. Given the general confusion surrounding the game's total of yellow cards and several contradictions when various match reports are viewed, it is unclear how many players Mateu Lahoz booked in this one incident.

After the game Lionel Messi asked FIFA to expel Mateu Lahoz. Messi also criticised the Netherlands manager: "Louis van Gaal says they play good football, but what he did was put tall people and spam long balls" and blamed Mateu Lahoz for causing the game to go on longer than it should have: "The referee sent us into extra time". The referee's decision not to show the yellow card to Messi for a deliberate handball also attracted comment, though Messi was eventually booked in the 10th minute of injury time at the end of the second half, at which point he would have been sent off with a red card if he had been booked for the earlier foul. Argentina's goalkeeper Emiliano Martínez described Mateu Lahoz as "crazy, the worst referee of the tournament, he is arrogant. You say something to him and he talks back to you badly. I think since Spain went out [to Morocco in the Round of 16] he wanted us to go out as well".

Before Argentine player Lautaro Martínez started walking to kick his penalty shot, several Dutch players started to surround him, in an attempt to psych him out, even though a player is supposed to go to kick the shot alone. He would later go on to score Argentina's decisive shot, that qualified them to the semi-finals. Immediately following the penalty shoot-out victory, several Argentina players goaded the losing Netherlands players, e.g. Nicolás Otamendi raised his hands behind his ears, Leandro Paredes and Gonzalo Montiel gestured directly at them, while Alexis Mac Allister, Germán Pezzella and Ángel Di María screamed at their beaten opponents, action harshly shunned by some foreign commentators and claimed as misunderstood by some others. However, the next day, an overhead camera recorded the incident between Martínez and the chasing Dutch players.

Messi, while giving a post-match interview, said to Wout Weghorst: "What are you looking at, fool? Go away, go back there."

== Post-match incidents ==
=== "No Surrender" Kosovo flag ===
Shortly after the Group G Brazil vs Serbia match on 24 November, a flag showing Kosovo as being part of Serbia with words "Нема предаје" (transl. No surrender) was seen hanging in Serbia's locker room. The flag was also displayed by fans during the game. The Football Association of Kosovo sued the Football Association of Serbia and urged FIFA to open an investigation. On 26 November 2022, FIFA opened proceedings against the Football Association of Serbia due on the basis of article 11 of the FIFA Disciplinary Code and article 4 of the Regulations for the FIFA World Cup 2022. The Football Association of Serbia was subsequently fined 20,000 Swiss francs by FIFA on 7 December.

=== Moroccan riots ===
Following the Group F Belgium vs Morocco match, in which Morocco unexpectedly defeated Belgium on 27 November, Moroccan fans began to riot in the Belgian cities of Brussels, Antwerp and Liege, and in the Dutch cities of Rotterdam, Amsterdam, Utrecht, Amersfoort and The Hague. At least twelve people were detained and two police officers were injured. Riot police attempted to break up a group of 500 football supporters in Rotterdam while media reported unrest in Amsterdam and The Hague.

Following the semi-final match between Morocco and France, clashes erupted between Moroccan and French fans in several French cities, with one 14-year-old boy being killed in Montpellier. Meanwhile, in the Netherlands, 14 Moroccan fans were arrested in the city of Rotterdam amidst the unrest, while Dutch officials opted against public screenings of the game due to the previous unrest from the Morocco vs Belgium match.

=== Uruguayans after Ghana game ===
The Group H Ghana vs Uruguay match on 2 December finished in a 2–0 victory for Uruguay; however, Uruguay failed to progress from the group. After the final whistle, several Uruguayan players confronted the referee and other FIFA officials over what they deemed as controversial decisions during the course of the game, and while walking down the tunnel towards the dressing rooms, Edinson Cavani pushed over the VAR monitor.

After the tournament ended, FIFA banned Fernando Muslera and José María Giménez each for four international games and ordered them to pay fines of €20,000. Meanwhile, Edinson Cavani and Diego Godín must serve one international game ban each and must pay fines of €15,000. All four players are also ordered to take part in a form of community service. The Uruguayan football federation was also fined €43,800 and will have to play one home fixture with a reduced capacity. The punishments received are reminiscent of the one that Luis Suárez received in 2014 after biting Italian defender Giorgio Chiellini.

=== Samuel Eto'o assault ===
Following the Group G Cameroon vs Brazil match on 2 December, Samuel Eto'o assaulted a man outside Stadium 974. A video circulated on social media of the former Cameroon international and Barcelona player, who was Cameroonian Football Federation president, attacking the man. Eto'o said himself, in a statement issued later that week, that it was a "violent altercation", that it was "an unfortunate incident" and that his victim was "probably" a fan of Algeria.

=== Argentina–France final ===
After Argentina's win in the final, Qatari Emir Sheikh Tamim bin Hamad Al Thani presented an Arab cloak, a bisht, to Lionel Messi. In Qatar, using a bisht traditionally display a high status, used by royals. Some people criticised the gesture, saying it marred the moment when Messi lifted the World Cup; BBC host Gary Lineker said it was "a shame they've covered his shirt" during "a magic moment". However, fan and media reactions were mixed, with some commentators describing journalists who criticised the bisht presentation as salty.

Argentine goalkeeper Emiliano Martínez, after winning the Golden glove trophy (which resembles a giant hand), placed it on his groin and pointed towards fans in front of the FIFA president and Qatari Emir, which some detractors saw as a vulgar gesture.

Turkish celebrity Nusret Gökçe was seen on the pitch, intruding to talk to the Argentine players, despite the clear discomfort of the players around him. He was also behaving inappropriately around the World Cup trophy and taking medals from the Argentines to bite into it.

== See also ==
- List of FIFA World Cup controversies
