= Association football at the 1956 Summer Olympics – Men's qualification =

1956 Summer Olympics – Men's Football Qualifiers
Tournament details
- Dates: 23 October 1955 – 31 July 1956
- Teams: 20

Tournament statistics
- Matches played: 10
- Goals scored: 46 (4.6 per match)

The men's qualification for the association football tournament at the 1956 Summer Olympics was the first time the qualifying round was done on a home-and-away basis.

The 1955-1956 pre-Olympic football tournament selected 15 of the 16 nations that qualified for the 1956 Melbourne Olympic Games. This marked the first time the preliminary round was held before the Olympics. The overwhelming number of registrants exceeded the Olympic tournament’s capacity to be organized within the Olympic fortnight.

As long as the total number of registrants remained below 32, the Olympic tournament followed a consistent pattern since 1924. It involved a preliminary round to reduce the number of teams to sixteen, followed by the round of 16, quarterfinals, semifinals, and medal finals.

However, the first home-and-away Olympic football preliminary round was not yet assigned to the respective continental federations. Only 37 countries from five continents had registered.

An Olympic commission within FIFA, led by Dutchman Karel Lotsy, Englishman Stanley Rous, and Swiss Kurt Gassmann, supervised the pre-Olympic tournament. On June 13, 1955, a draw in Amsterdam determined the pairings, considering geographical regions. Australia, the organizing country, was automatically qualified. Poland, India, and Thailand received byes, while several nations withdrew, leaving 20 countries to compete in the qualifying matches from October 23, 1955, to July 31, 1956. The matches were distributed across four continents: 9 European, 1 American, 8 Asian, and 2 African teams.

A new draw at the end of May 1956 was necessary to ensure that the 15 qualifications required were obtained because, in the meantime, several countries had forfeited during the playoffs: Poland, although qualified directly by drawing lots, renounced participation in the Olympic tournament; Romania; Mexico; Afghanistan; Iran; the Philippines; and Taiwan. As a result, it was decided that the loser of the match between Bulgaria and Great Britain, in this case the latter, would also qualify.

== Qualified teams ==
† Withdrew after qualifying

Team	Method of qualification	Previous best performance
Australia	Hosts	–
~~Poland~~ †	~~Automatic qualification~~	Fourth place (1936)
Bulgaria	Bulgaria v Great Britain winner	Round of 16 (1924, 1952)
Yugoslavia	Yugoslavia v Romania winner	Silver medal (1948, 1952)
~~Hungary~~ †	~~Hungary v East Germany winner~~	Gold medal (1952)
~~Turkey~~ †	~~Turkey v West Germany winner~~	Quarter-finals (1948, 1952)
~~West Germany~~ †	~~Turkey v West Germany winner~~	–
Soviet Union	Soviet Union v Israel winner	First round (1952)
~~Egypt~~ †	~~Ethiopia v Egypt winner~~	Fourth place (1928)
~~South Vietnam~~ †	~~South Vietnam v Cambodia winner~~	–
India	India v Thailand winner	First round (1948)
Thailand	India v Thailand winner	–
Japan	Japan v South Korea winner	Quarter-finals (1936)
~~China~~ †	~~China v Philippines winner~~	First round (1936, 1948)
Indonesia	Indonesia v Taiwan winner	–
United States	United States v Mexico winner	Silver medal (1904)
United Team of Germany	Formation by West Germany and East Germany	Fourth place (1952)
Great Britain	replaced Poland	Gold medal (1900, 1908, 1912)

== Format ==
The final tournament had 16 spots reserved, with 28 countries initially showing interest in the tournament.

Automatic qualification was granted to Australia (host), Poland, Turkey, and United Team of Germany (originally as West Germany).

- Europe: 4 places, contested by 8 teams (including Israel).
- Africa: 1 place, contested by 2 teams.
- Asia: 6 places, contested by 12 teams.
- Americas: 1 place, contested by 2 teams.

== Africa ==
Team 1	Agg.	Team 2	1st leg	2nd leg
Ethiopia	3–9	Egypt	1–4	2–5

== Asia ==
Team 1	Agg.	Team 2	1st leg	2nd leg
South Vietnam	9–5	Cambodia	5–2	4–3
Iran	n/p^{1}	Afghanistan	—	—
India	bye^{2}	Thailand	—	—
Japan	2–2^{3}	South Korea	2–0	0–2
China	w/o^{4}	Philippines	—	—
Indonesia	w/o^{5}	Taiwan	—	—

^{1} Both teams withdrew; the tie was scratched.
^{2} As the withdrawal of other teams left six winners, the tie was scratched and both teams qualified automatically.
^{3} Both matches were played in Japan due to the lack of a suitable stadium in South Korea; Japan advanced on the drawing of lots.
^{4} Philippines withdrew.
^{5} Republic of China withdrew after the organizing committee ruled they had to play under the FIFA flag during the first leg, due to concerns over social and political unrest in Indonesia relating to the use of the Blue Sky with a White Sun flag.

== Americas ==
Team 1	Agg.	Team 2	1st leg	2nd leg
United States	w/o^{1}	Mexico	—	—

^{1} Mexico withdrew.

== Notes on qualifying ==
Before the official draw for the final tournament on September 1, 1956, Poland withdrew and was replaced by Great Britain.

After the draw, Hungary also withdrew; its place was offered to South Korea; however, South Korea declined due to financial reasons.

Subsequently, South Vietnam and Turkey both withdrew, while the People's Republic of China and Egypt boycotted the Olympics.

== Qualifying Matches ==
11 July 1956

Ethiopia	1–4	Egypt
Goal		El-Fanagily 3', 31'; Ad-Diba 54'; Adam 60'

Haile Selassie Stadium, Addis Ababa
31 July 1956

Egypt	5–2	Ethiopia
Saleh; Attia; El-Far; Ad-Diba		Goal

Al Ahly Stadium, Cairo

3 June 1956

South Vietnam	5–2	Cambodia

10 June 1956

Cambodia	3–4	South Vietnam

3 June 1956

Japan	2–0	South Korea
Uchino 54'; Iwabuchi 77'	Report

Korakuen Velodrome, Tokyo
Attendance: 10,000
10 June 1956

Japan	0–2	South Korea
	Report	? 58' ? 64'

Korakuen Velodrome, Tokyo
Attendance: 20,000

Japan advanced by the drawing of lots.

== See also ==
- Australian football at the 1956 Summer Olympics
- 1956 Summer Olympics
