= Urs Linsi =

Swiss football administrator (born 1949)

Secretary General of FIFA
- In office 17 December 2002 – 27 June 2007
- Preceded by: Michel Zen-Ruffinen
- Succeeded by: Jérôme Valcke

Personal details
- Born: 29 June 1949 (age 76)

Urs Linsi (born 29 June 1949) is a Swiss financial manager and sports official who served as Secretary General of FIFA (2002–2007) and chairman of Grasshopper Club Zürich (2010–2011).

== Early life ==
Linsi studied economics and earned his PhD from the University of St. Gallen. He spent over 20 years at Credit Suisse, including a role as head of the leasing department.

He played football in lower amateur leagues and university teams. After a knee injury ended his playing career, he worked as a football referee for two years. In the mid-1980s, he began participating in endurance sports, and in 1988, he competed in a triathlon in Hawaii. In 1989, he founded the Powerman Zofingen, a duathlon competition event.

He joined the board of directors of Airesis in 2009 and became Chairman of the Board of Directors of Bank Sparhafen Zürich in August 2011.

== Career ==
Linsi became FIFA's Director of Finance in July 1999 and Deputy Secretary General in January 2000. On December 17, 2002, he was appointed FIFA Secretary General in Madrid, a position he held until June 2007. During his tenure, he was responsible for the financial restructuring of FIFA and the construction of the Home of FIFA.

He joined FIFA in 1999 on the recommendation of Heinz Schurtenberger, head of International Sport and Leisure (ISL), which marketed sponsorship and television rights for FIFA events until its bankruptcy in 2001. In mid-2002, he presented FIFA's financial report at an extraordinary Congress in Seoul, and played a key role in Sepp Blatter's re-election campaign. He managed to secure the Secretary General position against various competitors, becoming the fifth Swiss in a row to hold the position. As Secretary General, he oversaw the awarding of licensing rights for the 2010 and 2014 World Cups and renegotiated terms with the German Football Association for the 2006 World Cup.

In December 2005, he announced that FIFA expected a surplus of at least €110 million from the 2006 World Cup, which would significantly boost FIFA's equity base. In March 2007, he reported FIFA's annual profit for 2006 as €187 million and anticipated doubling TV revenues for the 2010 World Cup, with FIFA selling its TV rights individually for certain markets for the first time.

In 2005, his attempt to dismiss his deputy, Jérôme Champagne, failed, in addition to the dismissal of two of his confidants from FIFA's finance department in February 2006 indicated his loss of power. In July 2007, FIFA announced Linsi's dismissal, which Swiss media interpreted as a "pawn sacrifice" for Blatter's re-election. His responsibilities were temporarily handed over to Markus Kattner, FIFA's Director of Finance and Controlling. In October 2007, FIFA confirmed a severance payment of over €7 million for Linsi.

In September 2009, Linsi was appointed CEO by the board of directors of Grasshopper Club Zürich. He served as president of the club from February 2010 to April 2011.

== Controversy ==
In March 2016, the Freshfields Bruckhaus Deringer law firm's report on the German Football Association's bid for the 2006 World Cup examined Linsi's role in a controversial €6.7 million payment to Adidas boss Robert Louis-Dreyfus in April 2005. In June 2016, a Swiss news portal reported on investigations by the Swiss Federal Prosecutor's Office.

In August 2019, charges were brought against Linsi and former DFB officials Theo Zwanziger, Wolfgang Niersbach, and Horst R. Schmidt. Linsi could be facing trial for aiding tax evasion, in which the aforementioned transaction allegedly helped to repay a loan linked to Franz Beckenbauer and routed through a FIFA account. The proceedings were discontinued in 2020 due to the statute of limitations, as the trial had to be suspended due to the COVID-19 pandemic.
