= Fatma Samoura =

Senegalese FIFA Secretary General

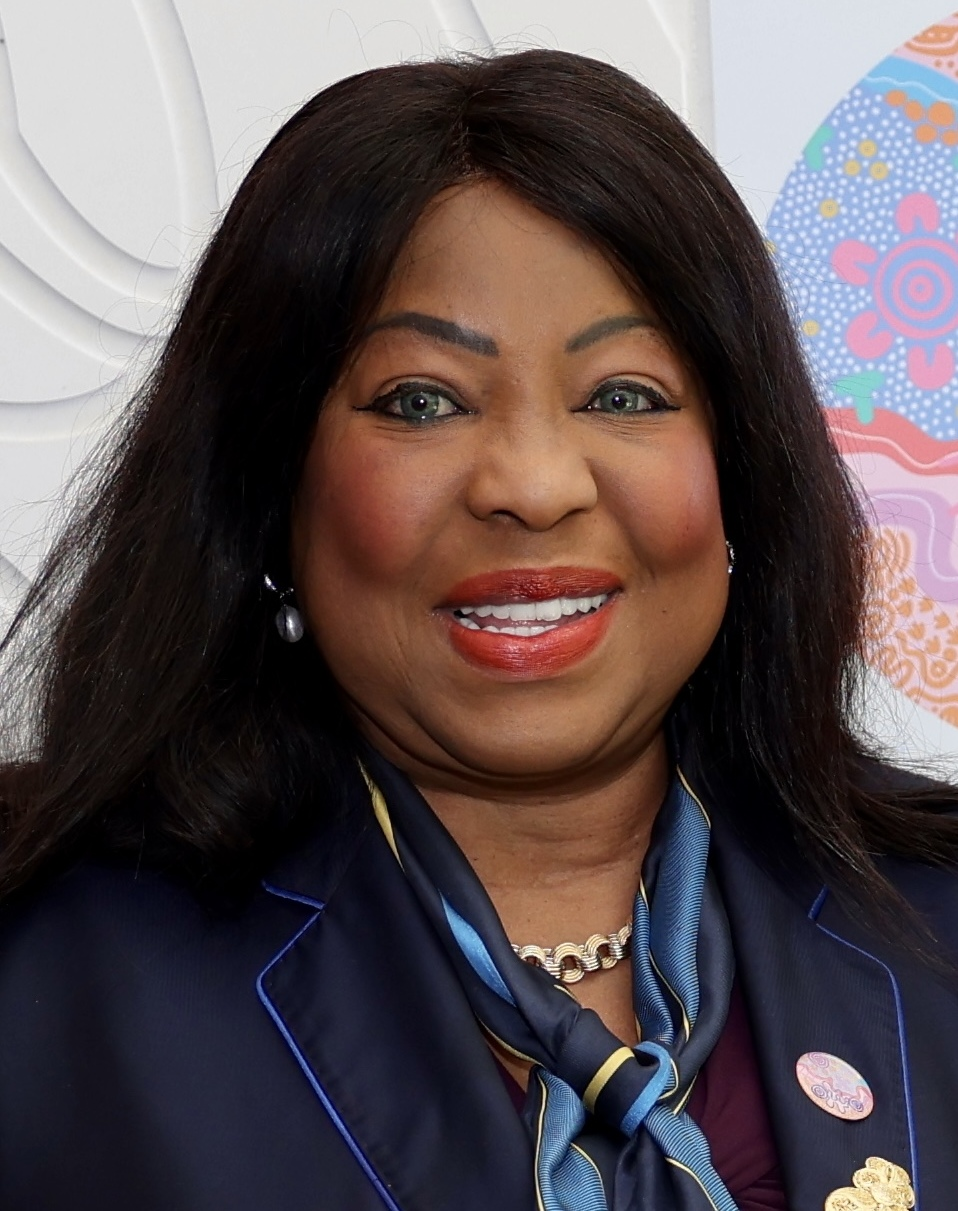
- Samoura in July 2023

Secretary General of FIFA
- In office 20 June 2016 – 31 December 2023
- Preceded by: Markus Kattner (acting)
- Succeeded by: Mattias Grafström

Personal details
- Born: 9 September 1962 (age 64) Dakar, Senegal
- Education: EM Strasbourg Business School
- Occupation: Diplomat; Executive officer

Fatma Samba Diouf Samoura (born 9 September 1962) is a Senegalese former diplomat and senior executive. She was appointed as the first female secretary general of FIFA by president Gianni Infantino and assumed her post on 20 June 2016. Previously she worked in various positions at the United Nations, mostly of a humanitarian nature. In June 2023, she tendered her resignation as secretary general, which took effect on 31 December 2023.

== Early life and education ==
Fatma Samba Diouf Samoura was born in Dakar, in the recently independent Senegal, on 9 September 1962. She is the only daughter (the second of seven children), her father, a Senegalese military man, and her mother, a teacher.

She attended the University of Lyon, attaining a master's degree in English and Spanish, and subsequently gained a postgraduate degree in international relations and trade at EM Strasbourg Business School. Her home languages are Wolof and French, and she is also fluent in English, Spanish, and Italian.

== Career ==
=== Early career ===
Samoura worked for eight years for a leading fertiliser company, occupying a position that had traditionally been taken by men.

=== UN ===
After joining the United Nations World Food Programme (WFP) at their headquarters in Rome in 1995 as a senior logistics officer, she served as Country Director for WFP in Djibouti (2000–2005) and Cameroon (2005–2007), and altogether worked in seven countries, the others being Chad, Guinea, Niger, Madagascar (United Nations Resident Coordinator and UNDP Resident Representative, 2010–2016) and Nigeria (United Nations Resident Coordinator/Humanitarian Coordinator and United Nations Development Programme Resident Representative, January–June 2016).

On 1 November 2007, UN Secretary-General Ban Ki-moon, in consultation with the Under-Secretary-General for Humanitarian Affairs John Holmes, appointed her as Deputy Humanitarian Coordinator (DHC) for eastern Chad. She was based in the town of Abéché, located approximately 80 kilometres west of the border with the Sudan's conflict-torn Darfur region. In 2007, Chad was hosting over 280,000 refugees and over 170,000 internally displaced persons, most in the eastern region, and she was tasked with working for their return. The official's functions consist in providing support and guidance to a team composed of seven United Nations agencies and over 40 international non-governmental organizations (NGOs) working in eastern Chad.

During her career at the UN, she became used to negotiating with local war lords and heads of state.

=== FIFA ===
Samoura met Gianni Infantino, president of FIFA, in 2015 in Madagascar at a qualifying match for the 2018 FIFA World Cup. When she heard that the position of secretary general of FIFA was coming up, she emailed Infantino, who appointed her as the first female secretary general of FIFA at the FIFA congress in Mexico City on 13 May 2016. She was to succeed the disgraced Jerome Valcke, who had been banned from activities relating to football for 12 years, and replaced acting Markus Kattner, who was also implicated in corruption. The role had been occupied by white men for 100 years before her appointment. On 20 June 2016 she assumed the role of FIFA secretary general, responsible for overseeing the commercial and operational side of the organisation.

Samoura declared on 3 November 2016 that players for England, Scotland, and Wales would be punished if they wore the remembrance poppy on Remembrance Day, as FIFA classes it as a political symbol. "Britain is not the only country that has been suffering as a result of war", she said. "Syria is an example. My own African continent has been torn by war for years. The only question is 'why are we doing exceptions for just one country and not the rest of the world?'". UK Prime Minister Theresa May condemned FIFA for the decision.

During her time as secretary general, Samoura oversaw the reordering of the organisational structure of FIFA in 2016, including the appointment of deputy secretaries general, and the creation of a new women's football division.

On 14 June 2023, she announced she would be stepping down as FIFA secretary general, and tendered her resignation to the president, to take effect on 31 December 2023.

In July 2023, Samoura travelled to Australia in NAIDOC Week, ahead of the 2023 FIFA Women's World Cup, learning about the culture of Australian First Nations people in the Top End and attending a football clinic in Darwin, Northern Territory. She has invited 50 Indigenous children and their carers to attend a World Cup game in Brisbane with her.

She has said that her "last battle, and one that she will continue to fight even after her retirement from FIFA, is to make sure that we will root racism out of football".

== Recognition ==
In 2018, Forbes ranked her Number 1 in their Most Powerful Women in International Sports list, and the BBC listed her as one of their 100 women.

When Samoura visited the AU Pavilion at the Expo 2020 in Dubai in 2021 with other FIFA Officials, the AU Expo Commissioner General, Levi Uche Madueke, said of Samoura, "She is a living testimony of the great human spirit that women across the African continent have, and her astute leadership should serve as a model worth replicating as we build towards the Africa we want, which involves the development of capable and credible leaders, especially amongst our women and youth".

== Personal life ==
Samoura is married and has three children.
