= Helmut Käser =

Swiss FIFA Secretary General (1912–1994)

Secretary General of FIFA
- In office April 1960 – June 1981
- Preceded by: Kurt Gassmann
- Succeeded by: Sepp Blatter

Personal details
- Born: 14 November 1912
- Died: 11 May 1994 (aged 81) Küsnacht, Switzerland
- Children: At least 2
- Occupation: Civil servant

Helmut Käser (14 November 1912 – 11 May 1994) served as the Secretary General of FIFA, the international governing body of association football, from April 1960 to June 1981. He served under three presidents of FIFA, Englishmen Arthur Drewry (1955–1961) and Stanley Rous (1961–1974), and under Brazilian João Havelange from 1974 to 1981.

Käser was succeeded by Sepp Blatter. Two months after Käser was forced to retire from FIFA, Blatter married Käser's daughter, Barbara. Käser did not attend the wedding.

Käser was an officer of the Swiss army; he worked as a civil servant in Switzerland at the Federal Department of Economic Affairs and became the general secretary of the Swiss Football Association in May 1942. He died in 1994 in Küsnacht near Zurich.
