= Mattias Grafström =

Swedish football administrator

Secretary General of FIFA
- Incumbent
- Assumed office 15 May 2024; 31 December 2023 – 15 May 2024 (acting)
- Preceded by: Fatma Samoura

Personal details
- Born: 24 September 1980 (age 45) Geneva, Switzerland

Mattias Grafström (born 24 September 1980) is a Swedish football administrator who has served as the Secretary General for FIFA since 15 May 2024. He was formerly the Deputy Secretary General in 2019, and was nominated to the Secretary General ad interim in October 2023, until his formal appointment by the FIFA Council.

== Biography ==
Mattias Grafström was born in Geneva on 24 September 1980 to a Swedish father and a Dutch mother. He grew up in Uppsala, and has been living in Switzerland for a long time.

In February 2016, following Gianni Infantino's election as FIFA President, he became the FIFA Chief of Staff.

In 2019, he was the Deputy Secretary General of FIFA under Fatma Samoura.

On 4 October 2023, following Samoura's resignation, Grafström was nominated as the interim Secretary General of FIFA, assuming office on 31 December. He formally took office on 15 May 2024.

== Personal life ==
Grafström is fluent in Swedish, Dutch, French, English, German and Spanish.
