= History of FIFA =

Aspect of football history

The history of FIFA traces back to the organization's founding on 21 May 1904. Since then, the international self-regulatory governing body has overseen association football, futsal and beach soccer. It is one of the world's oldest and largest NGOs. It has since expanded to include 211 member associations and is governed by a set of regulations.

== Beginnings ==
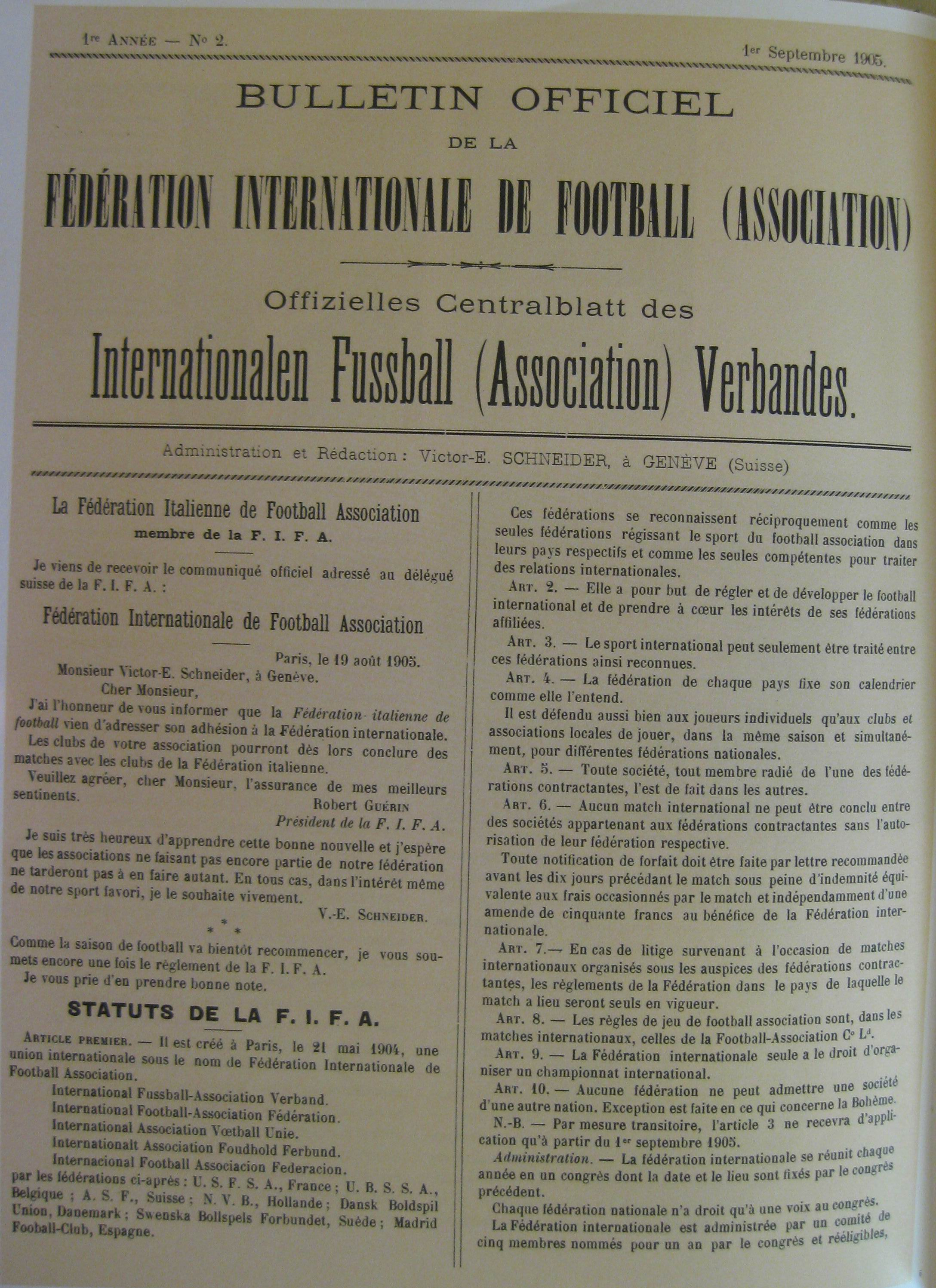
Charter FIFA (1 September 1905) original screen

The first official match between representatives of two nations was conducted between England and Scotland in 1872 at Hamilton Crescent, Partick, Glasgow, finishing in a 0–0 draw. The following year at The Oval, England enjoyed a 4–2 victory over the travelling Scots. This was followed by the creation of the world's second national football association, the Scottish Football Association in 1873. Previously the Football Association had been the world's only governing body, though codified football was being played only in the United Kingdom at this stage.

With the number of inter-nation matches increasing as football spread, the need for a global governing body emerged. Initially, it was intended to reflect the formative role of the British in football's history, but the football associations of the Home Nations unanimously rejected such a body. This was led by rejection from Football Association President Lord Kinnaird. Thus the nations of continental Europe decided to go it alone and 'FIFA' was born in Paris, uniting the football governing bodies of France, Belgium, Denmark, Netherlands, Spain, Sweden, and Switzerland on 21 May 1904. Germany also joined the federation on the same day by telegram but is not considered a founding member.

The initial statutes of FIFA stated that:

1. Only the represented National Associations would be recognised.
2. Clubs and players could only play for one National Association at a time.
3. All Associations would recognise the suspension of a player in any Association.
4. Matches were to be played according to the "Laws of the Game of the Football Association Ltd".
5. Each National Association was to pay an annual fee of 50 French Francs ($345.72 in 2025).
6. Only FIFA could organise International Matches.

These statutes came into effect on 1 September 1905, decided by the founding members and Germany. The first FIFA Congress was held on 23 May 1904 – Maurice Robert Guérin was elected president, Victor E. Schneider of Switzerland and Carl Anton Wilhelm Hirschmann of the Netherlands were made vice-presidents, and Louis Muhlinghaus of Belgium was appointed secretary and treasurer with the help of Ludvig Sylow of Denmark.

Early attempts at the organisation of a tournament began, but without the British countries, this failed. England, however, joined on 14 April 1905, thanks to great efforts by Baron Edouard de Laveleye who was made the first honorary member of FIFA. In 1906, Daniel Burley Woolfall took over as president, making strides to uniformity in the globe's laws.

FIFA continued to expand in federations and influence, being able to monopolise international matches. However, its organizational skills were still not refined, and it was the Football Association which organised the football tournaments at the 1908 and 1912 Olympic Games, both won by Great Britain.

Also during those years it briefly faced the appearance of a new rival international governing body, the UIAFA, which finally did not consolidate and disappeared, prevailing FIFA.

In 1909, South Africa (the first non-European member) joined, and Argentina and Chile followed in 1912. The United States and Canada entered just before World War I in 1913.

== Inter-war years ==
International football was rare during World War One and FIFA nearly collapsed after Woolfall's death in 1918; It was Hirschmann, almost acting alone, who kept FIFA alive, and in 1919 convened an assembly in Brussels. However, the British associations (representing England, Ireland, Scotland and Wales) withdrew in protest against the inclusion of countries from the Central Powers. They re-joined in the early '20s, but withdrew again in 1928 following a disagreement with FIFA regarding payments to amateur players, and did not return until after World War II. In 1920, Jules Rimet of France was elected chairman, becoming president in 1921.

FIFA began to organise Olympic games football tournaments, with 60,000 spectators watching the final at the 1924 Summer Olympics between Uruguay and Switzerland.

These successes prompted FIFA, at the Amsterdam congress of 28 May 1928, to consider staging its own World Championship. At the following Congress in Barcelona plans were finalised – it would be held in Uruguay, which was celebrating its 100th anniversary of independence the following year. Unfortunately, Europe was in the midst of an economic crisis, and teams would have to do without their key players for two months – several nations pulled out. Without them, the first World Cup opened in Montevideo on 18 July 1930 – with only four European teams.

Following the disappointment of not hosting the first tournament, Italy was chosen as the venue for the 1934 World Cup. Following the previous tournament, all matches were played in one country, meaning some teams made the long trip home after just one qualifying round. The final, won by the Italians, was the first to be broadcast live on radio. Italy defended this title in the last World Cup before World War II, in France.

== Post-war expansion ==
In 1946 the four British nations returned. On 10 May 1947 a "Match of the Century" between Great Britain and "Rest of Europe XI" was played at Hampden Park in Glasgow before 135,000 spectators – Britain won 6–1. The proceeds from the match, coming to £35 000, were given to FIFA, to help re-launch it after World War II. This was followed by FIFA's first post-war World Cup in 1950, held in Brazil, and won by Uruguay. FIFA, meanwhile, continued to expand so that by the time of its fiftieth anniversary it had 84 members.

== 1950s and 1960s ==
In 1954, Jules Rimet was replaced by Rodolphe William Seeldrayers of Belgium; Seeldrayers died the next year and was succeeded by Englishman, Arthur Drewry. He again had a short presidency and was replaced upon his death in 1961 by Sir Stanley Rous, a former referee. During Rous' presidency, the game continued to spread, with the World Cup appearing on television for the first time. Rous was a traditionalist, promoting the amateurism of the national game and a romantic view of "Corinthian" values. He helped make the World Cup one of the big international sports events, behind perhaps only the Olympic Games in worldwide prestige. His tenure was also marked with controversy, as he supported the South African apartheid regime, and worked to allow the country to participate in the World Cup, despite having been banned from CAF. This caused tensions between Rous and a number of FIFA confederations.

== Havelange's presidency ==
Rous was replaced in 1974 by the Brazilian João Havelange. FIFA became a more commercial institution at this time. He increased the number of teams in the World Cup to 24 for the 1982 World Cup and then to 32 at the 1998 World Cup. He also brought Israel into the international game (affiliated to UEFA) and saw FIFA spread across the globe, with small nations such as Guam, Lesotho and Montserrat joining.

== The new millennium ==
The next president, Sepp Blatter, maintained this policy; he promised the 2010 World Cup to Africa, for example. He oversaw a federation that was a massive corporate body and whose actions have a global economic and political impact.

In 2006, after the game between Switzerland and South Korea, South Korean access to the FIFA website has been blocked. The rumour spread in Korea that if they send 500 million protest notes to the FIFA administration Switzerland's victory might be cancelled. Because of this, overwhelming access from Korean users (which was detected by IP address) caused problems and FIFA eventually denied Korean access.

=== FIFA altitude ban ===
FIFA attempted to address the issue of extreme altitude in May 2007, ruling that no future international matches could be played at an altitude over 2500 m (8200 ft).

The FIFA altitude ban would most notably have affected the national teams of Andean countries. Under this proposal, Bolivia would no longer be able to play international matches in La Paz (3600 m), Ecuador would be unable to play in Quito (2800 m), and Colombia could no longer play in Bogotá (2640 m).

However, FIFA soon backed away from the proposal after international condemnation, and under political pressure from the CONMEBOL countries, first extending the maximum altitude to 2800 m (9190 ft) in June 2007, which made Bogotá and Quito viable international venues once again, and then waiving the restriction for La Paz in July 2007.

=== Controversy over the 2022 World Cup selection and allegations of corruption ===
In May 2011, after Qatar was selected to host the 2022 World Cup, allegations of bribery on the part of two members of the FIFA Executive Committee were tabled by Lord Triesman of the English FA. These allegations were based on information from a whistleblower involved with the Qatari bid. FIFA has since opened an internal inquiry into the matter, and a revote on the 2022 World Cup remains a possibility if the allegations are proven. FIFA president Sepp Blatter has admitted that there is a groundswell of popular support to re-hold the 2022 vote won by Qatar.

In testimony to a UK parliamentary inquiry board in May 2011, David Triesman, Baron Triesman alleged that Trinidad and Tobago's Jack Warner demanded $4 million for an education centre in his country and Paraguay's Nicolás Léoz asked for an honorary knighthood in exchange for their votes. Also, two Sunday Times reporters testified that they had been told that Jacques Anouma of the Ivory Coast and Issa Hayatou of Cameroon were each paid $1.5 million to support Qatar's bid for the tournament. All four have denied the allegations. Mohammed bin Hammam, who played a key role in securing the games for Qatar, withdrew as a candidate for president of FIFA in May 2011 after being accused of bribing 25 FIFA officials to vote for his candidacy. Soon after, FIFA suspended bin Hammam and Jack Warner as the ethics investigation continued. After his suspension, Warner stated that FIFA had awarded him 1998 World Cup rights in Trinidad and Tobago after he had helped Blatter win his campaign to become FIFA president and given preferential treatment for future World Cup rights after supporting Blatter's 2002 reelection.

The corruption allegations against Bin Hammam and Jack Warner were levelled by CONCACAF general secretary Chuck Blazer. In response, CONCACAF president Lisle Austin attempted to fire Blazer, but the move was blocked by the CONCACAF executive committee.

=== 2016 British poppy controversy ===
In 2011, FIFA made an exception for the British Home Nations to wear a black armband with a remembrance poppy emblem on it. In 2016, the Home Nations games clashed again with the United Kingdom's Remembrance Day period, however, this time FIFA told them that they were not allowed to wear the poppy armbands. All four Home Nations announced that they would wear the poppy armbands regardless and face the penalty. Although all four Home Nations had originally agreed to ignore the ban, Wales and Northern Ireland were misled to believe that there would only be a punishment if the opposition team complained about the armband. As England played Scotland both teams agreed not to complain and therefore avoid a penalty. Wales and Northern Ireland on the other hand, who both faced teams from away, would receive a penalty. The Welsh and Northern Irish teams decided at the last minute to not wear the poppy arms bands and instead come up with other inventive ways to introduce the poppy at the games, including wreaths of poppies and fans holding up placards with poppy images on them.

On 14 November 2016, FIFA announced that England and Scotland, which had played each other and worn the poppy armbands, would both face penalties, even though no one had made a complaint. On 23 November, the same was announced about Wales and Northern Ireland, despite their teams not wearing the armbands and despite, once again, the absence of complaints. The list of charges brought against the Welsh team controversially included "fans in the stadium wearing a Remembrance poppy on their shirts".

On 10 January 2017, the FIFA Council unanimously approved tournament expansion, with the 48-team format introduced at the 2026 FIFA World Cup.

== Some FIFA logos through history ==
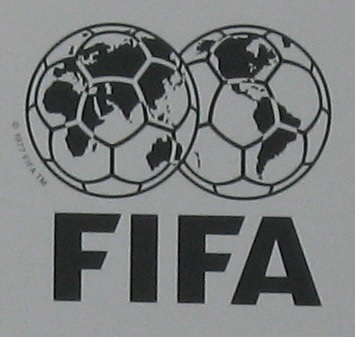
1998–2009 (monochrome version)

Since 2009

== List of presidents of FIFA ==
FIFA has been served by eight Presidents since its foundation in 1904:

No.	President	Nationality	Presidency
1	Robert Guérin	France	1904–1906
2	Daniel Burley Woolfall	England	1906–1918
–	Cornelis Hirschman (acting)	Netherlands	1918–1921
3	Jules Rimet	France	1921–1954
4	Rodolphe Seeldrayers	Belgium	1954–1955
5	Arthur Drewry	England	1955–1961
6	Sir Stanley Rous	England	1961–1974
7	Dr João Havelange	Brazil	1974–1998
8	Sepp Blatter	Switzerland	1998–2015
–	Issa Hayatou (acting)	Cameroon	2015–2016
9	Gianni Infantino	Switzerland / Italy / Lebanon	2016–present

== List of secretaries general of FIFA ==
FIFA has been served by nine secretaries general since its foundation in 1904:

Secretary general	Nationality	Term
Louis Muhlinghaus	Belgium	1904–1906
Cornelis August Wilhelm Hirschman	Netherlands	1906–1931
Ivo Schricker	Germany / West Germany	1932–1951
Kurt Gassmann	Switzerland	1951–1960
Helmut Käser	Switzerland	1961–1981
Sepp Blatter	Switzerland	1981–1998
Michel Zen-Ruffinen	Switzerland	1998–2002
Urs Linsi	Switzerland	2002–2007
Jérôme Valcke	France	2007–2015
Markus Kattner (acting)	Germany	2015–2016
Fatma Samoura	Senegal	2016–2023
Mattias Grafström	Sweden	2024–present

== See also ==
- FIFA World Cup
