= Kurt Gassmann =

Swiss football administrator (1891–1964)

Secretary General of FIFA
- In office 1951 – 1960
- Preceded by: Ivo Schricker
- Succeeded by: Helmut Käser

Personal details
- Born: 21 May 1891 Bern, Switzerland
- Died: 24 July 1964 (aged 73)

Kurt Gassmann (21 May 1891 – 24 July 1964) was a Swiss jurist and sports official who served as Secretary General of FIFA (1951–1960).

== Biography ==
Gassmann, born in 1891 in Bern, started his career in sports as a football player for FC Biel, and later became the General Secretary of the Swiss Football Association (SFA) in 1916, a role he held for about 16 years until 1942. During his tenure, he was instrumental in organizing various football events and was later honored as an honorary member of the SFA in 1945.

Gassmann's involvement with the Swiss Olympic Committee (COS) began in 1923. He played a crucial role in organizing the 1948 Winter Olympics in St. Moritz, the first Winter Games after World War II. Despite the challenges of organizing the event in post-war Europe, his meticulous planning and organizational skills ensured its success, earning praise from the International Olympic Committee for being one of the best-organized games.

In addition to his work with the Olympics, Gassmann also served as the General Secretary of FIFA from 1951 to 1960. During his tenure, he oversaw the organization of the 1954 FIFA World Cup in Switzerland. His administrative skills and detailed approach significantly shaped the operations of FIFA during a formative period for the organization. However, he opposed UEFA's proposal to hold a European competition in the same year as the World Cup, fearing it would compete with FIFA's tournament and affect its revenue. He suggested scheduling the European competition's knockout phase two years before and the final tournament one year before the World Cup, and recommended separating its stages from those of the World Cup.
