= Markus Kattner =

German Swiss football executive

Secretary-General of FIFA (acting)
- In office 17 September 2015 – 23 May 2016
- Preceded by: Jérôme Valcke
- Succeeded by: Fatma Samoura

Personal details
- Born: 24 September 1970 (age 55) Bayreuth, West Germany
- Occupation: Business consultant Football administrator

Markus Kattner (born 24 September 1970) is a German-Swiss business consultant and former association football executive. He served as acting Secretary-General of FIFA from September 2015 to May 2016, but was dismissed without notice after being accused of paying himself bonuses worth millions of US dollars during a previous stint as FIFA's director of finance. Kattner has begun legal proceedings against FIFA before the competent court in Zurich as he believes his dismissal to be unjustified. The Zurich High Court ruled in Kattner's favour and decided in its ruling of 4 October 2022 that his dismissal without notice was unjustified. In his complaint, Kattner claimed that "the reasons for his dismissal were pretextual and inaccurate".

== Biography ==
Markus Kattner was born in Bayreuth, West Germany, and grew up in Munich; for four years he played basketball in the second division of the Basketball Bundesliga. He graduated with a bachelor's degree in engineering from the Technical University of Munich (TUM) and completed a doctorate degree at the Swiss Federal Institute of Technology in Lausanne (EPFL, 1999).

Before joining FIFA, Kattner worked as a consultant for McKinsey & Company in Switzerland alongside Philippe Blatter, a nephew of FIFA's president Joseph Blatter, and the pair worked together while advising the Federation. In 2003, he joined FIFA as director of finance and in September 2015, when Jerome Valcke was sacked for financial irregularities, Kattner took over as acting secretary-general. Kattner himself was sacked in May 2016, after being accused of paying himself bonuses worth millions of US dollars over a six-year period (2008–2014). Kattner has begun legal proceedings against FIFA before the competent court in Zurich as he believes his dismissal to be unfair, maintaining that the compensation payments were perfectly legitimate and did not break a single FIFA statute. In June 2020, he received a 10-year ban from football and was fined the amount of CHF 1,000,000 after an investigation into bonus payments.

== Personal life ==
Kattner has German-Swiss dual nationality and is married with three daughters. He is a Bayern Munich supporter and also likes running, skiing and playing the piano.
