= Economics of the FIFA World Cup =

The FIFA World Cup occurs every four years since 1930 and a different host country is chosen each time. It is one of the largest sporting events of this century and billions of people watch it around the world. Host countries hope that the World Cup will increase tourism, employment, and international stature. Research also suggests a home advantage for the host country's team. However, analysis shows mixed results when it comes to economic outcomes. The FIFA World Cup is said to have a significant impact on the host country's economy. Even though the cost of hosting the competition is significant, the money brought in from tourism and the jobs created are major plusses. Since 1970, the revenue gained by hosting a FIFA World Cup has been similar to the Olympics. For example, when Qatar hosted the FIFA World Cup in 2022, it made an estimated profit of $17 billion.

== Italy (1990) ==
Italy had been hit by a global economic crisis in the late 1970s which continued to affect the country's economy through the 1980s. There were hopes that the FIFA World Cup of 1990 would strengthen the country's economy and international reputation. Italy invested 362.87 million USD into building a stadium in Turin, as well as more money to renovate other stadiums for the mega-event. Italy was the first example of a country overspending on a World Cup. The country had budgeted 2 billion USD but spent about 3.69 billion USD, which led to further indebtedness for the country. The Italy 1990 World Cup is also the first example of the event becoming truly commercialized. The game had an official soundtrack, video games, and associated product lines. It was the first World Cup to be considered a "mega-sporting event." Analysis shows that the World Cup was correlated with increased property crime (such as bag-snatching, pick-pocketing, and shoplifting) in hosting provinces.

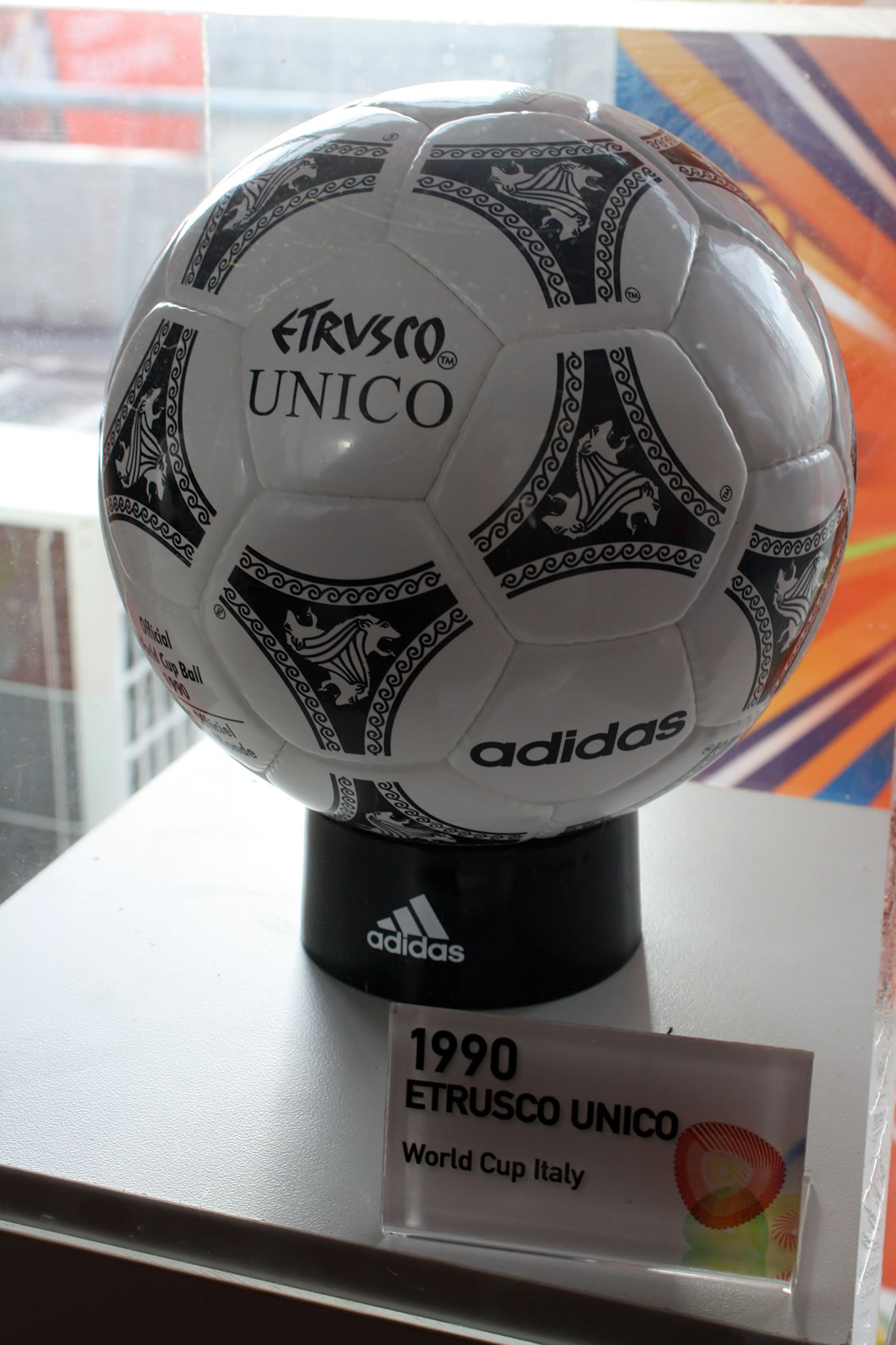
Official match ball for the FIFA World Cup 1990 in Italy

== United States (1994) ==
In the United States was, as usual, hosted in a number of cities. In Los Angeles, site of the final, there was a total economic profit of $623 million that went directly into the metropolitan economy. In comparison, in the same year the Super Bowl only accounted for $182 million (Nodell). These figures were calculated over just the one-month period in which these games took place. In California alone, reports from the Pasadena Convention and Visitors Bureau conclude that 1,700 part-time jobs became available during the preparation and duration of the event (Deady). New York City, San Francisco, and Boston received combined revenue of $1.045 billion. The overall increases from the previous year on hotels and on food and beverages were 10% and 15%. This money spent on hotels and restaurants helped the entire U.S. economy.

In addition to the direct impacts of the 1994 World Cup, there were also indirect impacts: in order to host the Cup the United States had to develop a national soccer league, resulting in the formation of Major League Soccer (MLS) in 1996. Construction of new facilities, sponsorship of new teams, and the revenue of the ticket sales all resulted in economic boosts. The newly introduced professional league engendered one of the fastest growing youth sports in the country. Youth soccer took off and the selling of apparel and gear for the sport was an opportunity for private businesses.

== France (1998) ==
France experienced a 13.4% decrease in overnight hotel stays by non-residents during the 1998 World Cup, compared to June the year before. There was no significant impact observed on retail sales in France during the World Cup. The "couch potato effect" argues that local residents may have felt the desire to stay home and watch the games on television to avoid crowds. This could partially explain the limited retail sales. France kept its spending comparatively low on the World Cup (less than 500 million USD) by mostly renovating existing stadiums and only building one new one, the Stade de France. A significant positive impact on employment in hosting regions was observed starting in 1996, due to the start of construction on facilities for the World Cup.

Large portions of the profits from the World Cup did not go to France, but instead went to multinational organizations such as ISL, Sony, and FIFA itself. In the past, much of the tournament's revenue had come from physical ticket sales, but by 1998 most of it was coming from television. The French stadiums were small compared to previous ones, so less physical tickets could be sold. The going-rate for European television rights to cover the World Cup was 1.12 billion Euros. Global coverage of the event led to massive incentives for corporate sponsors. Income from corporate sponsors was over 240 million Euros. FIFA predicted the total revenue from the 1998 World Cup to be 20 billion Euros. French organizers had very limited control over television rights, which had been sold before they were made the host. Due to a sponsorship deal with Coca Cola, hotels hosting FIFA members could not sell Pepsi products.

== South Korea / Japan (2002) ==
In the 2002 World Cup, several other advantages were discovered when the competition was split between Japan and Korea. This was the first time the tournament had been hosted in two countries, with 32 matches played in each country and a total of 64 matches. With the three million live spectators ticket sales were 1.2 billion dollars. FIFA promised each country $110 million for hosting and all revenue from their ticket sales. Each country expanded their 20 soccer facilities, with a total investment of $4.7 billion. A host country can also see value in the national exposure, with so many people viewing and attending the event.

It was predicted prior to the 2002 Cup that the England team's absence would cost the economy $4.7 billion in lost output, or about 0.3% of their GDP (Gross Domestic Product) were they to win the entire tournament. Should the England team lose in just the first two weeks however, the losses were only expected to reach a total of 1.8 billion.

== Germany (2006) ==
The 2006 World Cup was judged a success comparable to that of the 1994 US World Cup. The German government reported that tourism revenue over the month of the World Cup was up roughly 400 million dollars. They made about 3 billion more dollars in retail such as jerseys and other paraphernalia regarding the Cup. Lastly, a reported 500,000 new jobs were yielded in preparation for the tournament. This impact sends ripples through an economy. Restaurants and bars were full to capacity at all hours of the tournament, and 15 million more spectators arrived in Germany than was expected.

This success drew attention to the German professional league, the Bundesliga. As a result, sales of tickets and team paraphernalia have increased dramatically. Many global corporations witnessed the craze in Germany during the World Cup and in recognizing the country's passion for the sport they have begun to sponsor many more German teams than prior to 2006. The global viewing of Bundesliga games has increased as well, helping these sponsors and German telecasters the profits they were expecting.

The 2006 World Cup had an operating budget (for staging the event, not inclusive of capital infrastructure costs) of €425 million. The German Football Association announced a profit before tax of €135 million. After tax and repaying the FIFA contribution of €40.8 million - the net profit was €56.6 million which was distributed to the German Football Association and the German Football League.

For Germany 2006 that the host country was entitled to the gross receipts of all ticket sales. In October 2007 FIFA announced : reassumed responsibility for ticket sales and will establish a company named '2010 FIFA World Cup Ticketing Ltd' to this end.".

== South Africa (2010) ==
The 2010 FIFA World Cup was held in South Africa, for the first time in the tournament's history. Even though it may not have attracted as many foreign visitors as the US and Germany World Cups, it did have an economic benefit due to the location and already emerging economy.

Any predictions about the economic impact of the 2010 FIFA World Cup on South Africa had to take into account the state of the South African economy, which still has one of the largest disparities between the rich and the poor. One main factor for South Africa is attracting international investors. To increase the international trade and foreign direct investment, South Africa must have stability throughout their whole region in their economy and government. If this is achieved then South Africa could be in the top choices for foreign direct investment and collect the potential benefits of the 2010 FIFA games. Because FIFA gathers all of its finances through marketing tournaments such as the World Cup, they aim to ensure the event's success, and assist the hosting country accordingly. Since South Africa is still a developing country, FIFA will have an important role in funding the tournament. Along with other developing countries that host mega-events, the investment of larger capital investment is required.

The projected total direct economic value for GDP is approximately R 21.3 billion. Also, 159,000 new jobs are predicted, including full- and part- time jobs, both permanent and temporary. The government also plans to spend millions on upgrading stadiums and building a new international airport. The tournament will host 32 teams with an average of 50 people per team, 14,500 VIPs and dignitaries, 500 officials and 10,500 media. A projected number of half a million foreign visitors (located outside of Africa) are expected and staying an average of 15 days.

== Brazil (2014) ==
In 2014, the FIFA World Cup was hosted in Brazil. This decision was based on location and close evaluation through various economical models. After years of unnecessary construction, eminent domain and countless protests, Brazil was found to be in a worse state than before. Costs of the tournament totalled $11.6 billion, making it the most expensive World Cup to date, until surpassed by 2018 FIFA World Cup which cost an estimated $14.2 billion. FIFA was expected to spend US$2 billion on staging the finals, with its greatest single expense being the US$576 million prize money pot.

== Russia (2018) ==
Russia's official budget of 678 billion rubles spent on projects for the tournament is less than the $15bn spent by Brazil on the 2014 World Cup. FIFA has budgeted spending $791m on teams and players - including prize money, compensation, insurance for players injured on national-team duty, and the preparation costs for the 32 featured teams.

== 2018/2022 World Cup winning bids ==
On 2 December 2010, Russia and Qatar were awarded the 2018 and 2022 World Cups, respectively.

The United States was a bidder for the 2018 and 2022 World Cups, although questions were being raised about the US bid and whether its economic impact on the US would in fact be as favorable as promised. A new report argues that the US World Cup in 1994 lost billions of dollars despite a positive economic impact estimate, noted that the same company is creating the estimate for the current bid, and predicts that a 2022 US World Cup could again lose billions of dollars in lost in revenue.

== Statistics ==
Costs of World Cups

Edition	Host(s)	General cost (US billions)
2022	Qatar	$200
2018	Russia	$16
2014	Brazil	$19.7
2010	South Africa	$7.2
2006	Germany	$5.2
2002	Japan; South Korea	$7
1998	France	$2.85
1994	United States	$0.5
1990	Italy	$4
1982	Spain	$0.44
1978	Argentina	$2.7
1974	Germany	$0.65
1970	Mexico	$0.07
