= Jérôme Valcke =

French football administrator (born 1960)

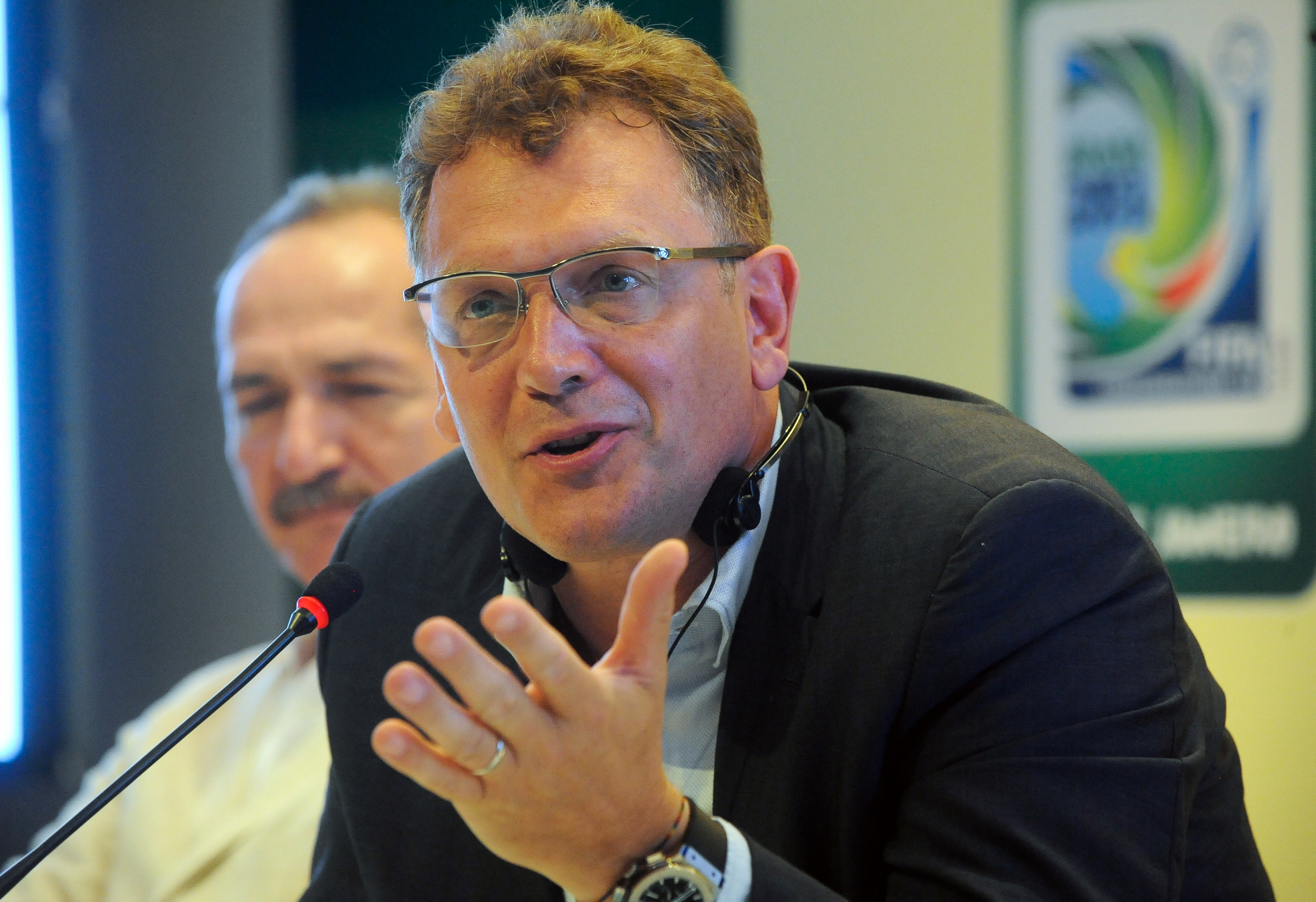
- Valcke in 2013

Secretary General of FIFA
- In office 27 June 2007 – 18 September 2015
- Preceded by: Urs Linsi
- Succeeded by: Markus Kattner (acting)

Personal details
- Born: 6 October 1960 (age 65) Paris, France
- Spouse: Ornella Stocchi
- Children: 3

Jérôme Valcke (born 6 October 1960) is a French football administrator, best known as the former Secretary General of FIFA (the international governing body of the sport). He was fired on 13 January 2016 as a result of allegations arising from the ongoing 2015 FIFA corruption case.

Originally a journalist with a French TV station Canal+, in 1997 he was appointed chief executive officer at Sport+. In 2003, he moved to FIFA as their Director of Marketing & TV, under the presidency of Sepp Blatter. He was released on 12 December 2006 due to his role in negotiating FIFA sponsorship contracts with rival credit card companies Visa and MasterCard. In 2007, he returned to FIFA, being appointed Secretary General by Blatter, succeeding Urs Linsi. He was relieved of his duties on 17 September 2015, and then provisionally banned from all football on 8 October 2015 for a period of 90 days, extended on expiry for another 45 days, before finally being dismissed. On 12 January 2016, Valcke was banned by the FIFA Ethics Committee until 2028 and fined 100,000 Swiss francs. On 28 February 2017, Valcke appealed against the ban to the Court of Arbitration for Sport (CAS). This appeal was subsequently dismissed by the CAS on 27 July 2018 and the FIFA Ethics Committee's original ruling was upheld.

== Career ==
Valcke was employed as a journalist at the French TV company Canal+. From 1991 until 1997 he held the office of deputy chief of sport. In 1997, he took over the position of chief executive officer at Sport+.

=== FIFA Director of Marketing ===
In the summer of 2003, Valcke switched to the international football federation FIFA in Zürich and took the position of Director of Marketing & TV.

==== Visa negotiation controversy ====
A New York court found on 7 December 2006 that Valcke had lied in his role as marketing director for negotiating sponsor agreements with the rival VISA, despite the existing agreement of FIFA conducted with the long-time partner MasterCard and thus violated the right of first negotiation of MasterCard. Because of this, FIFA was fined US$60 million. Despite the ruling, Valcke protested his innocence, stating "I feel I am clean . . . I don't have the feeling that we have been so dirty."

FIFA president Sepp Blatter released Valcke, along with three other FIFA employees, on 12 December 2006 from his job as marketing director. FIFA released a statement regarding these four employees: "Fifa's negotiations breached its business principles . . . Fifa cannot possibly accept such conduct among its own employees." According to Blatter, Valcke was released and had not been fired. Valcke was replaced by Eelco M. van der Noll as interim Director, Marketing at FIFA.

After an appeal and further legal proceedings, FIFA reached a settlement with Visa and MasterCard on 21 June for US$90 million.

=== FIFA General Secretary ===
Despite the scandal, Valcke was installed as FIFA's general secretary at the meeting of FIFA's Executive Committee on 27 June 2007, as proposed by FIFA President Sepp Blatter, and was thereby elected as the successor of Urs Linsi who stepped down on 11 June 2007. Markus Kattner, FIFA's chief of finance who had acted as interim general secretary between 11 and 27 June 2007, was installed as his deputy. Valcke is the first general secretary of FIFA since 1956 who wasn't born in Switzerland.

The appointment of Valcke as FIFA's general secretary surprised some experts. FIFA president Blatter said: "Strong people bring you back. When he began his work as director of marketing and TV in FIFA four and a half years ago, we were in a financial crisis. Currently we have an equity of CHF 752 million." Valcke responded to his promotion of 27 June 2007 in Zurich, with the following statement: "It's like a dream for me."

==== Corruption allegations ====
===== 2011 accusations =====
On 30 May 2011, FIFA Executive Committee member Jack Warner, who had been suspended that day for possible ethics violations pending an investigation, leaked an email from Valcke which suggested that Qatar had "bought" the rights to host the 2022 FIFA World Cup. Valcke subsequently issued a statement denying any suggestions that pay off took place, and claimed that "the country had used its financial muscle to lobby for support" instead. Qatar officials similarly denied all media-perpetuated mischief allegations.

===== 2015 accusations =====
On 27 May 2015, the United States Department of Justice unsealed an indictment following the arrest of several past and present FIFA officials. It stated that "a high-ranking FIFA official" caused payments totalling US$10 million to be paid to bank accounts in the name of CONCACAF and Caribbean Football Union controlled by Warner.

FIFA denied that Valcke was involved, and Valcke stated that he had not authorised the payment and had no power to do so. However, it later transpired that South African Football Association President Dr. Molefi Olphant had written to Valcke on 4 March 2008 requesting that US$10 million be diverted from the 2010 FIFA World Cup Organising Committee's future budget towards a "Diaspora Legacy Programme Fund" operated by then CONCACAF President Jack Warner. The U.S. indictment stated "Co-Conspirator #1 understood the offer to be in exchange for the agreement of WARNER, Co-Conspirator #1, and Co-Conspirator #17 to all vote for South Africa, rather than Morocco, to host the 2010 World Cup."

===== Suspension, investigation and termination =====
On 17 September 2015, FIFA stated that Valcke had been put on leave and released from his duties until further notice. The decision was made by the FIFA Emergency Committee after a series of allegations implicated Valcke of selling World Cup tickets for above face value. On 8 October 2015, the investigatory arm of the FIFA Ethics Committee suspended him from all football for 90 days. On the expiry of that ban, it was extended for another 45 days and his case was passed to the Ethics Committee's adjudicatory arm for formal proceedings against him for alleged "misuse of expenses and other infringements of FIFA's rules and regulations", with the recommendation from the investigation arm that he be banned from all football for nine years, and fined 100,000 Swiss francs. On 13 January 2016, he was dismissed as Secretary General and his employment at FIFA was terminated with immediate effect. In July 2018, he lost his appeal to CAS against his 10-year ban from football.

===== 2020 prosecution =====
On 14 September 2020, the Swiss Federal Court started to prosecute both Valcke and Nasser Al-Khelaifi, based on charges related to a meeting on 24 October 2013, at the French headquarters of beIN, in which Al-Khelaifi allegedly promised to purchase a villa in Porto Cervo, Sardinia for €5m, to be utilized by Valcke through a rental contract signed by Abdelkader Bessedik, in exchange to granting the 2026 and 2030 World Cups screening rights to beIN Media.

In the meantime, Valcke was also accused of accepting $1.5 million in bribes from Greek businessman Dinos Deris, to help him in paying his $11m personal debt, stemmed from the purchase of two homes in Switzerland worth CHF 7m as well as a 34 metres (112 ft) boat valued at more than CHF 2m.

===== Suspension extended =====
On 24 March 2021, his first suspension which was due to expire in October 2025, was extended by six years until 2031.

== Personal life ==
Besides his first language, French, Valcke speaks English, German and Spanish. He is married to Ornella Stocchi, because of whom he obtained South African citizenship, and has one son and one daughter, Matteo and Valentina.
