= Human rights issues involving the 2022 FIFA World Cup =

There have been several criticisms and controversies of perceived human rights violations related to the organisation and hosting of the 2022 FIFA World Cup in Qatar. There have long been concerns for the state of human rights in Qatar, with the state accused of sportswashing in hosting the World Cup.

A large concern in Qatar's hosting of the World Cup was the conditions of migrant workers brought in to build the required infrastructure, including indentured servitude and extreme working conditions leading to numerous deaths under the Kafala system. The state of women's rights in Qatar and a British tourism executive hired to promote the country dying under suspicious circumstances have also been sources of controversy.

In a December 2021 interview with Al Jazeera, FIFA's secretary-general Fatma Samoura said that FIFA had developed a general framework to structure and guide the implementation of its human rights responsibilities and commitment, published in 2017, and that Qatar had implemented those recommendations.

== Migrant workers ==
=== Indentured servitude ===
==== Kafala system ====
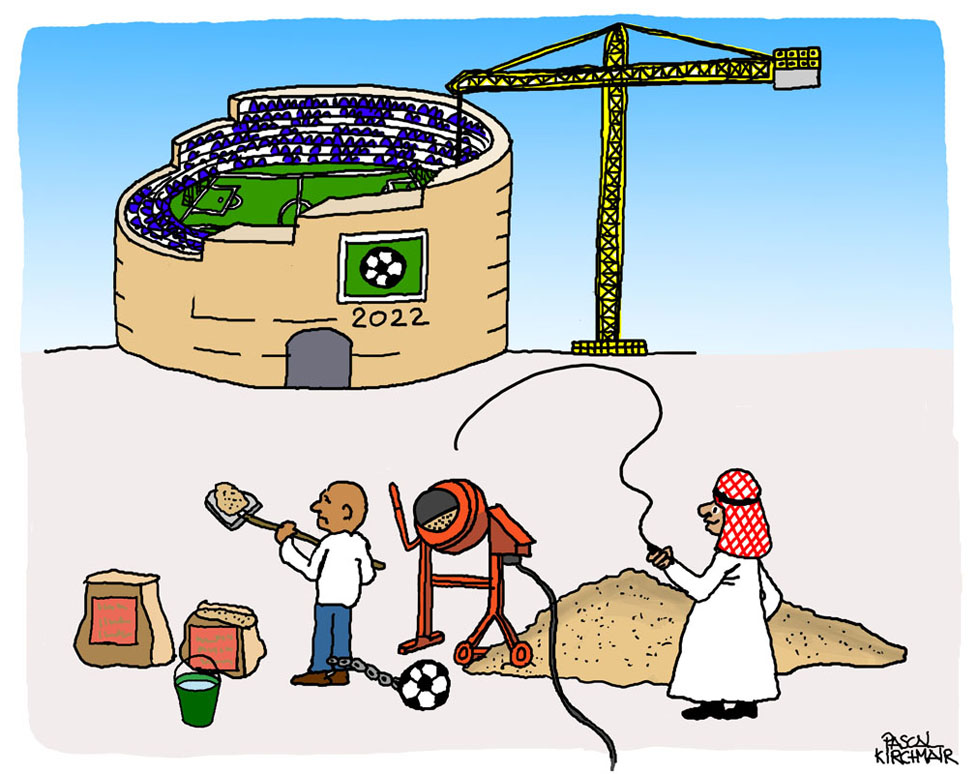
A political cartoon depicting slave labour in the construction of the stadiums in Qatar ahead of the 2022 FIFA World Cup (see also: Slavery in Qatar)

One of the most discussed issues of the Qatar World Cup was the treatment of workers hired to build the infrastructure. Most Qatari nationals avoid doing manual work or low-skilled jobs. They are given preference in the workplace. In May 2014, Qatar announced plans to abolish the kafala system, but implementation was delayed until 2016, and even if the promised reforms are implemented, employers would still have considerable power over workers (for example, a proposed requirement that wages must be paid into a designated bank account would not cover labourers paid in cash).

Human Rights Watch and the International Trade Union Confederation (ITUC) state that the kafala system leaves migrants vulnerable to systematic abuse. Workers could not change jobs or even leave the country without their sponsor's permission. In November 2013, Amnesty International reported "serious exploitation", including workers having to sign false statements that they had received their wages in order to regain their passports from their sponsors' custody. An investigation by The Guardian in the same year claimed that workers had their identity papers taken away from them, were compelled to perform forced labor, and that they were not paid on time or at all, making some of them effectively slaves. The Guardian also reported that companies refused to pay salaries and administer necessary worker ID permits, rendering the workers illegal aliens and forcing them to stay. The report stated that there was evidence to suggest that workers face exploitation and abuse as defined by the International Labour Organization (ILO).

By 2015, Michael van Praag, president of the Royal Dutch Football Association, requested the FIFA Executive Committee to pressure Qatar over the allegations to ensure better workers' conditions. He also stated that a new vote on the attribution of the World Cup to Qatar would have to take place if the corruption allegations were to be proved. In March 2016, Amnesty International accused Qatar of using forced labour, forcing the employees to live in poor conditions, and withholding their wages and passports. It also accused FIFA of failing to act against the human rights abuses. Migrant workers told Amnesty about verbal abuse and threats they received after complaining about not being paid for up to several months. Nepali workers were denied leave to visit their family after the 2015 Nepal earthquake.

In August 2022, Qatari authorities arrested and deported over 60 migrant workers who protested about non-payment of wages by their employer, Al Bandary International Group, a major construction and hospitality firm. Some of the demonstrators, from Nepal, Bangladesh, India, Egypt and the Philippines, had not been paid for seven months. London-based labour rights body Equidem said most were sent home. Qatar's labour ministry said it was paying Al Bandary workers and taking further action against the company - already under investigation for failing to pay wages.

In September 2022, Amnesty published the results of a poll of over 17,000 football fans from 15 countries which showed 73% supported FIFA compensating migrant workers in Qatar for human rights violations. FIFA responded with a statement noting progress on Qatar's migrant worker policies, adding "FIFA will continue its efforts to enable remediation for workers who may have been adversely impacted in relation to FIFA World Cup-related work in accordance with its Human Rights Policy and responsibilities under relevant international standards."

On 24 November 2022, during the tournament, the European Parliament adopted a resolution requesting FIFA to help compensate the families of migrant workers who died in Qatar, and for Qatar to conduct a full human rights investigation. Before the tournament was over, several individuals involved in the European Parliament had been arrested on charges of colluding in organised crime with Qatar, including aiming to improve Qatar's human rights reputation ahead of the World Cup.

==== Labour reforms ====
In October 2017, the ITUC said that Qatar had signed an agreement to improve the situation of more than two million migrant workers in the country. According to the ITUC, the agreement provided for substantial reforms in the labour system, including ending the kafala system, and would positively affect the general situation of workers, especially those working on 2022 FIFA World Cup infrastructure projects. The workers would no longer need their employer's permission to leave the country or change their jobs. Amnesty International have questioned whether Qatar would complete the promised labour reforms before the start of the World Cup, a sentiment that FIFA backed. Amnesty International found that abuses were still occurring despite the nation taking some steps to improve labour rights. Law No. 13 of 2018 abolished exit visas for about 95 percent of migrant workers. On 30 April 2018, the ILO opened its first project office in Qatar to monitor and support the implementation of the new labour laws. In February 2019, Amnesty International said Qatar was falling short on promised labour reforms before the start of the World Cup, a sentiment that FIFA backed. Amnesty also found that abuses were still occurring. In May 2019, an investigation by the UK's Daily Mirror newspaper discovered that some of the 28,000 workers on the stadiums were being paid 750 Qatari riyals per month, equivalent to £190 per month or 99 pence an hour for a typical 48-hour week. In October 2019, the ILO said that Qatar had taken steps towards upholding the rights of migrant workers.

In April 2020, the government of Qatar provided $824 million to pay the wages of migrant workers in quarantine or undergoing treatment for COVID-19. In August 2020, the Qatari government announced a monthly minimum wage for all workers of 1,000 riyals (US$275), an increase from the previous temporary minimum wage of 750 riyals a month. The new laws went into effect in March 2021. The ILO said "Qatar is the first country in the region to introduce a non-discriminatory minimum wage, which is a part of a series of historical reforms of the country's labour laws," but the campaign group Migrant Rights said the new minimum wage was too low to meet migrant workers' need with Qatar's high cost of living. In addition, employers are obligated to pay 300 riyals for food and 500 riyals for accommodation, if they do not provide employees with these directly. The No Objection Certificate was removed so that employees can change jobs without consent of the current employer. A Minimum Wage Committee was also formed to check on the implementation. These reforms removed the kafala system and a contractual system was introduced – the European Union's Annual Report on Human Rights and Democracy in the World 2021 noted Qatar's labour law reforms had incorporated non-discriminatory minimum wage systems and removal of the Kafala system in 2021.

At the March 2022 FIFA Congress in Doha, Lise Klaveness—head of the Norwegian Football Federation—criticised the organisation for having awarded the World Cup to Qatar, citing the various controversies surrounding the tournament. She argued that "in 2010 World Cups were awarded by FIFA in unacceptable ways with unacceptable consequences. Human rights, equality, democracy: the core interests of football were not in the starting XI until many years later. These basic rights were pressured onto the field as substitutes by outside voices. FIFA has addressed these issues but there's still a long way to go." Hassan al-Thawadi, secretary general of Qatar 2022, criticised her remarks for ignoring the country's recent labour reforms. In May 2022, Amnesty accused FIFA of looking the other way while thousands of migrants worked in conditions "amounting to forced labor", arguing that FIFA should have required labour protections as a condition of hosting.

Shortly before the tournament began, France 24 broadcast a report titled "The plight of migrant workers in Qatar", adding more details to the controversy and how many reform laws have not been followed. In June 2023, Human Rights Watch said it "acknowledges and applauds" reforms in the migrant sector made by Qatar during the World Cup, including the creation of a department for Occupational Health and Safety.

=== Conditions of migrant workers ===
The issue of migrant workers' rights attracted greater attention once the World Cup was awarded to Qatar, with the 2013 investigation by The Guardian claiming that many workers were denied food and water.

After visiting a labour camp in 2012, Sharan Burrows of the ITUC stated that "If two years on [since the award of the 2022 World Cup] the [Qatari] Government has not done the fundamentals, they have no commitment to human rights". The Qatar 2022 Committee said: "Our commitment is to change working conditions in order to ensure a lasting legacy of improved worker welfare. We are aware this cannot be done overnight. But the 2022 FIFA World Cup is acting as a catalyst for improvements in this regard." A video shown to labour rights groups in 2013 showed men living in dilapidated labour camps under unsanitary conditions.

In November 2017, the ILO started a three-year technical cooperation programme with Qatar to improve working conditions and labour rights. Qatar introduced new labour laws to protect migrant workers' rights: Law No. 15 of 2017 introduced clauses on maximum working hours and constitutional rights to annual leave.

=== Deaths of migrant workers ===
The International Trade Union Confederation estimated in 2013 that by the time the competition would be held, without significant changes, up to 4,000 workers could die due to lax safety and other causes. These claims were based upon the fact that 522 Nepalese workers and over 700 Indian workers had died since 2010, when Qatar's bid as World Cup's host had been won, about 250 Indian workers dying each year. The Indian government said the number of deaths could be considered quite normal based on the figure of half a million Indians working in Qatar.

The Wall Street Journal reported in June 2015 the ITUC's claim that over 1,200 workers had died while working on infrastructure and real-estate projects related to the World Cup, and the Qatar Government's counter-claim that none had. The BBC later reported that this often-cited figure of 1,200 workers having died in World Cup construction in Qatar between 2011 and 2013 is not correct, and that the 1,200 number is instead representing deaths from all Indians and Nepalese working in Qatar, not just of those workers involved in the preparation for the World Cup, and not just of construction workers.

In 2019, the Planning and Statistics Authority of the State of Qatar reported that 15,021 non-Qataris had died between 2010 and 2019 in its Vital Statistics Annual Bulletin - Births & Deaths 2019.

In February 2021, another investigative report published by The Guardian used data from embassies and national foreign employment offices to estimate a death toll of 6,500 migrant workers since the World Cup was awarded to Qatar. The figures used by The Guardian did not include occupation or place of work so deaths could not be definitively associated with the World Cup construction programme, but "a very significant proportion of the migrant workers who have died since 2011 were only in the country because Qatar won the right to host the World Cup."

In a September 2021 report, Amnesty criticised Qatar for failing to investigate migrant workers' deaths.

On 8 September 2020, Qatar introduced reforms that apply to all workers, regardless of their nationality; the main reform was wage protection. Qatar introduced a national minimum wage of 1000 Qatari riyals. Additionally, workers who are housed by their employers must be provided with accommodation and food, or accommodation and a food allowance of 300 riyals on top of their wage. The wage protection system included measures to make sure workers knew their entitlements and enforce them.

=== Interactions with foreign companies ===
In 2015, a crew of four journalists from the BBC were arrested and held for two days after they attempted to report on the condition of workers in the country. The reporters had been invited to visit the country as guests of the Government of Qatar. At the start of the tournament, the BBC refused to broadcast Qatar's 2022 FIFA World Cup opening ceremony, instead showing a panel discussion led by host Gary Lineker delivering a critique of Qatar's records on LGBT rights and treatment of migrant workers. Jim Waterson of The Guardian commented that the Qatari authorities "probably hoped [the opening ceremony] would be the moment when the global media finally focused on football rather than human rights".

In March 2021, Hendriks Graszoden, the turf supplier for the 2006 World Cup and for the European Championships in 2008 and 2016, refused to supply Qatar with World Cup turf. According to company spokesperson Gerdien Vloet, one reason for this decision was the accusations of human rights abuses.

On September 28, 2022, Danish sportswear company Hummel unveiled Denmark's "toned down" kits for the tournament in protest of Qatar's human rights record. One of these kits includes a black alternate kit that represents "the color of mourning", which references the dispute between Hummel and World Cup organisers in Qatar in which Hummel claimed that thousands of migrant workers died during the construction of the venues. Hummel said in their statement on their official Instagram:

With the Danish national team's new jerseys, we wanted to send a dual message. They are not only inspired by Euro 92, paying tribute to Denmark's greatest football success, but also a protest against Qatar and its human rights record. That's why we've toned down all the details for Denmark's new World Cup jerseys, including our logo and iconic chevrons. We don't wish to be visible during a tournament that has cost thousands of people their lives. We support the Danish national team all the way, but that isn't the same as supporting Qatar as a host nation. We believe that sport should bring people together. And when it doesn't, we want to make a statement.

Singer Dua Lipa denied speculations that she would be performing in Qatar, stating in her Instagram Stories post that she looked "forward to visiting Qatar when it has fulfilled all the human rights pledges it made when it won the right to host the World Cup." Rod Stewart, meanwhile, claimed he had refused over $1 million to perform at the tournament.

=== Defenses of Qatar and FIFA ===
In March 2022, FIFA president Gianni Infantino claimed in an interview that the Gulf nation is being progressive in terms of the labour rights and migrant rights issues that prevailed previously, adding "I am pleased to see the strong commitment from the Qatari authorities to ensure the reforms are fully implemented across the labour market, leaving a lasting legacy of the FIFA World Cup long after the event, and benefiting migrant workers in the host country in the long term."

In a news conference preceding the tournament on 19 November 2022, Infantino defended criticism of Qatar from the West as hypocritical, stating that "I think for what we Europeans have been doing for 3,000 years around the world, we should be apologising for the next 3,000 years before starting to give moral lessons to people." He asked, "how many of these European companies who earn millions and millions from Qatar or other countries in the region—billions every year—how many of them have addressed migrant worker rights? I have the answer: none of them, because if they change the legislation it means less profits. But we did. And FIFA generated much, much, much less than any of these companies, from Qatar."

Amid popular criticism, political commentary magazine The Economist also provided a defence for FIFA's choice, stating that Qatar was "a more suitable country to host a big sporting event" than both China and Russia, who hosted the 2022 Winter Olympics and the 2018 World Cup respectively, and who both have arguably worse human rights records. Moreover, it added that "Western criticism" failed to "distinguish between truly repugnant regimes and merely flawed ones", and that many "indignant pundits" simply sounded as if they did "not like Muslims or rich people".

== Death of Marc Bennett ==
Marc Bennett was a British travel advisor who died under mysterious circumstances in Doha. Bennett was employed by the Qatar Airways company Discover Qatar to promote the image of Qatar following the nation's selection as the host of the World Cup. After leaving the job and showing interest in a rival Saudi company, Bennett was arrested and tortured. He was found hanged in his hotel room on 25 December 2019. Following his death, Qatar Airways reported that he was arrested for stealing company secrets. The Qatari authorities said that he killed himself, Qatar Airways said this was unrelated to his work because he was a popular and valued former employee. Bennett's family dispute both stories; a British coroner did not record the death as suicide.

== Women's rights ==
Discrimination against women was also criticized. Women in Qatar must obtain permission from their male guardians to marry, study abroad on government scholarships, work in many government jobs, travel abroad, receive certain forms of reproductive health care, and act as the primary guardian of children, even if they are divorced.

In February 2022, a Mexican employee of the World Cup Organizing Committee working as an economist was accused of allegedly having sex outside of marriage. The woman had previously reported rape. However, the male claimed to have been in a relationship with her, after which the woman was investigated for extramarital sex. Women in Qatar face the possible penalty of flagellation and a seven-year prison sentence if convicted for having sex outside of marriage. The criminal case against the Organizing Committee employee was dropped months after she was allowed to leave Qatar. Human Rights Watch welcomed the decision to close the case.

== LGBTQ rights ==
Rights for LGBTQ people in Qatar are essentially nonexistent, with homosexuality as well as campaigning for LGBTQ rights criminalised. As such, when Qatar was selected to host the 2022 FIFA World Cup, the choice to do so in a restrictive nation saw much criticism, with several topics becoming the subject of controversy.

=== LGBT fans ===
==== Public displays of affection ====
As early as 2010, concerns had been raised about the rights of members of the LGBTQ community who would attend the tournament, since homosexuality was illegal in Qatar. After Qatar was chosen as host, Sepp Blatter, the then-president of FIFA, was criticised for apparently jokingly telling a reporter inquiring about these concerns that gay attendees "should refrain from any sexual activities". While apologizing for that statement, Blatter assured that FIFA did not tolerate discrimination, and stated that "[FIFA] don't want any discrimination. What we want to do is open this game to everybody, and to open it to all cultures, and this is what we are doing in 2022."

The Human Rights Watch reported that Qatar had arbitrarily arrested LGBT people and subjected them to ill treatment in detention. The Gay Times reported that while Muslims can be sentenced to death for homosexuality under Sharia law, there have been no known cases of the death penalty being enforced for homosexuality in Qatar.

In 2013, Hassan al-Thawadi stated that everyone would be welcome at Qatar 2022, but warned against public displays of affection because they were "not part of our culture and tradition". The Qatar organising committee seemed to retract this in September 2022, when Football Association (the FA; England's federation) chief executive Mark Bullingham said there had been assurances that LGBTQ couples would not face arrest while holding hands or kissing in public in Qatar. However, shortly before the tournament commenced, former Qatar international player and World Cup ambassador Khalid Salman described homosexuality as a "damage in the mind" in an interview with German broadcaster ZDF, which led to further criticism, including from the German government. The interview was cut short following the comments; Salman later said that his comments had been misrepresented by news agencies.

==== Rumours of homosexuality medical test ====
After rumours and allegations that Qatar would introduce medical screening tests to detect and ban homosexuals from entering the country, LGBTQ rights activist Peter Tatchell said that "FIFA now has no option but to cancel the World Cup in Qatar". However, no such screening test exists. It was later revealed that this proposal came from Kuwait and, while involving other nearby nations, did not involve Qatar.

==== FIFA defence and legacy in football ====
In a news conference on the day before the opening match, confronting renewed criticisms that LGBTQ fans felt unsafe, FIFA president Gianni Infantino continued to defend that "everyone who comes to Qatar is welcome, whatever religion, race, sexual orientation, belief she or he has, everyone is welcome. This was our requirement and the Qatari state sticks to that requirement", and argued that anti-LGBTQ laws "exist in many countries in the world", and "existed in Switzerland [where FIFA is based and Infantino was raised] when they organised the World Cup in 1954."

The BBC published a report based on interviews with LGBTQ fans from Qatar and from Western nations in December 2022. It looked at the effect that the attitude of the organising committee and FIFA (particularly Infantino) towards LGBTQ rights in preparation for and during the World Cup had on fans' feelings and views of football culture and homosexuality in football. Many fans reflected that they had previously felt that the footballing world was at or approaching a positive and supportive place in terms of accepting LGBTQ fans and players. The British attitude noted in the BBC report was that fans considered LGBTQ people being treated equally to be an uncontroversial matter of fact, and a fundamental human right, with fans having become used to seeing overt support from the footballing world. By instead seeing FIFA allow LGBTQ rights to revert to a debate, and one based on culture rather than human rights, during the World Cup, these fans were shocked; the BBC also noted that there was shock at Infantino repeatedly saying that people who wanted FIFA to condemn Qatar's stance on LGBTQ rights were only trying to stir a culture war.

It concluded that the legacy of the Qatar World Cup would be to set back LGBTQ acceptance in football, discouraging LGBTQ fans from feeling that they have a place. The attitude of FIFA, suggesting that it will not support LGBTQ rights as "divisive", was said by the report to make football seem more hostile to LGBTQ players; it quoted Finnish women's footballer Linda Sällström ironically asking what FIFA would do to the numerous openly gay female players set to compete at the 2023 FIFA Women's World Cup if an armband with implicit awareness of homosexuality had been enough to warrant punishment in 2022.

=== Promotion of LGBT rights in Qatar ===
In January 2022, openly gay Australian footballer Josh Cavallo suggested he would support the World Cup happening in Qatar if it could cause laws to be changed, describing this possibility as "a fantastic opportunity" for the nation, having previously expressed fear of travelling to the nation before the organising committee told him he would be welcome.

In October 2022, Human Rights Watch called on FIFA to press Qatar to launch reforms that protected LGBTQ people after a Qatari official denied that there were cases of LGBTQ people beaten in jail. Qatari officials also rejected allegations that there were conversion therapy centers in Qatar.

The openly queer BBC Sport television pundit Alex Scott reported throughout the World Cup in Qatar, saying ahead of the opening match that there were people who had suggested she stay at home, but she had instead wanted to use the platform of being at the World Cup to highlight and address the issues, which she did on several occasions.

In his 2024 autobiography, Mutproben, openly gay footballer Thomas Hitzlsperger strongly opposed the World Cup in Qatar, saying that he turned down an offer to be a field commentator. Hitzlsperger also criticised Beckham and England's Jordan Henderson, whom he had already criticised for playing in a Saudi club while allegedly supporting gay rights. Henderson had stated regarding the World Cup in Qatar that it could be seen as a positive sign and opportunity for Qatar to change its views on homosexuality.

=== Joe Lycett stunt ===
On 13 November 2022, a week before the tournament was due to kick off, British comedian Joe Lycett released a video criticising David Beckham for his lucrative sponsorship deal promoting the World Cup, due to the country's stance on LGBTQ rights. In the video, Lycett promised to give £10,000 to charities that support queer people in football if Beckham pulled out of the deal. If Beckham did not pull out of the deal, he said he would shred the money during a livestream on 20 November, just before the opening ceremony. After the deadline passed with no response from Beckham or his representatives, Lycett broadcast such a livestream; it was later revealed that this was a ruse, with Lycett saying that he had donated the money to charity, having had no intention from the start of destroying money.

=== Team apparel ===
==== OneLove armband ====
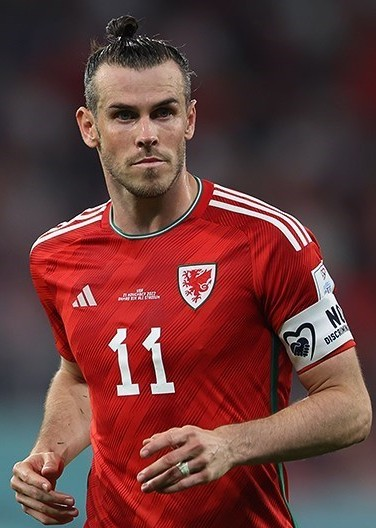
Wales captain Gareth Bale wearing FIFA's "No discrimination" armband in the tournament, instead of the OneLove one endorsed by the Football Association of Wales.

Several European captains – those of England, Wales, Belgium, Denmark, Germany, Switzerland and the Netherlands – were planning to wear OneLove armbands, which feature a multi-colored design and the phrase "OneLove". This was intended "to promote inclusion and send a message against discrimination of any kind". Widely seen as tacit support of the LGBTQ+ community, some felt it targeted Qatar's anti-LGBTQ laws. FIFA, who prohibit the use of non-mandated armband designs in their competitions, did not immediately comment on the issue. On 21 November, after the tournament had started but before any of the European nations had played, however, the relevant football associations were told the players would receive yellow cards if they wore the armband. It was later revealed by the Danish Football Association (DBU) that FIFA had not planned to tell the European teams of the potential punishment for wearing the OneLove armband; that the FA called FIFA to their team hotel for an emergency meeting on 21 November, the day of England's first match; and that at this meeting FIFA told the collected teams that a yellow card would be the "minimum" punishment for wearing the armbands, with other possibilities including banning the captains altogether.

FIFA were criticised by fans and the football associations for forcing captains to choose between representing their countries and using their voice, with the Pride in Football LGBTQ+ supporters group also criticising the players for not doing so anyway, saying: "A token gesture from the start that has turned into another embarrassment from FIFA. FIFA have had since September to sort this, and yet they wait until now to threaten sanction. Fifa is denying players their fundamental and most basic human right to freedom of speech. Countries, teams and players are happy to defend LGBTQ+ people until they themselves are at risk. LGBTQ+ Qataris face a bigger punishment than just a yellow card. The gestures and the activism ended quite easily at the thought of reprimand."

There were multiple incidents relating to LGBT symbols in Group B matches, with the United Kingdom and United States (England, Wales, and the US were all in Group B) governments also criticising FIFA for introducing player punishment for the armbands. Later in the week, Irish foreign minister Simon Coveney criticised the world football governing body in his country's parliament, describing it as "absolutely extraordinary" that FIFA not only took the decision to ban the armbands, but kept changing their reason as to why, including shifting the blame by saying it was because of other national teams. Coveney also said: "That is a political intervention by FIFA to limit freedom of expression, which is worthy of significant mention and criticism." In the media, British newspaper Metro changed its website logo to a rainbow to protest the FIFA decision. Alex Scott wore the armband pitch-side before the England vs Iran match. Scott had earlier (during the opening ceremony, which the BBC elected not to broadcast, holding a studio panel discussion of Qatar controversies instead) criticised Infantino for a rambling speech in which he, in a seeming attempt to downplay the controversies of the tournament, claimed he understood what gay people in Qatar (among other minorities) felt like because he had experienced discrimination before.

On 22 November, the German Football Association (DFB) announced that they were taking legal action against FIFA for the decision, submitting a case to the Court of Arbitration for Sport. The German team played their first match the next day, and covered their mouths with their hands during their team photo as a protest against FIFA, signalling that they had been silenced. Qatari television hosts later mimicked the gesture when Germany were eliminated from the World Cup in the group stage, seen to be mocking the campaign. The FA, England football's governing body, also announced they were exploring legal options, saying that it understands World Cup rules would only administer a fine for kit violations and that FIFA may be attempting to enforce IFAB rules, which could allow them to implement other sanctions and which England believe should not apply to the World Cup, instead.

On 23 November, the DBU, as well as revealing FIFA's threat of significant player punishment, confirmed that they and other UEFA teams were discussing a blanket withdrawal from FIFA, and said that they would not support the reelection of Infantino as FIFA president while they were still members. On the same day, a Danish TV 2 reporter wearing a OneLove armband while broadcasting from outside a stadium was approached by security officials, who told him to remove the armband and tried to block the camera.

Fans began buying OneLove armbands after the ban and according to Badge Direct, who produce the armbands, they were sold out by 24 November. In response, FIFA allowed teams to wear the official "no discrimination" armbands intended for the quarter-finals during the group stage.

==== Other team items ====
On 21 November, FIFA rejected Belgium's away jerseys due to the word "Love" being on the inside of the collar, even though it was unrelated to any campaign supporting LGBTQ rights.

The United States included a rainbow in their team branding, replacing the red stripes in their logo with differently-coloured ones to create a Pride rainbow, but only used this for facilities used by the team, not on their jerseys. The Football Association of Wales said they would not withdraw from FIFA over the armband ban, but were otherwise heavily critical and put up rainbow flags at their outdoor training grounds in protest.

=== Rainbow flag confiscations ===
Flag of Pernambuco

On several occasions the Qatari organisers promised to comply with FIFA rules on promoting tolerance, including LGBTQ issues. In December 2020, Nasser Al-Khater, the Qatar World Cup chief executive, assured that, in accordance with FIFA's inclusion policy, it would not restrict the display of pro-LGBTQ imagery and symbols (such as rainbow flags) at matches during the World Cup, saying: "When it comes to the rainbow flags in the stadiums, FIFA have their own guidelines, they have their rules and regulations, whatever they may be, we will respect them."

However, in April 2022, a senior security official overseeing the tournament stated that there were plans to confiscate pride flags from spectators, claiming it to be a safety measure to protect the fans from altercations with spectators that are anti-LGBTQ. Fare network criticised the report, arguing that actions against the LGBTQ community by the state were of a greater concern to those attending the World Cup than the actions of individuals.

A Brazilian journalist had his phone seized by authorities when people mistook a flag representing his state, Pernambuco, which includes a rainbow within a larger design, for an LGBTQ flag. Other Brazilian fans from the region reported similar incidents of having flags taken from them because of the rainbow.

=== Other rainbow apparel ===
==== Group B ====
US journalist Grant Wahl was detained for half an hour, before the United States' opener against Wales. He was wearing a black shirt with a rainbow on the front. He was told his shirt was not allowed due to it being "political". After 25 minutes, a security commander allowed him into the venue and apologised, and he also received an apology from a representative of FIFA. Wahl later died from an aortic rupture secondary to an aortic aneurysm on 10 December while reporting on a match in Qatar.

Female Wales fans and Football Association of Wales (FAW) staff (including former Wales women's football captain Laura McAllister) had rainbow bucket hats, produced by the FAW, confiscated at the same game. The FAW said they were "extremely disappointed" and they would be raising the incidents with FIFA the following day; FIFA subsequently opened talks about rainbow apparel with Qatari officials on 22 November.

According to BBC reporter Natalie Perks, she and a cameraman were prevented from entering Al Bayt Stadium ahead of the England vs United States Group B game on 25 November because the cameraman was found to have a rainbow-decorated watch and strap in his possession, which had been gifted to him by his son. Perks said they were eventually permitted entry to the stadium after dialling a number aimed specifically at media personnel to help them if they encountered difficulties. According to The Guardian, a reporter for The Times newspaper was questioned at the same stadium around the same game because of a wristband they were wearing.

==== Other matches ====
Despite FIFA reassuring fans that rainbow coloured apparel would be allowed inside the stadium after the Group B incidents, Qatari officials continued to confiscate rainbow-coloured items from several fans.

One fan attending a Group A final round game involving the Dutch national team on 29 November claimed to have had a security guard scream in his face, was forced to take off a multi-coloured baseball cap he was wearing and then was forced to strip his clothes, including his underwear. He then said his cap disappeared and security staff claimed he wasn't wearing it at all, only for it to emerge from behind a scanner. Then, when his ticket was being checked he was told to stand in the corner, where he was surrounded by seven people, four of whom were police and one of whom was wearing a FIFA uniform, where further threats were made.

In a match between Portugal and Uruguay, in which Uruguay lost 2–0, a protestor invaded the pitch, waving a rainbow flag.

=== Homophobic football chants ===
A perennial issue in the sport in some countries, homophobic football chants were reported to be heard at the first matches involving Mexico and Ecuador, particularly from Ecuador fans towards Chile and the Qatar team during the tournament's opening match, with FIFA opening hearings to determine disciplinary action. Mexico was subject of a second disciplinary measure by FIFA after the final group stage match against Saudi Arabia because of homophobic chants during the course of the game.
