= LGBTQ people in association football =

Homophobia has been widespread in men's association football, also known as soccer, throughout the world. There are a number of openly LGBTQ players in women's association football, with relatively few in the men's game. Most of the men's players have come out after retirement.

== Background ==
In 2006 journalist Simon Barnes wrote that homophobia in football was entrenched and would never change, and in 2009 journalist Matt Williams wrote that being a gay professional player in football was still a taboo, Football magazine When Saturday Comes described homosexuality as a "continuing taboo" in the sport in 2013. One male player who came out after retiring said that there are at least as many closeted gay male players as there are openly LGBT+ female players. John Amaechi, the first NBA player to come out, in 2014 blamed football's "toxic" culture for the lack of openly gay players, while English former footballer Clarke Carlisle called for more education to be given to players to combat homophobia.

In June 2022, it was revealed that homophobia made up the majority of online abuse aimed at footballers, 40% for men and 27% for women.

In July 2023, Quinn became the first openly transgender player at a World Cup.

== By country ==
=== Africa and the Middle East ===
==== Egypt ====
In June 2026, the Iran vs. Egypt World Cup match was designated a 'Pride Match'; homosexual relations in both countries remain illegal.

==== Iran ====
In June 2026, the Iran vs. Egypt World Cup match was designated a 'Pride Match', which Iran's manager Amir Ghalenoei said his team would ignore.

==== Qatar ====
Ahead of the 2022 FIFA World Cup in Qatar, LGBT fans were told to be "respectful of the host nation" by British politician James Cleverly; same-sex activity is illegal in Qatar. LGBT organisations in England called on pubs and bars not to stream games.

==== Saudi Arabia ====
In July 2023, English player Jordan Henderson, known for his support of LGBT rights, was criticised for signing for a Saudi Arabian club.

==== South Africa ====
Eudy Simelane (1977–2008), a player on the South Africa women's national football team, was an openly lesbian player who was raped and murdered for being gay.

Phuti Lekoloane was an openly gay male player who played in the South African third division.

=== Americas ===
==== Canada ====
Former MLS player David Testo, having been released by Montreal Impact the previous month, affirmed he was gay in an interview on the French Canadian division of Radio Canada that was published on 10 November 2011.

==== United States ====
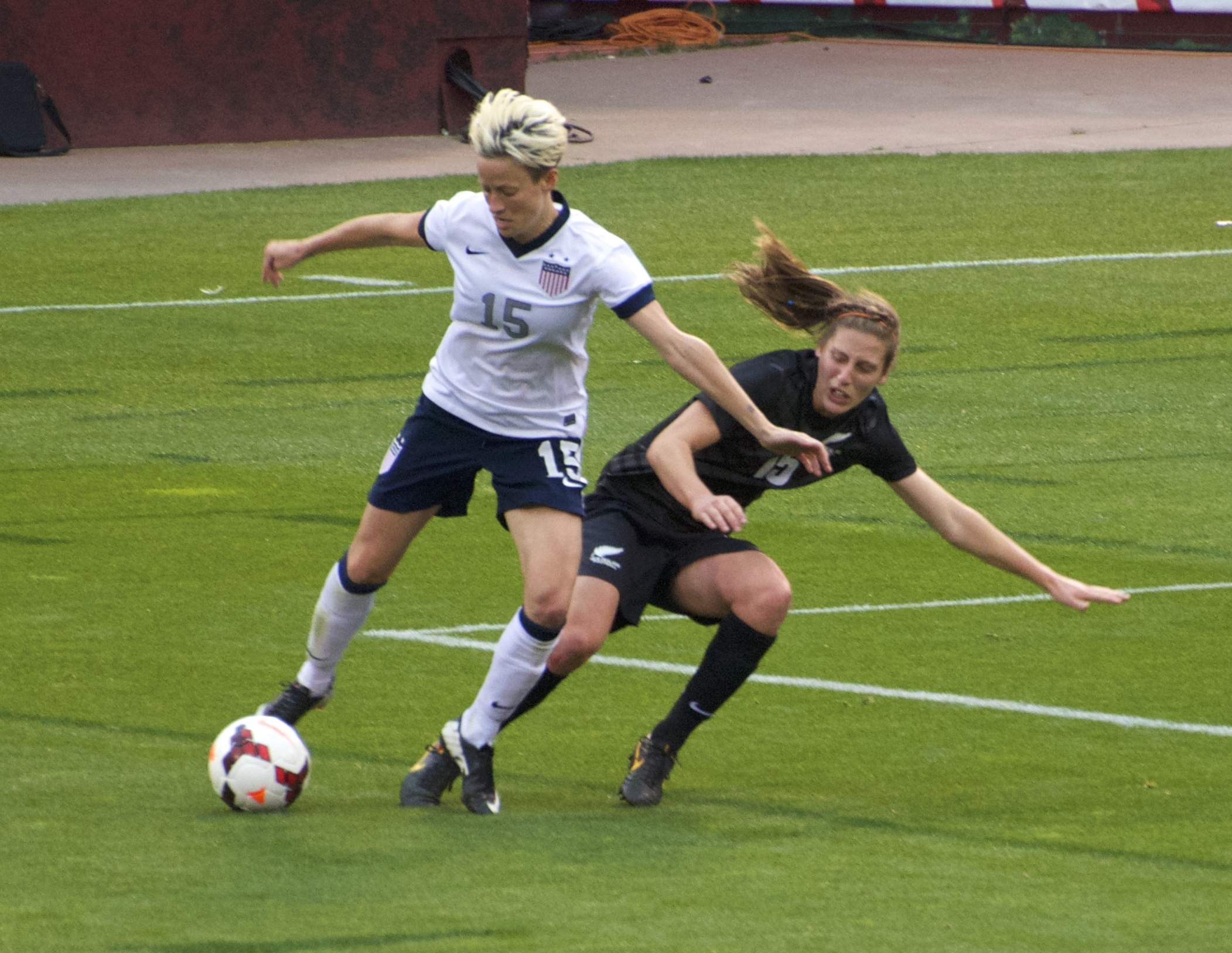
Megan Rapinoe battles for the ball during a friendly match against New Zealand in 2013.

On 15 February 2013, midfielder Robbie Rogers, who had been released by Leeds United a few weeks earlier, came out after announcing his retirement from professional football. Rogers later stated that being openly gay was "impossible" in the sport. He later returned to football, signing a multi-year contract with the Los Angeles Galaxy. Rogers stated in December 2013 that he had not received any contact from other, secretly, gay players.

In October 2020, San Diego Loyal FC player Collin Martin, who is openly gay, accused a Phoenix Rising FC opposition player of homophobic abuse in a match. San Diego Loyal walked off in protest, forfeiting the game. A few days later Phoenix Rising player Junior Flemmings received a six-match ban for the incident, and was placed by Phoenix Rising officials on administrative leave for the remainder of his contract term, which concludes on 30 November 2020. Flemmings has denied making the alleged comments.

Several female players have come out as LGBT as well. Megan Rapinoe, Abby Wambach, and Ali Krieger are notable examples.

In March 2025, San Diego FC's opening home match of the 2025 MLS season was marred by repeated homophobic chants from the crowd, which the club condemned.

==== Mexico ====
In June 2018, Mexican fans engaged in homophobic chanting during the 2018 FIFA World Cup game against Germany.

Mexican football fans are known for shouting out "¡Puto!" (a Spanish homophobic slur), when the opposing team's goalkeeper is about to perform a goalkick. The chant has been shouted during Liga MX matches as well as in matches with the Mexico national team. However, these chants have led to fines and have also led Liga MX, FIFA, and CONCACAF to implement protocols regarding them.

The first time these protocols were initiated were during a series of matches between Club León and Monarcas Morelia in 2019.

During the 2021 CONCACAF Nations League Finals, fans chanted out the homophobic chant during both the semifinal against Costa Rica and the final match against the United States. This has led CONCACAF to initiate their anti-discrimination protocol by stopping the match in order to warn fans of getting ejected for saying the chant.

In June 2021 the Mexican Football Federation were punished by FIFA for alleged homophobic chants from their fans during the 2020 CONCACAF Men's Olympic Qualifying Championship. They were fined up to $65,000 and were forced to have the Men's National Team to play two World Cup qualifying games behind closed doors.

In June 2023, during the 2023 CONCACAF Nations League semi-final between Mexico and the United States, there were homophobic chants from Mexican fans.

==== Brazil ====
In 2007, Richarlyson was named on Brazilian television as gay by the administrative manager of a rival team. When Richarlyson undertook legal action, the complaint was thrown out by the judge, who stated "football was a virile masculine sport and not a homosexual one." Richarlyson would later come out as bisexual in 2022.

Jamerson Michel da Costa, nicknamed Messi, is the first Brazilian footballer who came out as homosexual while pursuing his professional career, in September 2010.

In January 2019, former Botafogo footballer Douglas Braga said that he had quit football aged 21 as it was not possible for him to be both gay and a footballer.

Many Brazilian footballers refuse to wear shirt number 24 for fear of being labelled as gay, as the number 24 is associated with homosexuality in Brazil. This derives from the number 24 in Jogo do bicho being assigned to the deer – veado in Portuguese, which sounds like viado, a slur for a gay man – and from the Portuguese for 24, vinte e quatro, sounding like vim de quatro ("I came on all fours", making reference to the doggy style position).

After the 2014 FIFA World Cup, a shout imported from Mexican fans "oooh, puto" was adopted as a sensation by several fan groups organized as "oooh, bicha", shouted at rival team goal kicks. After interruptions due to homophobic demonstrations and the COVID-19 crisis, the shout fell into disuse.

Several renowned Brazilian women's internationals are openly lesbian, including Bárbara, Cristiane, Debinha and Marta.

Emerson Ferretti, historic goalkeeper for EC Bahia, was elected president of the club in 2023. Ferretti had declared himself homosexual in August 2022.

In 2024, the minor league football player Polidoro Júnior, famous for affairs with Brazilian celebrities, claimed to have had a relationship with Pabllo Vittar.

=== Europe ===
==== Austria ====
In March 2024, national team manager Ralf Rangnick dropped three players for homophobic chanting following a club game.

==== Bulgaria ====
In 2006, PFC Levski Sofia president Todor Batkov called referee Mike Riley a "British homosexual", following Riley's controversial sending off of Cedric Bardon during the UEFA Cup quarterfinal game against Schalke 04.

==== Czech Republic ====
In 2019, Barbora Votíková, a Paris Saint-Germain FC and Czech Republic women's national football team player, came out as gay.

In February 2023, Sparta Prague and Czech Republic national team midfielder Jakub Jankto came out as gay, the first active men's international player to do so.

==== Denmark ====
Anders Lindegaard is one of the few footballers to have spoken out against the intolerance of homosexuality in football and the absence of openly gay players from the professional game, in 2012.

==== England ====
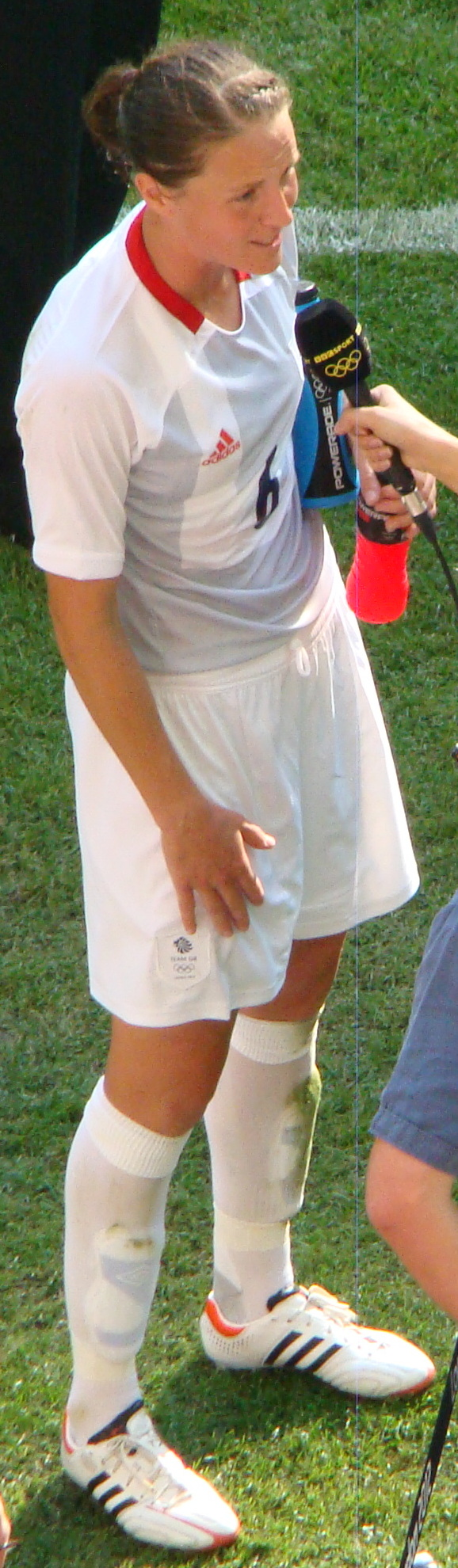
Casey Stoney, who captained the England women's team, is a lesbian.

In England, women's football has historically been more welcoming than men's football. English Football Hall of Fame inductee Lily Parr was openly lesbian at a time when female homosexuality, whilst (unlike male homosexuality) not illegal, was very much a taboo in British society. In August 2010, England coach Hope Powell was named in 68th place on The Independent newspaper's Pink List of influential lesbian and gay people in the UK. In 2011 the Belfast Telegraph reported the formation of the Belfast Braves, who claimed to be the first lesbian football team in the UK. In recent years far more players have come out with several high-profile players entering civil partnerships or marriage with their partners once they became legal in 2005 and 2015 respectively.

Justin Fashanu, older brother of fellow footballer John Fashanu, was the first men's professional footballer to come out as gay, after he agreed to an exclusive with tabloid newspaper The Sun on 22 October 1990. Fashanu was interviewed for the July 1991 cover story of Gay Times, and Fashanu revealed that no club had offered him a full-time contract since the story first appeared. He committed suicide in May 1998.

In 2013, David Haigh became the first openly gay managing director of an English football club. Liam Davis, a non-league player with Gainsborough Trinity, revealed in 2014 that he had been out as gay for four years; he is the country's only openly gay male semi-professional player.

On 16 May 2022, Blackpool player Jake Daniels came out as gay, making him the only current gay male professional footballer in the UK. He said that doing so would allow him to be "free and confident", and it was described by the BBC as a "watershed moment".

No player has ever played in the English Premier League while openly gay; German player Thomas Hitzlsperger, who had played in the league while closeted, stated in January 2014 that he thought it would be a long time before this happened. Players such as John Ruddy, Richarlison and Lucas Digne have spoken about their belief that a gay teammate would be accepted and supported. In July 2020, a current Premier League player revealed he was gay but would or could not come out.

On multiple occasions there have been reports of homophobic chanting by fans attending matches, and arrests made or fines issued to fans and clubs. As of January 2026, there are no openly gay male footballers in England's top four men's divisions, with Jake Daniels having left Blackpool F.C. when his contract expired in June 2025.

==== France ====
Olivier Rouyer came out after retiring as a player and coach.

A gay amateur team operates in Paris under the name Paris Foot Gay. The club's highest-profile supporter from within the professional game has been former France national football team player Vikash Dhorasoo (who is heterosexual), whilst a number of leading French professional clubs have signed their charter against homophobia. The club ran into controversy in 2009, however, when an amateur side, Creteil Bebel, refused to play them due to the "principles" of Paris Foot Gay. Additionally, Ouissem Belgacem left Toulouse FC after five years of having to hide his homosexuality. In 2021, he published his autobiographic novel Adieu ma honte ["Goodbye to my shame"] to denounce homophobia in association football.

The issue returned to the spotlight in 2010 when amateur FC Chooz refused to register Yoann Lemaire, who had been with the club for 14 years, due to him being gay as they claimed it might lead to "trouble" with his teammates.

In March 2019, former player Patrice Evra denied making homophobic comments against Paris Saint-Germain.

In August 2019, a Ligue 2 match between Nancy FC and Le Mans FC was halted following homophobic chants from the stands against the league. France's Secretary of State for Equality, Marlene Schiappa reacted on Twitter and congratulated the referee for interrupting the match. Later that month a game between Nice and Marseille was halted due to homophobic chanting.

In May 2022, Idrissa Gueye was not included in the PSG team sheet for what manager Mauricio Pochettino revealed to be "personal reasons", and not an injury. This brought the media spotlight on Gueye; RMC Sport reported that he had refused to play in the match due to PSG's shirts featuring the rainbow flag in support of the LGBT movement, an initiative taken by Ligue 1 for the occasion of the International Day Against Homophobia, Transphobia and Biphobia. He had also notably missed the same fixture in the previous season, with the reasoning behind his non-participation then being that he was suffering from gastroenteritis. For his controversial absence against Montpellier, Gueye received backlash and calls for sanctions from Rouge Direct, an organization against homophobia, and île-de-France politician Valérie Pécresse, among others. Senegalese president Macky Sall expressed his support for Gueye, justifying the position by stating that Gueye's "religious beliefs must be respected".

Following the controversy surrounding Idrissa Gueye, French former international referee Nicolas Potier publicly came out.

In May 2023, further players refused to participate in anti-homophobia actions, with French sports minister Amelie Oudea-Castera calling for sanctions against them.

In May 2024, Monaco player Mohamed Camara covered up anti-homophobia badges on his shirt. He later received a four-match ban for this.

==== Georgia ====
In November 2017, while playing for Dutch club Vitesse, Georgian footballer Guram Kashia wore a rainbow armband as part of the Dutch initiative Coming Out Day. His show of support for gay rights led to protests outside the Georgian Football Federation's headquarters demanding his removal from the national team, at which eight people were arrested. He described himself as being "proud to support equal rights".

==== Germany ====
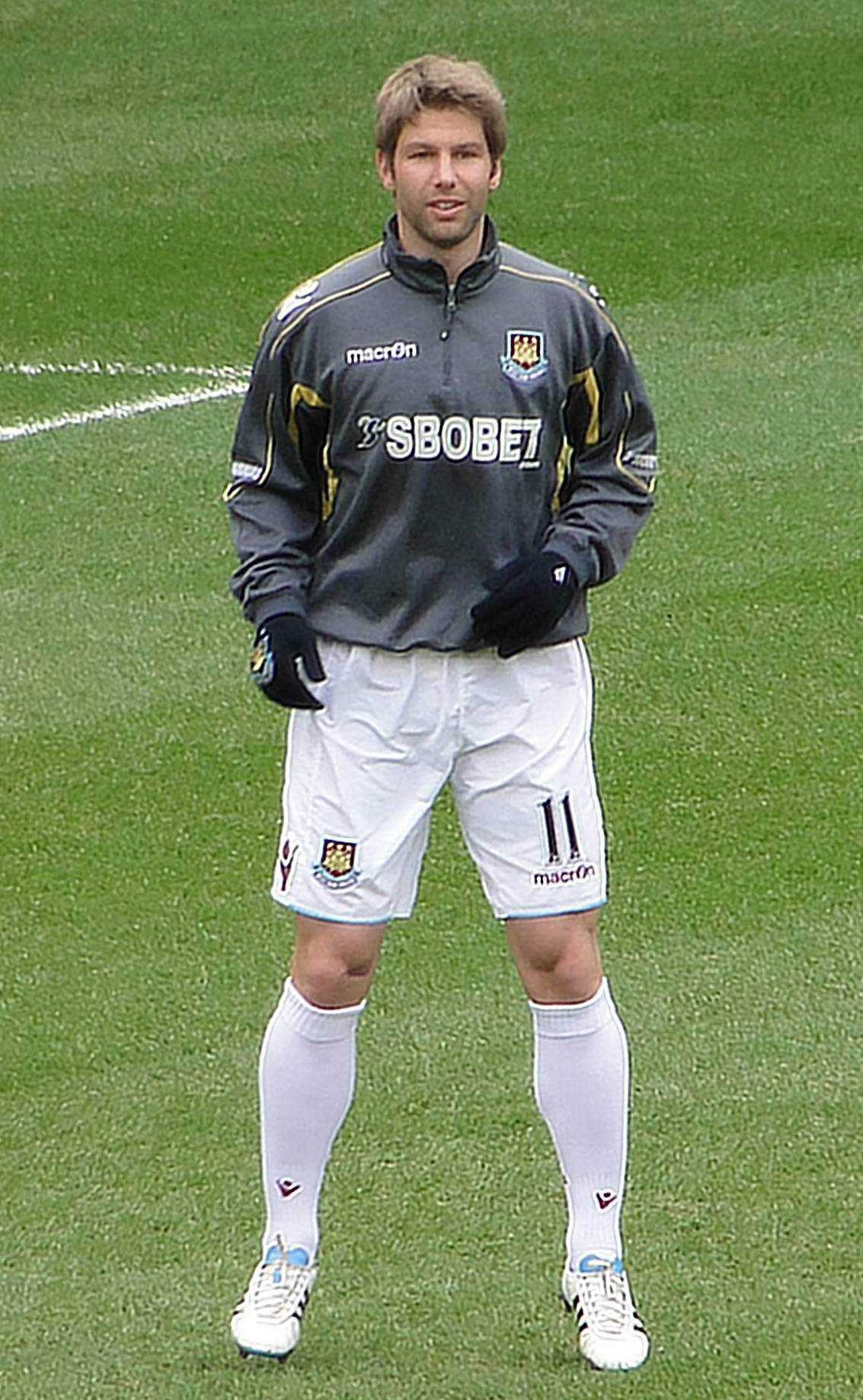
Former German international Thomas Hitzlsperger came out as gay after retiring, writing in 2024 Mutproben, an autobiography about this issue.

The Hamburger SV (HSV) player Heinz Bonn (1947–1991) was the first Bundesliga player to be publicly known as being gay, but only after his death. He played for HSV from 1970 to 1973. He was found murdered in his flat in Hannover on 5 December 1991, apparently by a male prostitute, according to police investigators, although the crime has never been solved. The historian Werner Skrentny has said at the time Bonn was playing, journalists had little interest in the private lives of footballers and it would have been unthinkable for him to come out. HSV has its own official LGBT fan club. Blue Pride was founded in 2006. It was renamed Volksparkjunxx in 2012.

Marcus Urban, born 1971, played with the East Germany national youth football team and as an amateur in the second division club Rot-Weiß Erfurt. From the age of 13, he had been hot-housed at a specialist sports boarding school in Erfurt but at the age of 20, in 1991, when he was about to become a professional footballer, he gave up the sport. He came out to friends and family in 1994, and in 2007 publicly spoke to the media about his homosexuality and the difficulties that gay footballers experience. He said that the pressure of having to pretend to be something he was not 24 hours a day was too much for him. He became widely known after a biography titled Versteckspieler: Die Geschichte des schwulen Fußballers Marcus Urban ('Hidden Player: the story of the gay footballer Marcus Urban') was published in 2008.

Urban has since become a spokesperson and campaigner on diversity issues in sport and the workplace. He advises the German Olympic Sports Confederation and the Sports Committee of the German Federal Parliament, as well as businesses and non-profit institutions.

In December 2006, Rund magazine published an interview done over a two-year period with two gay footballers living secret lives. One was married and said his wife did not know of his sexual orientation nor realise he was involved in an intimate relationship with his childhood friend. The other often brought a female friend to social events.

In March 2010, former manager Rudi Assauer said that "If a player came to me and said he was gay I would say to him: 'You have shown courage'. But then I would tell him to find something else to do. That's because those who out themselves always end up busted by it, ridiculed by their fellow players and by people in the stands. We should spare them these witch hunts."

On 8 January 2014, Thomas Hitzlsperger, who had retired from professional football in September 2013, announced that he was gay. Before coming out, in September 2012, Hitzlsperger had publicly spoken about players coming out. In September 2014 he said that he believed the sport was tackling homophobia. He wrote an autobiography titled Mutproben about his experiences as a gay footballer.

In June 2021, at the delayed UEFA Euro 2020 tournament, Germany national football team captain Manuel Neuer was investigated by UEFA for wearing a rainbow captain's armband. The potential fines were dropped as the UEFA said that it was not a political statement but "a team symbol for diversity and thus for a good cause".

In October 2024, Kevin Behrens apologised after refusing to sign a rainbow-themed shirt, saying it was "gay shit". He was punished by his club.

==== Hungary ====
On 15 June 2021, Hungary played their opening match against Portugal at the delayed UEFA Euro 2020 tournament, with Hungarian fans allegedly displaying homophobic banners. UEFA announced an investigation.

==== Ireland ====
In June 2019, the Irish women's national football team captain Katie McCabe and fellow Irish international Ruesha Littlejohn announced that they were in a relationship. McCabe described women's football as being "very accepting" regarding gay footballers.

==== Netherlands ====
In April 2009, former Dordrecht'90 striker John de Bever married his manager and friend Kees Stevens. De Bever played at the 1996 FIFA Futsal World Championship and was named World Futsal player of the year in 1997.

In June 2021 on NOS podcast "de schaduwspits", an anonymous Eredivisie player came forward as to being homosexual. He did not reveal his identity however, because of the backlash he would receive.

==== Norway ====
Thomas Berling retired from professional football after coming out in 2000, citing widespread homophobia in the football community as the reason.

Several female players have come out as homosexual, including Bente Nordby and Linda Medalen.

In June 2015, a Bærum SK player was given a straight red card for calling his Sandnes Ulf opponent "gay" during a 1. divisjon match.

In October 2016, Stabæk Fotball became the first European club to host a pride parade preceding their home fixture against Sarpsborg 08. The team continues to host a pride parade preceding a home fixture each season.

==== Portugal ====
In February 2026, a Champions League match between Real Madrid and Benfica was stopped after Vinicius Junior accused Gianluca Prestianni of racism. Prestianni later received a six-match ban for homophobic abuse of Vinicius. Prestianni then received a worldwide ban from FIFA.

==== Scotland ====
In May 2019, Hibernian chief executive Leeann Dempster, a lesbian, said that Scottish football was ready for its first publicly gay player.

In June 2019, Partick Thistle launched their new away kit for the 2019–20 season which featured LGBT rainbow details, becoming the first Scottish club to do so.

In June 2022, Scottish referees Craig Napier and Lloyd Wilson came out as gay.

In September 2022, Zander Murray became the first openly gay male senior player in Scotland. He later said he was "blown away" by the support he had received. In December 2023 he announced that he would be retiring.

==== Spain ====
In 1934, Ana María Martínez Sagi, partner of writer Elisabeth Mulder, became a Director of FC Barcelona, the first woman to do so in Spanish football's history.

The first gay and lesbian football supporters' group to be officially accepted by a Spanish club was founded in February 2009, and supports FC Barcelona.

A popular football chant in Spanish stadiums is maricón, a slur for a gay man.

Spanish women's international Laura del Río is a lesbian.

Atlético Madrid football player Rafael Rodríguez Rapún (1912–1937) was poet Federico García Lorca's partner in life.

Referee Jesús Tomillero, the first to come out as gay, received police protection over homophobic death threats.

In October 2022, Iker Casillas tweeted that he was gay, before later deleting the tweet. He said he was hacked and apologised. Carles Puyol replied to the tweet in a joking manner, and later apologised for doing so; Puyol had been a vocal public supporter of the Barcelona women's team, with players suggesting they would speak with him on the matter.

==== Sweden ====
Anton Hysén, son of former Sweden international Glenn Hysén, came out as gay in March 2011 whilst playing for Utsiktens BK, then a Swedish football Division 2 side.

==== Turkey ====
Halil İbrahim Dinçdağ was a referee with the Turkey Football Federation for 13 years, but was sacked from this position due to his homosexuality. The Trabzon Board of Referees and the Turkish Football Association decided that he was not eligible for the role as he was previously excused from the military service for being homosexual. The Board of Referees has an association policy that excludes those that having not completed the military duties due to a mental illness (including homosexuality) are ineligible as referees, although normally homosexuality is not considered as such by the Turkish constitution. The Turkish Football Federation was fined ₺23,000 after the incident.

One of Turkey's famous football commentators, Erman Toroğlu, argued that Dinçdağ should not be given his referee position back due to the professional reasons such as the possibility for making wrong decisions related to his homosexuality.

In an interview with the Turkish journalist Canan Danyıldız, one of the famous Turkish football managers, Yılmaz Vural, was asked about the presence of LGBT people in Turkish football. He said that although he has never witnessed any homosexual interaction in the locker rooms, he knows that there exist gay football players in the Turkish League. He added that he does not believe homosexuality inhibits the talents of the players and that everyone should be free to live their personal lives the way that they want to. He finalized his words by saying that gay Turkish football players can never come out of the closet since everyone knows about the case of the former referee Dinçdağ.

Another important interview about LGBT people in Turkish Football was held between the journalist Elif Korap and the famous former football player and present football commentator Rıdvan Dilmen. When he was asked whether or not he knew of any gay Turkish football players, his answer was straightforward: "Of course, as there are in any other profession." Dilmen criticized other people in the Turkish football industry for not admitting the presence of LGBT people, since they are afraid of being considered as homosexual as well. Although Dilmen said that he does not approve the discrimination against the LGBT people in the Turkish football, on contrary, he argued that he would still disinherit his own kid for being gay once he was reminded about a negative comment he made during an interview in 1989.

In 2021, was reported that Galatasaray S.K. midfielder Taylan Antalyalı received homophobic abuse on Twitter for wearing a pride-themed T-shirt.

=== Oceania ===
==== Australia ====
The first male professional player to come out was Andy Brennan, who did so in May 2019, when playing for Green Gully in the National Premier Leagues Victoria, a semi-professional league. In October 2021, A-League Men player Josh Cavallo became the first openly gay active top-flight footballer in Australia. In October 2025, Cavallo said that football remained "toxic" for gay players, and in January 2026 he accused former club Adelaide United of homophobia.

No male Australian internationals are openly gay, though a number of the Australian women's national team are, including Sam Kerr, Michelle Heyman and Tameka Yallop (née Butt).

== List of LGBTQ footballers ==
=== Men ===
Name	Nationality	Career	Date of coming out	Notes & references
Aslie Pitter	England	1970s–1980s	1970s	
Reine Feldt	Sweden	1965–1975	1986 (death)	
Justin Fashanu	England	1978–1997	1990	
Thomas Berling	Norway	1999–2001	2001	
Marcus Urban	Germany	1990–1991	2007	
Olivier Rouyer	France	1973–1990	2008	
Al-Saadi Gaddafi	Libya	2000–2007	2009	National team captain, though his career was largely arranged by his father, Libyan leader Muammar Gaddafi. He was outed as bisexual in the West through leaked security reports on his family.
Messi	Brazil	2009–2019	2010	
Jonathan De Falco	Belgium	2007–2010	2010	
Anton Hysén	Sweden	2008–	2011	
David Testo	United States	2003–2011	2011	
Robbie Rogers	United States	2005–2017	2013	
Thomas Hitzlsperger	Germany	2001–2013	2014	
Liam Davis	England	2009–	2014	
Phuti Lekoloane	South Africa	2010–	2015	
Matt Hatzke	United States	2008	2015	
Adam McCabe	United States	2011–	2016	
Collin Martin	United States	2013–	2018	
Matt Pacifici	United States	2016	2019	
Andy Brennan	Australia	2010–	2019	
Richard Kone	Ivory Coast	2019–	2019	Stated that his homosexuality was the reason he was made homeless before competing in the Homeless World Cup; more recently has a girlfriend.
Thomas Beattie	England	2008–2015	2020	
Stephen Laybutt	Australia	1995–2010	2020	
Josh Cavallo	Australia	2017–	2021	
Jahmal Howlett-Mundle	England	2015–	2021	
Ouissem Belgacem	Tunisia	2004–2008	2021	
Jake Daniels	England	2022–	2022	
Richarlyson	Brazil	2002–2021	2022	
Emerson Ferretti	Brazil	1991–2007	2022	
Zander Murray	Scotland	2009–2024	2022	
Hugo Marlo	Spain	2020s	2022	Trans man who experienced transphobic abuse when he came out while playing for a women's team.
Jakub Jankto	Czech Republic	2015–2025	2023	First male footballer to come out while an active international player.
Alberto Lejárraga	Spain	2014–	2023	
Tony Powell	England	1968–1983	2025	
Marumi Yamazaki	Japan	2006–2023	2026	Trans man who played in the women's WE League, before announcing his transition following his retirement.
Ignacio Lago	Argentina	2018–	2026	

=== Non-binary ===
Name	Nationality	Career	Notes & References
Percy Kelly	England	1940s–1950s	Played for Workington under Bill Shankly, but more notable as an artist, Kelly was a cross-dresser and, in later life, had feminising hormone therapy. Kelly changed name to Roberta in 1985; sources typically still refer to Kelly with male pronouns, while acknowledging Kelly's womanhood.
Jaiyah Saelua	American Samoa	2004–	American Samoa national football team player. Identifies as faʻafafine, a third gender in Polynesian society.
Quinn	Canada	2013–	Canada women's national soccer team player.
Grace Wilson	Australia	2017–	Australia women's national under-20 soccer team player.

== See also ==
- Gay Football Supporters Network
- Homosexuality in American football
- Homosexuality in Australian rules football
- Homosexuality in modern sports
- International Gay and Lesbian Football Association
- List of IGLFA member clubs
- List of LGBTQ sportspeople
- Mario (2018 film)
- OneLove
