= Phuti Lekoloane =

South African footballer, entrepreneur and LGBTQ activist

Phuti Lekoloane also known as Phuti Minaj, is a South African soccer player and LGBTQ activist, from Moletjie, Ga Kolopo a rural township near Polokwane in the Limpopo province. He played for JDR Stars, a Pretoria-based organization, on their second division team as goalkeeper, and now does so for Tornado F.C., also in the SAFA Second Division. He is Africa’s first openly gay male footballer, having come out publicly in July 2015. His nickname Phuti Minaj came from his mentor John Moshoeu, who caught him twerking while watching a video from Nicki Minaj.

== Early life ==
Phuti Lekoloane was born in Moletjie, Polokwane in the Capricorn District Municipality, the largest Limpopo province in South Africa. He was raised in Tembisa. His family has a farm going back generations; their “extended family owns about 300 hectares in Mooiplaas, Mpumalanga, about 40km from Polokwane.”

Lekoloane says he has always known he was gay, being born as such, and that his family was accepting and supportive. However, he was bullied at school for being gay.

When he was about 13, he was playing netball and was pulled into being the football goalie when the team was short of players. He has been playing football since he was fifteen. At seventeen he was playing for Highlands Park F.C. and realized he had a talent for the sport. He also played for Platinum Stars F.C.’s development team before they were moved to Royal Bafokeng Stadium.

== Career ==
=== JDR Stars ===
Lekoloane played for JDR Stars, an ABC Motsepe League team, a Pretoria-based organization, on their SAFA Second Division team as goalkeeper. He wears the 91 shirt in honor of John Moshoeu, a South African Nations Cup champion in 1996, who was his mentor. "[Moshoeu] is fondly remembered for wearing the number 10 jersey", Phuti says, "9 plus 1 equals 10;" he sought permission from Moshoeu's family, and they gave their blessing. His nickname, Phuti Minaj, was given to him by Moshoeu who caught him twerking while watching a video from Nicki Minaj.

He is South Africa’s first openly gay footballer, after coming out publicly in December 2015. His teammates have been mostly supportive, Lekoloane thinks because he has a good attitude and accepts himself. However opposition teams and their fans have taunted and harassed him. Lekoloane has learned to channel that hatred into motivation to make things better for other gay footballers. He left because of homophobia, including a teammate who believed being gay was on par with being a murderer. Being gay remains a crime in many African countries; he has met many closeted gay soccer players. South Africa was the first country on the continent to legalize same-sex marriage. Lekoloane’s goal is to be the first openly gay player in the South African Premier Division of the Premier Soccer League.

=== Dealing with homophobia ===
Lekoloane has dealt with homophobia in the sport; at a team’s trial in the mid-2010s, the organization’s representatives said they did not know how to accommodate him, and thought he would be bad for their image. As of October 2017, he has been on trial with five Premier Soccer League teams but they were concerned about his sexuality. Lekoloane noted that while European teams have tried to eradicate homophobia—for instance, the 2016 #RainbowLaces campaign developed by Skins sportswear, to raise awareness about homophobia in sport with Pride in Diversity,—South Africa has not; while they have worked on issues of racism in association football. Homophobia, and toxic masculinity has long existed in football, going back to before Justin Fashanu, the first professional gay footballer, who never came out but his sexuality was an open secret, faced it from his own coach in the 1980s. It continued to Robbie Rogers, and others since. The atmosphere for LGBTQ people in South Africa is still dangerous. The South African Institute of Race Relations found that 40% “who identify as LGBTQIA+, 49% if they are black, know someone who has been murdered because of their sexuality. Those who are not murdered are discriminated against.”

He feels the homophobia has held him back professionally from playing in the Premier Soccer League. He has vowed to be visible and stand up to the discrimination:

“My purpose in life is to pave the way for the LGBTQI community in football, to fight for inclusion and equality,” Lekoloane said. “There are a lot of gay footballers, but they are scared to come out. I have met a lot of gay guys who had to retire from football because of discrimination.

=== Tornado F.C. ===
Lekoloane joined Athlete Ally, a sports-focused LGBTQ advocacy organization. He left JDR Stars because of the homophobia, but was later recruited by Tornado F.C., another SAFA Second Division team. Doing so, he had to move from Johannesburg to East London, Eastern Cape, a place known for violence against LGBTQ people. The same Institute of Race Relations study showed LGBTQIA+ identifying people “are three times more likely to be attacked in the Eastern Cape than in any other province in the country”. Team manager, Yanga Nyobo, daughter of Tornado’s former chairman, Siphiwo “Mawawa” Nyobo, came out to him as gay, and stated the team strives for diversity. He has become the club’s top goalkeeper.

In October 2018 he was nominated for the Feather Awards’ Sports Personality of the Year award for “iconic personalities and achievers who inspire” the LGBTQI communities.

In 2019, Phuti Minaj founded, a Phuti Lekoloane foundation, a not profit organisation which aims to provide development and training about the LGBTIQ community in sports, Phuti Lekoloane is also the founder of LGBTI Legacy Games, a football tournament that focuses on tackling homophobia out of sports.

In 2021, Phuti Minaj as Lekoloane is famously known in the football circles was nominated for both Role Model of the year and Sports personality of the year for the feather awards 2021, Phuti Lekoloane walked away with the feather awards sports personality of the year.

== See also ==
- Homosexuality in modern sports
- Homosexuality in association football
- LGBTQ rights in South Africa
- Timeline of LGBTQ history in South Africa
- Pride parades in South Africa
- LGBTQ tourism in South Africa
- LGBTQ pride flag of South Africa
