= Marcus Urban =

German footballer

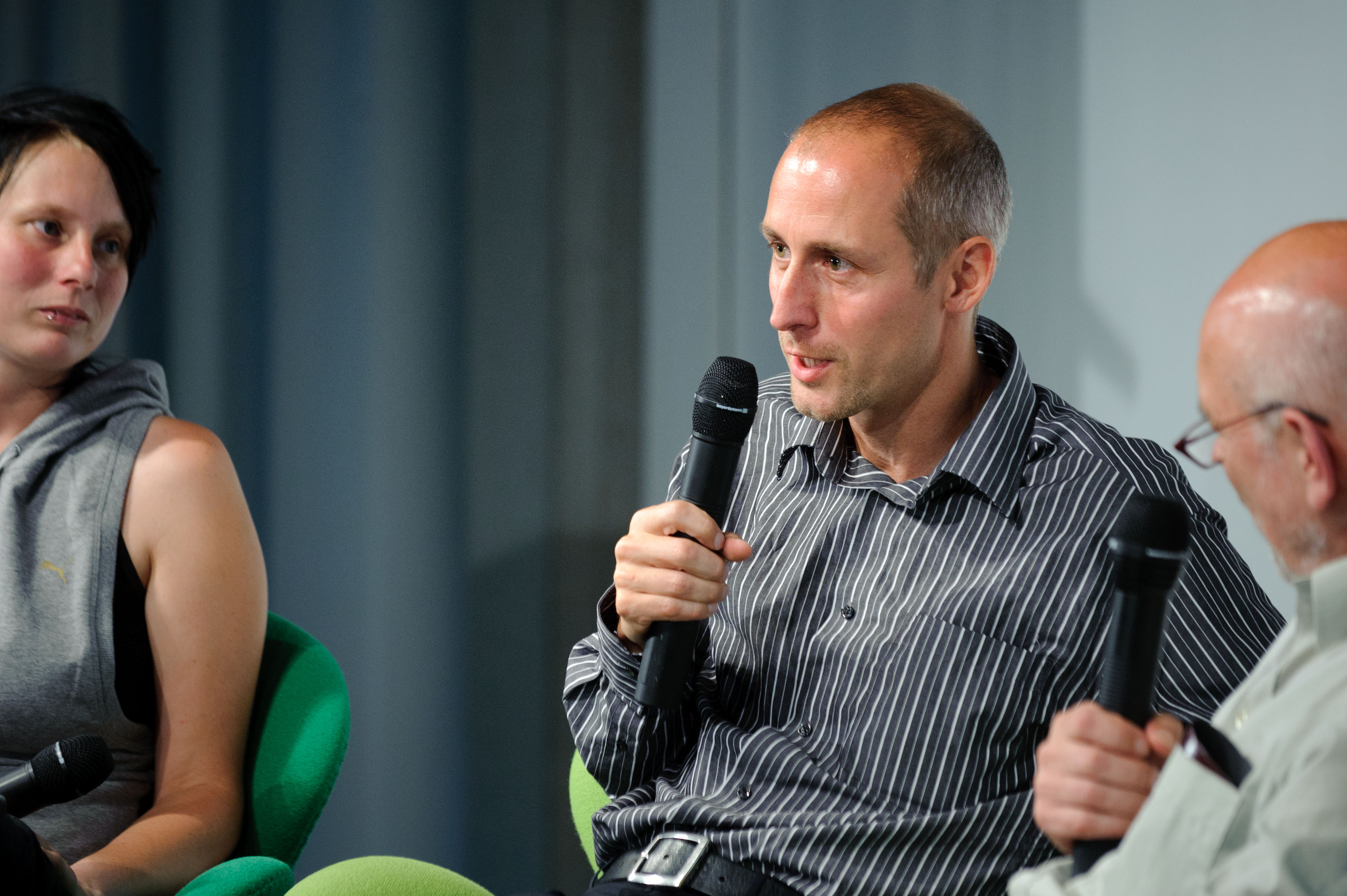
- Marcus Urban in 2011
- Born: 4 August 1971; Weimar, East Germany
- Other name: Marcus Schneider
- Education: Bauhaus-Universität, Weimar
- Occupations: Diversity adviser; life coach
- Organization(s): FC Rot-Weiß Erfurt; Verein für Vielfalt in Sport und Gesellschaft
- Known for: Football player; spokesperson for LGBT issues
Association football career
- Position: Midfielder
Youth career
- FC Rot-Weiß Erfurt
Senior career*
Years	Team	Apps	(Gls)
1990–1991	FC Rot-Weiß Erfurt	0	(0)
International career
1986–1989	East Germany (youth)		
- * Club domestic league appearances and goals
- Website: www.marcus-urban.de

Marcus Urban (born 4 August 1971, earlier Marcus Schneider) is a former German football player. He played with the East Germany national youth football team and in the second division club Rot-Weiß Erfurt in the 1980s and early 1990s. Several years afterwards he came out as a gay man. He has spoken publicly about the difficulties that gay footballers experience, and he is now a spokesperson and campaigner on diversity issues in sport and the workplace.

As a child, he took on his step-father's surname, Schneider, but as an adult he changed it back to his mother's maiden name.

In 2008, the sports journalist Ronny Blaschke published an authorised biography of Urban. This is titled Versteckspieler: Die Geschichte des schwulen Fußballers Marcus Urban ('Hidden Player: the story of the gay footballer Marcus Urban')

== Life ==
Urban was born and grew up in the city of Weimar, which was then in the German Democratic Republic (East Germany). From 1984, when he was 13, until 1991 he attended a boarding sports school in the nearby city of Erfurt, support by the 2nd division Bundesliga club FC Rot-Weiß Erfurt (Erfurt city football club; Red and White are the club colours). Such schools were widely used in the former Eastern bloc countries. He trained with East German world sports champions and olympic medal winners. He played for the East Germany national youth football teams from 1986 to 1989.

In 1990, he was given an amateur contract to play for Rot-Weiß Erfurt. He played against future players of the Germany national team such as Bernd Schneider, Thomas Linke, Steffen Freund and Frank Rost. He was about to become a professional football player, but in 1991, he decided to quit due to the pressure of having to hide his homosexuality from the football world.

In 1991, he began studies in urban and regional planning at Bauhaus-Universität in Weimar, graduating in 2000 with a master's degree in engineering, specialising in renewable energy. During this time, he spent a semester at Università degli Studi di Napoli Federico II in Naples. He undertook his civilian service year in 1997, working for an organisation that provided special therapies for disabled children based on theatre, music and art.

Urban came out to family and friends in 1994, but it was not until 13 years later, in 2007, that he publicly came out in an interview with the newspaper Welt am Sonntag in which he spoke about the difficulties of gay football players. A year later, his biography was published. Grand Hotel Pictures, a Berlin film production company, started developing a film based on the book in 2009, but as at July 2017, nothing had been released.

Today, he is an adviser on diversity issues and also works as a life coach with individuals and organisations, specialising in the areas of self-confidence, diversity and intercultural skills. He makes appearances on TV, radio and in print media, discussing his experiences as a gay man in sport, and his work in this area. Urban advises the Deutscher Olympischer Sportbund, (German Olympic Sports Confederation) and the Sports Committee of the German Federal Parliament, as well as businesses and non-profit institutions.

Urban is on the management team of the Verein für Vielfalt in Sport und Gesellschaft ('Association for Diversity in Sport and Business'). In March 2010 he co-founded the diversity expertise network Fußball für Vielfalt ('Football for Diversity'), originally called Fußball gegen Homophobie. This is a project of the de:Bundesstiftung Magnus Hirschfeld ('Federal Foundation of Magnus Hirschfield'), an organisation that aims to carry on the work of the pioneering social scientist Magnus Hirschfeld (1868-1935), researching LGBT issues and seeking to prevent social discrimination against the LGBT community in Germany.

As at May 2017, Marcus Urban lives in Berlin with his partner. He plays football in the over 40s team for Hertha BSC.

== See also ==
- Homosexuality in association football
- List of LGBT sportspeople
