= Heinz Bonn =

German footballer (1941–1991)

Personal information
- Date of birth: 27 January 1941
- Place of birth: Siegen, Germany
- Date of death: November 1991 (aged 50)
- Place of death: Hannover, Germany
- Height: 1.68 m (5 ft 6 in)
- Position: Defender

Youth career
- SuS Niederschelden

Senior career*
Years	Team	Apps	(Gls)
- Sportfreunde Siegen
- Wuppertaler SV
1970–1973	Hamburger SV	13	(0)
- Arminia Bielefeld
- * Club domestic league appearances and goals

Heinz Bonn (27 January 1941 – November 1991) was a German footballer who played as a defender.

== Career ==
Bonn began his career in the youth team at SuS Niederschelden, before signing for Sportfreunde Siegen. At the age of 22, following Sportfreunde Siegen's relegation from the Oberliga to the Verbandsliga, Bonn signed for second-tier side Wuppertaler SV. In 1970, Bonn signed for Bundesliga club Hamburger SV for a fee of DM 75,000. Bonn only made 13 Bundesliga appearances for Hamburg, with his time at the club being hampered by a meniscus injury that required four operations during his time at the club. In 1973, Bonn signed for 2. Bundesliga club Arminia Bielefeld.

== Death and personal life ==
On 5 December 1991, Bonn's body was found in his apartment in the Hanoverian district of Linden. After last being seen alive in Hannover on 27 November 1991, it was estimated that Bonn, who had been stabbed multiple times, had died a week prior to his body being found. The culprit for Bonn's murder has never been found.

Bonn is today considered the first German professional football player known to be homosexual, although his homosexuality was only discovered following his death.
