= Paris Foot Gay =

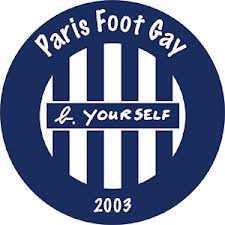
- Full name: Paris Foot Gay
- Nickname(s): Les Gays
- Short name: PFG
- Founded: 2003
- Dissolved: 2015

Paris Foot Gay (abbreviated to PFG) was an amateur, local league football club from Paris, the capital of France. The team was made up of around 30% homosexual players. It was founded in 2003 and dissolved in 2015.

From 2007 onwards, the club was in a partnership with Paris Saint-Germain, the city's sole top-flight club. Vikash Dhorasoo, a heterosexual former French international and PSG player, was formerly the club's patron. Alain Cayzac, PSG's president at the time of the deal, became PFG's honorary president in 2010.

== Charter ==
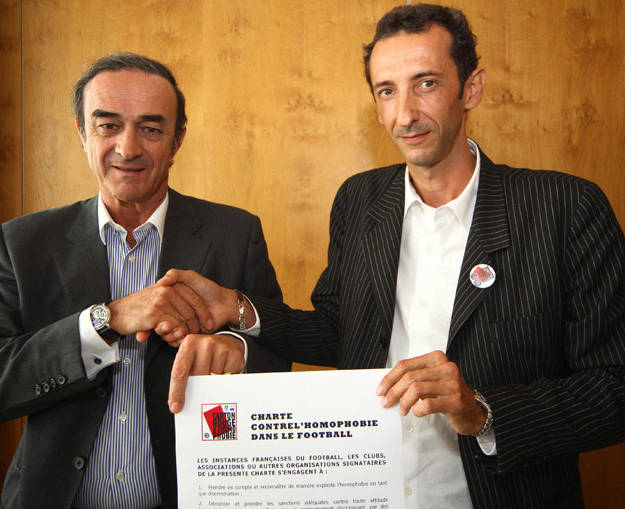
Jean-Louis Triaud, President of Girondins de Bordeaux of Ligue 1, signs the charter on 14 October 2010.

In addition to its team, the club had the goal of combatting homophobia in football and wider society. It composed a charter, which was ratified by nine professional clubs. The first club to sign it was Paris Saint-Germain, the capital's sole top-flight club, on 5 September 2007. The two clubs agreed on a partnership in the same deal. On 29 November 2012, Nice, the third signee (since 7 November 2009), were struck from the agreement following homophobic chanting by their fans against their rival, Bastia. Paris' City Council signed the charter on 31 May 2011.

== Créteil Bébel incident ==
On 4 October 2009, Créteil Bébel, a Créteil-based club composed entirely of practicing Muslims, refused to play PFG due to their religious convictions. Bébel were permanently expelled from the local football association as a result.

== Dissolution ==
The club announced in September 2015 that it would stop operations.

== See also ==
- LGBT rights in France
