= Jesús Tomillero =

Spanish association football referee

Jesús Tomillero Benavente (born 24 December 1994) is a Spanish football referee. He was the first Spanish referee to come out as gay, and faced abuse and threats of violence that led to police protection. He founded the organisation Roja Directa to combat homophobia in sports.

== Biography ==
Tomillero was born in La Línea de la Concepción in Andalusia. When he was three, his father, also named Jesús, was murdered. His mother put him and his younger brother in a children's home in El Puerto de Santa María for a few months before they were adopted by an aunt. He left school at the age of 14.

Tomillero began refereeing at the age of 11. In 2015, he was the first Spanish referee to come out as gay. He left his role in March 2016 after being abused by the kit man of Peña Madridista Linense in an under-19 game; the assailant received a nine-game ban and a €30 fine. He returned to refereeing in September, and was again abused from the stand; death threats were sent to him online and he was assigned police protection.

== Activism ==
In September 2016, Tomillero spoke to the European Parliament about homophobia in sport. In the same year, he set up the foundation Roja Directa ("Straight Red"). In January 2022, he was given the Social Action award from the Regional Government of Andalusia's Equality Minister Rocío Ruiz for the foundation's work.

Tomillero, whose aunt was a city councillor, joined the conservative People's Party (PP) at the age of 17, and spoke of a desire to become a city councillor in charge of sports. In 2019, he announced that he had left the party and cited several reasons: their relations with far-right party Vox, allegedly using him to attract gay voters, and the discipline they had taken against him for claiming that over 90% of PP members are gay.

== Personal life ==
In 2017, Tomillero published an autobiography Volar sin barreras ("Flying without Barriers").

In December 2016, Tomillero appeared on the Telecinco reality show Sálvame Snow Week. His partner David broke up with him during the show, alleging infidelity. The pair reconciled before he returned to the show the following year; he intended to propose marriage live on air, but his partner did not pick up the telephone. Tomillero said in 2019 that he would never do such a show again, as it had hurt his personal and professional image.
