= Thomas Hitzlsperger =

German footballer

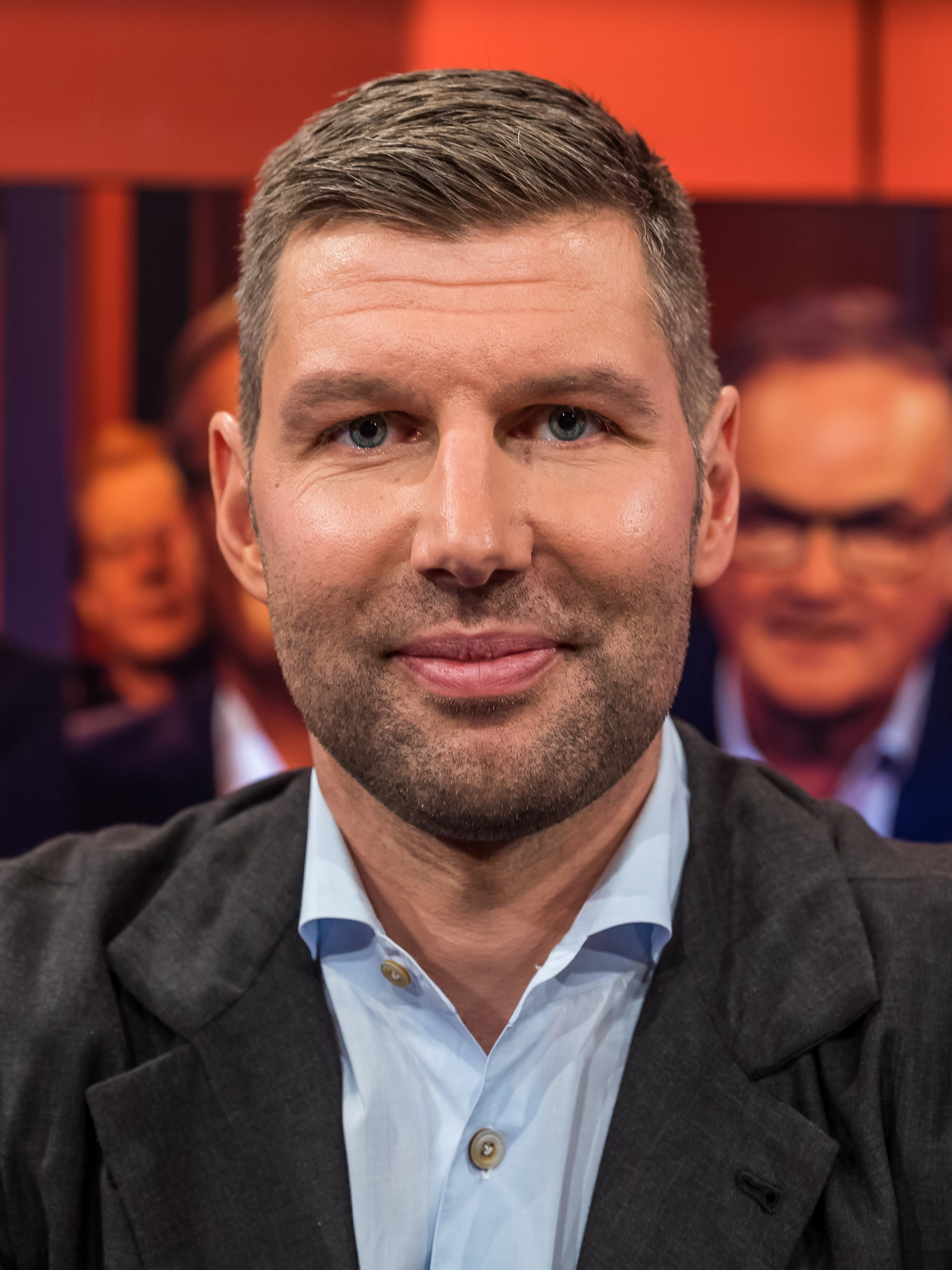
- Hitzlsperger in 2022

Personal information
- Full name: Thomas Hitzlsperger
- Date of birth: 5 April 1982 (age 44)
- Place of birth: Munich, West Germany
- Height: 1.84 m (6 ft 0 in)
- Position: Midfielder

Team information
- Current team: Hellas Verona (board member)

Youth career
- 1988–1989: VfB Forstinning
- 1989–2000: Bayern Munich
- 2000–2001: Aston Villa

Senior career*
Years	Team	Apps	(Gls)
2001–2005	Aston Villa	99	(8)
2001	→ Chesterfield (loan)	5	(0)
2005–2010	VfB Stuttgart	125	(20)
2010	Lazio	6	(1)
2010–2011	West Ham United	11	(2)
2011–2012	VfL Wolfsburg	6	(0)
2012–2013	Everton	7	(0)
Total		259	(31)

International career
2001	Germany U20	4	(1)
2002–2004	Germany U21	20	(3)
2004–2010	Germany	52	(6)
Medal record
Representing Germany
FIFA World Cup
Bronze medal – third place	2006
UEFA European Championship
Runner-up	2008
- * Club domestic league appearances and goals

Thomas Hitzlsperger (born 5 April 1982) is a German football executive and former professional player who played as a midfielder. He is currently a board member at Serie B club Hellas Verona.

As a player, Hitzlsperger spent the early part of his career with Aston Villa in England, before returning to Germany to play for Stuttgart, where he was a member of the team which won the Bundesliga in 2007. In 2010, he signed for Italian side Lazio, before moving back to England to join West Ham United later that year. He then had brief spells with Wolfsburg and Everton.

Hitzlsperger also represented the Germany national team, earning 52 caps and being selected for the 2006 World Cup and Euro 2008. Following a series of injuries, he retired from football in September 2013. After his retirement, he came out as gay, the highest-profile male footballer in the world to do so.

In February 2019, Hitzlsperger was appointed head of sport at VfB Stuttgart, later rising to the position of CEO. He stepped down from this role in March 2022. In 2025, he joined Hellas Verona as a board member.

== Club career ==
=== Early career ===
After joining the VfB Forstinning youth team in 1988, Hitzlsperger signed to the Bayern Munich Junior Team, but agreed to leave at the end of the 1999–2000 season.

=== Aston Villa ===
After a short trial with Celtic in August 2000, Hitzlsperger joined Aston Villa on a free youth transfer from Bayern Munich. He made his Aston Villa debut in a 3–0 home defeat to Liverpool on 13 January 2001 as an 84th-minute substitute for Jlloyd Samuel; it was his only appearance during his first season in England.

Whilst at Aston Villa, Hitzlsperger was briefly loaned out to Second Division club Chesterfield during the 2001–02 season, making his debut in a 1–0 home win against Kidderminster Harriers in the Football League Trophy second round. On 21 November, his link was extended for another month. In all he made six appearances for the Spireites, five of which were in the league. He was recalled by Aston Villa during the second month of the loan spell however, as the Birmingham club had several players injured or suspended. On 20 April 2002, away to already relegated Leicester City, he hit the post after five minutes, from which Peter Crouch opened the scoring from the rebound; Hitzlsperger later scored his first senior goal in the 2–2 draw, from a solo run.

Hitzlsperger moved to Aston Villa first team following the arrival of new manager Graham Taylor. On 14 December 2002, his last-minute 30-yard strike past Russell Hoult sealed a 2–1 win over rivals West Bromwich Albion. He later played a significant part in the Aston Villa side that finished sixth under David O'Leary, before falling out of favour the following season. Hitzlsperger left Aston Villa as a fan favourite, and stated that he might return to the club when the opportunity comes. He gained the nickname Der Hammer (The Hammer) during his time at Villa Park, due to his powerful left-foot shot from long-range. A fluent speaker of English, he acquired an unusual Brummie-German hybrid accent during his spell at Villa.

=== Stuttgart ===
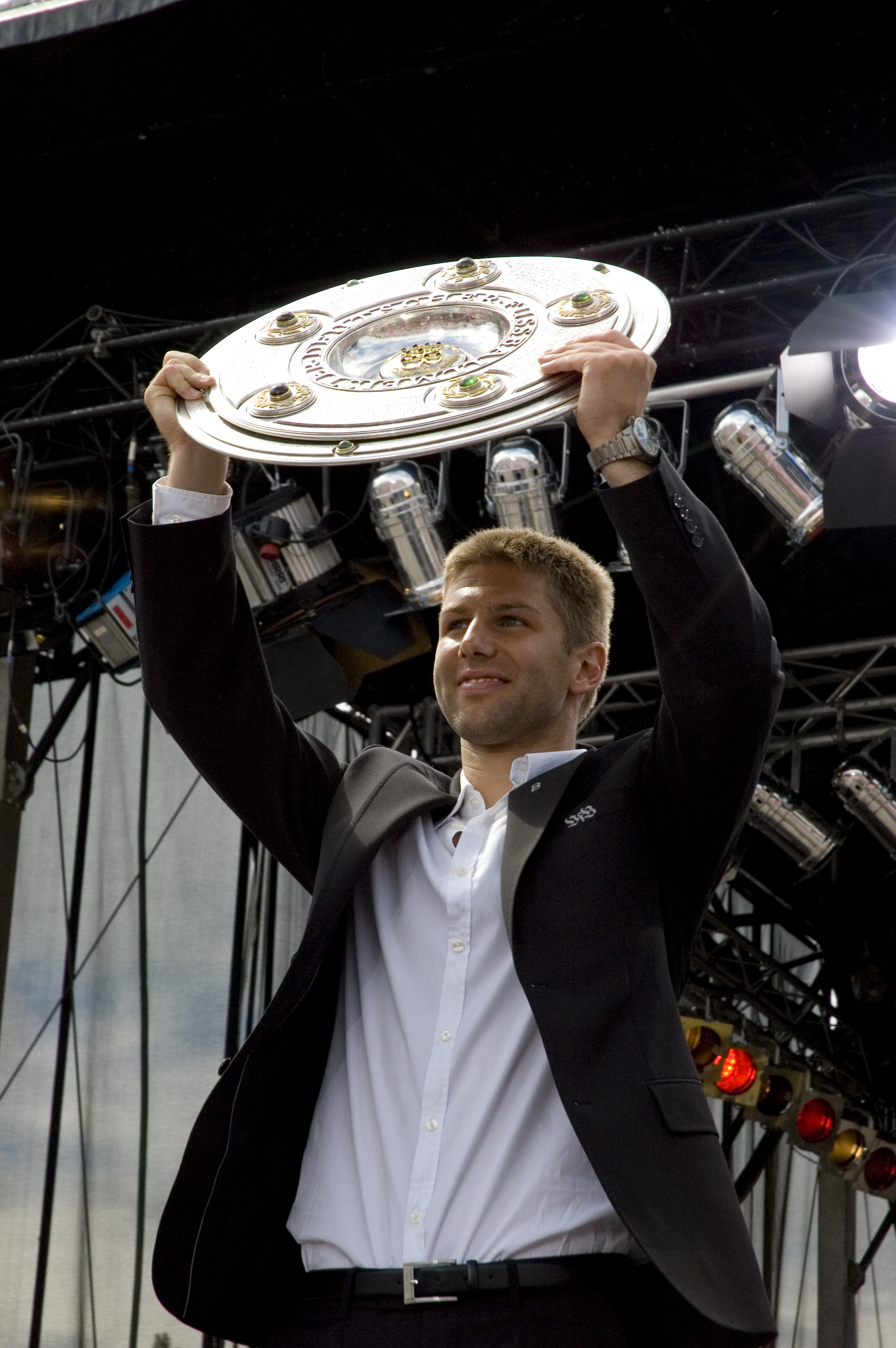
Hitzlsperger celebrates winning the Bundesliga with VfB Stuttgart in 2007

Hitzlsperger signed for VfB Stuttgart in the summer of 2005, having left Aston Villa on a Bosman free transfer. He became a regular for Stuttgart, particularly in his second season in which the team won the Bundesliga title. Hitzlsperger made a large contribution to their success, playing in 30 of the team's 34 league matches and scoring seven times. He scored a crucial equaliser in the 27th minute of Stuttgart's final match of the season against Energie Cottbus – had Stuttgart lost that match, Schalke 04 would have won the title. In the end, a 63rd-minute goal by Sami Khedira secured the title for Stuttgart.

On 14 August 2007, Hitzlsperger extended his contract until the summer of 2010. On 22 July 2008, he was appointed the new captain by manager Armin Veh following the departure of Fernando Meira. On 1 December 2009, he was deposed as team captain by Stuttgart's new manager Markus Babbel.

=== Lazio ===
On 31 January 2010, Hitzlsperger moved to Lazio on six-month contract, for around €550,000. He scored his only goal for Lazio on 15 May in a 3–1 win against Udinese.

=== West Ham United ===
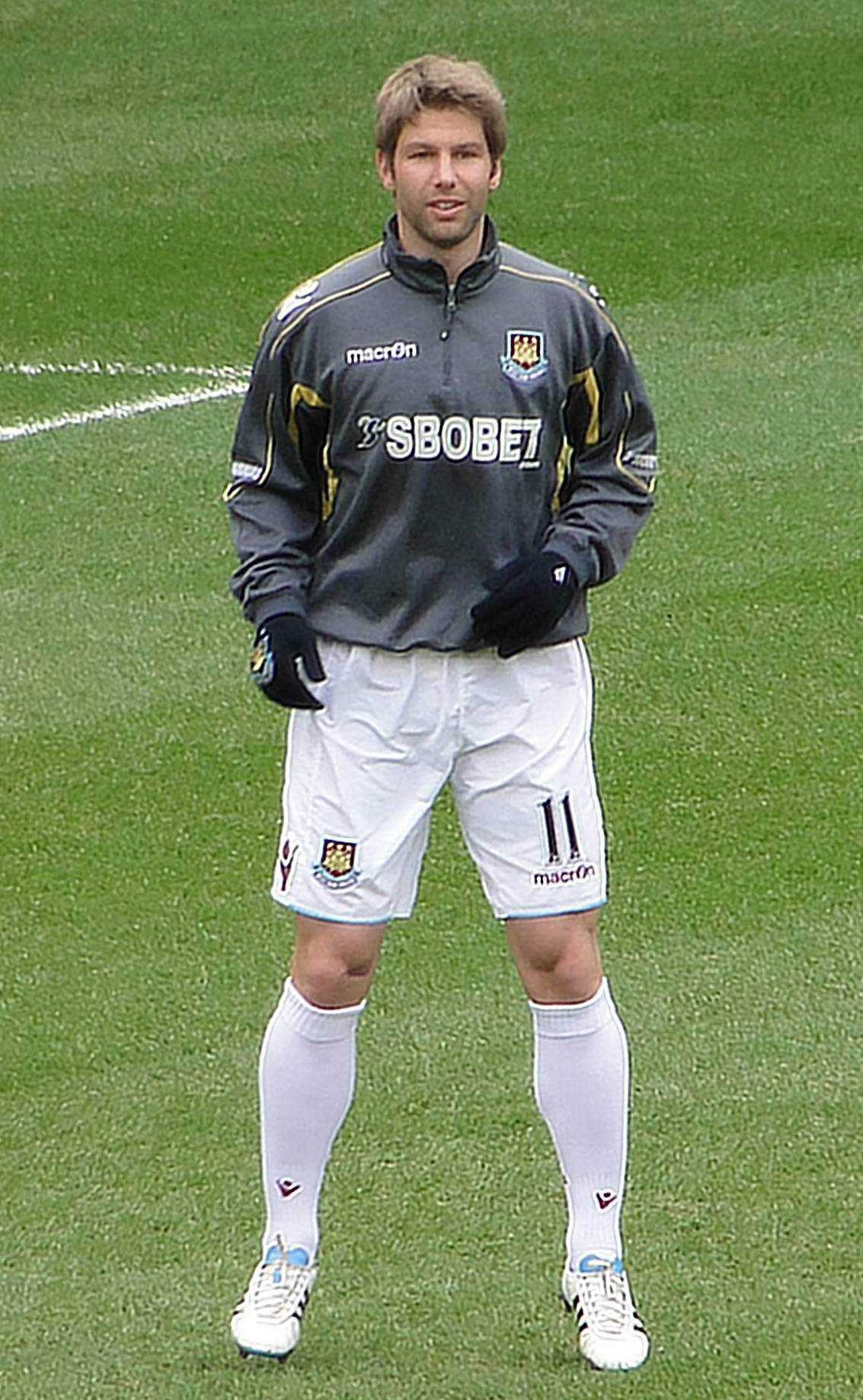
Hitzlsperger with West Ham United in 2011

Hitzlsperger signed a three-year deal with Premier League club West Ham United in June 2010, but due to an injury did not make his debut for the Hammers until an FA Cup fifth round match against Burnley on 21 February 2011, a game in which he scored in the 23rd minute of a 5–1 win with a "trademark thunderbolt" from 25 yards. Hitzlsperger made his league debut for the East London club six days later in a 3–1 win against Liverpool at the Boleyn Ground. He scored his first league goal for West Ham in the 3–0 home win against Stoke City on 5 March. At the end of the season West Ham were relegated to the Football League Championship and Hitzlsperger's contract was terminated.

=== Wolfsburg ===
On 17 August 2011, Hitzlsperger signed for Bundesliga club Wolfsburg on a three-year deal, after being released by West Ham three months earlier. His contract was terminated at the end of the season. He played for Stuttgart and Wolfsburg 131 matches in the Bundesliga and scored 20 goals in the German top flight.

=== Everton ===
On 19 October 2012, Hitzlsperger joined Premier League club Everton, after a spell on trial with the club, on a short-term contract until January 2013. He made his debut for the Toffees coming on as an 86th-minute substitute for Nikica Jelavić in a 2–1 victory against Sunderland at Goodison Park. He made his first Everton start away to Reading on 17 November. On 11 January 2013 he signed an extension to his contract, keeping him at the club until the end of the season. At the end of the season, he was released along with Ján Mucha.

In September 2013, aged 31, Hitzlsperger announced his retirement from football citing the strain of "many transfers and some injuries". Although he had received offers to resume his playing career, he reported, "I've noticed: I need something else."

== International career ==
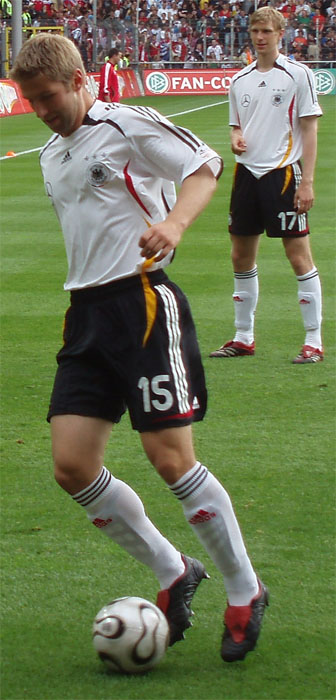
Hitzlsperger playing for the Germany national team

Hitzlsperger captained the Germany under-19 team, and also appeared for the national under-21 side. He was then called up to the senior side by Jürgen Klinsmann and made his debut in a 2–0 win against Iran in Tehran on 9 October 2004, replacing Bernd Schneider in the 68th minute.

He appeared at the 2005 Confederations Cup and also at the 2006 World Cup, where he failed to make it into Klinsmann's starting eleven, playing just 11 minutes in the third-place play-off against Portugal. He scored his first international goals on 6 September 2006 in a European Championship qualifying game against San Marino. Hitzlsperger came on as a second-half substitute to score Germany's 9th and 11th goals in a record 13–0 win.

Germany's coach Joachim Löw included Hitzlsperger in his squad for the 2008 Euros, but did not start him in any of the three group games. Hitzlsperger came on as a second-half substitute in the victories over Poland and Austria, but did not feature at all in the surprise defeat to Croatia. In the knockout stages however, he started in all three matches, helping his team to defeat Portugal in the quarter-final and setting up Philipp Lahm for a 90th-minute winner against Turkey in the semi-final. Germany were defeated 1–0 by Spain in the final, in which Hitzlsperger was substituted in the second half.

Hitzlsperger remained first-choice in 2010 World Cup qualifying, playing in all but one match and scoring a goal, but he missed out on his nation's World Cup squad in June 2010. His international career ended on 11 August 2010 with his 52nd cap.

== Executive career ==
On 12 February 2019, Hitzlsperger became Head of Sport of VfB Stuttgart. He was promoted to CEO and resigned in January 2022 to return to his television career.

In January 2025, after the acquisition of Hellas Verona by American private equity firm Presidio Investors, he was announced as a board member of the club.

== Personal life ==
Hitzlsperger, the youngest child of Ludwig and Anneliese Hitzlsperger, was born in Munich and grew up in Forstinning, alongside his five brothers and one sister. Hitzlsperger has an interest in economics, and while in England studied investment strategies, although he did not complete the course. He regularly visited the Bank of England to discuss finance with the bank's governor, Mervyn King, a lifelong Aston Villa fan.

In June 2007, Hitzlsperger ended his eight-year relationship with his longtime girlfriend, Inga, just one month before they were due to get married.

Hitzlsperger has blogged for Störungsmelder, an anti-racism site that encourages debate about xenophobia and racism in Germany.

=== Coming out ===
On 8 January 2014, a few months after retiring, he became the highest-profile male footballer to come out as gay at the time. Hitzlsperger said that he had only realised that he was gay in the past few years. He received widespread support from former fellow players of the Germany national team, such as Lukas Podolski, who said of his coming out as "brave" and "an important sign of our time" as well as a reaction from Joachim Löw who said of his decision as "personal" and that he "deserved respect from every side." In January 2022, Hitzlsperger told ARD, that a "collective coming out" of gay footballers could be a solution to their problems of hiding their sexuality. Hitzlsperger took the example of 125 Catholic priests in Germany who decided to come out at once. In January 2024, Hitzlsperger was named by Aston Villa as a member of the Honorary Anniversary Board ahead of the club's 150th anniversary season. In March 2024, Hitzlsperger presented Mutproben, his autobiography, where he speaks about his coming-out and LGBTQ+ activism.

== Career statistics ==
=== Club ===
Appearances and goals by club, season and competition
Club	Season	League			National cup (Note: Appearances in the FA Cup and DFB-Pokal)		League cup (Note: Appearances in the English League Cup and German League Cup)		Continental		Other		Total		Ref.
Club	Season	Division	Apps	Goals	Apps	Goals	Apps	Goals	Apps	Goals	Apps	Goals	Apps	Goals	Ref.
Aston Villa	2000–01	Premier League	1	0	0	0	0	0	—		—		1	0	
Aston Villa	2001–02	Premier League	12	1	0	0	0	0	—		—		12	1	
Aston Villa	2002–03	Premier League	26	2	0	0	3	2	4 (Note: Appearances in the UEFA Intertoto Cup)	0	—		33	4	
Aston Villa	2003–04	Premier League	32	3	1	0	5	2	—		—		38	5	
Aston Villa	2004–05	Premier League	28	2	0	0	2	0	—		—		30	2	
Aston Villa	Total		99	8	1	0	10	4	4	0	—		114	12	—
Chesterfield (loan)	2001–02	Second Division	5	0	0	0	0	0	—		1 (Note: Appearance in the Football League Trophy)	0	6	0	
VfB Stuttgart	2005–06	Bundesliga	26	2	2	1	3	1	7 (Note: Appearances in the UEFA Cup)	0	—		38	4	
VfB Stuttgart	2006–07	Bundesliga	30	7	5	3	—		—		—		35	10	
VfB Stuttgart	2007–08	Bundesliga	25	5	4	2	1	0	2 (Note: Appearances in the UEFA Champions League)	0	—		30	7	
VfB Stuttgart	2008–09	Bundesliga	32	5	3	0	—		10	2	—		45	7	
VfB Stuttgart	2009–10	Bundesliga	12	1	3	1	—		7	0	—		22	2	
VfB Stuttgart	Total		125	20	17	7	4	1	26	2	—		172	30	—
Lazio	2009–10	Serie A	6	1	0	0	—		—		—		6	1	
West Ham United	2010–11	Premier League	11	2	2	1	0	0	—		—		13	3	
VfL Wolfsburg	2011–12	Bundesliga	6	0	0	0	—		—		—		6	0	
Everton	2012–13	Premier League	7	0	2	0	0	0	—		—		9	0	
Career total			259	31	22	8	14	5	30	2	1	0	326	46	—

=== International ===
Appearances and goals by national team and year
National team	Year	Apps	Goals
Germany	2004	2	0
Germany	2005	11	0
Germany	2006	7	2
Germany	2007	10	2
Germany	2008	13	2
Germany	2009	8	0
Germany	2010	1	0
Total		52	6

Scores and results list Germany's goal tally first, score column indicates score after each Hitzlsperger goal.

List of international goals scored by Thomas Hitzlsperger
No.	Date	Venue	Opponent	Score	Result	Competition
1	6 September 2006	Stadio Olimpico, Serravalle, San Marino	San Marino	9–0	13–0	UEFA Euro 2008 qualifying
2	6 September 2006	Stadio Olimpico, Serravalle, San Marino	San Marino	11–0	13–0	UEFA Euro 2008 qualifying
3	6 June 2007	AOL Arena, Hamburg, Germany	Slovakia	2–1	2–1	UEFA Euro 2008 qualifying
4	17 November 2007	Allianz Arena, Munich, Germany	Cyprus	4–0	4–0	UEFA Euro 2008 qualifying
5	6 February 2008	Ernst-Happel-Stadion, Vienna, Austria	Austria	1–0	3–0	Friendly
6	6 September 2008	Rheinpark Stadion, Vaduz, Liechtenstein	Liechtenstein	5–0	6–0	2010 FIFA World Cup qualifying

== Honours ==
VfB Stuttgart

- Bundesliga: 2006–07
- DFB-Pokal runner-up: 2006–07

Germany

- UEFA European Championship runner-up: 2008
- FIFA World Cup third place: 2006
- FIFA Confederations Cup third place: 2005

Individual

- kicker Bundesliga Team of the Season: 2006–07
- Federal Cross of Merit (2020)

== See also ==
- LGBTQ people in association football
