= Vikash Dhorasoo =

French footballer (born 1973)

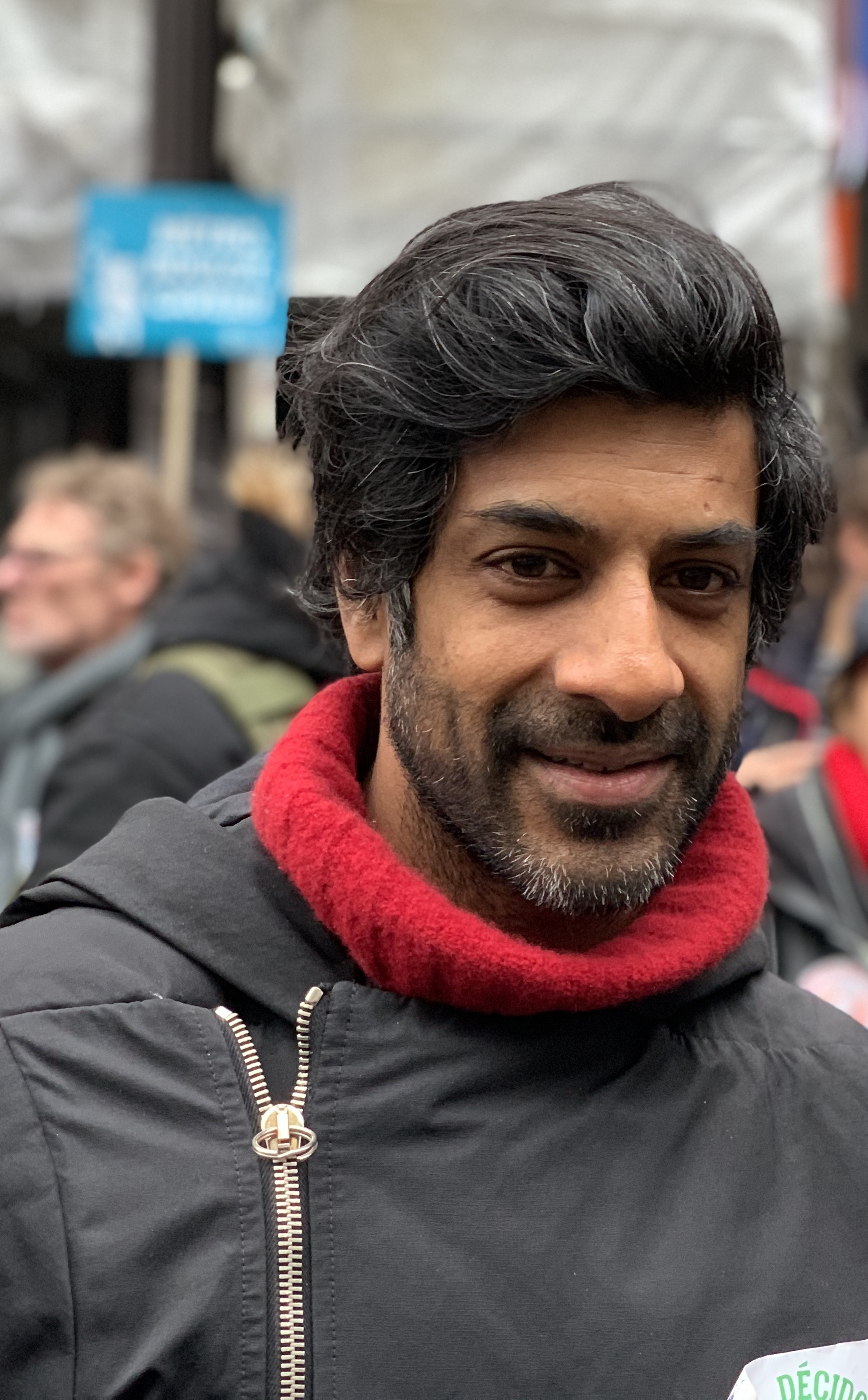
- Dhorasoo in 2020

Personal information
- Full name: Vikash Rao Dhorasoo
- Date of birth: 10 October 1973 (age 53)
- Place of birth: Harfleur, Seine-Maritime, France
- Height: 1.68 m (5 ft 6 in)
- Position: Central midfielder

Youth career
- 1980-1983: Le Havre Caucriauville Sportif
- 1983-1993: Le Havre

Senior career*
Years	Team	Apps	(Gls)
1993–1998	Le Havre	137	(4)
1998–2004	Lyon	161	(11)
2001–2002	→ Bordeaux (loan)	28	(1)
2004–2005	AC Milan	12	(0)
2005–2006	Paris Saint-Germain	37	(0)
2007	Livorno	0	(0)
Total		375	(16)

International career
1994–1996	France U21	12	(2)
1996	France Olympic	4	(0)
1999–2006	France	18	(1)
Medal record
Men's football
Representing France
FIFA World Cup
Runner-up	2006 Germany
UEFA European Under-21 Championship
Third place	1996 Spain
Toulon Tournament
Runner-up	1995 France
World Military Cup
Winner	Rome 1995
- * Club domestic league appearances and goals

Vikash Rao Dhorasoo (Telugu: [ʋikaːʃ ɾaːʋ d̪ʰoɾɐsuː], born 10 October 1973) is a French former professional footballer who played as a midfielder.

Dhorasoo spent most of his career with Lyon, winning Ligue 1 twice in 2003 and 2004, and also had a loan at Bordeaux and a spell at Paris Saint-Germain, who dismissed him in October 2006. Abroad, he had one year at Italy's AC Milan where he reached the 2005 UEFA Champions League Final, and a spell at Livorno where he did not play.

Internationally, Dhorasoo earned 18 caps and scored once for France from 1999 to 2006. He was part of their team that came runners-up at the 2006 FIFA World Cup.

== Club career ==
=== Early career ===
Born in Harfleur, Seine-Maritime, Dhorasoo began his football career with Le Havre AC, where he made his debut in a 0–0 draw with AS Saint-Etienne in August 1993. After five years at Le Havre, he went on to play for Olympique Lyonnais in 1998.

He had a brief spell at league rivals FC Girondins de Bordeaux from 2001 to 2002. He won two French Ligue 1 championships with Lyon in 2003 and 2004.

In April 2004, Dhorasoo agreed to move abroad to play for Italian club AC Milan, on a two-year deal. He was an unused substitute in the 2005 UEFA Champions League Final, when Liverpool beat A.C. Milan on penalties, but won a runners-up medal.

=== Paris Saint-Germain ===
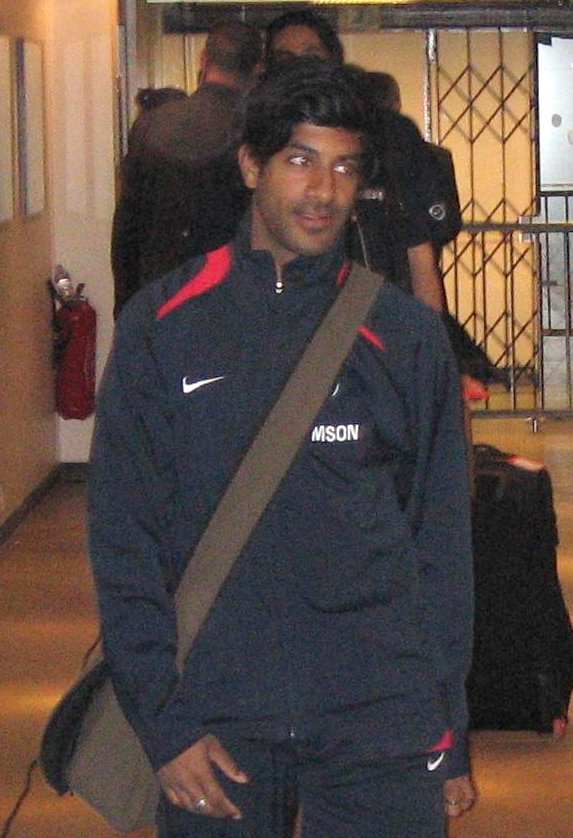
Dhorasoo with Paris Saint-Germain in 2006

Dhorasoo moved back to France in 2005, signing for Paris Saint-Germain (PSG). He was part of the PSG squad that won the 2006 Coupe de France, as he scored a 25-yard shot in the final and secured the victory against fierce rivals Marseille.

In September 2006, he criticised manager Guy Lacombe in an interview with L'Equipe, and a month later his contract with PSG was terminated, being the first player to be sacked from a French club since the Professional Footballers Charter was set up in 1973. The reasons listed for dismissal were "His refusal to play for the reserves, his lack of loyalty, also his insubordination, disobedience and his permanent air of provocation".

=== Livorno ===
On 3 July 2007, Livorno announced to have signed Dhorasoo with a statement on their official website. However, Livorno rescinded his contract in October of the same year due to differences with the club, before having played. According to club president Aldo Spinelli, he refused to play a game for them.

== International career ==
These [fans] who come to the stadium hissing and hating me, I defend them because they are the masses, people who came from tough estates just like me.

— Dhorasoo on falling out of favour playing for France.

While at Lyon, Dhorasoo made his debut for the France national team in a goalless draw against Ukraine on 27 March 1999. He played another national team match in June 1999, before his national team career went into a five-year hiatus.

Dhorasoo was called up for the France national team for the 2006 FIFA World Cup qualification in September 2004, and he represented the country at the 2006 FIFA World Cup in Germany. After the World Cup, Dhorasoo publicly revealed the time spent in the French squad during the month-long tournament, through a documentary titled Substitute, much to the anger of France national team manager Raymond Domenech and the French Football Federation. Dhorasoo was warned against publishing the documentary. He retired from the France national team, saying "I am not interested in playing for Les Bleus any more. It's over."

Dhorasoo made 18 national team appearances between 1999 and 2006, scoring a single goal in a 4–0 home win over Cyprus on 12 October 2005, ensuring a place at the 2006 World Cup.

== Post-football career ==
As of 2023, Dhorasoo was a football consultant for the French sports channel L’Equipe. In 2008 he acted in the film La très très grande entreprise. He authored four books; Substitute, Comme Ses Pieds, L’Engagement – explique a ma fille et ses potes du quartier and the 2020 graphic novel J’perds pas la boule, illustrated by Emilie Gleason. He ran in the 2020 Paris municipal election.

== Coaching career ==
In July 2009, he became chairman of French football club L'Entente SSG.

== Personal life ==
Dhorasoo is an Indo-Frenchman of Indo-Mauritian origins. His ancestors were Telugu from Vizianagaram, India who migrated to Mauritius in the 19th century.

After his dismissal from PSG in 2006, Dhorasoo became a professional poker player for Winamax. He stopped playing professionally in September 2011 after a defeat at the Partouche Poker Tour in Cannes. He earned $527,453 in his poker career, and was ranked 142nd on France's all-time winners in November 2020.

Dhorasoo's favourite music group is Belle and Sebastian and his favourite author is Jonathan Coe.

Dhorasoo is married and father of two daughters, born in 2003 and 2005.

He has spoken against discrimination and in 2003 he started actively supporting Paris Foot Gay, a football club which combats homophobia and other discrimination in the sport.

== Career statistics ==
Score and result list France's goal tally first, score column indicates score after Dhorasoo goal.

International goal scored by Vikash Dhorasoo
No.	Date	Venue	Opponent	Score	Result	Competition
1	12 October 2005	Stade de France, Saint-Denis, France	Cyprus	3–0	4–0	2006 FIFA World Cup qualification

== Honours ==
Lyon

- Ligue 1: 2002–03, 2003–04
- Coupe de la Ligue: 2000–01
- Trophée des Champions: 2002, 2003

Bordeaux

- Coupe de la Ligue: 2001–02

AC Milan

- Supercoppa Italiana: 2004
- UEFA Champions League runner-up: 2004–05

Paris Saint-Germain

- Coupe de France: 2005–06

France

- FIFA World Cup runner-up: 2006
- World Military Cup: 1995

Individual

- Toulon Tournament Best Player: 1995
- Étoile d'Or: 1998, 2004
- British Asian Sports Awards Lifetime Achievement Award: 2008
- Paris Municipal Election Candidate: 2020
