= Thomas Berling =

Norwegian footballer (born 1979)

Personal information
- Date of birth: 21 February 1979 (age 47)
- Place of birth: Drevja, Norway
- Height: 1.79 m (5 ft 10 in)
- Position: Defender

Youth career
- Nardo
- Lyn

Senior career*
| Years | Team | Apps | (Gls) |
| 1999–2000 | Lyn 2 | | |
| 1999 | Lyn | 3 | (0) |
| 2001–2002 | Drøbak/Frogn | | |

International career
| 1998 | Norway U19 | 2 | (0) |
- * Club domestic league appearances and goals

Thomas Berling (born 21 January 1979) is a Norwegian former professional footballer who played as a defender. His retirement from football sparked media attention.

He hails from Drevja. He played for Nardo FK, and joined Lyn ahead of the 1999 season. He played three games in the second highest Norwegian league, and also played for the under-19 national team.

In 2000, he disappeared from professional football. It later surfaced that he had come out as gay, and that he quit football as a result of what he described as widespread homophobia in the football community. In 2001, he briefly came out of retirement, playing for lower league Drøbak/Frogn IF.

Berling's case was cited several times in the upcoming years, as the connection between homophobia and sport was discussed in the national media now and then.

== See also ==
- Athlete Ally
- Homosexuality in sports
- Principle 6 campaign
