= Mutproben =

2024 autobiography by Thomas Hitzlsperger

- Book cover release
- Authors: Thomas Hitzlsperger; Holger Gertz
- Language: German
- Subjects: Homosexuality in association football
- Publisher: Kiepenheuer & Witsch
- Publication date: 7 March 2024
- Publication place: Germany
- Pages: 224
- ISBN: 978-346-200-528-8

Mutproben (German: Tests of Courage) is a 2024 autobiography written by retired German football player Thomas Hitzlsperger and journalist Holger Gertz.

Hitzlsperger, who came out as gay after ending his player career, tells his story about coming out to peers, his experiences as a young player, and dealing with homophobia and double morals in professional football.

== Background ==
Hitzlsperger was part of the German national football team between 2004 and 2010, where he reached his most important appearance with the national team by playing in a game against Portugal for the third-place match of the 2006 FIFA World Cup. In club teams, Hitzlsperger had an extensive career with English club Aston Villa F.C., from where he retired in 2005 after playing there for five years. In England, Hitzlsperger became a fan's favourite and was dubbed The Hammer for his powerful long-range shots.

The last club for Hitzlsperger was Everton F.C., leaving the club in January 2013, and finally retiring from football in September of that year, following a series of injuries.

In January 2014, Hitlzsperger came out as a gay man, saying that it took him a "long time" but that he "realised that (I) do want to live with a man." His coming out was met with support from sports and political figures, including German government official Steffen Seibert, who sent a supportive message from Chancellor Angela Merkel, as well as British Prime Minister David Cameron, who posted on Twitter that he admired Hitzlsperger "even more now." He received other encouraging messages from players like Lukas Podolski and Marcus Rashford, among others, as well as from German football authorities like Reinhard Rauball, Theo Zwanziger, and his childhood club Bayern Munich, which called Hitzlsperger's decision "brave."

== Contents ==
In his autobiography, Hitzlsperger chronicles his career and personal life, combining his beginnings in children's football with anecdotes and experiences in high-stakes football. Hitzlsperger wrote about his times with VfB Stuttgart, where he was used to being on the bench and how he skipped training with Bayern to play for Aston Villa, subsequently joining the English club despite the strong criticism he faced from the then-president of Bayern Uli Hoeneß.

About his homosexuality and career, Hitzlsperger includes anecdotes from his times at West Ham United F.C. in England, recalling that a homophobic remark made by one of his teammates in the dressing room made him decide to continue hiding his sexual orientation. That teammate sarcastically asked if the others imagined what would be like to have a gay player in the dressing room, to which another of Hitzlsperger's teammates angrily replied: "And what would be the fucking problem if there was one?" He also appeals throughout the entire book for football players and clubs to make a clear stance on social issues. Writing about past regrets, Hitzlsperger cites his time at SS Lazio as an example of decisions made without considering personal values. He ultimately left Lazio in rejection of the club's far-right and fascist hooligans.

Hitzlsperger also narrates his frustrations at the way that some footballers deal with politics, citing "double morals" from a club promoting rainbow flags on the corners of the pitch but signing a contract with a player who posted homophobic comments on Instagram. About his activism, Hitzlsperger relates how disappointed he felt at former Liverpool F.C. captain Jordan Henderson and his decision to move to a Saudi Arabian football club, where homosexuality is illegal under death penalty provisions, reminding Henderson's friendly words to a teenage fan in December 2020 who had expressed conflict between his passion for Liverpool and being gay. Hitzlsperger also criticised David Beckham for agreeing to work for tourism for Qatar, saying that people like Henderson and Beckham "support gay rights when it's good for them." Henderson had previously apologised to the gay community in September 2023, saying that it "hurt him" that some fans were urging gay men to turn their backs on him. He said that playing in Saudi Arabia has not changed his mind about the issue of gay rights and considered the flexibilities by Qatar at the World Cup as a positive sign that things could change in the future for the LGBTQ+ community in that country. In the book, Hitzlsperger says that he does not criticise Cristiano Ronaldo's decision to play in the Saudi league, basing his position on Ronaldo never speaking out about gay issues, contrary to Henderson and Beckham.

On social positions regarding the current state of Germany, Hitzlsperger advocates that sexual diversity issues be spoken about at schools to promote tolerance and acceptance since adolescence.

A strong opponent of the 2022 FIFA World Cup in Qatar, Hitzlsperger tells how he turned down the offer to be a commentator on the field, adding further criticism of FIFA and prominent foreign investors. Hitzlsperger opposes football business by actors from nations that are hostile to the gay community, who Hitzlsperger says go to Europe and monetise on European clubs; a position he had previously stated in 2023.

== Critical reception ==
The book received largely positive reviews from critics, including Günter Klein of the Frankfurter Rundschau and Julian Seiler of the Frankfurter Allgemeine Zeitung and the Süddeutsche Zeitung, as well as Alexander Solloch of Norddeutscher Rundfunk. Maximilian Rieger, writing for Deutschlandfunk Kultur, gave a positive review for the book, praising co-author Holger Gertz and his journalistic works in the LGBTQ+ field. Marie Samstag of Austrian sports website Abseits said that the book is "not bad" but does not show anything innovative.

== Cited works ==
- Hitzlsperger, Thomas (2024). Mutproben (in German). Germany: Kiepenheuer & Witsch. ISBN 978-346-200-528-8.
