= Ouissem Belgacem =

French-Tunisian football player and writer (born 1988)

- وسام بالقاسم
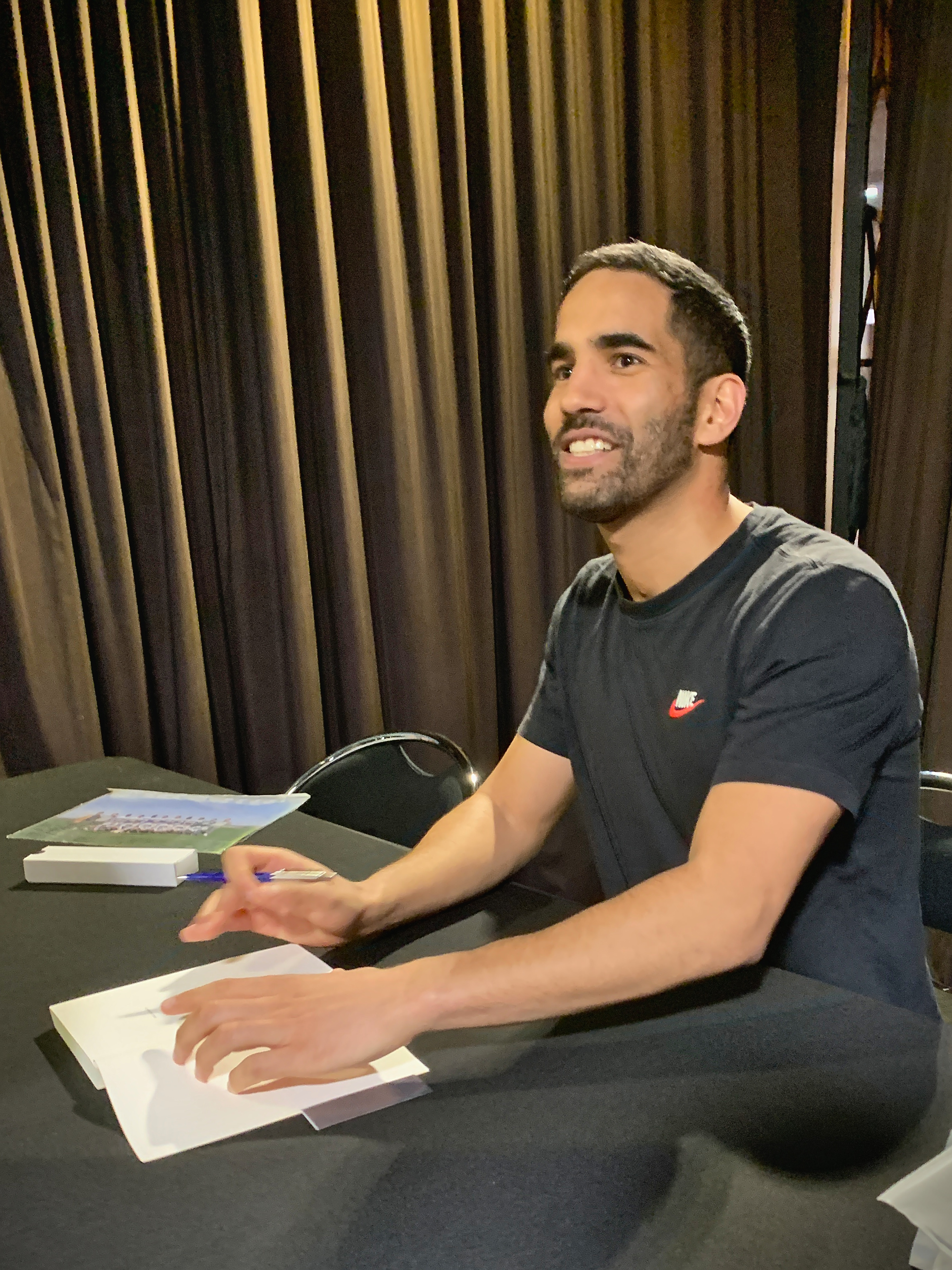
- Belgacem in 2022
- Born: 16 January 1988 (age 38); Aix-en-Provence, France
- Occupations: Former football player, writer, entrepreneur
- Notable work: Adieu ma honte

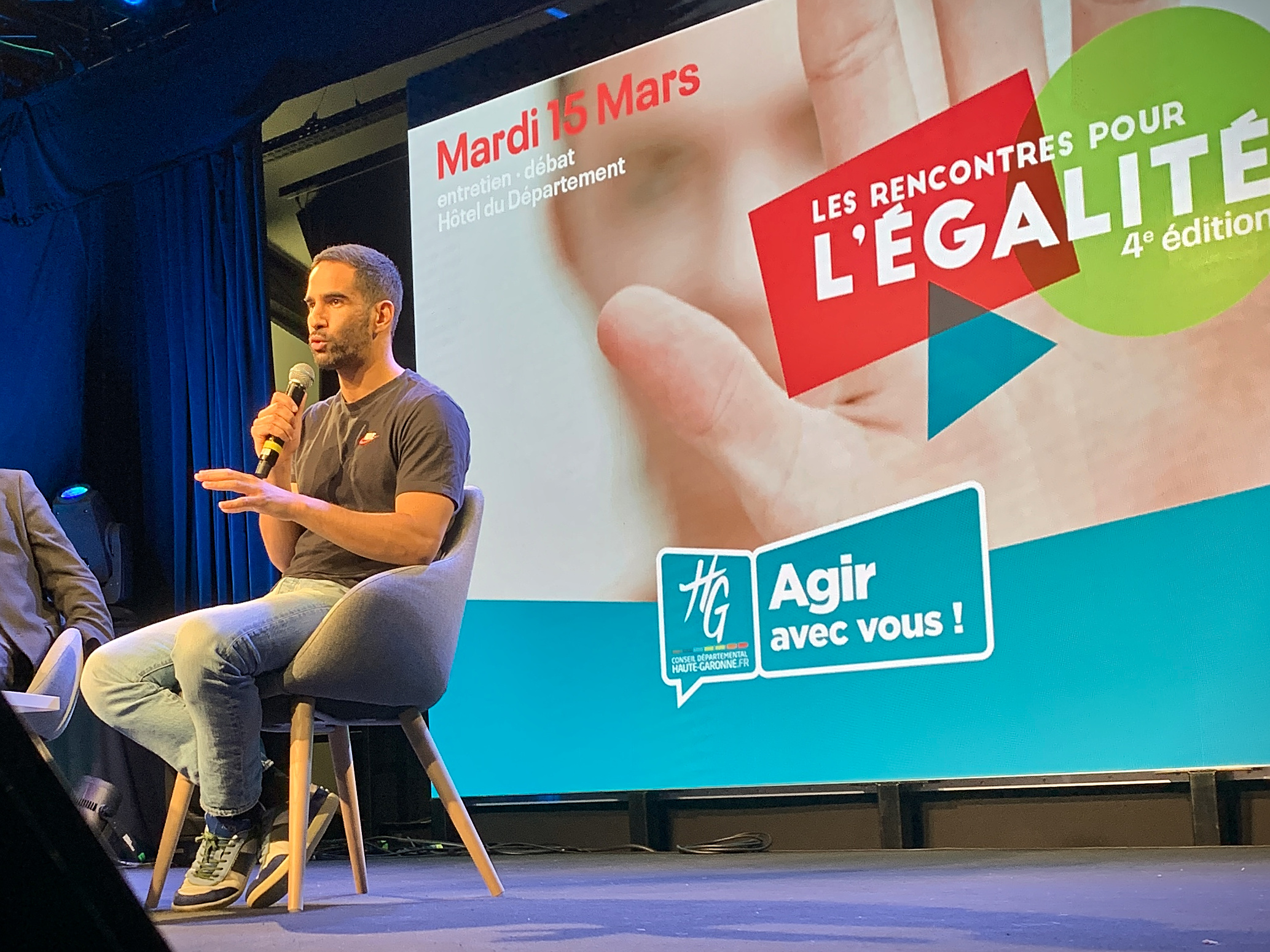
Ouissem Belgacem during the anti-LGBTphobia evening, as part of the Rencontres de l'Égalité 2022

Ouissem Belgacem (Arabic: وسام بالقاسم; born 16 January 1988) is a French former high-performance athlete and writer of Tunisian origin. He played football for Toulouse FC from the ages of 13 to 18 years old. He published his first autobiographical novel, Adieu ma honte, in 2021. Belgacem often raises awareness about homophobia in the field of football, which he had to leave to live his sexuality freely.

== Early life ==
Belgacem was born in 1988 in the suburbs of Aix-en-Provence in France. In his family of Tunisian origin, he is the youngest, with four older sisters. He was seduced by football and started playing as a defender in local clubs before he was spotted at 13 years old by the training center Toulouse FC (TFC). Since Belgacem joined TFC, he worked towards becoming a professional football player while hiding his homosexuality as he realized that the field would not accept it. He also felt this homophobia when he played in the Tunisian national team for the Africa Cup of Nations of 2004 and some clubs in the United States:

Every day, I would leave my bedroom, put on a mask, and act as a straight man. It's exhausting to do this every day. — Ouissem Belgacem

Hence, he grew up being ashamed and making sure to hide his homosexuality which made him depressed and pushed him to abandon his dream of becoming a professional athlete.

== Career after football ==
Belgacem then moved to London where he does not feel shame about his sexuality anymore. Now openly gay, he published his autobiography, Adieu ma honte, in 2021 to spark conversations about homophobia in the field of sports. In this first novel, Belgacem reveals the hardships of accepting one's homosexuality when living in a working-class neighborhood, growing up in a Muslim family, and making progress in the field of football. He has given interventions in numerous awareness raising events against homophobia in football since the release of his book; including events with the players of TFC, the players of Amiens SC, and the members of the equality club in the Lycée intercommunal Darius-Milhaud in Kremlin-Bicêtre.

Belgacem is also the owner of the company OnTrack Sport which supports high performance athletes in the management of their after-careers.

== Awards ==
- Narrative autobiography award, at the Prix du roman gay 2021.

== Works ==
- Ouissem Belgacem and Eléonore Gurrey, Adieu ma honte, Paris, Fayard, 2021.
