= OneLove =

Anti-discrimination campaign

- Design of the OneLove armband
- Date: 2020–present
- Location: International, primarily Europe
- Also known as: OneLove armband, #OneLove, Pride armband, multicoloured armband, rainbow captain's armband
- Cause: Anti-discrimination, human rights, anti-racism, LGBT+ rights

OneLove is an anti-discrimination, anti-racism, LGBT+ rights and human rights campaign, started during the 2020 football season by the Dutch Football Association, that invites football players to wear armbands with the rainbow-coloured OneLove logo. Attracting controversy when worn in nations that have homophobic or anti-LGBT+ laws, it became prominent during the men's 2022 FIFA World Cup.

== History ==
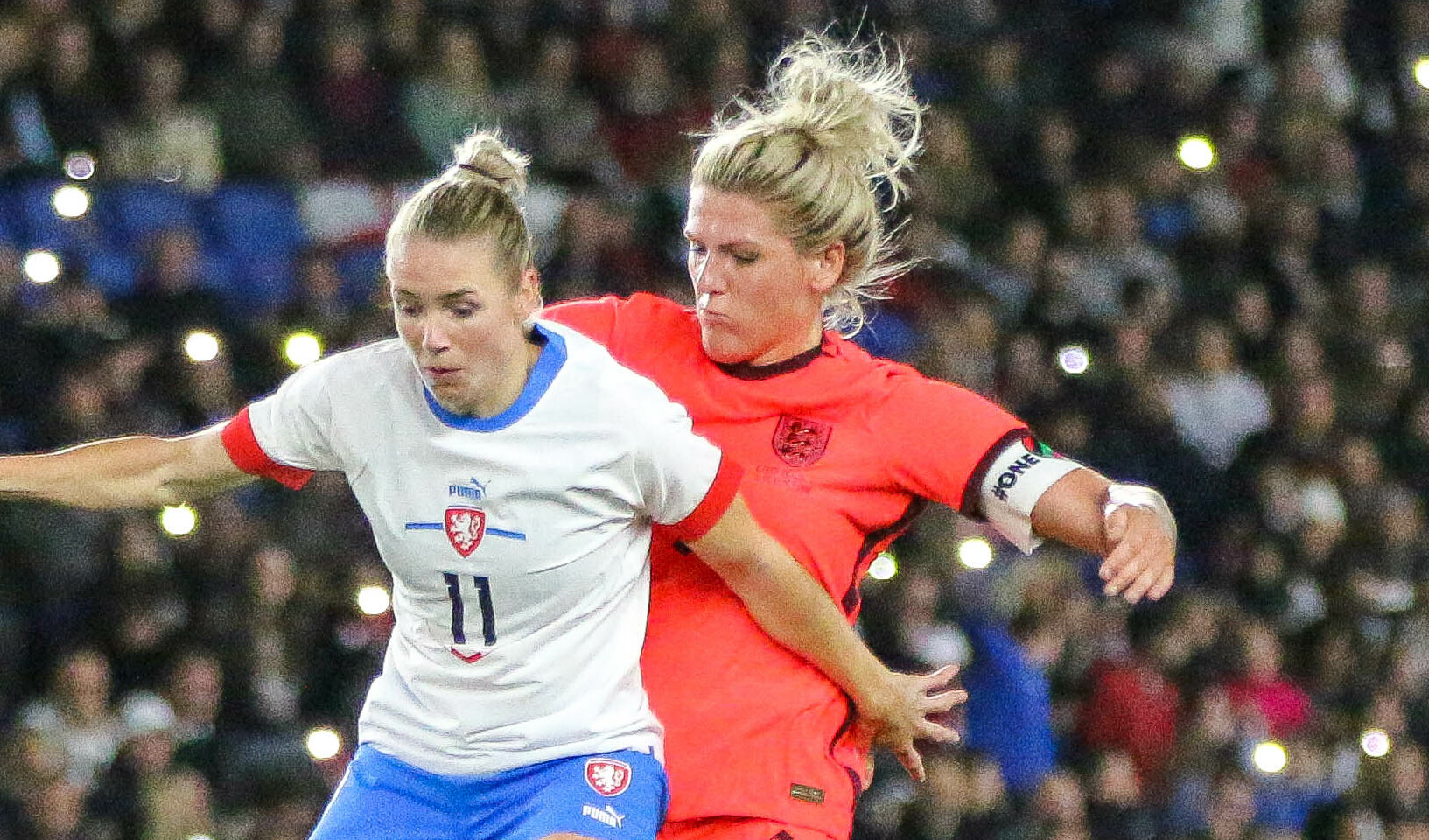
England women's vice-captain Millie Bright (right) wearing the armband during a friendly against the Czech Republic in England in October 2022

The OneLove campaign kicked off in the Netherlands at the start of the 2020 football season, largely in response to racism in Dutch football, with an open letter rejecting any form of discrimination. The letter emphasised that, internationally, football unites millions of people from all parts of society. That message was shown on billboards in football stadiums where the Netherlands national team played their games. The OneLove logo was also worn on team jerseys during the KNVB Cup Final between Ajax and PSV. The campaign then spread its advertising to print and video media. Netherlands captain Georginio Wijnaldum wore the OneLove armband during UEFA Men's Euro 2020. In June 2021, another open letter was published, this time saying that the fans were proud of their teams for the OneLove campaign.

At the UEFA Women's Euro 2022, most captains wore either a OneLove or Stonewall rainbow armband, including winning England captain Leah Williamson, Sweden captain Kosovare Asllani, and Norway captain Ada Hegerberg, who was also wearing it to honour the victims of the 2022 Oslo shooting.

The OneLove campaign's impact in the Netherlands saw it spread to other European countries, with ten national men's teams (Belgium, Denmark, England, France, Germany, the Netherlands, Norway, Sweden, Switzerland and Wales) agreeing to wear the armband for all their UEFA Nations League and FIFA World Cup matches, beginning in September 2022. Two of those nations did not qualify for the 2022 FIFA World Cup, and England did not wear the armband while in official mourning of Elizabeth II.

In December 2022, during the 2022 World Cup, Dutch music artists Yellow Pearl and Noah Jaora collaborated on a single titled "OneLove", having consulted with the Dutch Football Association. The single was released to support the campaign.

The England women's team continued to wear the OneLove armband in 2023, also in recognition of Czech men's player Jakub Jankto coming out while an active international, with Williamson saying that she wished to continue wearing it at the 2023 FIFA Women's World Cup and that if there was a decision about it, "you hope it's not a last-minute call once [teams] get there". Shortly afterwards, FIFA president Gianni Infantino announced that they "are looking for a dialogue and we will have a solution in place well before the Women's World Cup." In the weeks before the tournament, FIFA upheld its ban of the OneLove armband, though it revealed its own similar design, with the same colours in a heart, as an option.

In March 2023, Dutch player Redouan El Yaakoubi chose to step away from captaining Excelsior Rotterdam so that he did not have to publicly support the campaign.

== Armband design ==
The armband features a heart with multicoloured stripes and a numeral "1". The words "#ONE" and "LOVE" are on either side of the heart. The colours in the logo are not those of the rainbow or LGBT pride flag; instead, they symbolise "race and heritage (red/black/green) and all gender identities and sexual orientations (pink/yellow/blue)". The choices for the colour combinations were inspired by the Pan-African flag and the pansexual flag respectively.

The Pan-African flag

The pansexual flag

== Controversies ==
=== UEFA Men's Euro 2020 ===
Rejection of the armband was first seen in 2021, when Wijnaldum wore it in a Men's Euro 2020 match against the Czech Republic that was held in Budapest, Hungary. The Hungarian government had shortly before passed a law that banned mentions of homosexuality and transgender issues in education. Dutch fans had also been stopped from taking rainbow flags into the stadium fan zone; UEFA said that any restrictions were made by local security and that it welcomed rainbow Pride symbols, adding that it had informed the Hungarian Football Federation that "rainbow-colored symbols are not political and in line with UEFA's #EqualGame campaign, which fights against all discrimination, including against the LGBTQI+ community, such flags will be allowed into the stadium."

=== 2022 Men's FIFA World Cup ===
European players who had previously worn rainbow armbands informed FIFA of their intention to continue with the gesture at the 2022 Men's FIFA World Cup, held in Qatar. Their plan to do so gained widespread attention in the days before the start of the tournament, due to increasing criticisms of Qatar's attitude towards homosexuality.

After having arrived at the tournament, the relevant associations were warned that players would be at minimum booked for wearing rainbow armbands, rather than just receive the expected fine; a joint statement by England, Wales, Belgium, Denmark, Germany, Switzerland and the Netherlands confirmed they would not wear the armband as doing so would affect players. With the decision from FIFA coming so late — despite having already established protocol on such equipment used under their auspices — as well as them "silencing anti-discrimination work within the game", was criticised.

Instead of the captains, several people associated with national teams wore the armband. Most prominent was queer BBC pundit and former England women's captain Alex Scott, who wore the armband while reporting on the England vs Iran match on 21 November. German interior minister Nancy Faeser attended Germany's first game at the World Cup on 23 November, where she wore the armband. UK sports minister Stuart Andrew, who is gay, wore it while attending the match between England and Wales.

The German Men's team were particularly critical of FIFA's decision to ban the armband. At their first game, the team covered their mouths in protest of being silenced. When the lack of armband caused one of their sponsors to drop out, the German football association replaced the sponsor's logo with the OneLove symbol in their press centre at the World Cup.

== Similar actions ==
In October 2017, Georgian footballer Guram Kashia wore a rainbow-striped captain's armband for Dutch club Vitesse (against Heracles Almelo) in support of LGBT rights, leading to backlash in his country and calls for him to step down from the Georgian Men's national team.

The popularity of the OneLove armband in European football, and though it is not only in support of LGBT+ rights, prompted some captains to also wear a fully rainbow design armband produced by British LGBT+ advocacy group Stonewall, which had promoted its rainbow laces campaign for LGBT+ visibility in sport since 2013.

Germany Men's captain Manuel Neuer wore a rainbow armband inspired by the campaign throughout the Men's Euro 2020 and at a pre-tournament friendly. UEFA initially opened an investigation of Neuer and the German Football Association, suggesting his armband was a breach of political neutrality; the investigation closed with the determination that "the armband has been assessed as a team symbol for diversity and thus for a 'good cause.'" In the Men's Germany match against England at Wembley, after the investigation was dropped, Neuer continued to wear his rainbow armband and the three Lions' captain Harry Kane wore the OneLove armband. The match fell during June, a Pride Month; Kane had worn rainbow armbands on other occasions to no controversy, particularly in the Premier League for Tottenham, during Pride events.

== See also ==
- Show Racism the Red Card
