= List of LGBTQ American football players =

For a more in-depth discussion of the topic go here: Homosexuality in American Football.

This is a list of notable, openly lesbian, gay, bisexual, pansexual, transgender, and queer-identifying athletes associated with American Football, namely the NFL. This includes those who were posthumously outed.

== List of professional players ==
LGBT NFL players
Name	Years active	Play status	Position	Associated teams	Identity
Dave Kopay	1964-1972	△	Running back	49ers, Lions, Redskins, Saints, Packers	Gay
Jerry Smith*	1965-1977	△	Tight End	Washington Redskins	Gay
Ray McDonald	1967-1968	△	Running back	Washington Redskins	Gay
Roy Simmons	1979-1983	△	Guard	Giants, Redskins	Gay
Jeff Rohrer	1982-1989	△	Linebacker	Dallas Cowboys	Gay
Esera Tuaolo	1991-1999	△	Defensive Tackle	Packers, Vikings, Jaguars, Falcons, Panthers	Gay
Kwame Harris	2003-2008	△	Offensive Lineman	49ers, Raiders	Gay
Ryan O'Callaghan	2006-2011	△	Offensive Lineman	Patriots, Chiefs	Gay
Aaron Hernandez*	2010-2013	▲	Tight End	Patriots	Bisexual
Ryan Russell	2015-2017	△	Defensive End	Buccaneers, Cowboys, Bills	Bisexual
Carl Nassib**	2016-2023	△	Defensive Lineman	Browns, Buccaneers, Raiders	Gay
Wade Davis	2000-2003	▲	Wide Receiver	Titans, Seahawks, Redskins	Gay
Dorien Bryant	2008-2008	▲	Wide Receiver	Steelers	Gay
Martin Jenkins	1977-1977	▲	Defensive Back	Seahawks	Gay
Brad Thorson	2011	▲	Offensive Lineman	Cardinals	Gay
Michael Sam†	2014	▲	Defensive End	Rams, Cowboys [CFL Alouettes 2015]‡	Gay
Colton Underwood	2014-2020	▲	Tight End	Chargers, Eagles, Raiders	Gay

*Posthumously revealed to have been gay.

**First active NFL player to come out.

†First openly gay player to be drafted by the NFL (did not make it onto the roster by the start of the playing season).

‡First openly gay man to play in a regular season game in the CFL

△Played in a Regular Season Game

▲Attended Training Camp

LGBT NWFA & FWA Players
Name	Years active	Position	Associated Teams	Identity
Alissa Wykes	2000-?	Running Back	Liberty Belles	Lesbian

== List of collegiate players ==
LGBT NCAA Football Players
Name	Position	College/University	Division	Identity
Conner Mertens*	Placekicker	Willamette University	III	Bisexual
Wyatt Pertuset	Wide receiver	Capital University	III	Gay
Brian Sims	Defensive tackle	Bloomsburg University	II	Gay
Jacob Van Ittersum	Offensive Lineman	Northwood University	II	Bisexual
Mason Darrow	Offensive Lineman	Princeton University	I	Gay
Scott Frantz	Offensive tackle	Kansas State University	I	Gay
Ed Gallagher	Offensive tackle	University of Pittsburgh	I	Gay
Alan Gendreau	Placekicker	Middle Tennessee State University	I	Gay
Bradley Kim	Defensive back	Air Force Academy	I	Gay
Chip Sarafin	Offensive lineman	Arizona State University	I	Gay
Kennedy McDowell	Defensive lineman	Colorado State University	I	Gay

*First active collegiate football player to publicly come out.
