= LGBTQ people in sports in the United States =

The homosexual sports community in the United States has one of the highest levels of acceptance and support in the world and is rapidly growing as of 2020. General public opinion and jurisprudence regarding homosexuality in the United States has become significantly more accepting since the late 1980s; for example, by the early 2020s, an overwhelming majority of Americans approved of the legality of same-sex marriages. However, LGBTQ people have faced increased pushback in the sports world as part of the 2020s anti-LGBTQ movement in the United States, which has particularly impacted transgender people in sports.

In regard to sports in the United States, in 2002 researcher Eric Anderson found "more openly gay runners and swimmers than football and baseball players". He then hypothesized that this occurred because gay men likely abandoned some sports in favor of sports that were more accepting of homosexuality. In 2006, a Sports Illustrated poll of roughly 1,400 professional athletes found that a majority would be willing to accept a gay teammate. As well, professional ice hockey (NHL) athletes seemed to be the most accepting of such teammates as 80% of its players approved of having a gay teammate. However, these polling numbers have not consistently resulted in an actual increase in lesbian, gay, or queer people in professional sports.

== Efforts to increase inclusion ==
Several organizations exist with the purpose of improving sports for LGBTQ people, such as You Can Play.

A common effort to increase acceptance of LGBTQ people among sports teams and their fans is the introduction of Pride Nights. However, these have resulted in many controversies in various sports.

=== Legal cases in the United States ===
The case of Jennifer Harris against Penn State, more specifically their women's basketball coach Rene Portland, was about homosexuality. In 2006, the National Center for Lesbian Rights accused Rene Portland of forcing Jennifer Harris to transfer because of bias against lesbians. The advocacy group claimed that Portland was biased against lesbians for decades, citing a 1986 interview in which she stated that she would not have lesbians in her program. The lawsuit was eventually settled out of court, with Penn State finding Portland in violation of policy. She was fined $10,000 by the university in lieu of a one-game suspension, and warned that another infraction would result in the termination of her employment. Portland resigned from her position as women's head basketball coach in March 2007.

== History ==
=== 1970s ===
In 1971, Jim Morris became the first openly gay IFBB professional bodybuilder. In 1973 he became the first openly gay bodybuilder to win AAU Mr. America overall, most muscular, best arms, and best chest titles.

In 1975, former football player David Kopay was the first professional athlete from a major team sport to come out as gay. After the public strongly denied Kopay's claims of other gay professional athletes, a study published in the Journal of Sex Research in February 1977 found that around 25% of all male college athletes have had gay experiences.

In 1977, the North American Gay Amateur Athletic Alliance was formed for gay softball teams.

=== 1980s ===
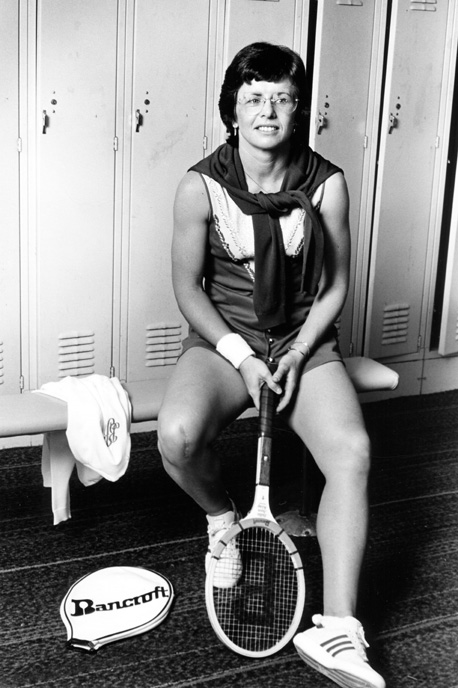
Billie Jean King in 1978 photographed by Lynn Gilbert (1978)

The New York Ramblers began in 1980 when an ad was placed in the Village Voice to gay men who wanted to play soccer as a team called the Rambles.

Tennis player Billie Jean King acknowledged her relationship with Marilyn Barnett when it became public in a May 1981 palimony lawsuit filed by Barnett, making Billie Jean the first prominent female professional athlete in the world to come out.

Glenn Burke was the first Major League Baseball player to come out as gay, announcing it in 1982 after he retired.

In 1985, the Los Angeles Blades was organized as the first gay hockey team in the United States.

In 1986, following the second Gay Games, Tony Jasinski organized the San Francisco Gay Basketball Association.

=== 1990s ===
In 1996, Muffin Spencer-Devlin became the first LPGA player to come out as gay.

Rudy Galindo won the men's title at the 1996 United States Figure Skating Championships. He was the first openly gay U.S. figure skating champion.

In 1998, at Oberlin College, former Northwestern and Auburn track coach Michael Muska became the first openly gay college athletics director.

Also in 1998, the Washington Renegades RFC was formed as the first gay rugby team in the United States.

In 1999, the New York City Gay Hockey Association was organized.

Also in 1999, Carol Blazejowski, general manager of the New York Liberty, came out as a lesbian and became the first general manager in the WNBA to do so.

=== 2000s ===
In 2002, Sue Wicks came out as gay, making her the first openly gay person playing in the WNBA.

Also in 2002, the National Gay Flag Football League was founded by Jim Buzinski and Cyd Zeigler.

In 2003, Stephen Rhodes became the first openly gay NASCAR driver.

Kirk Walker came out as gay to the Oregon State Beavers softball team while he was their head coach in 2005, and while still the head coach came out to the website Outsports in 2007. He was the first openly gay male coach in NCAA Division I history.

In 2006, a gay rights advocacy group, the National Center for Lesbian Rights, accused Rene Portland of forcing player Jennifer Harris to transfer because of bias against lesbians. The advocacy group claimed that Portland was biased against lesbians for decades and cited a 1986 interview in which she claimed she talked to recruits and parents of recruits about lesbians stating, "I will not have it in my program." There were also claims of Portland telling key recruits—to discourage them from attending another school—that the other team was "full of lesbians." The lawsuit was eventually settled out of court and Penn State found Portland in violation of policy. She was fined $10,000 by the university in lieu of a one-game suspension and warned that another infraction would result in the termination of her employment. Rene Portland eventually resigned from her position as women's head basketball coach.

In 2007, British former Utah Jazz and Orlando Magic player John Amaechi became the first former NBA player to come out as gay.

=== 2010s ===
In 2010, the DC Gay Flag Football League was founded, joining two dozen other teams as part of the National Gay Flag Football League.

Also in 2010, Pia Sundhage, from Sweden, became the first openly lesbian coach of the United States women's national soccer team.

On October 4, 2012, Puerto Rican boxer Orlando Cruz came out as gay in an interview with Jessi Losada from Telemundo; this made him the first boxer to come out as gay while still active professionally. He won his first fight after coming out on October 20, 2012.

In 2013, soccer's Robbie Rogers came out as gay. Later in 2013, Robbie Rogers became the first openly gay man to compete in a top North American professional sports league when he played his first match for the LA Galaxy. In 2014, he became the first openly gay male athlete to win a major professional team sports title in the United States when the Galaxy were crowned MLS Cup champions.

Also in 2013, Matt Llano became the first openly gay distance runner.

Also in 2013, Jason Collins came out as gay; in 2014, he played for the Brooklyn Nets of the NBA, making him the first gay athlete to be out while actively playing in any of the four major North American professional sports leagues.

In the 2014 NFL draft, the St. Louis Rams drafted Michael Sam in the seventh round, the 249th of 256 players selected, which made him the first openly gay player to be drafted into the NFL. However, on August 30, St. Louis released Sam as part of a final round of cuts to reduce their roster to the league-mandated 53 players before the start of the regular season.

Also in 2014, Division III player Conner Mertens came out as bisexual in January 2014, becoming the first active college football player at any level to publicly come out as bisexual or gay. In August 2014, Arizona State player Chip Sarafin became the first publicly out active Division I player when he came out as gay.

Umpire Dale Scott came out as gay in 2014, becoming the first active openly gay official in the MLB, NBA, NFL or NHL.

Also in 2014, shortly after the end of the season, sophomore starting guard Derrick Gordon of the University of Massachusetts Amherst came out as gay, making him the first Division I men's basketball player to do so while still playing in college. Later that year, still playing for the University of Massachusetts Amherst, he became the first openly gay player in Division I to play in a men's basketball game.

In 2015, Sean Conroy became the first openly gay active professional baseball player, while playing for the Sonoma Stompers of the independent baseball league called the Pacific Association.

Later in 2015, David Denson, while playing for the Helena Brewers, a minor league team affiliated with the Milwaukee Brewers, became the first active player in affiliated professional baseball to come out as gay.

Jesse Taylor, a basketball player at Dakota Wesleyan University, came out as gay in 2015, making him South Dakota's first openly gay college athlete.

Also in 2015, Bryant University assistant basketball coach Chris Burns came out as gay, making him the first openly gay coach in NCAA Division I men's basketball.

Also in 2015, freestyle skier Gus Kenworthy, born in England, publicly came out as gay in an interview with ESPN. Rolling Stone noted the "freestyle medalist is the first action-sports star to come out."

In 2016, as a player for Seton Hall University, Derrick Gordon became the first openly gay man to play in the March Madness tournament.

Also in 2016, Curt Miller, head coach of the Connecticut Sun, became the first openly gay male head coach in the WNBA. He is believed to be the first openly gay male head coach of any professional sports team in the U.S.

In 2017, Scott Frantz became the first openly gay college football player to play in a game for an NCAA Division I Football Bowl Subdivision school.

Also in 2017, former tennis player Brian Vahaly came out as gay, making him the first gay man to publicly come out after playing on the ATP Tour.

In 2018, Tadd Fujikawa came out as gay, becoming the first male professional golfer to do so.

Also in 2018, at the 2018 Winter Olympics, Adam Rippon won a bronze medal in the figure skating team event as part of the U.S. team, which made him the United States' first openly gay athlete to win a medal at the Winter Olympics; previously that year he had become the first openly gay U.S. athlete to qualify for the Winter Olympics.

Also in 2018, Todd Harrity came out as gay, thus becoming the first openly gay professional male squash player in the world. At the time he was ranked No. 1 in the United States out of all male squash players.

Also in 2018, Bradley Kim of the United States Air Force Academy came out as gay, thus becoming the first openly gay football player to play for any military academy in the United States; open homosexuality was forbidden in the U.S. Armed Forces until 2011. That same year, Division II Wyatt Pertuset of Capital University became the first openly gay college player to score a touchdown.

Also in 2018, Abrahm DeVine, a swimmer for Stanford University, came out as gay, making him one of "very few openly gay swimmers competing on the elite level." In September 2019, DeVine said he was dropped from the Stanford team due to homophobia, which team coaches denied in a statement which did not include why they took the action.

In 2019, Nikki Hiltz, who came out as gay in 2014, became the first openly gay athlete to win a United States national track title.

=== 2020s ===
In January 2021, when Devon Rouse participated in the Automobile Racing Club of America (ARCA) test at Daytona, he became the first openly gay driver to compete in an ARCA-sanctioned event.

In June 2021, Carl Nassib, then of the Las Vegas Raiders, became the first active NFL player to come out as gay. He later became the first openly gay player in an NFL playoff game on January 15, 2022.

In 2022, Byron Perkins of Hampton University came out as gay, making him the first openly gay football player at any historically black college or university.

In 2022 or 2023, Seattle Kraken trainer Justin Rogers became the first known openly gay support staff in the NHL.

In 2023, Ronnie Gajownik became the first openly LBGTQ and second female manager in Minor League Baseball, for the High-A Hillsboro Hops.

Also in 2023, Jaguars assistant coach Kevin Maxen became the first coach in United States men's major professional sports to come out as gay.

In 2024, Amber Glenn, a pansexual and bisexual woman, became the first openly LGBTQ+ U.S. Women's Figure Skating Championship winner. In 2026 she was also the first openly LGBTQ woman representing the United States in Olympic singles figure skating.

Also in 2024, Nico Young, who had come out in 2022, became the first out gay man to represent USATF at the Olympics. In 2025, he became the first out gay man to win a United States national track title.

In 2026, Jake Adicoff won the 1.5km sprint at the Para Cross Country Skiing Sprint Vision Impaired Final of the 2026 Winter Paralympics, becoming the first openly gay male athlete to win a gold medal as an individual at any Winter Paralympics.

The Women's Pro Baseball League began play on August 1, 2026, with non-heterosexual players, including for example lesbian player Stephanie Everett.

== Individual sports ==
=== Auto racing ===
In 2003, Stephen Rhodes became the first openly gay NASCAR driver.

In January 2021, when Devon Rouse participated in the Automobile Racing Club of America (ARCA) test at Daytona, he became the first openly gay driver to compete in an ARCA-sanctioned event.

=== Bodybuilding ===
In 1971, Jim Morris became the first openly gay IFBB professional bodybuilder. In 1973 he became the first openly gay bodybuilder to win AAU Mr. America overall, most muscular, best arms, and best chest titles.

=== Boxing ===
On October 4, 2012, Puerto Rican boxer Orlando Cruz came out as gay in an interview with Jessi Losada from Telemundo; this made him the first boxer to come out as gay while still active professionally. He won his first fight after coming out on October 20, 2012.

=== Figure skating ===
Rudy Galindo won the men's title at the 1996 United States Figure Skating Championships. He was the first openly gay U.S. figure skating champion.

In 2024, Amber Glenn, a pansexual and bisexual woman, became the first openly LGBTQ+ U.S. Women's Figure Skating Championship winner. In 2026 she was also the first openly LGBTQ woman representing the United States in Olympic singles figure skating.

=== Golf ===
In 1996, Muffin Spencer-Devlin became the first LPGA player to come out as gay.

In 2018, Tadd Fujikawa came out as gay, becoming the first male professional golfer to do so.

=== Skiing ===
In 2015, freestyle skier Gus Kenworthy, born in England, publicly came out as gay in an interview with ESPN. Rolling Stone noted the "freestyle medalist is the first action-sports star to come out".

In 2026, Jake Adicoff won the 1.5 km sprint at the Para Cross Country Skiing Sprint Vision Impaired Final of the 2026 Winter Paralympics, becoming the first openly gay male athlete to win a gold medal as an individual at any Winter Paralympics.

=== Squash ===
In 2018, Todd Harrity came out as gay, thus becoming the first openly gay professional male squash player in the world. At the time he was ranked No. 1 in the United States out of all male squash players.

=== Swimming ===
In 2018, Abrahm DeVine, a swimmer for Stanford University, came out as gay, making him one of "very few openly gay swimmers competing on the elite level". In September 2019, DeVine said he was dropped from the Stanford team due to homophobia, which team coaches denied in a statement which did not include why they took the action.

=== Tennis ===
Tennis player Billie Jean King acknowledged her relationship with Marilyn Barnett when it became public in a May 1981 palimony lawsuit filed by Barnett, making Billie Jean the first prominent female professional athlete in the world to come out.

Former tennis player Brian Vahaly came out as gay in 2017, making him the first gay man to publicly come out after playing on the ATP Tour.

=== Track & Field ===
In 1998, at Oberlin College, former Northwestern and Auburn track coach Michael Muska became the first openly gay college athletics director.

Olympic medalists Louise Ritter and Kerron Clement came out as gay in retirement, as did Marion Jones.

In 2013, Matt Llano became the first openly gay distance runner. Nikki Hiltz came out as gay in 2014 and became the first openly gay athlete to win a United States national track title in 2019. Nico Young came out in 2022. In 2024, he became the first out gay man to represent USATF at the Olympics and in 2025, he became the first out gay man to win a United States national track title.

Other openly queer Olympians include Sha'carri Richardson, Raven Saunders, Erica Bougard, Aleia Hobbs, and Yared Nuguse. Additional notable openly queer athletes during their career include Chris Mosier, Addie Bracy, Jaleen Roberts, Annie Rodenfels, and Trey Cunningham.

== Team sports ==
=== Baseball ===
Some players from the 1943-1954 All-American Girls Professional Baseball League came out later in life.

Glenn Burke was the first Major League Baseball (MLB) player to come out as gay, announcing it in 1982 after he retired. Billy Bean became the second former MLB player to come out, in 1999.

Umpire Dale Scott came out as gay in 2014, becoming the first active openly gay official in the MLB, NBA, NFL or NHL.

In 2015, Sean Conroy became the first openly gay active professional baseball player, while playing for the Sonoma Stompers of the independent baseball league called the Pacific Association. Later in 2015, David Denson, while playing for the Helena Brewers, a minor league team affiliated with the Milwaukee Brewers, became the first active player in affiliated professional baseball to come out as gay. The highest league he played in after coming out was High-A, the third tier league in Minor League Baseball, in 2016.

In 2016, St. Louis Cardinals minor-league pitcher Tyler Dunnington announced he quit the sport in 2015, as a closeted gay player, due to homophobia in the sport.

In 2022, minor league player Solomon Bates came out as gay, stating he came out to teammates in 2019. After coming out, the highest league he played in was Double-A, the second tier league in Minor League Baseball, 2022-2023.

In 2023, Ronnie Gajownik became the first openly LBGTQ and second female manager in Minor League Baseball, for the High-A Hillsboro Hops.

The Women's Pro Baseball League began play on August 1, 2026, with non-heterosexual players, including for example lesbian player Stephanie Everett.

=== Basketball ===
In 1986, following the second Gay Games, Tony Jasinski organized the San Francisco Gay Basketball Association.

The case of Jennifer Harris against Penn State, more specifically their women's basketball coach Rene Portland, was about homosexuality. In 2006, a gay rights advocacy group, the National Center for Lesbian Rights, accused Rene Portland of forcing player Jennifer Harris to transfer because of bias against lesbians. The advocacy group claimed that Portland was biased against lesbians for decades and cited a 1986 interview in which she claimed she talked to recruits and parents of recruits about lesbians stating, "I will not have it in my program." There were also claims of Portland telling key recruits—to discourage them from attending another school—that the other team was "full of lesbians". The lawsuit was eventually settled out of court and Penn State found Portland in violation of policy. She was fined $10,000 by the university in lieu of a one-game suspension and warned that another infraction would result in the termination of her employment. Portland eventually resigned from her coaching position.

In 1999, Carol Blazejowski, general manager of the New York Liberty, came out as a lesbian and became the first general manager in the WNBA to do so.

In 2002, Sue Wicks came out as gay, making her the first openly gay person playing in the WNBA. Many WNBA players have since come out as gay; for example, Brittney Griner came out in 2013, and Elena Delle Donne came out in 2016. In 2025, openly gay players were estimated to make up 28% of the league.

In 2007, British former Utah Jazz and Orlando Magic player John Amaechi became the first former NBA player to come out as gay.

In 2013, Jason Collins publicly came out as gay. President Barack Obama contacted him offering his support. In 2014, Jason Collins played for the Brooklyn Nets of the NBA, making him the first openly gay athlete to play in any of the four major North American professional sports leagues.

In 2014, shortly after the end of the season, sophomore starting guard Derrick Gordon of the University of Massachusetts Amherst came out as gay, making him the first Division I men's basketball player to do so while still playing in college. Later that year, he became the first openly gay player in Division I to play in a men's basketball game. In 2016, as a player for Seton Hall University, he became the first openly gay man to play in the March Madness tournament.

Jesse Taylor, a basketball player at Dakota Wesleyan University, came out as gay in 2015, making him South Dakota's first openly gay college athlete.

In 2015, Bryant University assistant basketball coach Chris Burns came out as gay, making him the first openly gay coach in NCAA Division I men's basketball.

In 2016, Curt Miller, head coach of the Connecticut Sun, became the first openly gay male head coach in the WNBA. He is believed to be the first openly gay male head coach of any professional sports team in the U.S.

=== Figure skating (team events) ===
At the 2018 Winter Olympics, Adam Rippon won a bronze medal in the figure skating team event as part of the U.S. team, which made him the United States' first openly gay athlete to win a medal at the Winter Olympics; previously that year he had become the first openly gay U.S. athlete to qualify for the Winter Olympics.

=== Flag football ===
In 2002, the National Gay Flag Football League was founded. In 2010, the DC Gay Flag Football League was founded, joining two dozen other teams as part of the National Gay Flag Football League.

=== Football ===
In 1975, former football player David Kopay became the first professional athlete from a major team sport to come out as gay.

Football player Alissa Wykes of the Philadelphia Liberty Belles became one of the first active American athletes to publicly come out as gay when she announced that she was a lesbian in an article in the December 2001/January 2002 edition of Sports Illustrated for Women.

In the 2014 NFL draft, the St. Louis Rams drafted Michael Sam in the seventh round, the 249th of 256 players selected, which made him the first openly gay player to be drafted into the NFL. However, on August 30, St. Louis released Sam as part of a final round of cuts to reduce their roster to the league-mandated 53 players before the start of the regular season.

In June 2021, Las Vegas Raiders defensive end Carl Nassib came out as gay via Instagram, making him the first openly gay active player in the NFL. He later became the first openly gay player in an NFL playoff game on January 15, 2022.

In 2023, Jaguars assistant coach Kevin Maxen became the first coach in United States men's major professional sports to come out as gay.

Division III player Conner Mertens came out as bisexual in January 2014, becoming the first active college football player at any level to publicly come out as bisexual or gay. In August 2014, Arizona State player Chip Sarafin became the first publicly out active Division I player when he came out as gay. In 2017, Scott Frantz publicly came out as gay, joining My-King Johnson as two of the first openly gay players in the NCAA Division I Football Bowl Subdivision. Later that same year, Frantz became the first openly gay college football player to play in a game for an NCAA Division I Football Bowl Subdivision school. In 2018, Bradley Kim of the United States Air Force Academy came out as gay, thus becoming the first openly gay football player to play for any military academy in the United States; open homosexuality was forbidden in the U.S. Armed Forces until 2011. Also in 2018, Division II Wyatt Pertuset of Capital University became the first openly gay college player to score a touchdown. In 2022, Byron Perkins of Hampton University came out as gay, making him the first openly gay football player at any historically black college or university.

=== Hockey ===
In 1985, the Los Angeles Blades became the first gay hockey team in the United States.

The New York City Gay Hockey Association was organized in 1999.

Four-time Olympic medalist Julie Chu is considered among the earliest known LGBT female professional hockey players. She began dating her Canadian rival, four-time Olympic gold medalist Caroline Ouellette, around 2006.

In 2021, Canadian Luke Prokop, who was drafted by the Nashville Predators in the 2020 NHL entry draft, became the first active player signed to a National Hockey League contract to come out as gay. On November 17, 2023, Prokop became the first openly gay player in the American Hockey League's history, by making his first appearance in a game as a player for the Milwaukee Admirals.

In 2022 or 2023, Seattle Kraken trainer Justin Rogers became the first known openly gay support staff in the NHL.

=== Rugby ===
In 1998, the Washington Renegades RFC was formed as the first gay rugby team in the United States.

=== Soccer ===
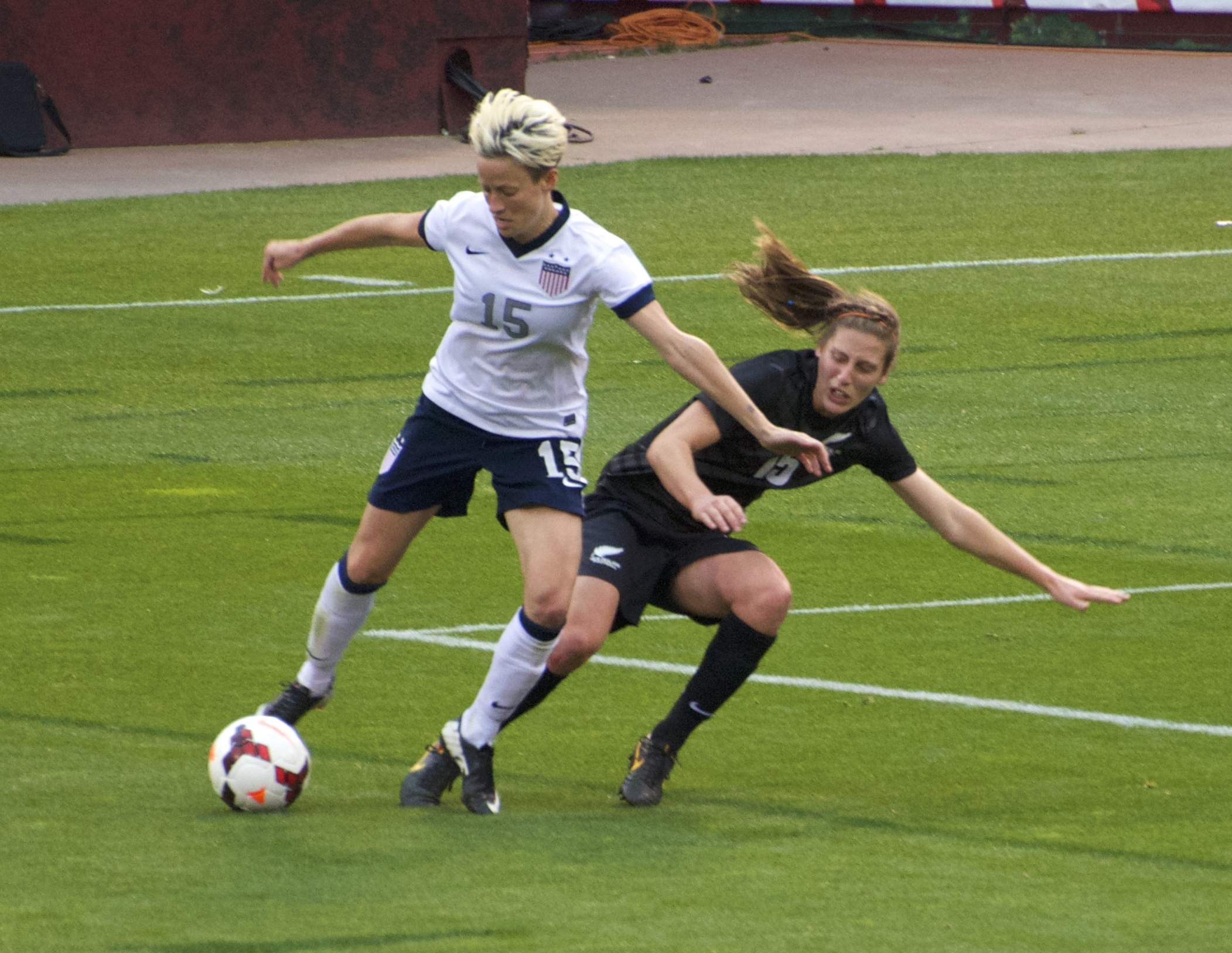
Rapinoe battles for the ball during a friendly match against New Zealand in 2013.

The New York Ramblers began in 1980 when an ad was placed in the Village Voice to gay men who wanted to play soccer as a team called the Rambles.

In 2013, Robbie Rogers publicly came out as gay. President Barack Obama contacted him offering his support. Thierry Henry, at the time playing in Major League Soccer, was quoted in a column for New York Daily News as saying "he (Rogers) is a human being, first of all. And that's good enough." Later in 2013, Robbie Rogers became the first openly gay man to compete in a top North American professional sports league when he played his first match for the LA Galaxy. In 2014, Rogers became the first openly gay male athlete to win a major professional team sports title in the United States when the Galaxy were crowned MLS Cup champions.

In 2018, MLS player Collin Martin became the only openly gay player, at the time, in any of the five major men's professional sport leagues.

In 2010, Pia Sundhage, from Sweden, became the first openly lesbian coach of the United States women's national soccer team. Many female soccer players have been openly gay while actively playing for American teams, such as Joanna Lohman and Megan Rapinoe. Rapinoe came out in 2012, while a midfielder for the Seattle Sounders and while on the United States women's national soccer team. An estimated 13% of players were out at the 2023 FIFA World Cup.

=== Softball ===
In 1977, the North American Gay Amateur Athletic Alliance was formed for gay softball teams.

Kirk Walker came out as gay to the Oregon State Beavers softball team while he was their head coach in 2005, and while still the head coach came out to the website Outsports in 2007. He was the first openly gay male coach in NCAA Division I history.

== See also ==
- Homosexuality in college sports
- Homosexuality in modern sports
- List of LGBTQ sportspeople
- Training Rules, a documentary film
- Transgender people in sports
