= LGBTQ people in college sports =

Although gay athletes and coaches are increasingly accepted in college sports, they continue to be controversial among some people.

== Athletes ==
A study published in the Journal of Sex Research in February of 1977 found that around 25% of all male college athletes have had gay experiences.

=== American college basketball ===
The case of Jennifer Harris against Penn State, more specifically their women's basketball coach Rene Portland, was about homosexuality. In 2006, a gay rights advocacy group, the National Center for Lesbian Rights, accused Rene Portland of forcing player Jennifer Harris to transfer because of bias against lesbians. The advocacy group claimed that Portland was biased against lesbians for decades and cited a 1986 interview in which she claimed she talked to recruits and parents of recruits about lesbians stating, "I will not have it in my program." There were also claims of Portland telling key recruits—to discourage them from attending another school—that the other team was "full of lesbians." The lawsuit was eventually settled out of court and Penn State found Portland in violation of policy. She was fined $10,000 by the university in lieu of a one-game suspension and warned that another infraction would result in the termination of her employment. Rene Portland eventually resigned from her position as women's head basketball coach.

In 2014, shortly after the end of the season, sophomore starting guard Derrick Gordon of the University of Massachusetts Amherst came out as gay, making him the first Division I men's basketball player to do so while still playing in college. Later that year, still playing for the University of Massachusetts Amherst, he became the first openly gay player in Division I to play in a men's basketball game. In 2016, as a player for Seton Hall University, he became the first openly gay man to play in the March Madness tournament.

Jesse Taylor, a basketball player at Dakota Wesleyan University, came out as gay in 2015, making him South Dakota's first openly gay college athlete.

=== American college football ===
Division II college football player Brian Sims came out as gay to his team in 2000 while playing for Bloomsburg University of Pennsylvania, and publicly told his story in 2009. Alan Gendreau was openly gay to his Middle Tennessee Blue Raiders football team from 2008 through 2011, but the team made no mention of it to the media. Otherwise, he could have been the first publicly out gay active player in Division I college football. Outsports, a website specializing in LGBTQ people in sports, released his story about being a gay football player on April 23, 2013.

Division III player Conner Mertens came out as bisexual in January 2014, becoming the first active college football player at any level to publicly come out as bisexual or gay. In August 2014, Arizona State player Chip Sarafin became the first publicly out active Division I player when he came out as gay. The following season, in 2015, another Division I offensive lineman, Mason Darrow of Princeton University, also came out as gay publicly. In 2017, Scott Frantz publicly came out as gay, joining My-King Johnson as two of the first openly gay players in the NCAA Division I Football Bowl Subdivision. Later that same year, Frantz became the first openly gay college football player to play in a game for an NCAA Division I Football Bowl Subdivision school. In 2018, Bradley Kim of the United States Air Force Academy came out as gay, thus becoming the first openly gay football player to play for any military academy in the United States; open homosexuality was forbidden in the U.S. Armed Forces until 2011. Also in 2018, Division II Wyatt Pertuset of Capital University became the first openly gay college player to score a touchdown. In 2022, Byron Perkins of Hampton University came out as gay, making him the first openly gay football player at any historically black college or university.

=== American college swimming ===
In 2018, Abrahm DeVine, a swimmer for Stanford University, came out as gay, making him one of "very few openly gay swimmers competing on the elite level." In September 2019, DeVine said he was dropped from the Stanford team due to homophobia, which team coaches denied in a statement which did not include why they took the action.

== Coaches ==
Kirk Walker came out as gay to the Oregon State Beavers softball team while he was their head coach in 2005, and while still the head coach came out to the website Outsports in 2007. He was the first openly gay male coach in NCAA Division I history.

In 2015, Bryant University assistant basketball coach Chris Burns came out as gay, making him the first openly gay coach in NCAA Division I men's basketball.

== See also ==
- Homosexuality in modern sports
- List of LGBTQ sportspeople
- Training Rules, a documentary film
- Transgender people in sports
