= Homosexuality in American football =

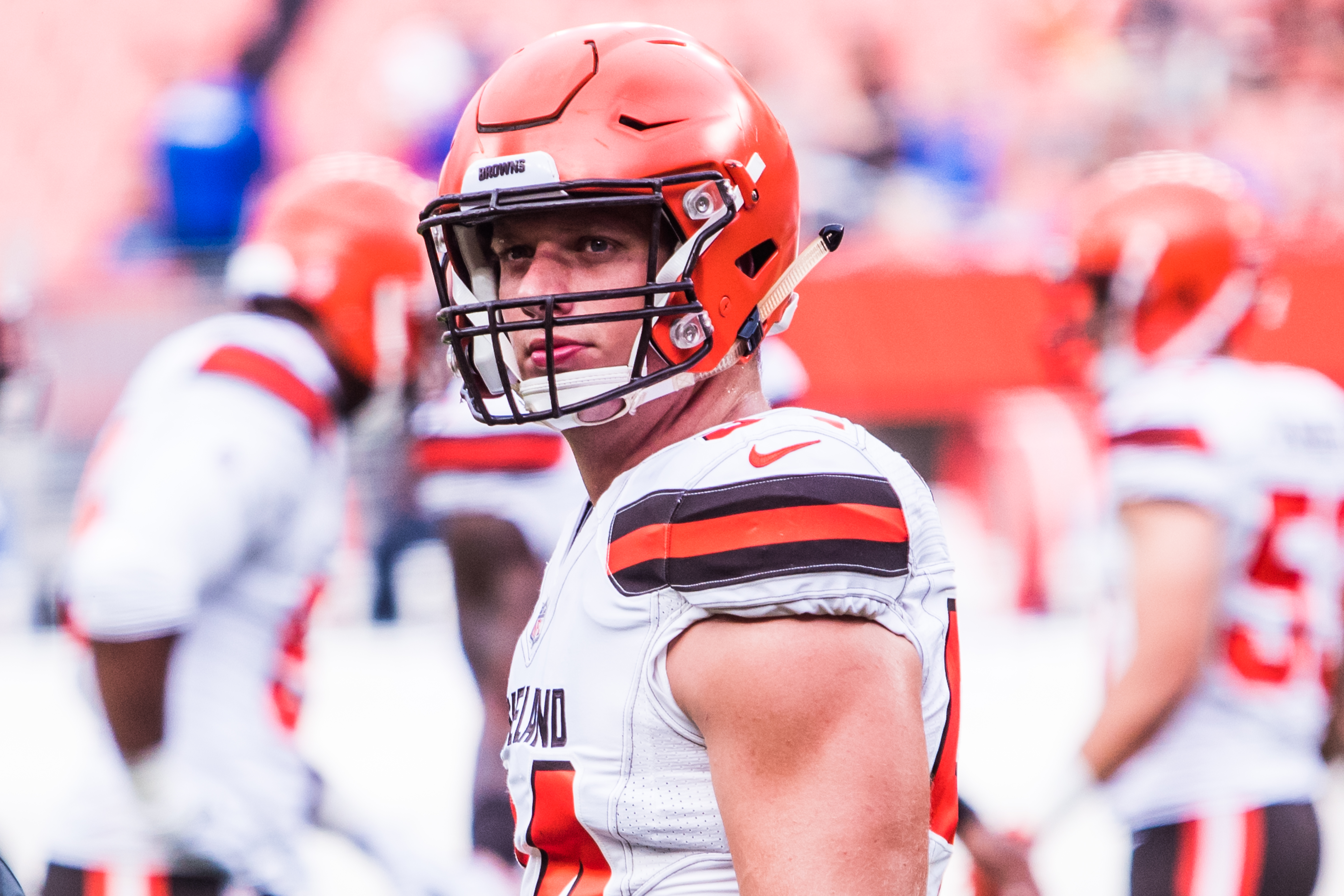
In 2021, Carl Nassib became the first active player in the NFL to publicly come out.

Homosexuality in American football has historically been a taboo subject. The generally masculine environment that exists in men's American football, along with the hypermasculinity promoted by sportscasters, make it difficult for players to come out.

In women's football in 2001, Philadelphia Liberty Belles player Alissa Wykes of the National Women's Football Association (NWFA) came out publicly as lesbian. In men's football, after he retired, NFL player David Kopay in 1975 was the first major professional team-sport athlete to come out as gay. Players did not come out at the college level until the 2010s. In college football, Division III player Conner Mertens came out as bisexual in January 2014, becoming the first active college football player at any level to publicly come out as bisexual or gay. In August 2014, Arizona State player Chip Sarafin became the first publicly out active Division I player when he came out as gay.

There has been only one player who has publicly come out as gay or bisexual while being an active player in the National Football League (NFL): Carl Nassib, who came out as gay on June 21, 2021, while with the Las Vegas Raiders. He became the first openly gay player to play in an NFL game on September 13, 2021. He later became the first openly gay player in an NFL playoff game on January 15, 2022.

Six former NFL players have come out publicly after they retired. Before Carl Nassib's coming out, many experts believed that the first openly gay active NFL player would not be a current athlete, but instead an already out high school or college player who ends up in the NFL.

== History ==
=== 1960s to 1980s ===
While Vince Lombardi was head coach of the Green Bay Packers from 1959 to 1967, he was known to treat his players roughly in practices and during games, but he insisted on unconditional respect for gay players and front office staff. Demanding "Nothing but Acceptance" from players and coaches toward all people, Lombardi would fire a coach or release a player should they insult the sexual orientation of anyone. During his time in Washington, Lombardi's assistant general manager, David Slatterly, was gay, as was PR director Joe Blair, who was described as Lombardi's "right-hand man". According to son Vince Lombardi Jr.:

He saw everyone as equals, and I think having a gay brother (Hal) was a big factor in his approach...I think my father would've felt, 'I hope I've created an atmosphere in the locker room where this would not be an issue at all. And if you do have an issue, the problem will be yours because my locker room will tolerate nothing but acceptance.'

Upon his arrival in Washington to coach the Redskins in 1969, Lombardi was aware of tight end Jerry Smith's gay sexual orientation. "Lombardi protected and loved Jerry", said former teammate Dave Kopay. Lombardi brought Smith into his office and told him that his sexual orientation would never be an issue as long as he was coaching the Redskins; Smith would be judged solely on his on-the-field performance and contribution to the team's success. Under Lombardi's leadership Smith flourished, becoming an integral part of Lombardi's offense, and was voted a First Team All-Pro for the first time in his career, which was also Lombardi's only season as Redskin head coach.

Lombardi invited other gay players to training camp, and would privately hope they would prove they could earn a spot on the team. At the Washington Redskins training camp in 1969, Ray McDonald was a gay player, with sub-par skills, who was trying to maintain his spot on the roster, but this time with Lombardi as the Redskins' new head coach. True to his word, Lombardi told running back coach George Dickson, "I want you to get on McDonald and work on him and work on him – and if I hear one of you people make reference to his manhood, you'll be out of here before your ass hits the ground."

NFL player David Kopay retired in 1972. In 1975, he became the first major professional athlete in a team sport to come out as gay.

Jerry Smith died of AIDS at age 43 on October 15, 1986, at Holy Cross Hospital in Silver Spring, Maryland. He was the first former professional athlete to die of the disease. Although he acknowledged that he had AIDS, he never publicly acknowledged he was gay.

=== 1990s and 2000s ===
In December 2013, former teammates on the 1993 Houston Oilers said that at least two key players on the roster were generally known by the team to be gay and that they were accepted by the team. Teammate Bubba McDowell said showering with the gay teammates was "no big deal".

NWFA player Alissa Wykes came out as a lesbian in 2001. After she came out in the December/January 2002 edition of Sports Illustrated for Women, the league's owner Catherine Masters condemned her for pursuing her own "personal agenda", stating that the league had received "hundreds of phone calls. Gay people were saying it was horrible. Straight people were saying it was great." In 2003, as a panel member at the first National Gay/Lesbian Athletics Conference in Cambridge, Massachusetts, Wykes joked that she felt "great empathy for the women on my team who are straight. I mean—a straight female football player?"

Division II college football player Brian Sims came out as gay to his team in 2000 while playing for Bloomsburg University of Pennsylvania, and publicly told his story in 2009.

=== 2010s ===
Alan Gendreau was openly gay to his Middle Tennessee Blue Raiders football team from 2008 through 2011, but he made no mention of it to the media. Otherwise, he could have been the first publicly out gay active player in Division I college football. Outsports, a website specializing in LGBTQ people in sports, released his story about being a gay football player on April 23, 2013.

In January 2014, Conner Mertens of the Division III Willamette Bearcats publicly came out as bisexual, becoming the first active college football player at any level to publicly come out as bisexual. In August, Chip Sarafin came out as gay, becoming the first active Division I player to come out as gay. The following season, in 2015, another Division I offensive lineman, Mason Darrow of Princeton University, also came out as gay publicly.

CBSSports.com reported in April 2013 that one NFL team had a player that was not openly gay, but his teammates were aware that he was gay and did not care. That same month, Ayanbadejo said there were up to four NFL players who were considering coming out as gay on the same day with the hope that any backlash would be shared and the pressure on one person reduced. NFL commissioner Roger Goodell emphasized that discrimination based on sexual orientation was unacceptable in the NFL. His statement came after players said they were asked during the NFL Scouting Combine if they liked girls.

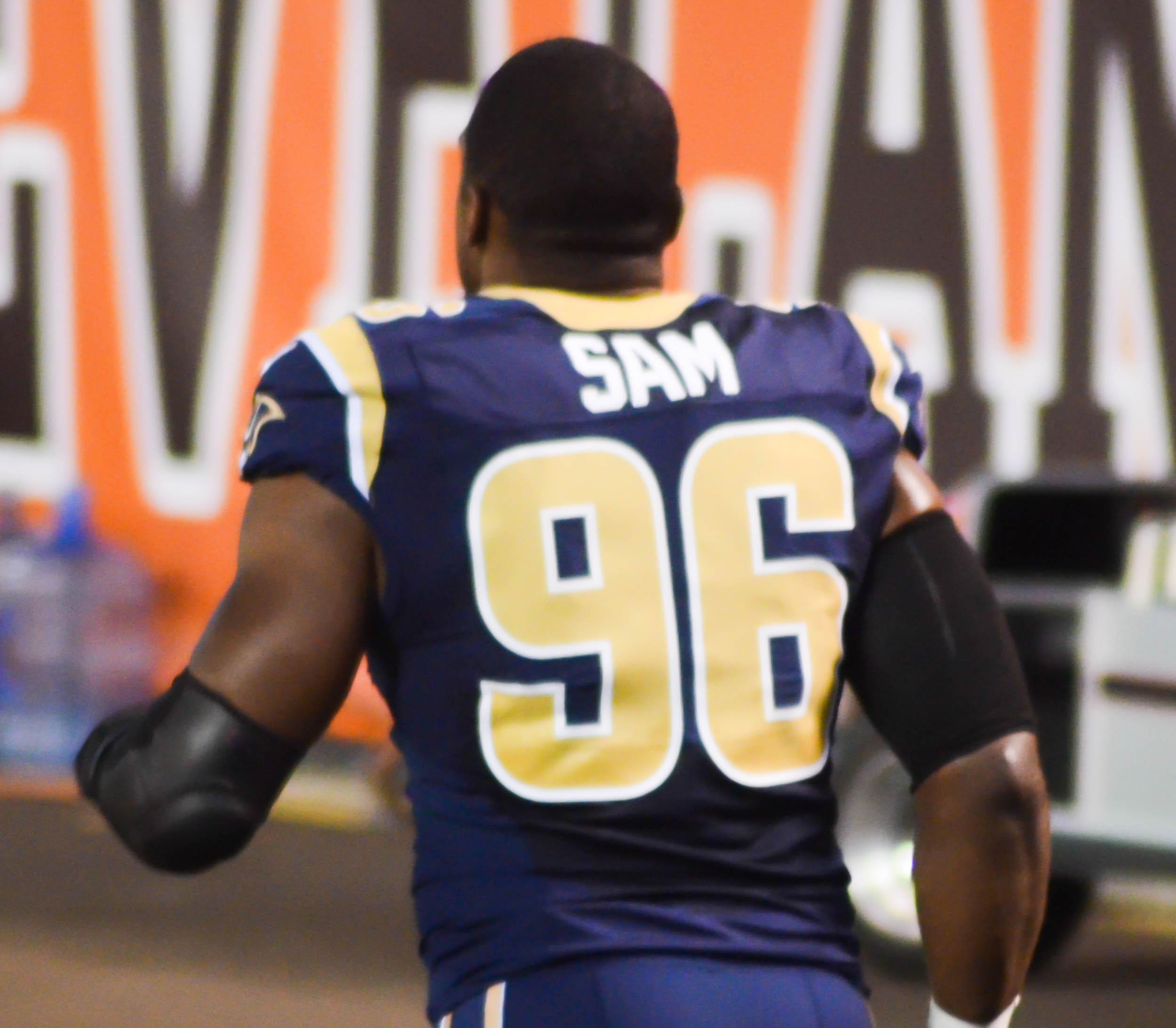
Selected by the St. Louis Rams in 2014, Michael Sam was the first publicly gay player to be drafted into the NFL.

In February 2014, Michael Sam publicly came out as gay after his college career had ended. He became the first publicly gay player drafted in the NFL when he was selected in the seventh round of the 2014 draft. In the 2014 NFL draft, the St. Louis Rams drafted Michael Sam in the seventh round, the 249th of 256 players selected, which made him the first openly gay player to be drafted into the NFL. However, on August 30, St. Louis released Sam as part of a final round of cuts to reduce their roster to the league-mandated 53 players before the start of the regular season.

In 2017, Scott Frantz publicly came out as gay, joining My-King Johnson as two of the first openly gay players in the NCAA Division I Football Bowl Subdivision. Later that same year, Frantz became the first openly gay college football player to play in a game for an NCAA Division I Football Bowl Subdivision school.

In 2018, Bradley Kim of the United States Air Force Academy came out as gay, thus becoming the first openly gay football player to play for any military academy in the United States; open homosexuality was forbidden in the U.S. Armed Forces until 2011. Also in 2018, Division II Wyatt Pertuset of Capital University became the first openly gay college player to score a touchdown.

In November 2018, former player Jeff Rohrer became the first known current or former NFL player to be in a same-sex marriage.

In August 2019, free agent Ryan Russell came out publicly as bisexual in an essay he penned for ESPN.

=== 2020s ===
In June 2021, Raiders defensive end Carl Nassib came out as gay via Instagram, becoming the first active NFL player to do so. He announced a $100,000 donation to The Trevor Project as part of the post. Nassib was entering his sixth NFL season and the second year of his three-year contract with the Las Vegas Raiders. He became the first openly gay player to play in an NFL game on September 13, 2021. He later became the first openly gay player in an NFL playoff game on January 15, 2022.

In 2022, Byron Perkins of Hampton University came out as gay, making him the first openly gay football player at any historically black college or university.

== Reception ==
=== By players ===
Heterosexuality is flaunted in NFL locker rooms with the passing of pornographic magazines and videos, and visits to strip clubs. Anti-gay slurs are sometimes used in the locker room. Fear of backlash from employers, teammates and fans has stopped players from coming out.

Before Super Bowl XLVII in 2013, San Francisco 49ers player Chris Culliver on media day during an interview with The Artie Lange Show, was asked if he thought any gay players were on his team which he replied "No, we don't got no gay people on the team, they gotta get up out of here if they do...Can't be with that sweet stuff." He also opined that any gay players should wait 10 years after retiring before coming out. Culliver received backlash for his comments. Baltimore Ravens player Brendon Ayanbadejo, an advocate for same-sex marriage, estimated that 50 percent of the league agreed with Culliver, 25 percent disagreed, and 25 percent were accepting of everyone even if they were not in complete support of issues such as gay marriage. Culliver later apologized for his "ugly comments" that were "not what I feel in my heart".

NFL player Ryan O'Callaghan came out publicly as gay in 2017; he came out to Kansas City Chiefs general manager Scott Pioli before his NFL career ended in 2011. In 2019, O'Callaghan said "I think it's safe to say there's at least one on every team who is either gay or bisexual. A lot of guys still see it as potentially having a negative impact on their career."

=== By leagues and teams ===
The NFL Collective Bargaining Agreement in 2011 contained added protections banning discrimination based on sexual orientation. In 2013, the NFL Rookie Symposium planned for the first time to have speakers on the issue of sexual orientation. The same year, NFL player Chris Kluwe was released by the Minnesota Vikings, which he believed was due to his being outspoken in support of same-sex marriage. He said that special teams coach Mike Priefer in 2012 made homophobic remarks and criticized the player for his views on same-sex marriage, a charge Priefer denied. Kluwe also alleged that head coach Leslie Frazier told him to stop speaking about same-sex marriage. In June 2021, the NFL tweeted in support of the LGBTQ+ community by advocating for The Trevor Project and matching player Carl Nassib's donation of $100,000 while linking the website for fans to donate as well. After Nassib officially came out, Morning Consult conducted a survey gauging the likelihood of watching the NFL. The survey was concluded with the result of 1 out of 3 LGBTQ+ adults are more interested in watching the NFL following Nassib coming out. This contributes to the general goal of the LGBTQ+ community of gaining more representation within sports so that more LGBTQ+ athletes feel comfortable to participate.

Ahead of Super Bowl LVI, the NFL partnered with GLAAD made history by hosting an event where associates of the NFL were able to mingle with supporters and officials of GLAAD. "LGBTQ athletes need to see more stories of athletes like them, who are supported by their teammates, because so many of them are accepted, just as they are," GLAAD Deputy President and COO Darra Gordon said in her remarks. "I hope young LGBTQ athletes see posts from tonight and know that they have a rightful place to be out in the NFL, in football, in sports, and at any cultural milestone they aim for."

=== By the media ===
Prior to any public outings, there was some media interest in the experience of gay professional athletes. David Kopay, the first former NFL player to publicly come out, said that he was inspired by negative reactions to a story on the hardships of gay professional athletes that included a quote from his teammate Jerry Smith, with whom he had a sexual encounter while playing together.

In 2014, ESPN reported on Michael Sam's showering habits in the St. Louis Rams locker room, but later apologized that it "failed to meet the standards we have set in reporting on LGBT-related topics in sports."

In contrast to frequent homophobic attitudes within the sport, media coverage has generally been very favorable towards openly gay athletes, often describing gay athletes as gay and even heroic. However, positive coverage would often use implicitly homophobic language emphasizing the contrast between gay players and straight players. While this framing emphasizing progress is most common in media, common framing also includes reporters highlighting the continued lack of acceptance among players, with few active players publicly supporting players such as Nassib.

== Players ==
Players who came out
Name	Highest level	Position	Ref
Mason Darrow	NCAA Division I	Offensive lineman	
Wade Davis	NFL	Cornerback	
Scott Frantz	NCAA Division I	Offensive tackle	
Ed Gallagher	NCAA Division I	Offensive tackle	
Alan Gendreau	NCAA Division I	Placekicker	
Kwame Harris	NFL	Offensive tackle	
Bradley Kim	NCAA Division I	Defensive back	
David Kopay	NFL	Running back	
Ray McDonald	NFL	Running back	
Conner Mertens	NCAA Division III	Placekicker	
Carl Nassib	NFL	Defensive end	
Ryan O'Callaghan	NFL	Offensive tackle	
Wyatt Pertuset	NCAA Division III	Wide receiver	
Jeff Rohrer	NFL	Linebacker	
Ryan Russell	NFL	Defensive end	
Michael Sam	NFL^{†}^{§}	Defensive end	
Chip Sarafin	NCAA Division I	Offensive lineman	
Roy Simmons	NFL	Guard	
Brian Sims	NCAA Division II	Defensive tackle	
Jerry Smith*	NFL	Tight end	
Brad Thorson	NFL^{‡}	Offensive lineman	
Esera Tuaolo	NFL	Defensive tackle	
Colton Underwood	NFL^{§}	Tight end	
Jacob Van Ittersum	NCAA Division II	Offensive lineman	
Alissa Wykes	NWFA	Running back	
Theodore Lisoski	AFBN	Linebacker	

* Posthumously outed
^{†} Selected in the NFL draft, never played in the league
^{‡} Placed on injured reserve, never played in the league
^{§} Practice squad member, never played in the league

== See also ==
- Homosexuality in modern sports
- LGBTQ people in college sports
- LGBTQ people in sports in the United States
- Homosexuality in association football
- Homosexuality in Australian rules football
- List of LGBT sportspeople
- List of LGBTQ+ American football players
