= David Kopay =

American football player (born 1942)

No. 43, 40
- Position: Running back

Personal information
- Born: June 28, 1942 (age 84); Chicago, Illinois, U.S.
- Listed height: 6 ft 0 in (1.83 m)
- Listed weight: 218 lb (99 kg)

Career information
- High school: Notre Dame (Sherman Oaks, California)
- College: Washington
- NFL draft: 1964: undrafted

Career history
- San Francisco 49ers (1964–1967); Detroit Lions (1968); Washington Redskins (1969–1970); New Orleans Saints (1971); Green Bay Packers (1972)

Awards and highlights
- Second-team All-PCC (1963)

Career NFL statistics
- Rushing Yards: 876
- Average: 3.7
- Touchdowns: 3
- Stats at Pro Football Reference

David Marquette Kopay (born June 28, 1942) is an American former professional football player who was a running back in the National Football League (NFL). He played college football for the Washington Huskies. In 1975, he became one of the first professional athletes to come out as gay.

== Life ==
Kopay attended Notre Dame High School in Sherman Oaks, California. He entered the University of Washington in 1961. He was on the West roster as a halfback at the All-America East vs. West Football Game in 1964. Kopay was signed by the San Francisco 49ers, and played professional football from 1964 to 1972. After he retired from the NFL, he was considered a top contender for coaching positions, but he believes he was snubbed by professional and college teams because of his sexual orientation. Kopay went to work as a salesman/purchaser in his uncle's floorcovering business in Hollywood. He is also a board member of the Gay and Lesbian Athletics Foundation.

Kopay's 1977 biography, The David Kopay Story, written with Perry Deane Young, became a best-seller. In 1986, Kopay, without naming him, revealed his brief affair with Jerry Smith, a football player who played for the Washington Redskins from 1965 to 1977 and who died of AIDS without ever having publicly come out of the closet.

== Social impact ==
Since Kopay, six additional former NFL players have come out as gay, Roy Simmons in 1992, Esera Tuaolo in 2002, Wade Davis in 2012, Kwame Harris in 2013, Ryan O'Callaghan in 2017, and Colton Underwood in 2021. To date, only one current NFL player, Carl Nassib, has come out publicly as gay (in 2021). Kopay has been credited with inspiring these athletes to be more open about their sexual orientation. In May 1977, Kopay was on the cover of GPU (Gay People's Union) News of Milwaukee.

Kopay appears as himself in a small but pivotal role in the film Tru Loved (2008). His scene features young actor Matthew Thompson and Alexandra Paul.

Kopay became a Gay Games Ambassador for the Federation of Gay Games. He went to Gay Games VII in Chicago in July 2006 and was a featured announcer in the opening ceremonies.

Kopay announced in September 2007 that he will leave $1 million as an endowment to the University of Washington Q Center.

== See also ==
- Homosexuality in American football
