= Scott Frantz =

Scott Frantz may refer to:

- Scott Frantz (politician) (born 1960), American politician
- Scott Frantz (American football) (born 1996), American football offensive tackle
