= Gay and Lesbian Athletics Foundation =

American organization for LGBTQ athletes

The Gay and Lesbian Athletics Foundation (GLAF) is a nonprofit organization based in Cambridge, Massachusetts, in the United States. Its purpose is to increase acceptance and visibility of LGBTQ athletes in the professional, amateur, and recreational athletics communities.

GLAF managing director Noa Padowitz describes the group's objectives:

Our goals are twofold: One, create a community of gay athletes who can communicate with each other regularly. Two, help cultivate an environment in sports in which athletes are accepted and respected without regard to their sexual orientation. In the process, we help to create positive role models for the society at large.

GLAF's advisory board includes many prominent gay and lesbian athletes, including tennis player Billie Jean King, former National Football League players Dave Kopay and Esera Tuaolo, former Major League Baseball player Billy Bean, Olympian gold medalists Bruce Hayes and Mark Tewksbury, and triathlete Christopher Bergland.

== See also ==
- Homosexuality in modern sports
- LGBTQ community
