= Esera Tuaolo =

American football player (born 1968)

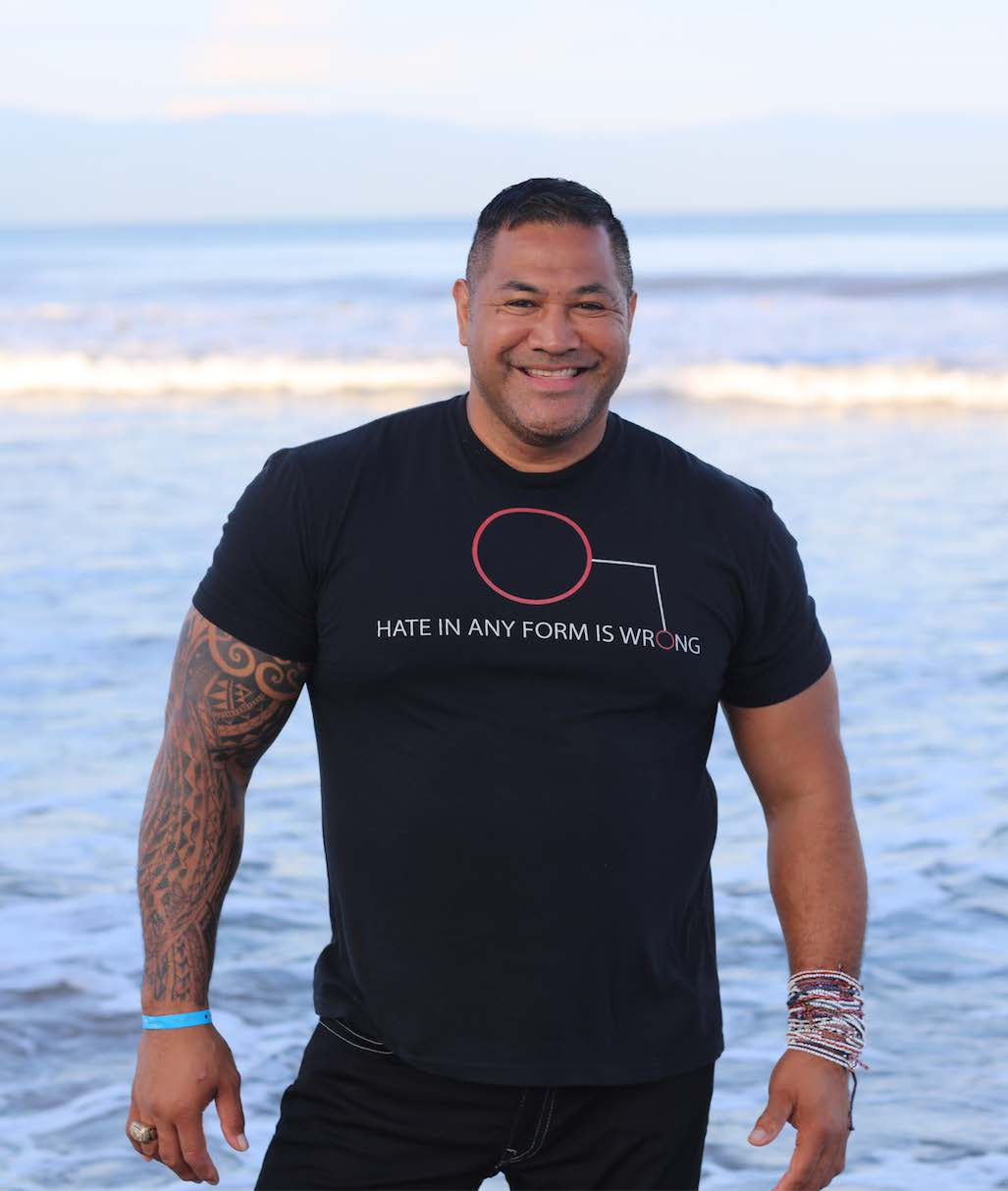
- Tuaolo in 2021

No. 98, 95, 93
- Position: Defensive tackle

Personal information
- Born: July 11, 1968 (age 58); Honolulu, Hawaii, U.S.
- Listed height: 6 ft 2 in (1.88 m)
- Listed weight: 277 lb (126 kg)

Career information
- High school: Chino (CA) Don Antonio Lugo
- College: Oregon State
- NFL draft: 1991: 2nd round, 35th overall pick

Career history
- Green Bay Packers (1991–1992); Minnesota Vikings (1992–1996); Buffalo Bills (1997)*; Jacksonville Jaguars (1997); Atlanta Falcons (1998); Carolina Panthers (1999)
- * Offseason or practice squad member only

Awards and highlights
- Morris Trophy (1989); First-team All-Pac-10 (1990); NCAA Inspiration Award (2024)

Career NFL statistics
- Tackles: 200
- Sacks: 12
- Fumble recoveries: 4
- Stats at Pro Football Reference

Esera Tavai Tuaolo (born July 11, 1968), nicknamed "Mr. Aloha", is an American former professional football player who was a defensive tackle for nine seasons in the National Football League (NFL). He played college football for the Oregon State Beavers.

== Football career ==
At Oregon State University, Tuaolo was a member of the Pi Kappa Alpha fraternity. He won the Morris Trophy in 1989, which is given to the best defensive lineman in the Pac-10. He was named Pac-10 Conference First-team twice and as a senior he was a finalist for the Lombardi Award and Outland Trophy.

Tuaolo then had a successful career as a nose tackle in the NFL for nine seasons, playing for five NFL teams. The Green Bay Packers drafted him in the 1991 NFL draft in the second round as the 35th overall pick. He played 20 games for the Green Bay Packers from 1991 to 1992, was the first rookie in Packer history to start all 16 games in a season, and was a member of the 1991 All-Rookie team. Tuaolo then played 60 games for the Minnesota Vikings from 1992 to 1996; 6 games for the Jacksonville Jaguars in 1997; 13 games for the Atlanta Falcons in 1998; and 12 games for the Carolina Panthers in 1999. In his 9-year career he recorded 200 tackles, 12 sacks, and 1 interception, and, in 1998, won the NFC Championship with the Atlanta Falcons before losing in the Super Bowl to the Denver Broncos. During that Super Bowl XXXIII, Tuaolo recorded the last tackle of football legend John Elway.

== Music career ==
Tuaolo has entertained a singing career during and after football. While with the Packers, for example, Tuaolo once sang the National Anthem in full pads before a game against the Chicago Bears, and then immediately after started in that game. He has since sung the anthem at professional sporting events, from NFL, MLB, NHL, and NBA games to the opening ceremony of the Gay Games VII, a quadrennial Olympics-style event. He has also released his own music, such as "Stronger" and "Another Broken Heart" the latter with Lari White, and has performed at various venues and events in the United States and Europe.

=== The Voice ===
In 2017, he auditioned for season 13 of The Voice singing "Rise Up" from Andra Day. Two of the four judges, Jennifer Hudson and Blake Shelton turned their chair. Tuaolo chose to be on Team Blake. In the Battle round, he was paired with Team Blake contestant Rebecca Brunner, both singing "This I Promise You" from NSYNC. Coach Shelton chose Tuaolo to go to the Knockouts round.

In the Knockouts, he confronted Adam Cunningham. Tuaolo sang "Superstar" from Delaney & Bonnie made famous by The Carpenters and also famously covered by Luther Vandross. Coach Shelton opted to keep Tuaolo for the playoff round, eliminating Cunningham from his team.

On the Playoffs broadcast on November 13, 2017, he sang "How Do I Live" from LeAnn Rimes. Blake Shelton, being forced to pick only three of his team's six finalists, chose to exclude Tuaolo from his final three, thus eliminating Tuaolo from the competition.

== Personal life ==
Tuaolo is of Samoan descent. In 2002, having retired from sports in 1999, Tuaolo announced to the public that he is gay, coming out on HBO's Real Sports. This made him the third former NFL player to come out, after David Kopay and Roy Simmons. Another NFL player, Garrison Hearst, made anti-gay comments when he heard the news, but he later apologized.

Tuaolo met his partner, Mitchell Wherley, at a nightclub in 1995, and the couple hid their relationship from the public. Between Tuaolo's retirement from the NFL and coming out as gay, he and Wherley adopted twin infants - a boy and a girl. Tuaolo and Wherley's relationship ended in 2007.

Since coming out, Tuaolo has been a strong advocate for the LGBT community. He has worked with the NFL to combat homophobia in the league and is a board member of the Gay and Lesbian Athletics Foundation. Tuaolo has testified at the Minnesota state legislature Senate Judiciary Committee hearing in opposition to an anti-gay marriage bill. He makes and has made appearances on various television programs, including The Oprah Winfrey Show, The Tyra Banks Show, Good Morning America and The Ellen DeGeneres Show, to talk about and combat homophobia. Tuaolo's current LGBT advocacy primarily involves speaking at colleges and corporations about the pervasiveness of homophobia and helping organizational leaders create a fair and safe environment for their members and employees. Tuaolo was Grand Marshal of the Chicago Pride Parade in 2004.

Tuaolo's autobiography, Alone in the Trenches: My Life As a Gay Man in the NFL, was released in spring 2006. It details Tuaolo's upbringing, and sheds light on how his experiences with poverty, sexuality, and football shaped him.

== See also ==
- Homosexuality in American football
