= David Denson =

American baseball player (born 1995)

- First baseman / Outfielder
- Born: January 17, 1995 (age 31); La Puente, California, U.S.
- Bats: Left Throws: Right
- Stats at Baseball Reference

David Lamont Denson (born January 17, 1995) is an American former professional baseball first baseman and outfielder. He played in Minor League Baseball (MiLB) for the Helena Brewers, affiliated with the Milwaukee Brewers. In 2015, Denson became the first active player in affiliated professional baseball to publicly come out as gay.

== Career ==
As a high school senior at South Hills High School in West Covina, California in December 2012, Denson hit a 515-foot (157 m) home run (HR) in an annual amateur home run derby. The home run broke a distance record set by Bryce Harper in 2009. Denson proceeded to win the contest with 19 home runs. A YouTube video of his record homer went viral, drawing over one million viewers.

Denson played high school baseball in 2013 for the first time since his freshman year. He was a Sierra League first-team selection after leading South Hills to a league championship while batting .446 with seven home runs, 11 doubles, two triples and 27 runs batted in (RBI).

The Milwaukee Brewers selected Denson in the 15th round of the 2013 Major League Baseball draft. He signed with Milwaukee for $100,000. Denson played for the Wisconsin Timber Rattlers of the Single-A Midwest League for most of 2014; in 68 games, he had a .243 batting average with four home runs and 29 RBI. He began the 2015 season with Wisconsin, but after batting .195 with one home run and eight RBI in 24 games, he was demoted to the Helena Brewers of the Rookie-level Pioneer League. With Helena, Denson was selected to play in the Northwest–Pioneer League All-Star Game. He was honored as the MiLB.com Top Star for the Pioneer League after hitting a pinch-hit home run while going 2-for-3 along with two RBIs and two runs scored. In late August, the Brewers promoted Denson back to Wisconsin.

After playing primarily as a first baseman through the 2015 season, Denson became an outfielder for the 2016 season. He began the 2016 season with Wisconsin, and was later promoted to the Brevard County Manatees of the High-A Florida State League. During spring training in 2017, Denson announced his retirement from professional baseball.

== Personal life ==
Denson's father, Lamont, is a former athlete. His sister, Celestine, is a professional dancer.

During the 2015 season, while playing for the Helena Brewers, a minor league team affiliated with the Milwaukee Brewers, Denson came out as gay to his teammates. In August 2015, with the help of Billy Bean, Major League Baseball's (MLB) Ambassador for Inclusion, Denson contacted the Milwaukee Journal Sentinel so that he could come out publicly. That year Denson became the first active player in affiliated professional baseball to come out to the public. He was also the second active pro baseball player to have come out. (Note: Sean Conroy was the first to come out, in June 2015, when he was playing in an independent league for the Sonoma Stompers.)

== See also ==
- List of LGBT sportspeople
