= Alissa Wykes =

American football running back

Alissa Wykes (born 1967 or 1968) is a former American football running back who played for the Philadelphia Liberty Belles of the National Women's Football Association. When she was playing, she was 5'6" tall, weighed 209 pounds, and was nicknamed "A-Train" by her teammates. She led the Liberty Belles to the inaugural NWFA championship and was named the team MVP. Previously, she played softball at Upper Moreland High School in Willow Grove, Pennsylvania.

== Biography ==
Wykes was one of the first active American athletes to publicly come out as gay when she announced that she was lesbian in an article in the December 2001/January 2002 edition of Sports Illustrated for Women. Catherine Masters, owner of the league, condemned Wykes for pursuing her own "personal agenda", claiming that the league had received "hundreds of phone calls. Gay people were saying it was horrible. Straight people were saying it was great." In 2003, Wykes participated as a panel member at the first National Gay/Lesbian Athletics Conference at MIT in Cambridge, Massachusetts. Wykes joked that she felt "great empathy for the women on my team who are straight. I mean—a straight female football player?"

== See also ==
- Women's American football
- Homosexuality in American football
