= New York City Gay Hockey Association =

The NYCGHA Crest

The New York City Gay Hockey Association (NYCGHA) is an LGBTQ sports league based in New York City.

Jeff Kagan and Jeff Minck founded the NYCGHA in 1999, after playing on the same team without either realizing the other was gay. Kagan decided to organize the league after playing with the Toronto Gay Hockey Association, just as an NYCGHA player founded a similar league in Madison, Wisconsin. The similar organization in Chicago cites the NYCGHA as its inspiration.

The NYCGHA describes its mission as providing "an environment free of harassment and discrimination for members and friends of the LGBT community to play ice hockey and fulfill their athletic aspirations." Participants need not be LGBT necessarily. About 30% of its players were straight in 2005, while 20% were lesbians. Half were straight in 2010.

Its teams participate in a multi-division league managed by Sky Rink at Chelsea Piers. The number of teams the NYCGHA varies with levels of participation. The NYCGHA had 40 players in two teams in 2000, seven teams in 2005 and five teams in 2010. Players are sorted by skill level, and the league has a reputation for developing players' skills and welcoming women.

The NYCGHA hosts and co-sponsors events to increase awareness of ice hockey in New York, gay sports in New York, and gay health issues. Since 2001, its annual Chelsea Challenge invites LGBT and LGBT-friendly players to compete in a friendly ice hockey tournament. At its 12th tournament, the Pittsburgh Tigers lost to the Louisville Llamas.

In 2008, Kagan and others protested the toleration of "anti-gay slurs" shouted by fans at Madison Square Garden hockey games. It included booing when the name of the NYCGHA appeared on display monitors. The New York Rangers began issuing warnings about offensive behavior and added security. Commenting later on homophobia in hockey, Kagan said: I think to some people, it's just a part of the game. But I think those people really need to be re-educated, and learn that what they're doing is offensive to other people that might be in the arena with them, and it's offensive to people that aren't even there."

The NYCGHA participated in an exhibition hockey game to raise funds for a production of Hockey: The Musical at the Toronto Fringe Festival.

The NYCGHA is a member of Gay Hockey International and is tax exempt pursuant to Section 501(c)(3) of the Internal Revenue Code.

== See also ==
- List of LGBT-related organizations
