= My-King Johnson =

American football player

No. 59
- Position: Defensive end
- Class: RS Freshman

Personal information
- Born: Phoenix, Arizona
- Listed height: 6 ft 4 in (1.93 m)
- Listed weight: 227 lb (103 kg)

Career information
- High school: Tempe HS (AZ)
- College: Arizona (2017–2018); New Mexico Military Institute (2019)
- Stats at ESPN

My-King Johnson is an American former college football defensive end.

== Early life ==
Johnson attended Tempe High School in Tempe, Arizona for four years.

Johnson earned four letters in football as a defensive end and also Johnson is earned three letters in track and field and rugby. Johnson is served as the football team's captain as a senior and he earned All-Conference Honors. Johnson is named First-Team All-District and First-Team All-State and District Defensive Player of the Year. Johnson had 22 sacks, 19 tackles-for-loss, two forced fumbles and 90 total tackles as a senior and he holds the school's all-time sack record.

Johnson earned three star recruit in college football by ESPN, 247sports, Rivals.com and Yahoo Sports. Johnson received a scholarship offers from Arizona, Arizona State, Oregon, UCLA, USC and Texas A&M. Johnson initially committed to attend the University of California, Los Angeles (UCLA), before changing his commitment to Arizona.

== College career ==
=== Redshirt freshman year ===
Johnson was released from the University of Arizona on May 3, 2019, for an unspecified violation of team rules. He was released with one other player. Neither team nor player specified why. He was released prior to ever playing a game as he sat out as a redshirt.

=== Sophomore year ===
Johnson announced on Twitter on August 19, 2019, that he would be playing his sophomore year 2019–2020 season for the New Mexico Military Institute. He played 7 games during the season and made 9 tackles.

== Personal life ==
Johnson is the son of Nadette Lewis. He has three sisters, Lonnie, A-Queen and Nadette Johnson. My-King's sister, Lonnie, is a track and field athlete at Abilene Christian University. His major is undecided.

He is openly gay, and he and Scott Frantz are two of the first openly gay players in the NCAA Division I Football Bowl Subdivision. However, in 2017, Johnson redshirted while Frantz became the first openly gay college football player to play in a game for an NCAA Division I Football Bowl Subdivision school. In 2014 Arizona State offensive lineman Chip Sarafin became the first openly gay player on an NCAA Division I Football Bowl Subdivision roster.

== See also ==
- Homosexuality in American football
- List of LGBT sportspeople
