= Billy Bean =

American baseball player (1964–2024)

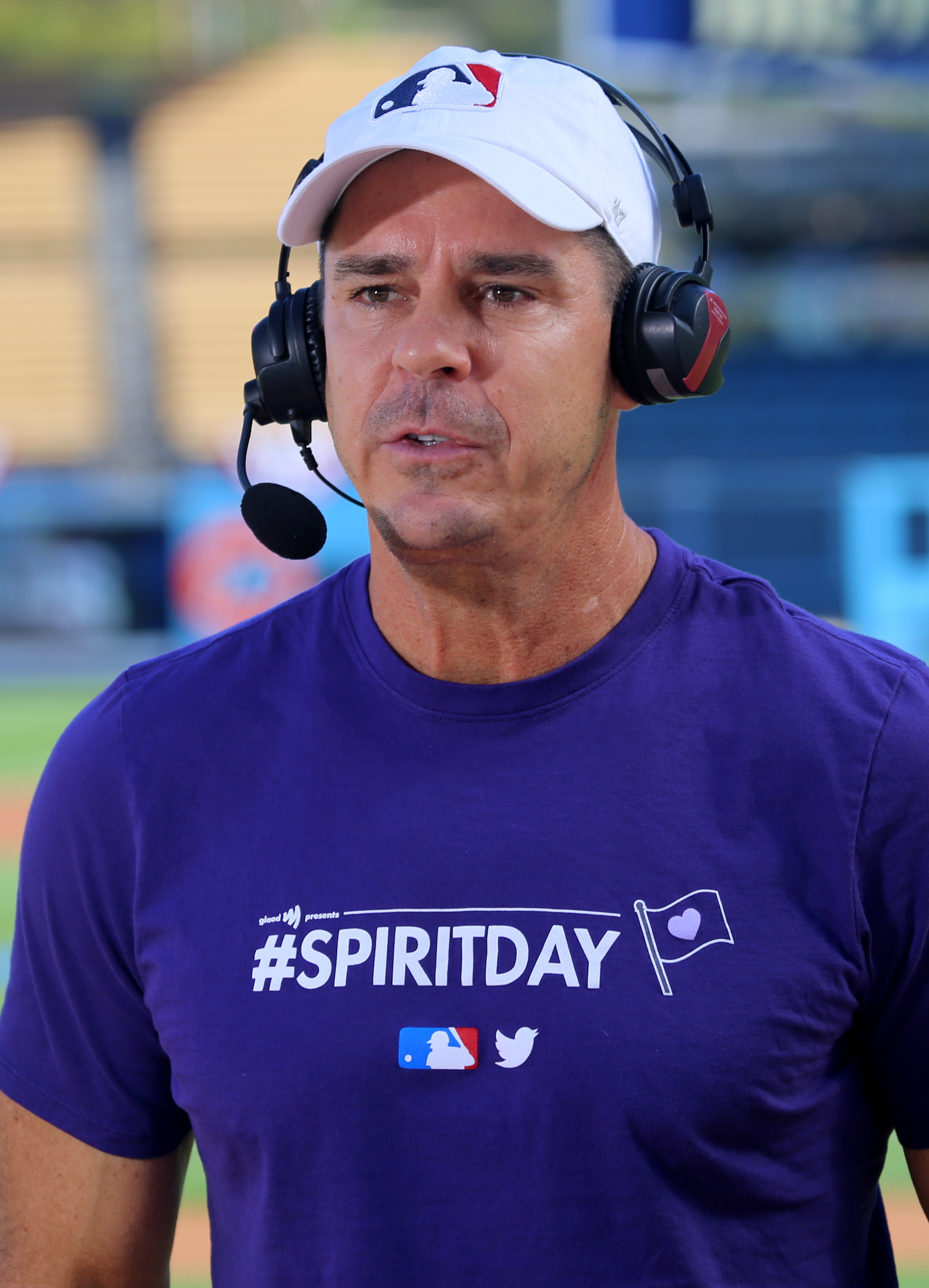
- Bean in 2016
- Outfielder
- Born: May 11, 1964; Santa Ana, California, U.S.
- Died: August 6, 2024 (aged 60); New York City, U.S.
- Batted: Left Threw: Left

Professional debut
- MLB: April 25, 1987, for the Detroit Tigers
- NPB: 1992, for the Kintetsu Buffaloes

Last appearance
- MLB: July 8, 1995, for the San Diego Padres
- NPB: 1992, for the Kintetsu Buffaloes

MLB statistics
- Batting average: .226
- Home runs: 5
- Runs batted in: 53
- Stats at Baseball Reference

Teams
- Detroit Tigers (1987–1989); Los Angeles Dodgers (1989); Kintetsu Buffaloes (1992); San Diego Padres (1993–1995)

William Daro Bean (May 11, 1964 – August 6, 2024) was an American professional baseball player. He played in Major League Baseball (MLB) as an outfielder for the Detroit Tigers (1987–1989), the Los Angeles Dodgers (1989), and the San Diego Padres (1993–1995). He also played for the Kintetsu Buffaloes of Nippon Professional Baseball (NPB) in 1992.

Bean publicly came out as gay in 1999. In July 2014, he was named MLB's first ambassador for inclusion. He later served as MLB's vice president, social responsibility and inclusion and as MLB's senior vice president for diversity, equity, and inclusion.

== Early life and education ==
Bean's father, Bill Bean, and his mother, Linda Robertson, grew up on the same street and were classmates at Santa Ana High School in Santa Ana, California. The couple married while Linda was pregnant, but then separated when Billy was six months old. Linda later married Ed Kovac, a police officer with three children. Linda initially worked as a uniformed officer, but because women could not be in the same police departments as their husbands’, she quit her job upon remarriage. Bean's extended Catholic stepfamily grew to six children. When he was a child, Bean's grandmother divorced his maternal grandfather. He had three aunts on his mother's side of the family.

Bean attended Santa Ana High School, where he graduated as valedictorian, played football under coach Tom Nice, and won a state championship with the Santa Ana Saints baseball team. He enrolled at Loyola Marymount University on an athletic scholarship to play college baseball for the Loyola Marymount Lions.

Bean was a two-time All-American outfielder at LMU. After his junior year, the New York Yankees selected Bean in the 24th round of the 1985 MLB draft. Though the Yankees offered Bean a $55,000 signing bonus, Bean was persuaded by his college coach, Dave Snow, to return to LMU for his senior year.

During the 1986 college baseball season, Bean led the Lions to a midseason #1 national ranking and a berth to the 1986 College World Series, the first (and as of 2024, only) time the school has made the College World Series.

Bean graduated from LMU with a degree in Business Administration.

== Playing career ==
During the summer of 1985, Bean played minor league baseball for the Fairbanks Goldpanners and was named Goldpanners' Player of The Year.

The Detroit Tigers selected Bean in the fourth round of the 1986 MLB draft. He signed with the Tigers for $12,500. Bean made his major league debut for the Tigers on April 25, 1987, and tied the major league record of 4 hits in his debut game. He had a total of 6 bases with two doubles and won over the fans in Tiger Stadium who were chanting his name in the later inning at-bats. He spent most of the 1988 season in the minor leagues, where he led the Toledo Mud Hens in batting average; among his teammates in Toledo was the similarly named Billy Beane. Bean played in 10 games for the Tigers after he was promoted back to the major leagues in August 1988. He played in nine games for the Tigers in the 1989 season. On July 17, 1989, the Tigers traded Bean to the Los Angeles Dodgers for minor leaguers Steve Green and Domingo Michel. He batted .197 for the Dodgers in 51 games, and was demoted to the minor leagues.

Bean played in Minor League Baseball during the 1990 and 1991 seasons. He played for the Kintetsu Buffaloes of Nippon Professional Baseball in 1992, batting .208 in seven games. Bean signed a minor league contract with the San Diego Padres before the 1993 season. He was promoted back to the major leagues. He batted .260 in 88 games for the Padres in 1993 and .215 in 84 games for the Padres in 1994. After playing for the Padres in 1995, Bean retired from baseball after the 1995 season.

== Career off the field ==
Bean was appointed MLB's first ambassador for inclusion on July 15, 2014. In this role, Bean counseled David Denson, who became the first minor league player signed to an MLB organization to come out as gay. In 2016, he was named MLB's vice president, social responsibility and inclusion. In 2022, he was named MLB's senior vice president for diversity, equity, and inclusion.

=== Television appearances ===
Bean was a panelist on GSN's I've Got a Secret revival in 2006, and was a board member of the Gay and Lesbian Athletics Foundation. He appeared in a 2009 episode of Kathy Griffin: My Life on the D-List, showing Griffin several homes.

In 2007, Bean was hired as a consultant by Scout Productions, the team of David Collins and Michael Williams, who produced Bravo's Queer Eye for the Straight Guy, for their next project with Showtime entitled The Beard. The project was to be a romantic comedy about a gay professional baseball player who enters into a relationship with a woman to survive in the sports world; Showtime did not go forward with the series.

Bean starred in an MTV episode of Made, he was an actor in an episode of the sitcom Frasier, and appeared as himself on the HBO series Arli$$ in the 2002 episode "Playing it Safe".

== Personal life ==
Reflecting on his childhood, Bean remarked, "I've always been gay. I was gay since birth, and I just knew that there was something different about me but I couldn't quite put my finger on it until I think it was 13 years old." He continued, "I always had a girlfriend from, like, the age of 14."

In 1989, Bean married Anna Maria Amato, a student at the Fashion Institute of Design and Merchandise in Los Angeles, whom Bean had been dating since 1985. The Bean-Amato wedding was held on the Bluff at Loyola and attended by 300 guests, including 20 major league baseball players.

Two years into his marriage, while playing for the Los Angeles Dodgers' Triple-A affiliate in Albuquerque, Bean met a man at a cowboy-themed gay bar. In January 1993, while Bean and his wife were visiting her parents in the Washington, DC suburbs, Bean met his future partner Sam Madani, an Iranian immigrant, in the gym showers at a Maryland health club. One week later, Amato and Bean separated and began divorce proceedings.

Bean and his new partner Madani, who was raised in Austria and France, and spoke six languages, moved into a multi-level condo with ocean views in a Del Mar, California, gated community.

Bean gave Madani a private tour of the Padres locker room at Jack Murphy Stadium, showing him the behind-the-scenes world of an MLB player. Otherwise, they kept their relationship and living arrangement secret from Bean's MLB teammates. When Bean's Padres teammates, Brad Ausmus and Trevor Hoffman, stopped by unannounced to Bean and Madani's condo, Madani had to hide in the car for approximately three hours for fear that they would be identified as a gay couple. In 1994, Bean hosted a Super Bowl party for friends and family members and introduced Madani as "just a buddy".

On April 23, 1995, Madani, who less than two months earlier had been diagnosed HIV-positive, collapsed at their home. When Bean returned home after playing in an exhibition game against the Anaheim Angels, he discovered his partner unconscious. Bean rushed Madani to the closest hospital, but changed course after recalling that he had recently appeared at the local hospital as a member of the Padres. Fearing that he would be outed, Bean drove an extra 30 minutes to a different hospital in a different direction. The next morning, Madani died of a cardiac arrest from AIDS-related complications. Bean had a baseball game at one o'clock that afternoon. Their homosexual relationship was guardedly private, and Bean did not attend Madani's public funeral.

After retiring from baseball, Bean gradually came out as gay to his parents and friends. He came out publicly to Lydia Martin of the Miami Herald in 1999, becoming the second Major League Baseball player to publicly come out as gay; Glenn Burke was the first to come out to his teammates and employers during his playing days but did not come out to the public at large until his career was over. Following Burke's death in 1995, Bean became close with Burke's family.

After leaving baseball, Bean moved to Miami Beach, Florida, for 15 years. He was in a relationship with Efrain Veiga, the founder of Yuca, a local restaurant, for 13 years, breaking up in July 2008.

In 2003, Bean released a memoir entitled Going the Other Way: Lessons from a Life In and Out of Major League Baseball.

Bean was diagnosed with acute myeloid leukemia in 2023. He died at his home in New York City on August 6, 2024, at the age of 60. At the time of his death, Bean was married to Greg Baker, a doctor, Manchester, New Hampshire native, and Boston Red Sox fan.

== Tributes ==
In 2026, the Dodgers unveiled a permanent memorial at Dodger Stadium honoring Bean and Glenn Burke.
