= Jeff Rohrer =

American football player (born 1958)

No. 50
- Position: Linebacker

Personal information
- Born: December 25, 1958 (age 67); Inglewood, California, U.S.
- Listed height: 6 ft 3 in (1.91 m)
- Listed weight: 228 lb (103 kg)

Career information
- High school: Mira Costa (Manhattan Beach, California)
- College: Yale
- NFL draft: 1982: 2nd round, 53rd overall pick

Career history
- Dallas Cowboys (1982–1989)

Awards and highlights
- All-Ivy League (1981); All-New England (1981)

Career NFL statistics
- Sacks: 7.5
- Fumble recoveries: 4
- Stats at Pro Football Reference

Jeffrey Charles Rohrer (born December 25, 1958) is an American former professional football player who was a linebacker for the Dallas Cowboys of the National Football League (NFL). He played college football for the Yale Bulldogs and was selected in the second round of the 1982 NFL draft.

== Early life ==
Rohrer attended Mira Costa High School, where he played football. He was a National Football Foundation and Hall of Fame Scholar-Athlete.

In 2014 Rohrer was inducted into Mira Costa's Distinguished Alumni Hall of Fame, in the same group of inductees as musician Jim Lindberg and scientist Lance J. Dixon.

== College career ==
Rohrer accepted a football scholarship from Yale University. As a sophomore in 1978, he was a backup defensive end. He did not attend school in 1979.

As a junior in 1980, he was moved to inside linebacker and helped his team win the Ivy League championship. He registered 110 tackles (second on the team), 54 solo tackles, 8 tackles for loss, 2 sacks and 2 forced fumbles. He suffered a fractured ankle and missed the last 3 games of the season.

As a senior in 1981, he posted 136 tackles (school record), 71 solo tackles, 4 tackles for loss, one sack and one interception, while receiving All-Ivy League and All-New England honors. The team shared the Ivy League championship, tying Dartmouth College with a 9-1 overall record, and was briefly ranked in the nation’s top 20, with three of its players selected in the 1982 NFL draft.

== Professional career ==
Rohrer was selected by the Dallas Cowboys in the second round (53rd overall) of the 1982 NFL draft, which at the time was considered a reach by the media. As a rookie, he played in 8 games on the special teams units. The next year in addition to special teams, he played on the short-yardage and goal line defenses.

In 1984, he was the backup at middle linebacker, until being moved to outside linebacker when Billy Cannon Jr. suffered a neck injury. The next year, he replaced Anthony Dickerson as the starting right outside linebacker, posting 54 tackles and 1.5 sacks.

In 1986, he registered 111 tackles (second on the team), 2 sacks, 4 forced fumbles (led the team) and one fumble recovery. In 1987, he was replaced on passing downs, but still managed 74 tackles (third on the team), 4 sacks (led the linebackers) and 2 fumble recoveries. During training camp in 1988, he was hospitalized with a bulging disc in his lower back, which required season ending surgery.

In 1989, with the arrival of head coach Jimmy Johnson, he was released before the season started, as part of a youth movement. During his time with the Cowboys, he was considered a tough and outspoken player.

== Personal life ==
On November 18, 2018, Rohrer and Joshua Ross were married. His marriage made him the first NFL player, former or current, to enter into a same-sex marriage. Rohrer was formerly married to Heather Rohrer, with whom he had two children.

== See also ==
- Homosexuality in American football
