= Brian Sims =

American politician (born 1978)

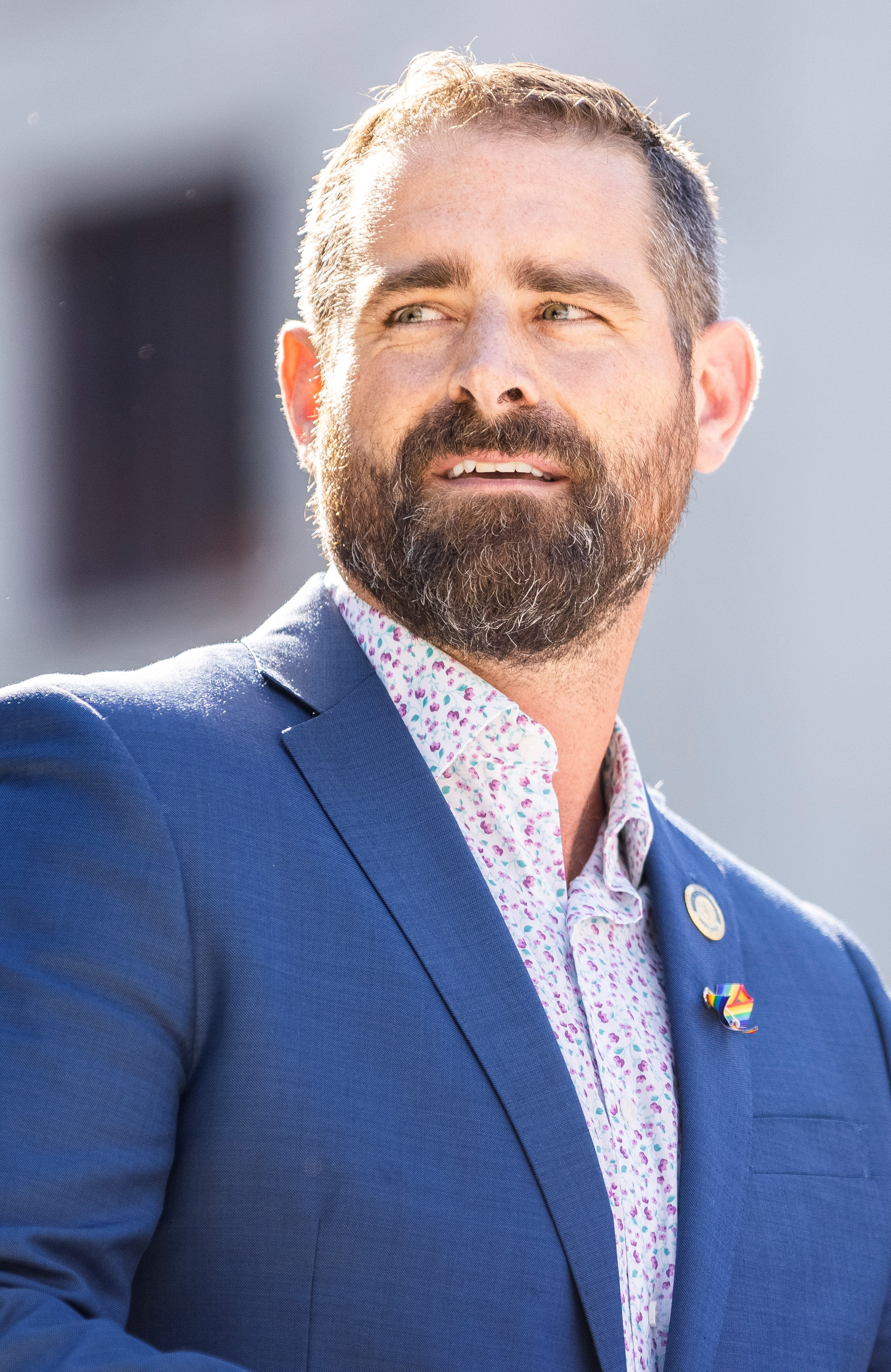
- Sims in 2021

Member of the Pennsylvania House of Representatives from the 182nd district
- In office January 1, 2013 – November 30, 2022
- Preceded by: Babette Josephs
- Succeeded by: Ben Waxman

Personal details
- Born: Brian Kendall Sims; September 16, 1978 (age 48) Washington, D.C., U.S.
- Party: Democratic
- Spouse: Alex Drakos (m. 2024)
- Education: Bloomsburg University of Pennsylvania (BS); Michigan State University (JD)

Brian Kendall Sims (born September 16, 1978) is an American politician, activist and attorney. A Democrat, he was a member of the Pennsylvania House of Representatives for the 182nd district from 2013 until 2022. Sims is also a lawyer and advocate for LGBT civil rights. Sims became the first openly gay elected state legislator in Pennsylvania history. He won re-election on November 6, 2018. He was a candidate for the Democratic nomination for lieutenant governor of Pennsylvania.

Since leaving public office in 2022, Sims served as the managing director of Government Affairs and Public Policy at Out Leadership, on the Board of Trustees of the Tyler Clementi Foundation, and as CEO of Agenda PAC.

== Early life and education ==
Sims was born in Washington, D.C., the son of two Army lieutenant colonels of Irish descent. Sims was raised in the Catholic Church but stopped attending church at the age of 16. Sims lived in seventeen states before settling in Pennsylvania in the early-1990s. He graduated from Downingtown High School in Downingtown, Pennsylvania, in 1997. He later completed his undergraduate studies at Bloomsburg University, in Bloomsburg, Pennsylvania, in 2001. In 2000, Sims was the co-captain of the Bloomsburg University football team, and was recognized as a scholar athlete. During the 2000 season, the longest season in the Division II school's history, Sims came out as gay to his teammates; he publicly told his story in 2009.

In 2004, Sims earned a Juris Doctor in international and comparative law at the Michigan State University College of Law. In 2013, Sims completed Harvard University's John F. Kennedy School of Government program for Senior Executives in State and Local Government as a David Bohnett LGBTQ Victory Institute Leadership Fellow.

== Career ==
Sims worked as the president of Equality Pennsylvania and the chairman of the Gay and Lesbian Lawyers of Philadelphia (GALLOP), until he stepped down from both positions in 2011. In 2009, Sims joined the faculty of the Center for Progressive Leadership and the National Campaign Board of the Gay & Lesbian Victory Fund. He was selected as one of the Top 40 LGBT Attorneys Under 40 in the United States by the National LGBT Bar Association in 2010.

Before assuming public office, Sims served as staff counsel for policy and planning at the Philadelphia Bar Association. During his time at the Bar Association, Sims worked with attorneys, legislators and community organizations on issues ranging from gender and pay inequity to environmental regulation.

=== Pennsylvania House of Representatives ===
==== First openly gay member ====
In 2011, Sims announced his intention to run for representative of the 182nd Legislative District in the Pennsylvania House of Representatives. Sims defeated Babette Josephs, a 28-year incumbent, in the 2012 Democratic primary. He did not face a Republican challenger in the November general election and was elected.

Sims was the first openly gay person elected to the Pennsylvania General Assembly. Although he was not sworn in until January 1, 2013, because Pennsylvania state representatives' term of service and legislative duties officially begin on the first day of December following their election, Sims shares the designation of being its first openly gay member with Rep. Mike Fleck (R–Huntingdon), who came out in a newspaper article published later that day.

In June 2013, after the Defense of Marriage Act had been ruled unconstitutional by the Supreme Court, Sims tried to make a speech in the Pennsylvania House supporting the decision, but was blocked by Daryl Metcalfe, among others, who called Sims' comments "open rebellion against God's law."

Sims made national news on October 3, 2013, when he and fellow Democratic Rep. Steve McCarter introduced legislation to legalize same-sex marriage in Pennsylvania. Sims has also introduced a bill with fellow Democratic State Representative Erin Molchany to help reduce and eliminate the gender gap in rate of pay as well as legislation to ban the practice of conversion therapy with Rep. Gerald Mullery.

Sims has also made efforts to work with federal legislators on issues of LGBT civil rights. On March 28, 2013, Sims penned an open letter to U.S. Senator and fellow Pennsylvania Democrat Bob Casey Jr. urging him to come out publicly in support of same-sex marriage. This, combined with many other calls, ultimately resulted in the senator voicing his support for the measure. Senator Pat Toomey (R-PA) also chose to vote for the Employment Non-Discrimination Act (ENDA) in the U.S. Senate after Sims and a number of other activists wrote to him on the matter.

In 2016, City & State Pennsylvania reported that Sims had failed to disclose thousands of dollars in travel reimbursements and more than $42,000 in speaking fees since his election in 2012. Sims was reported to have failed to disclose reimbursements including airfare to speak at Microsoft's corporate headquarters, a trip to Israel partially-sponsored by the Pennsylvania Jewish Coalition and the Jewish Federation of Greater Philadelphia, as well as using campaign funds to participate in a charity climb of Mt. Kilimanjaro for the Military Assistance Project among other omissions. In March 2020, the Pennsylvania State Ethics Commission cleared Sims of two violations but fined him $750 on three technical violations of the state's ethics law for failure to properly disclose all of his outside earnings.

After The New York Times tweeted a cartoon portraying U.S. President Donald Trump and Russian President Vladimir Putin as a gay couple, Sims characterized the joke as homophobic.

==== Committee and legislative work ====
On November 11, 2013, Sims teamed with Republican State Representative Bryan Cutler to introduce a bill to replace Pennsylvania's system of electing judges with a merit-based system, which did not receive debate in the PA House.

Sims served on the House Commerce, Game and Fish, Human Services, State Government, and Tourism and Recreation Committees. Sims served as Democratic Chair of the Human Services Subcommittee on Mental Health.

Sims has served as the prime sponsor of 68 bills or resolutions, of these, one bill has progressed to be debated on the house floor, and nine resolutions have been passed.

==== 2019 clinic videos ====
In spring 2019, Sims, a longtime volunteer patient escort at a Planned Parenthood health center near his home, posted videos of himself confronting anti-abortion demonstrators outside it, including one in which he offered a $100 donation to Planned Parenthood for the identities of three teenage demonstrators. The videos drew criticism, and Sims posted a response acknowledging he had been "aggressive" and saying, "I can do better, and I will do better." A proposed Republican censure resolution was not brought to a vote, and in October 2019 he sent the teenagers' family a handwritten apology.

=== 2016 re-election ===
In the 2016 Democratic primary, Sims was challenged by Lou Lanni, Marni Snyder and Ben Waxman, and won with 40.2 percent of the vote. He did not face a Republican challenger in the November 2016 general election.

=== 2022 lieutenant governor campaign ===
On February 15, 2021, Sims announced via Twitter that he was running for lieutenant governor in the 2022 election.

Josh Shapiro, the Pennsylvania Attorney General and presumptive Democratic nominee for governor, and the Pennsylvania Democratic Party endorsed State Representative Austin Davis. Seven Democratic legislative caucus leaders called on Sims to withdraw from the race. Shapiro's campaign sent Sims's campaign a cease-and-desist letter over an advertisement that it said implied a Shapiro endorsement.

Davis won the May 17, 2022 primary with 63.0 percent of the vote. Sims finished second with 25.1 percent, receiving nearly 306,000 votes.

=== 2023-present: career in public policy and non-profits ===
In December 2022, Sims became the managing director of Government Affairs and Public Policy at Out Leadership in New York City.

In August 2023, he joined the Board of Trustees of the Tyler Clementi Foundation.

In September 2024, Sims was named as CEO of Agenda PAC, an American LGBTQ political action committee.

== Electoral history ==
2012 Pennsylvania State Representative election for the 182nd district, Democratic primary
Party	Candidate	Votes	%
Democratic	Brian Sims	3,759	51.61%
Democratic	Babette Josephs	3,524	48.39%
Total votes		7,283	100%

2012 Pennsylvania State Representative election for the 182nd district
Party	Candidate	Votes	%
Democratic	Brian Sims	Unopposed	
Total votes		28,537	100%
Democratic hold			

2014 Pennsylvania State Representative election for the 182nd district, Democratic primary
Party	Candidate	Votes	%
Democratic	Brian Sims (incumbent)	Unopposed	
Total votes		6,400	100%

2014 Pennsylvania State Representative election for the 182nd district
Party	Candidate	Votes	%
Democratic	Brian Sims (incumbent)	Unopposed	
Total votes		15,808	100%
Democratic hold			

2016 Pennsylvania State Representative election for the 182nd district, Democratic primary
Party	Candidate	Votes	%
Democratic	Brian Sims (incumbent)	6,065	40.20%
Democratic	Benjamin Waxman	5,151	34.14%
Democratic	Marni Jo Snyder	2,060	13.66%
Democratic	Louis D. Lanni Jr.	1,810	12.0%
Total votes		15,086	100%

2016 Pennsylvania State Representative election for the 182nd district
Party	Candidate	Votes	%
Democratic	Brian Sims (incumbent)	Unopposed	
Total votes		31,733	100%
Democratic hold			

2018 Pennsylvania State Representative election for the 182nd district, Democratic primary
Party	Candidate	Votes	%
Democratic	Brian Sims (incumbent)	Unopposed	
Total votes		9,046	100%

2018 Pennsylvania State Representative election for the 182nd district
Party	Candidate	Votes	%	±%
Democratic	Brian Sims (incumbent)	28,234	90.56%	−9.44
Independent	James McDevitt	2,943	9.44%	N/A
Total votes		31,177	100%	N/A
Democratic hold				

2020 Pennsylvania State Representative election for the 182nd district, Democratic primary
Party	Candidate	Votes	%
Democratic	Brian Sims (incumbent)	10,285	57.97%
Democratic	Marisa Shaaban	7,457	42.03%
Total votes		17,742	100%

2020 Pennsylvania State Representative election for the 182nd district
Party	Candidate	Votes	%	±%
Democratic	Brian Sims (incumbent)	34,225	83.08%	−7.48
Republican	Andrew Murray	6,969	16.92%	N/A
Total votes		41,194	100%	N/A
Democratic hold				

2022 Pennsylvania Lieutenant Governor election, Democratic primary
Party	Candidate	Votes	%
Democratic	Austin Davis	768,141	63.00%
Democratic	Brian Sims	305,959	25.09%
Democratic	Ray Sosa	145,228	11.91%
Total votes		1,219,328	100.0%

== Personal life ==
Sims became engaged to Alex Drakos in October 2023.

== See also ==
- Equality Pennsylvania
- Homosexuality in American football
