= Center for Progressive Leadership =

- Founded: 2003
- Founder: Peter Murray
- Type: Training/Leadership
- Purpose: Political training for progressive causes
- Location: Washington D.C.
- Region served: United States
- Method: Media attention, direct-appeal campaigns

The Center for Progressive Leadership (CPL) was an American 501(c)(3) non-profit organization providing leadership training for advancing progressive political and policy change.

== Training ==
The organization offered 9-month part-time leadership development trainings for a select group of organizational leaders, future candidates, community organizers, and progressive activists in Arizona, Colorado, Michigan, Ohio, Pennsylvania and Wisconsin.

In 2012, CPL merged with Social Justice Leadership (SJL).
