= Ed Gallagher (American football, born 1957) =

American football player (1957–2005)

Edwin B. Gallagher (April 6, 1957 – May 4, 2005), better known as Ed Gallagher, was an American football player who played for the University of Pittsburgh at offensive tackle from 1977 to 1979.

On March 1, 1985, Gallagher attempted to die by suicide due to depression as he struggled to come to terms with his homosexuality. The incident occurred twelve days after his first sexual encounter with another man. Gallagher survived the suicide attempt, but was left paraplegic.

Gallagher later stated that before his attempt, "he had become unable to reconcile his image of himself as an athlete with gay urges." However, he believed that the incident also helped him: "I was more emotionally paralyzed then, than I am physically now." He went on to become an author and speak out publicly about disabilities and homosexuality, including in an interview with CBC Radio's The Inside Track for "The Last Closet", a special episode about homophobia in sports which aired in 1993. He was also the founder of the organization Alive to Thrive.

Gallagher died of a heart condition in 2005 at his home in New Rochelle, New York.

== See also ==
- Homosexuality in American football
- Homosexuality in sports
- Principle 6 campaign
