= Glenn Burke =

American baseball player (1952–1995)

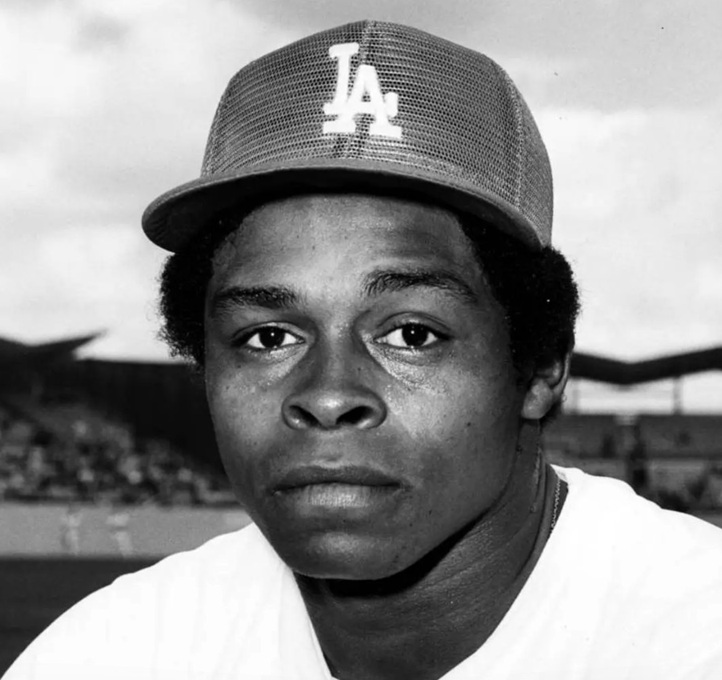
- Burke in 1976
- Outfielder
- Born: November 16, 1952; Oakland, California, U.S.
- Died: May 30, 1995 (aged 42); San Leandro, California, U.S.
- Batted: Right Threw: Right

MLB debut
- April 9, 1976, for the Los Angeles Dodgers

Last MLB appearance
- June 4, 1979, for the Oakland Athletics

MLB statistics
- Batting average: .237
- Home runs: 2
- Runs batted in: 38
- Stats at Baseball Reference

Teams
- Los Angeles Dodgers (1976–1978); Oakland Athletics (1978–1979)

Glenn Lawrence Burke (November 16, 1952 – May 30, 1995) was an American Major League Baseball (MLB) player for the Los Angeles Dodgers and Oakland Athletics from 1976 to 1979. He was the first MLB player to come out as gay, announcing it in 1982 after he retired.

Though he would eventually embrace his sexuality publicly, rumors and mistreatment due to speculation eventually proved to be an emotional, psychological, and professional burden he could no longer endure; leading to his retirement from Major League Baseball after only four years. He was, nevertheless, proud of his legacy, stating, "They can't ever say now that a gay man can't play in the majors, because I'm a gay man and I made it."

In October 1977, Burke ran onto the field to congratulate his Dodgers teammate Dusty Baker after Baker hit his 30th home run; Burke raised his hand over his head and Baker slapped it. They are widely credited with inventing the high five.

Burke kept active in sports after retiring from baseball. He competed in the 1982 Gay Olympics, now re-named Gay Games, in track, and in 1986 in basketball. He played for many years in the San Francisco Gay Softball League.

He died from AIDS-related causes in 1995. In August 2013, Burke was among the first class of inductees into the National Gay and Lesbian Sports Hall of Fame. Burke was inducted into the Baseball Reliquary's Shrine of the Eternals in 2015.

== Early athletic career ==
Burke was an accomplished high school basketball star, leading the Berkeley High School Yellow Jackets to an undefeated season and the 1970 Northern California championships. Burke could dunk a basketball with both hands, a rare feat for anyone under 6 feet tall. He was voted onto the all-tournament team at the Tournament of Champions (TOC) and received a Northern California MVP award. Burke was named Northern California's High School Basketball Player of the Year in 1970.

Burke was awarded a scholarship to the University of Nevada, Reno to play both baseball and basketball for the Wolf Pack, but transferred to the University of Denver in 1970 after just a handful of games in Reno. After only a few months in Denver, Burke realized that the cold weather didn't agree with him and he returned home to Oakland . He then enrolled in Merritt College and played on its baseball team. The Los Angeles Dodgers recruited Burke to start playing in its minor league system in 1971.

== Major League career ==
Toward the beginning of his career, an assistant coach described him as the next Willie Mays. Burke was a highly scouted star in the Los Angeles Dodgers minor league system before being called up to the major league club.

As a gay man, Burke's association with the Dodgers was difficult. According to his 1995 autobiography Out at Home, Dodgers General Manager Al Campanis offered to pay for a lavish honeymoon if Burke agreed to marry. Burke refused to do so, and is said to have responded "to a woman?" He also angered Dodgers' manager Tommy Lasorda by befriending the manager's gay son, Tommy Lasorda, Jr. Lasorda disputed that but said he did not understand Burke's behavior at the time: "Why wouldn't he come out? Why keep that inside? Glenn had a lot of talent. He could have been an outstanding basketball or baseball player. He sure was good in the clubhouse. What happened? I don't know what happened. He just wasn't happy here?" The Dodgers eventually traded Burke to the Oakland Athletics for Billy North, claiming that they needed an experienced player who "could contribute right away". The trade was unpopular with Dodgers players, with teammate Davey Lopes remarking, "He was the life of the team, on the buses, in the clubhouse, everywhere."

In Oakland, Burke received little playing time in the 1978 and 1979 seasons. Burke suffered discrimination from both other players, with some teammates avoiding showering with Burke, and from the Athletics' management. In the 2010 documentary Out: The Glenn Burke Story, Claudell Washington related how newly installed 1980 manager Billy Martin introduced Burke to the new teammates on the team by stating "Oh, by the way, this is Glenn Burke and he's a faggot." In 1980, during spring training, Burke suffered a knee injury. Billy Martin used this injury as an opportunity to consign Burke to a minor league team in Utah for the remainder of the season, ending his contract before the season ended.

In his four seasons and 225 games in the majors playing for the Dodgers and Athletics, Burke had 523 at-bats, batted .237 with two home runs, 38 RBIs and 35 stolen bases.

=== Sexuality ===
Burke said, "By 1978 I think everybody knew," and he was "sure his teammates didn't care." Former Dodgers team captain Davey Lopes said, "No one cared about his lifestyle." Burke told The New York Times, "Prejudice drove me out of baseball sooner than I should have. But I wasn't changing." He wrote in his autobiography that "prejudice just won out." Burke left professional sports at the age of 27. He told People magazine in 1994 that his "mission as a gay ballplayer was to break a stereotype" and that he thought "it worked."

=== The high five ===
On October 2, 1977, Burke ran onto the field to congratulate his Dodgers teammate Dusty Baker after Baker hit his 30th home run in the last game of the regular season. Burke raised his hand over his head as Baker jogged home from third base. Not knowing what to do about the upraised hand, Baker slapped it. They have been credited with inventing the high five, an event detailed in the ESPN 30 for 30 film The High Five directed by Michael Jacobs. The high five is now ubiquitous. After retiring from baseball, Burke used the high five with other gay residents of the Castro district of San Francisco, and it became a symbol of gay pride.

== Life after Major League Baseball and legacy ==
Burke continued his athletic endeavors after retiring from baseball. He won medals in the 100 and 200 meter sprints in the first Gay Games in 1982 and competed in the 1986 Gay Games in basketball. His jersey number at Berkeley High School was retired in his honor. Burke played for many years in the SFGSL (San Francisco Gay Softball League), playing third base for Uncle Bert's Bombers.

An article published in Inside Sports magazine in 1982 made Burke's homosexuality public knowledge. Although he remained active in amateur competitions, Burke turned to drugs to fill the void in his life when his career ended. An addiction to cocaine destroyed him both physically and financially. In 1987, his leg and foot were crushed when he was hit by a car in San Francisco. After the accident, his life went into physical and financial decline. He was arrested and jailed for drugs and lived on the streets of San Francisco for a number of years, often in the same neighborhood that once embraced him. He spent his final months with his sister in Oakland. He died on May 30, 1995, of AIDS complications at Fairmont Hospital in San Leandro, California, at age 42. He was buried in Mountain View Cemetery in Oakland, California.

When news of his battle with AIDS became public knowledge in 1994, the Oakland Athletics organization helped to support him financially. In interviews given while he was fighting AIDS, he expressed little in the way of grudges, and only one big regret – that he never had the opportunity to pursue a second professional sports career in basketball.

In 1999, Major League Baseball player Billy Bean revealed his homosexuality, only the second Major League player to do so. Unlike Burke, who came out to teammates while he was still an active player, Bean revealed himself four years after his retirement in 1995, the year Burke died. The two players are commemorated in an exhibit at Dodger Stadium that was added in 2026.

On August 2, 2013, Burke was among the first class of inductees into the National Gay and Lesbian Sports Hall of Fame. He was inducted into the Baseball Reliquary's Shrine of the Eternals in 2015.

In July 2014, Major League Baseball announced plans to honor Burke at the 2014 All-Star Game, in Minneapolis, doing so as part of a pregame press conference on July 15, 2014. The Fox broadcast in the United States did not mention Burke.

On June 17, 2015, the Oakland Athletics honored Burke as part of Athletics Pride Night. Burke's brother, Sydney, threw the ceremonial first pitch at the game. On June 4, 2021, the Athletics renamed their annual Pride Night in Burke's honor, with the first rechristened Glenn Burke Pride Night to be held a week later on June 11.

The Dollop podcast covered Burke's story on its January 9, 2017 episode.

In 2026, the Dodgers unveiled a permanent memorial at Dodger Stadium honoring Burke and Billy Bean.

Burke is one among many commemorated in the AIDS Quilt.

== Further information ==
- Burke, Glenn (1995). Out at Home: The Glenn Burke Story. Excel Pub. ISBN 0-9648158-0-X.
- Out. The Glenn Burke Story. 2010 documentary film, produced by Doug Harris, Sean Madison. 1 hour. Page Not Found » PopMatters Reviewing 'OUT: The Glenn Burke Story'
- Jennifer Frey, "A Boy of Summer's Long, Chilly Winter; Once a Promising Ballplayer, Glenn Burke Is Dying of AIDS", New York Times, October 18, 1994.
- Maraniss, Andrew (2021). Singled out : the true story of Glenn Burke. New York: Philomel Books. ISBN 9780593116722.
