= Brad Thorson =

American football player (born 1987)

Profile
- Position: Offensive lineman

Personal information
- Born: October 30, 1987 (age 39); Clinton, New Jersey, U.S.
- Listed height: 6 ft 5 in (1.96 m)
- Listed weight: 310 lb (141 kg)

Career information
- High school: Homestead High School
- College: Wisconsin (2006–2007); Kansas (2008–2010)
- NFL draft: 2011: undrafted

Career history
- Arizona Cardinals (2011)*
- * Offseason or practice squad member only
- Stats at Pro Football Reference

Brad Thorson (born October 30, 1987) is a former National Football League (NFL) player and college football player.

== Early life ==
Thorson played college football at both Wisconsin and Kansas. Thorson played for the Arizona Cardinals in 2011.
