= Derrick Gordon =

American basketball player (born 1991)

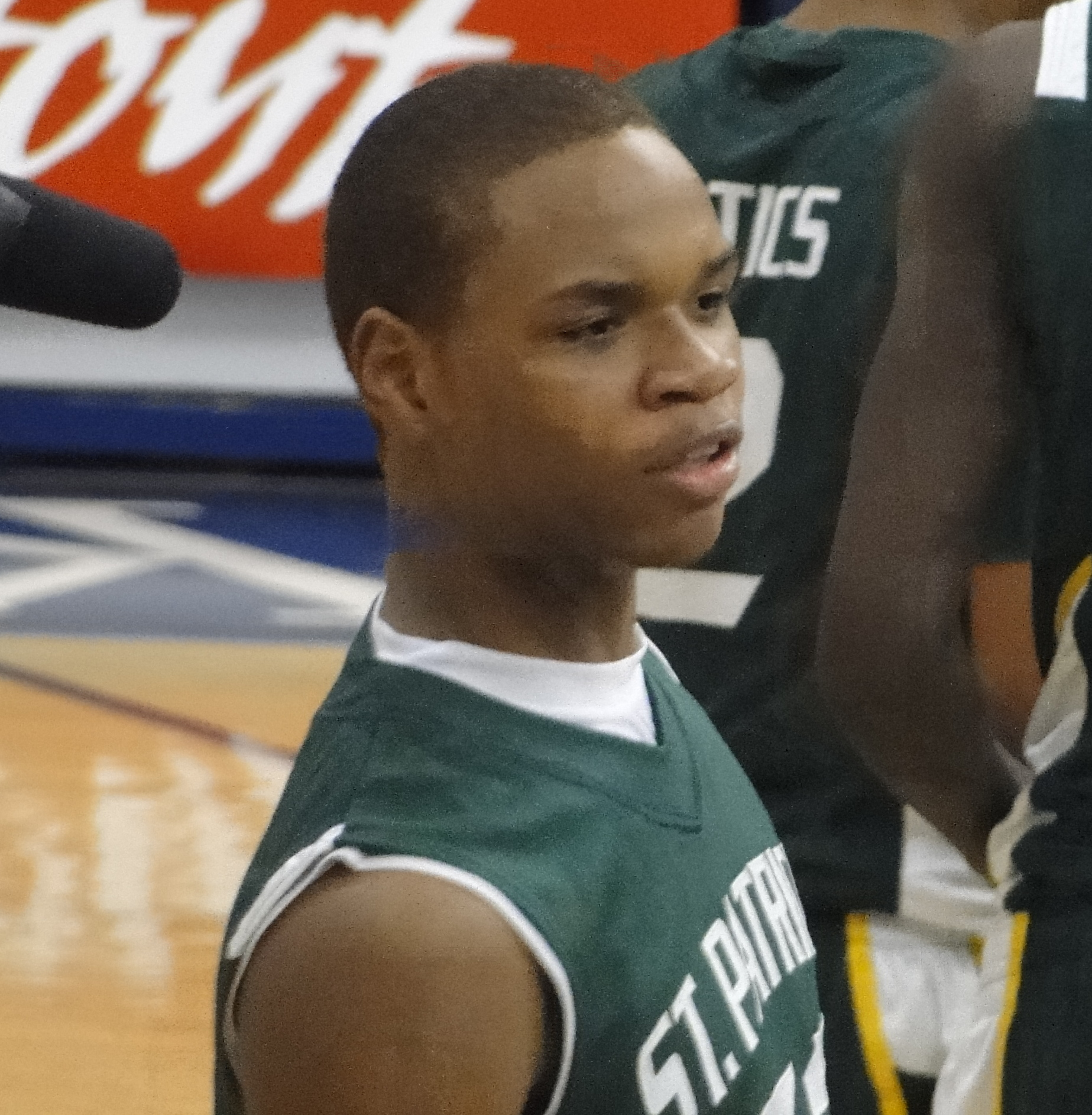
- Gordon in action with St. Patrick High School.

Personal information
- Born: December 12, 1991 (age 34) Plainfield, New Jersey, U.S.
- Listed height: 6 ft 3 in (1.91 m)
- Listed weight: 204 lb (93 kg)

Career information
- High school: St. Patrick (Elizabeth, New Jersey)
- College: Western Kentucky (2011–2012); UMass (2013–2015); Seton Hall (2015–2016)
- NBA draft: 2020: undrafted
- Playing career: 2020–2022
- Position: Shooting guard

Career history
- 2020–2021: Apollon Limassol
- 2021–2022: Gladiators Trier

Career highlights
- Third-team All-Sun Belt (2012); 2016 Big East tournament champion

Derrick Robert Gordon (born December 12, 1991) is an American former professional basketball player. A shooting guard, Gordon attended and played for three universities, originally the Western Kentucky Hilltoppers, where in 2014, Gordon became the first men's basketball player in the National Collegiate Athletic Association's Division I to come out as gay and play in a game. On March 24, 2015, Gordon announced his intention to transfer to the University of Massachusetts Amherst and continue to play college basketball, after a single season at WKU.

After two seasons at UMass, during which he graduated in May 2015, Gordon decided to transfer again, for his final year of eligibility. He was eligible to enroll at another college as a graduate student, and play immediately the following season. Gordon transferred to Seton Hall for the 2015–16 season, and, in 2016, became the first player to play in the NCAA tournament with three different teams, namely Western Kentucky, UMass, and Seton Hall.

He has also played for Apollon Limassol of the Cypriot League.

== Career ==
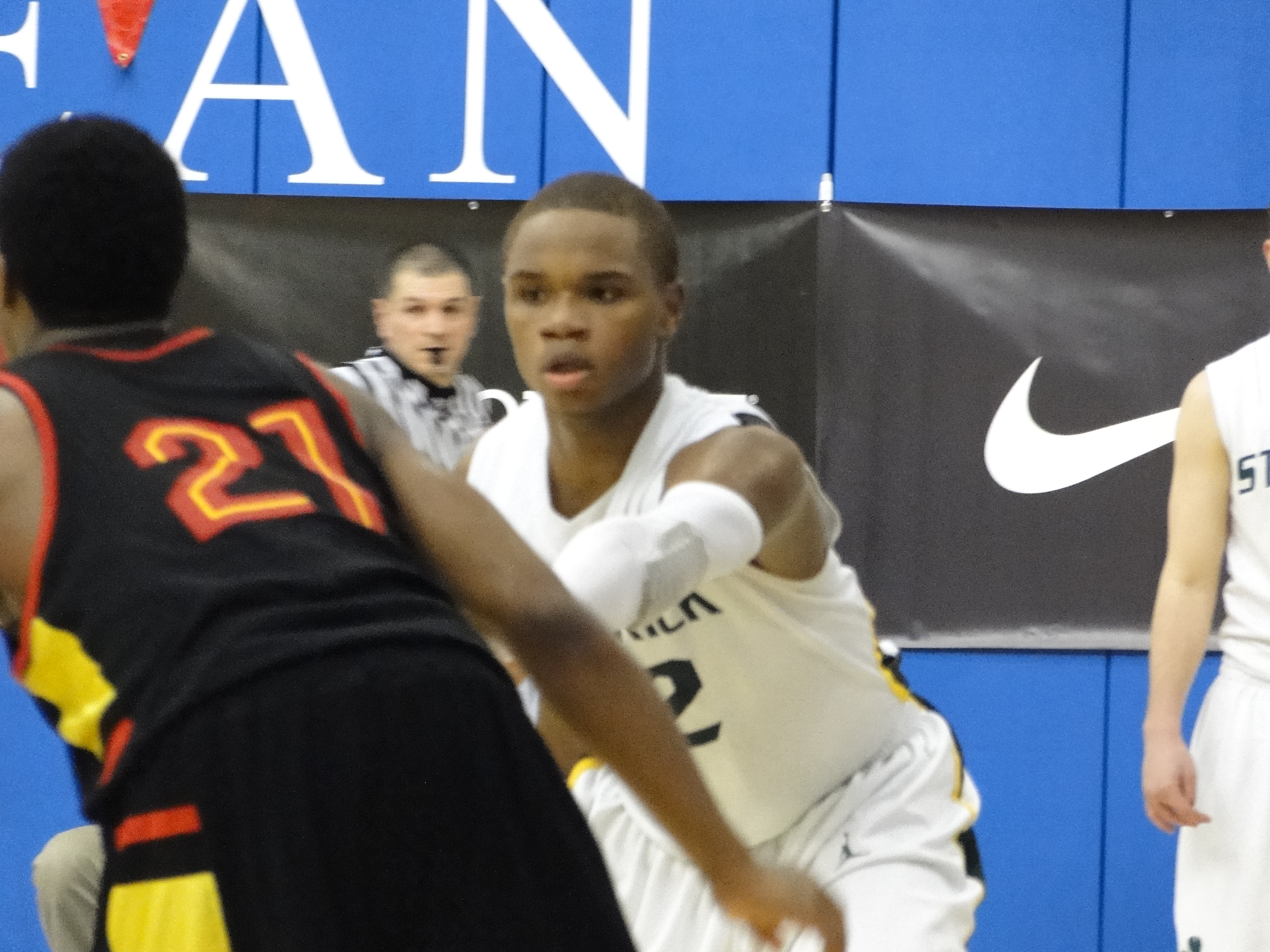
Gordon playing for St. Patrick High School

Gordon attended St. Patrick High School in Elizabeth, New Jersey, where he starred for the school's basketball team.

Upon graduating from high school, Gordon enrolled at Western Kentucky University, where he played for the Hilltoppers team during the 2011–12 season. He led WKU in scoring with 11.8 points per game. Gordon was named to the All-Sun Belt Conference third team. After the season, he decided to transfer to the University of Massachusetts (UMass), due to a change in the coaching staff at Western Kentucky, and in order to be closer to his family. Due to the NCAA's rules on transfers, he sat out the 2012–13 season.

Gordon played for UMass during the 2013–14 season. He started all of the team's 33 games. On the season, he averaged 9.4 points and 3.5 rebounds per game, scoring a season-high 22 points in a game against the Nebraska Cornhuskers. The Minutemen qualified for the NCAA tournament, but lost in the second round to the Tennessee Volunteers.

Gordon transferred to Seton Hall for the 2015–16 season after graduating from UMass. Gordon won the Big East Conference Basketball tournament as a member of the Pirates.

In July 2016, he announced that he was training to become a San Francisco firefighter. He left firefighter training after only two months and did not complete the training. In February 2017 he announced on his Facebook page that he was going to make another attempt to play basketball professionally. He hired an agent but did not receive any contract offers. As of October 2017 he resides in San Francisco and remains a free agent. In August 2017 he posted on Facebook that he was now pursuing acting and writing. He posted that he received his first acting job to play Marshawn in an upcoming movie 'Conundrum: Secrets Among Friends' to be released in late 2018. After a time with Apollon Limassol in Cyprus he played the 2021-22 season for Römerstrom Gladiators Trier in Germany. This news has been released 28 April 2021 by the local newspaper (Trierischer Volksfreund). His new coach Marco van den Berg stated that "[Gordon] is that type of leader that we so missed last season."

On March 3, 2025, Gordon announced his retirement from professional basketball.

== Personal life ==
Gordon is from Plainfield, New Jersey. He has two brothers, including a twin.

Gordon began to think he might be gay while attending middle school. In April 2014, Gordon came out to his family and teammates. He subsequently chose to come out publicly later in 2014, becoming the first openly gay men's basketball player in Division I. Gordon said "I just didn't want to hide anymore, in any way ... I've been waiting and watching for the last few months, wondering when a Division I player would come out, and finally I just said, 'Why not me?'" He further said that Jason Collins' becoming the first openly gay player in the National Basketball Association inspired him to come out. Gordon's family was mixed in their responses to his coming out. He received praise from Collins and Michael Sam, who became the first openly gay player in the National Football League. Students organized a rally in support of Gordon, occurring on April 16, which drew over 1,500 supporters. Five members of the Westboro Baptist Church were on hand to protest against Gordon. Later that year, he became the first openly gay player in Division I to play in a men's basketball game. In 2016, he became the first openly gay man to play in the March Madness tournament. As of 2020 he regularly uploads on his YouTube channel which as of January 2021 has amassed 3.5K subscribers and over 130,000+ total views.

== See also ==
- List of LGBT sportspeople
