= Ryan O'Callaghan =

American football player (born 1983)

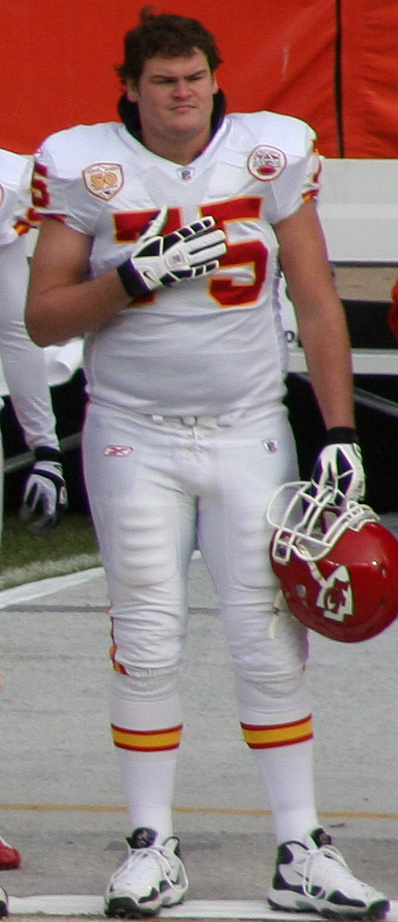
- O'Callaghan with the Kansas City Chiefs in 2010

No. 68, 75
- Position: Offensive tackle

Personal information
- Born: July 19, 1983 (age 43); Susanville, California, U.S.
- Listed height: 6 ft 7 in (2.01 m)
- Listed weight: 330 lb (150 kg)

Career information
- High school: Enterprise (Redding, California)
- College: California (2001–2005)
- NFL draft: 2006: 5th round, 136th overall pick

Career history
- New England Patriots (2006–2008); Kansas City Chiefs (2009–2011)

Awards and highlights
- Morris Trophy (2005); 2× First-team All-Pac-10 (2004, 2005)

Career NFL statistics
- Games played: 51
- Games started: 20
- Fumble recoveries: 2
- Stats at Pro Football Reference

Ryan Thomas O'Callaghan (born July 19, 1983) is an American former professional football player who was an offensive tackle in the National Football League (NFL). He played college football for the California Golden Bears and was selected by the New England Patriots in the fifth round of the 2006 NFL draft. He also played for the Kansas City Chiefs.

== Early life ==
O'Callaghan was born on July 19, 1983, in Susanville, California, to Tom and Evelyn O'Callaghan. He attended Enterprise High School in Redding, California, where he played both on the offensive and defensive lines. As a senior, O'Callaghan was listed at 6 ft 7 in (2.01 m) and 325 lb (147 kg) and earned PrepStar All-America honors after he allowed no sacks while registering 74 pancake blocks. He also competed in track and field, winning a section title in shot put as a senior. O'Callaghan committed to playing college football at the University of California, Berkeley.

== College career ==
O'Callaghan played with the California Golden Bears from 2001 to 2005, making 35 career starts. He was a two-time first-team All-Pac-10 selection and won the Morris Trophy.

== Professional career ==
Pre-draft measurables
| Height | Weight | Arm length | Hand span | 40-yard dash | 10-yard split | 20-yard split | 20-yard shuttle | Three-cone drill | Vertical jump | Broad jump | Bench press |
|---|---|---|---|---|---|---|---|---|---|---|---|
| 6 ft 6 5/8 in (2.00 m) | 344 lb (156 kg) | 33 1/8 in (0.84 m) | 9 3/4 in (0.25 m) | 5.32 s | 1.86 s | 3.10 s | 4.83 s | 7.97 s | 26.0 in (0.66 m) | 8 ft 0 in (2.44 m) | 21 reps |
All values from NFL Combine/Pro Day

=== New England Patriots ===
As a rookie, O'Callaghan started in his first NFL game against the Buffalo Bills in 2006 at right tackle. He would go on to start six games in 2006, as well as a game in 2007, filling in for injured starter Nick Kaczur. O'Callaghan missed the entire 2008 season after being placed on injured reserve with a shoulder injury on August 28. He was waived by the Patriots on September 5, 2009, during final cuts.

=== Kansas City Chiefs ===
O'Callaghan was picked up off waivers by the Kansas City Chiefs on September 6, 2009, after being released by New England the previous day. He started 12 games that year. The Chiefs re-signed O'Callaghan on April 15, 2010. He played in 11 games with one start.

== Honors and awards ==
On December 20, 2014, O'Callaghan was inducted into the Shasta County Sports Hall of Fame along with several other athletes from Shasta County, California, such as Max Burch, Sam Enochian, Jeff Foster, Ricky Ray, Megan Rapinoe, Eddie Wilson, and Mark Wilson.

== Personal life ==
O'Callaghan was raised in Redding, California. In June 2017, he came out as gay in an interview with Outsports. He shared his struggle with self-acceptance, saying that, during his playing days, he had convinced himself that no one would accept him as a gay man – and that he had decided to end his life when his football career ended. The turning point was when he came out to the Chiefs' clinical psychologist, Susan Wilson, and then later to teammates and family, who were all supportive. He now speaks openly about his struggles and coming out.

In 2019 his autobiography, My Life on the Line: How the NFL Damn Near Killed Me and Ended Up Saving My Life, was published. He started the Ryan O'Callaghan Foundation, which provides scholarships to LGBT youth.

== See also ==
- Homosexuality in American football
- List of LGBT sportspeople
