= Carl Nassib =

American football player (born 1993)

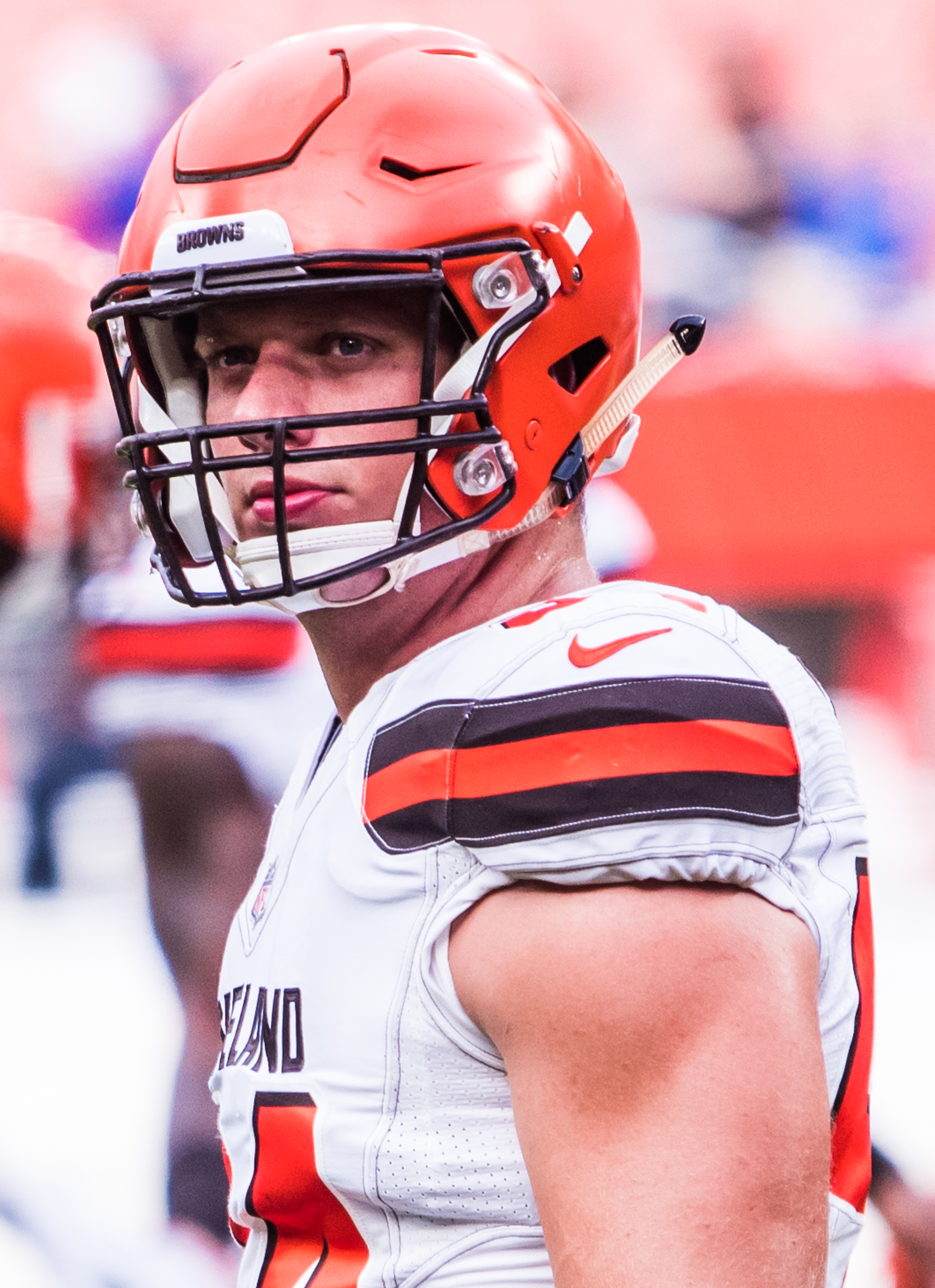
- Nassib with the Cleveland Browns in 2018

No. 93, 94
- Positions: Defensive end, linebacker

Personal information
- Born: April 12, 1993 (age 33); West Chester, Pennsylvania, U.S.
- Listed height: 6 ft 7 in (2.01 m)
- Listed weight: 275 lb (125 kg)

Career information
- High school: Malvern Prep (Malvern, Pennsylvania)
- College: Penn State (2011–2015)
- NFL draft: 2016: 3rd round, 65th overall pick

Career history
- Cleveland Browns (2016–2017); Tampa Bay Buccaneers (2018–2019); Las Vegas Raiders (2020–2021); Tampa Bay Buccaneers (2022)

Awards and highlights
- Lombardi Award (2015); Lott Trophy (2015); Ted Hendricks Award (2015); Unanimous All-American (2015); Big Ten Defensive Player of the Year (2015); First-team All-Big Ten (2015)

Career NFL statistics
- Total tackles: 187
- Sacks: 25.5
- Forced fumbles: 4
- Fumble recoveries: 2
- Pass deflections: 19
- Interceptions: 1
- Stats at Pro Football Reference

Carl Paul Nassib (born April 12, 1993) is an American former professional football player who was a defensive end and linebacker for seven seasons in the National Football League (NFL). He played college football for the Penn State Nittany Lions, earning unanimous All-American honors as a senior in 2015. Nassib was selected by the Cleveland Browns in the third round of the 2016 NFL draft. He also played for the Tampa Bay Buccaneers and Las Vegas Raiders. In 2021, Nassib became the first active NFL player to publicly come out as gay and to play in a game.

== Early life ==
Nassib was born in West Chester, Pennsylvania. He attended Malvern Preparatory School in Malvern, where he was a three-year letterman in football. He played as an offensive tackle and defensive end. He helped lead the team to a 7–4 record in his junior and senior years. Nassib also lettered twice in basketball as well as three times in track and field. As a senior, he was selected team captain in basketball, helping lead the Friars to a 24–7 record.

== College career ==
Nassib enrolled at Pennsylvania State University and joined the Nittany Lions team as a walk-on in 2011. After not playing his first two years, he played in 10 games as a sophomore in 2013, during coach Bill O'Brien's second and final season with the team. Nassib recorded 12 tackles and one sack. As a junior, he appeared in all 13 games and had seven tackles and one sack. He became a starter for the first time his senior year in 2015. Nassib reached 10 sacks in only six games to start the year.

Nassib was named a unanimous All-American and the Big Ten's Nagurski-Woodson Defensive Player of the Year for 2015. He won the Hendricks Award for the nation's top defensive end, and was also given the Lombardi Award for being the best college football lineman or linebacker. Nassib was also a finalist for several other awards, including the Bronko Nagurski Trophy, the award given to the best defensive player in the country, along with the Burlsworth Trophy given to the nation's best player who started their career as a walk-on.

== Professional career ==
Pre-draft measurables
Height	Weight	Arm length	Hand span	40-yard dash	10-yard split	20-yard split	20-yard shuttle	Three-cone drill	Vertical jump	Broad jump	Bench press
6 ft 6 7/8 in (2.00 m)	277 lb (126 kg)	34 in (0.86 m)	10 3/8 in (0.26 m)	4.84 s	1.62 s	2.77 s	4.37 s	7.27 s	28.5 in (0.72 m)	9 ft 6 in (2.90 m)	21 reps
All values from NFL Combine

=== Cleveland Browns ===
Nassib was selected by the Cleveland Browns in the third round of the 2016 NFL draft with the 65th pick. On June 28, Nassib signed a four-year contract worth about $3.2 million, with signing bonus worth approximately $890,000.

In his first game as a professional, against the Philadelphia Eagles, Nassib recorded one sack, three tackles, and one deflected pass, and earned a nomination for Pepsi NFL Rookie of the Week. He played in 14 games as a rookie and became a starter in 2017.

Nassib was waived by the Browns on September 2, 2018.

=== Tampa Bay Buccaneers (first stint) ===
On September 3, 2018, Nassib was claimed off waivers by the Tampa Bay Buccaneers. He set career highs in both sacks (6.5) and tackles for loss (12) in 2018, both higher than his career totals in both categories going into the season. In two seasons with the Buccaneers, he started 17 games and totaled 12.5 sacks.

=== Las Vegas Raiders ===
On March 27, 2020, Nassib signed a three-year, $25 million contract, including $16.75 million guaranteed, with the Las Vegas Raiders. In Week 10 of the 2020 season against the Denver Broncos, Nassib recorded his first career interception in the 37–12 win.

In the Raiders' 2021 season opener against Baltimore, broadcast on Monday Night Football, Nassib strip sacked Ravens quarterback Lamar Jackson in overtime, which Las Vegas recovered to set up the winning touchdown in a 33–27 win. In that appearance, he became the first openly gay player in NFL history to play in a game. He played in 13 games during the season with 21 tackles and 1 1/2 sacks. He became the first openly gay player in an NFL playoff game on January 15, 2022. In the offseason, he was released by the Raiders on March 17, 2022.

=== Tampa Bay Buccaneers (second stint) ===
On August 16, 2022, Nassib signed with the Buccaneers and chose 93 as his jersey number but was ultimately able to secure his original jersey number 94 that he played in starting in high school. The one-year deal was a veteran salary benefit contract for $1.05M with a $152,500 signing bonus.

Nassib announced his retirement from the NFL on September 6, 2023.

== Personal life ==
Nassib's father, Gilbert Nassib, played college football at the University of Delaware. His older brother Ryan was a quarterback at Syracuse University and played in the NFL from 2013 to 2017.

On June 21, 2021, during Pride Month, Nassib released a statement on his Instagram account stating that he is gay, becoming the first active NFL player to come out publicly. In the statement, he pledged to donate $100,000 to The Trevor Project, a crisis intervention and suicide prevention organization for LGBTQ youth, and to continue to champion their work. He received public support from the NFL, Raiders, Penn State, plus current and former athletes. That day, jerseys and T-shirts with his name were the top sellers among all NFL players at Fanatics, the league's sales partner.

In 2023, Nassib was in a relationship with Danish Olympian Søren Dahl.

In April 2024, Nassib was joined by The Trevor Project founder Peggy Rajski to announce the Cleveland Browns' second round draft pick on live TV.
