= Roy Simmons (American football) =

American football player (1956–2014)

No. 69, 60
- Position: Guard

Personal information
- Born: November 8, 1956; Savannah, Georgia, U.S.
- Died: February 20, 2014 (aged 57); Bronx, New York, U.S.
- Listed height: 6 ft 3 in (1.91 m)
- Listed weight: 264 lb (120 kg)

Career information
- High school: Beach (Savannah, Georgia)
- College: Georgia Tech
- NFL draft: 1979: 8th round, 201st overall pick

Career history
- New York Giants (1979–1981); Washington Redskins (1983); Jacksonville Bulls (1985)

Career NFL statistics
- Games played: 58
- Games started: 29
- Fumble recoveries: 3
- Stats at Pro Football Reference

Roy Franklin Simmons (November 8, 1956 – February 20, 2014) was an American professional football player who played as a guard in the National Football League (NFL) with the New York Giants and the Washington Redskins. With the Redskins he played in Super Bowl XVIII. He became the second former NFL player to come out as gay and the first to disclose that he was HIV-positive.

== Early life ==
Born in Savannah, Georgia, Simmons had five siblings. As a child, he was sexually assaulted by a male acquaintance, and he later said that he was severely affected by the trauma of that event. At Alfred E. Beach High School in Savannah, he became a highly recruited football star before committing to play at Georgia Tech. At Georgia Tech, he acquired the nickname "Sugarbear" due to his fun-loving personality. Though Simmons developed a habit of getting intoxicated and visiting bathhouses near the Georgia Tech campus, his college friends did not suspect that he was gay.

== Professional career ==
After his career at Georgia Tech, he became an eighth-round draft pick (201st overall) of the New York Giants in 1979. After signing with the team, Simmons moved his three younger brothers to New Jersey to live with him. Later, his mother and other family members moved in. Simmons was a regular on the offensive line in his rookie season, and by 1980 he started all 16 games as the left guard.

Simmons later said that he fell into problems with substance abuse during his time in the NFL. He felt that he had to keep his sexuality a secret, writing, "The N.F.L. has a reputation, and it’s not even a verbal thing — it's just known. You are gladiators; you are male; you kick butt." Simmons lost his position as a starter in 1981 and he left the Giants before the 1982 season, citing mental fatigue. After briefly working as an airport baggage handler and failing to make the Giants roster in a 1983 comeback, he was signed by the Redskins. He appeared in the 1984 Super Bowl.

Simmons appeared briefly in the United States Football League, but his professional career was over by 1985. In 1989, one of Simmons' young cousins had revealed to a girlfriend of Simmons that the former player had male lovers. Embarrassed, Simmons moved to San Francisco and disengaged from his family. He became immersed in the city's drug culture, was injured in a knife fight and became homeless at one point.

== Personal life ==
In 1992, Simmons announced that he was gay on The Phil Donahue Show. Circa 1997, he learned that he was HIV-positive. In 2006, three days before the Super Bowl, Simmons requested a media credential and two tickets to the game. The NFL denied his request, saying that it had received too many similar requests to accommodate all of them. Simmons and attorney Gloria Allred wrote to the NFL and requested an investigation into whether his request had been denied due to his sexuality or his HIV status. His autobiography, Out of Bounds, was published that year.

According to Simmons' brother Gary, the former NFL player lived alone and spent several stints in drug treatment after his playing career. Simmons was a born-again Christian, and a Christian Broadcasting Network video profile intimated that Simmons came to see homosexuality as immoral, but Simmons' brother said that Simmons was always proud to identify as a gay black man. Simmons died February 20, 2014, in his Bronx, New York apartment at the age of 57. In 2015, he was inducted into the National Gay and Lesbian Sports Hall of Fame.

In an interview in 2019, former NBA player Al Harrington revealed that Simmons was his cousin, and that as a child his goal was to grow up and play for the New York Giants just like his older cousin Roy.

== See also ==
- Homosexuality in American football
