= Conner Mertens =

American football player (born 1994/95)

Profile
- Position: Placekicker

Personal information
- Born: 1994 or 1995 (age 31–32)

Career information
- High school: Southridge (Kennewick, Washington)
- College: Willamette (2013–2018)

Awards and highlights
- Tri-City Herald All-Area football second team (2012)

Conner Mertens (born 1994 or 1995) is a former college football player who was a placekicker for the Willamette Bearcats. He was the first active college football player to publicly come out about his sexuality; he came out as bisexual.

== Early life ==
Mertens grew up in Kennewick, in Tri-Cities, Washington, where he was the youngest of four boys in his family. Growing up, he always excelled at sports. He concentrated on athletics after an incident in fifth grade in which classmates teased him for remaining in costume and makeup after a drama competition.

According to Mertens, the environment at Southridge High School was "hostile", as he was surrounded by a culture of homophobia. He said the Tri-Cities was not the most friendly area toward the LGBT community. In 2012, 63 percent of the area voted against a measure for same-sex marriage that was ultimately approved by the state. Starting with his sophomore year in high school, Mertens was active in Young Life, a national organization that preaches Christianity to youth. After being in trouble in his freshman year, he credited Young Life with turning his life around. In his senior year, Mertens was named the placekicker on the Tri-City Herald All-Area second team. He was also a four-year starter on Southridge's soccer team.

== College career ==
Mertens attended Willamette University, located in Salem, Oregon. The school's football team competes in National Collegiate Athletic Association (NCAA) Division III. Mertens redshirted and did not play football in his freshman year due to an anterior cruciate ligament (ACL) injury to his left knee from playing soccer. In January 2014, Mertens came out as bisexual, the first active college football player at any level to publicly come out. With his announcement, he was banned from working with Young Life, which he had been certain would be a part of the rest of his life; the organization's "Faith and Conduct Policies" did not allow any LGBT person to be a staff member or volunteer, though they could participate as "recipients of ministry of God's grace and mercy as expressed in Jesus Christ."

He became Willamette's kicker in 2014, when he also received limited opportunities as a punter.

== Personal life ==
Mertens is featured in Out to Win, a documentary about LGBT participation in American sports.

== See also ==
- Homosexuality in American football
- List of LGBT sportspeople
