= Scott Frantz (American football) =

American football player (born 1996)

No. 74
- Position: Offensive tackle

Personal information
- Born: June 7, 1996 (age 30); Lawrence, Kansas, U.S.
- Listed height: 6 ft 5 in (1.96 m)
- Listed weight: 303 lb (137 kg)

Career information
- High school: Free State (Lawrence, Kansas)
- College: Kansas State (2015–2019)

Awards and highlights
- Second-team All-Big-12 (2019); 2016 First Team Big 12 All-Freshman Team (Athlon); 2016 All-Bowl Team (AP, USA Today); 2016–18 First Team Academic All-Big 12
- Stats at ESPN

Scott A. Frantz (born June 7, 1996) is an American former college football player who was an offensive tackle for the Kansas State Wildcats. He earned second-team all-conference honors in the Big 12 as a senior in 2019.

Frantz attended Free State High School in Lawrence, Kansas, before committing to play at Kansas State University. In 2017, Frantz publicly came out as gay, joining My-King Johnson as two of the first openly gay players in the NCAA Division I Football Bowl Subdivision (FBS). Later that same year, Frantz became the first openly gay college football player to play in a game for an FBS school. He started 51 straight games for the Wildcats and was named second-team All-Big-12 in his senior year in 2019.

He went undrafted in the 2020 NFL draft.

== See also ==
- Homosexuality in American football
