= Chip Sarafin =

American football player

Edward "Chip" Sarafin
No. 79
- Position: Offensive lineman

Personal information
- Listed height: 6 ft 6 in (1.98 m)
- Listed weight: 325 lb (147 kg)

Career information
- High school: Highland (Gilbert, Arizona)
- College: Arizona State Sun Devils (2010–2014)
- Stats at ESPN

Edward "Chip" Sarafin is an American former football offensive lineman from Gilbert, Arizona. In 2014, he became the first openly gay active NCAA Division I player when he came out as gay.

== College career ==
Sarafin attended Arizona State University where he walked-on to the football team. His main contribution to the team was as a member of the "scout team" and he was not a regular active player.

In the August 2014 issue of Compete Magazine, he became the first active NCAA Division I player to come out publicly as gay. He had come out to teammates months before the announcement, and posted pictures with his boyfriend on social media. Head coach Todd Graham and Athletic Director Ray Anderson issued statements of support following the announcement. Sarafin cited Michael Sam, who had privately come out to teammates the previous season, as an inspiration. Sam tweeted his support of Sarafin following the announcement. The following week, Sarafin was among five walk-ons put on scholarship for the upcoming season.

== See also ==
- Homosexuality in American football
- List of LGBT sportspeople
