= Jennifer Harris (basketball) =

American basketball player

Personal information
- Born: Harrisburg, Pennsylvania, U.S.

Career information
- College: Penn State (2003–2005); James Madison (2006–2007)
- Position: Guard

Career highlights
- McDonald's All-American (2003)

Jennifer Harris is a former player of the Pennsylvania State University Lady Lions basketball team.

== High school ==
Harris played for Central Dauphin High School in Harrisburg, Pennsylvania, where she was named a WBCA All-American. She participated in the 2003 WBCA High School All-America Game where she scored two points.

== College ==
In 2006, she accused Rene Portland, the coach of the Lady Lions, of removing her from the team because of her perceived sexual orientation. Harris filed federal lawsuit against Portland, the university athletic director Timothy Curley, and the university. An internal University review found that Portland created a "hostile, intimidating, and offensive environment" based on Harris's perceived sexual orientation. Portland was fined $10,000, required to attend diversity training sessions, and placed on "zero tolerance" for future violations of the nondiscrimination policy. The lawsuit was settled under confidential terms, and described by a joint statement as "amicable." Jennifer Harris graduated from James Madison University in 2008. Due to a career ending ankle injury, she was unable to pursue her dream to play in the WNBA. The affair including testimonies by other Lions players was covered in a multiple award-winning 2009 documentary film titled Training Rules directed by Dee Mosbacher and Fawn Yacker.

=== Penn State statistics ===
Legend
GP	Games played	GS	Games started	MPG	Minutes per game
FG%	Field goal percentage	3P%	3-point field goal percentage	FT%	Free throw percentage
RPG	Rebounds per game	APG	Assists per game	SPG	Steals per game
BPG	Blocks per game	PPG	Points per game	**Bold**	Career high

Year	Team	GP	Points	FG%	3P%	FT%	RPG	APG	SPG	BPG	PPG
2003–04	Penn State	**34**	64	30.5%	8.3%	**79.4%**	1.0	0.6	0.4	0.1	1.9
2004–05	Penn State	30	**313**	**38.7%**	**32.7%**	76.3%	**2.5**	**1.4**	**1.3**	**0.4**	**10.4**
Career		64	377	37.4%	30.2%	77.4%	1.7	1.0	0.8	0.2	5.9
