= Oh the Things Mommies Do! What Could Be Better Than Having Two? =

2009 children's book by Crystal Tompkins

- Cover
- Author: Crystal Tompkins
- Illustrator: Lindsey Evans
- Language: English
- Publisher: Create Space Publishing
- Publication date: June 2009
- Media type: Print
- ISBN: 1-4421-7668-7

Oh the Things Mommies Do! What Could Be Better Than Having Two? is a 2009 children's book geared toward lesbian mothers, written by Crystal Tompkins and illustrated by Lindsey Evans.

== Press ==
The book has been featured in several publications in the United States as well as in the United Kingdom. Such publications include: Echelon Magazine, Gay UK News, and Proud Parenting Magazine among many others.
