= Same-sex parenting =

Parenting of children by same-sex couples

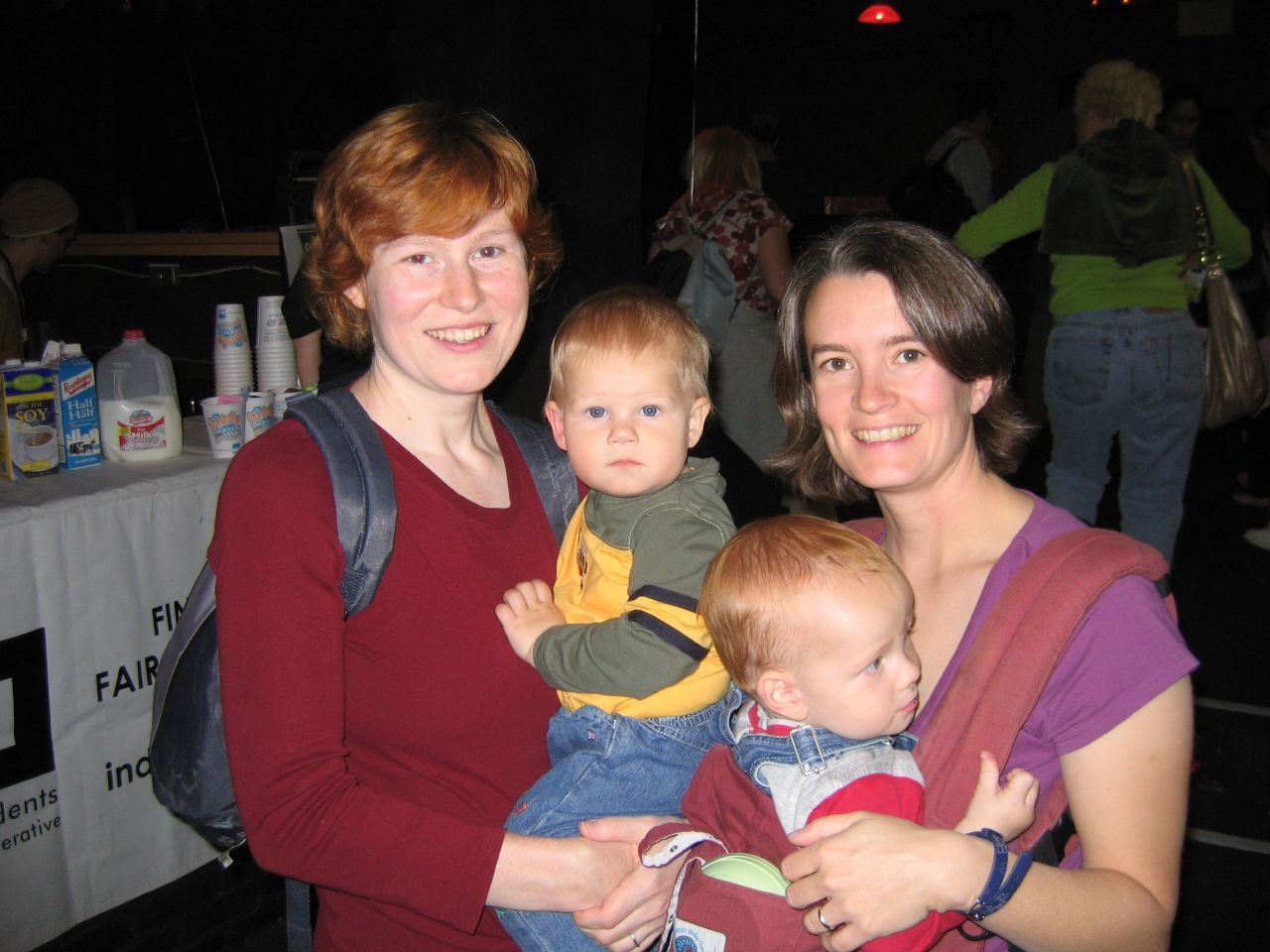
A lesbian couple with their children

Same-sex parenting is parenting of children by same-sex couples generally consisting of homosexual or bisexual people who are often in civil partnerships, domestic partnerships, civil unions, or same-sex marriages.

Opponents of same-sex parenting argue that it has an adverse impact on children. However, scientific research consistently shows that homosexual parents are as capable and fit as heterosexual parents and that children reared by homosexual parents are as psychologically healthy and well-adjusted as those reared by heterosexual parents. Major professional associations of physicians, psychologists, psychiatrists, psychoanalysts, pediatricians, therapists, and social workers have not identified credible empirical research that suggests otherwise.

== Forms ==
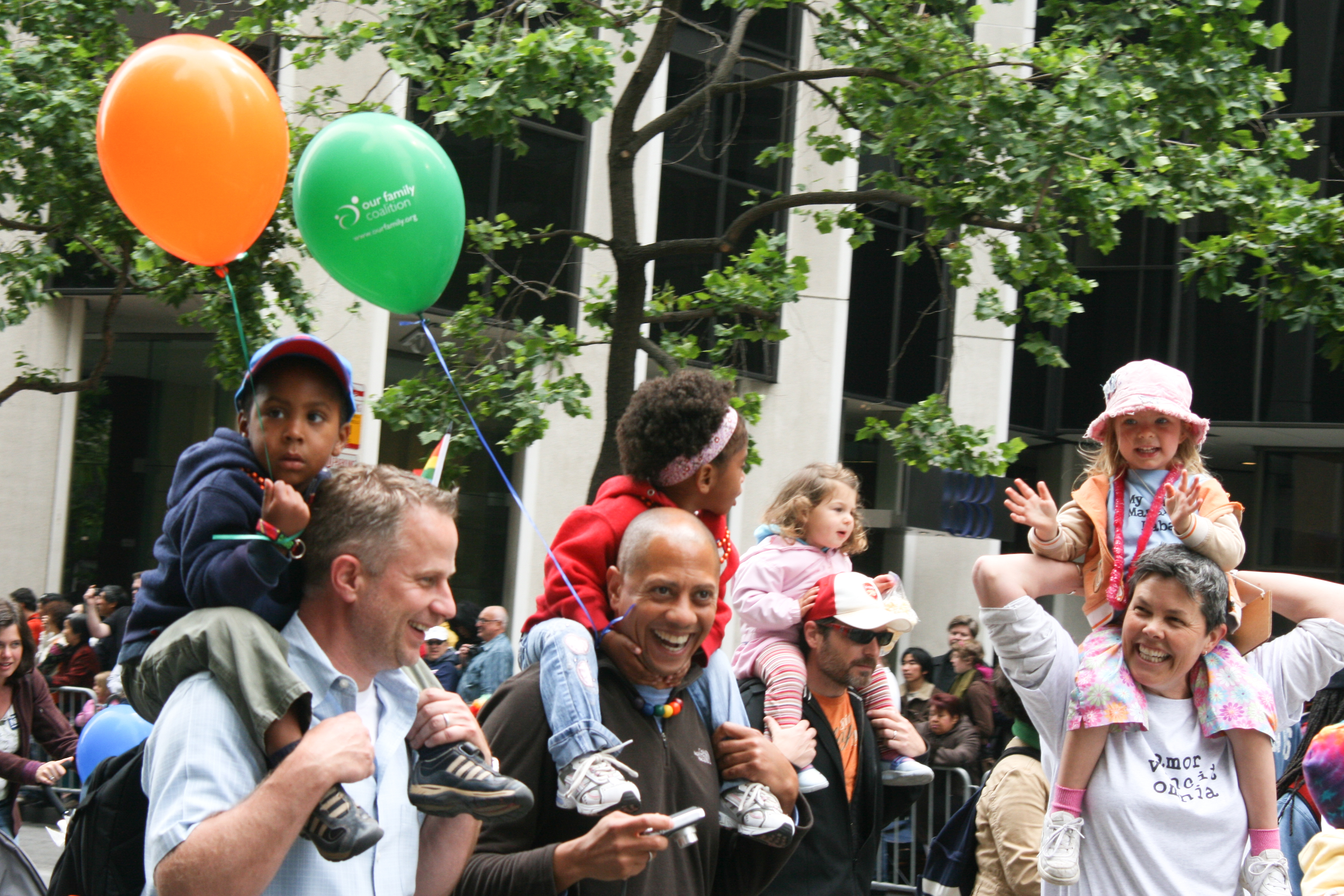
A gay couple with their children at San Francisco Pride, 2008

"Emma", an episode of the 2021 propaganda film series The Calling, released by the United States Army. The short film features a soldier recounting her childhood experience being raised by lesbian parents, and was widely criticized by conservative political and media figures.

LGBT people can become parents through various means including current or former relationships, coparenting, adoption, foster care, and the use of assisted reproductive technology such as donor insemination, reciprocal IVF, and surrogacy. A gay man, a lesbian, or a transgender person who transitions later in life may have children within an opposite-sex relationship, such as a mixed-orientation marriage, for various reasons.

Some children do not know they have an LGBT parent; coming out issues vary and some parents may never disclose to their children that they identify as LGBT. Accordingly, how children respond to their LGBT parent(s) coming out has little to do with their sexual orientation or gender identification, but rather with how either parent responds to acts of coming out; i.e. whether there is dissolution of parental partnerships or rather if parents maintain a healthy, open, and communicative relationship after coming out or during transition in the case of trans parents.

Many lesbian, gay, bisexual, and transgender people are parents. In the 2000 U.S. census, for example, 33 percent of female same-sex couple households and 22 percent of male same-sex couple households reported at least one child under the age of 18 living in the home. As of 2005, an estimated 270,313 children in the United States live in households headed by same-sex couples.

=== Adoption ===
Legal status of adoption by same-sex couples around the world: Joint adoption allowed Second-parent adoption allowed No laws allowing adoption by same-sex couples and no same-sex marriage Same-sex marriage but adoption by married same-sex couples not allowed

Joint adoption by same-sex couples is legal in 35 countries and in some sub-national territories. Some countries include Argentina, Brazil, Columbia, Sweden, and the United States. Likewise, some sub-national territories include the Cayman Islands, Mexico City, and Puebla. Furthermore, two countries (Estonia and San Marino) and one sub-national jurisdiction or dependent territory (Hong Kong) have legalized or permitted some form of step-child adoption. Step-child adoption is defined as a partner adopting the child of their partner. However, step-child adoption is not legal or recognized in some countries, including Italy.

Institutional heterosexism (defined as unequal and inequitable attitudes and actions within an institution’s – schools, hospitals, etc. – decision-making and processing) can be observed in adoption policies in many parts of the world: some countries or states explicitly prohibit adoption by openly queer individuals, including lesbian, gay or bisexual people. Other jurisdictions make decisions about whether LGBT people may adopt on a case-by-case basis, with great variability between agencies depending upon the focus of the agency (special needs children, infants, etc.), the religious affiliation of the agency if any, and the disposition of area supervisors and placement workers.

There are also legal barriers to international adoptions, since currently no countries which are actively involved in international adoption (e.g. China, Guatemala) permit adoption by openly identified lesbian and gay people. Bisexual, transgender and transsexual people are not typically explicitly named, but are presumably included in these prohibitions.

Notably, LGBT adoption rights are left to judicial decision-making. Opponents of LGBTQ adoption argue that LGBTQ individuals are not prepared to parent children and have adverse effects on children’s upbringing and growth. There are barriers present among LGBT families in the adoption process, including discrimination by agencies at every stage, stigma from social workers, birth parents, judges and attorneys, and other members of the birth family. Notably, adoption is generally the number one choice of family formation for LGBTQ individuals and the last resort for heterosexual individuals. Also, research supports that LGBTQ parents are just as capable of parenthood as heterosexual parents and are able to raise physically and emotionally healthy and well-adjusted children. There is a lot of social pressure that is connected to queer adoptive parenting, including fitting heteronormative gender roles, which is further promoted and encouraged by adoption agencies, particularly in the United States. Queer people are forced to hide or downplay their sexual orientation to fit these gender norms and appear as a more “suitable” and “legitimate” candidate for adoption. There could be a mutually beneficial relationship between adoption agencies and LGTBQ+ individuals if stigma were removed, and with that the reduction of major stressors among LGBT individuals during this anxious time. However, research supports that, "LGBTQ people should be regarded as highly valuable assets by the child welfare system and adoption agencies." Thus, adoption is a complex system.

==== Judgements ====
In 1968, California man Bill Jones became one of the first gay men to adopt a child. He later participated in the gay rights movement with Glide Memorial Church.

Sandy Schuster and Madeleine Isaacson, who met at their Pentecostal church, won America's first custody battle in favor of a lesbian couple in 1978.

In January 2008, the European Court of Human Rights ruled that an otherwise legally qualified and suitable candidate must not be excluded from adopting based on their sexual orientation.

In 2010 a Florida court declared that "reports and studies find that there are no differences in the parenting of homosexuals or the adjustment of their children", therefore "the Court is satisfied that the issue is so far beyond dispute that it would be irrational to hold otherwise".

In 2021, United States Supreme Court ruled in Fulton v. City of Philadelphia that the government of Philadelphia, Pennsylvania had violated First Amendment rights of a Catholic foster care agency by refusing to renew the agency's contract unless it agreed to certify married same-sex couples as foster parents. The Court ruled that the City's refusal due to the agency's same-sex couple policy violated the Free Exercise Clause.

=== Surrogacy ===
Some LGBTQ couples decide to have children via surrogacy. A surrogate is a person carrying an egg fertilized by sperm with the explicit intention of giving the baby to someone else to parent. Both the egg and sperm can be given by the surrogate, a donor, or one of the intended parents. Gestational carriers are a form of surrogate who carry a fetus which they do not have a genetic relationship to. One study suggests that gestational carriers have a higher success rates than carriers who use their own oocytes.

Some people become surrogates for money, others for humanitarian reasons or both. Parents who use surrogacy services can be stigmatized, and the process of surrogacy faces criticism. Stories of parents being misled about how much their surrogate was being paid have been reported, leading to questions about the ethics of monetized surrogacy.

=== Insemination ===
Insemination is a relatively non-invasive method of conception. For couples where one or both partners have a uterus and ovaries and no infertility issues, donor sperm insemination can be a first-line approach to conception. Insemination is when one partner with a uterus and ovaries is fertilized with donor sperm. Insemination may occur intravaginally at home, or as a procedure such as intrauterine insemination (IUI) in a medical facility.

Donor sperm may come from a sperm bank, from a family member, a friend, or an acquaintance. Couples who choose to conceive using sperm from a known donor may be required to draw up legal contracts with the donor outlining the parenting obligations and rights (or lack thereof) of the donor parent. In the United States, this varies on a state-by-state basis. While some states require that a donor makes their donation through a medical facility in order for their parental rights to be forfeited, others only require a clear, written agreement prior to conception.

Some people who produce sperm donate it for humanitarian reasons, others for money or both. In some countries, the donor can choose to be anonymous (for example in Spain) and in others, they cannot have their identity withheld (United Kingdom). A study on lesbian parenting experience highlights this for Greek women, saying, "In Greece, lesbians are not allowed access to in vitro fertilisation (IVF), while a solitary ('single') woman is allowed access for medical reasons."

Couples who conceive using donor insemination may experience barriers to sharing legal custody of their children. Historically, courts generally favored the genetic parent over the non-genetic parent in custody cases. However, the legalization of same-sex marriage has enabled some states to apply marriage-based paternity provisions in same-sex lesbian couples. Under these provisions, both partners are presumed to have legal parenthood over children conceived during the marriage. Alternatively, the non-gestational parent may go through second-parent adoption to become a legal parent of the child. Further, multiple courts have used doctrines such as psychological parenthood, equitable parenthood, and de facto parenthood to grant non-biological, non-adoptive parents custody of their children.

=== Reciprocal IVF ===
Reciprocal IVF, also called Co-IVF, can enable couples to share biological parenthood. Reciprocal IVF is used by couples in which at least one partner has eggs and another has a uterus. In reciprocal IVF, one partner shares their eggs. This partner undergoes hormonal stimulation and monitoring in addition to the oocyte retrieval. The gestational partner receives the embryo. This partner may also undergo hormonal treatment and monitoring, sonographic monitoring, and one or more embryo transfers.

Couples may choose their role as the oocyte provider or gestational parent depending on a number of factors, including biological reasons such as infertility and personal reasons such as desire to be pregnant. In some cases, both partners may go through the oocyte-sharing process, after which the oocytes are mixed, fertilized, and then implanted. This approach allows couples to have a biological child without knowing which partner provided the genetic contribution. In addition, couples may plan to attempt dual partner conception, in which both partners plan to eventually conceive and gestate a child. One specific type of dual partner conception involves repeating the reciprocal IVF process twice, reversing roles for each attempt, so that each partner has both a gestational and a genetic connection with their children.

Given that reciprocal IVF typically also relies on sperm donation, couples using reciprocal IVF face many of the same challenges of legal parenthood as those using donor insemination. In addition, in the United States, different states have different laws regarding the recognition of parental rights. These laws are often not equipped to ensure parental rights for both partners in the case of reciprocal IVF, given that each parent has a different biological connection to the child. Though reciprocal IVF means that both parents are biologically connected to the child (either through genetic connections or gestational connections), not every state automatically offers parental rights to both parents. Further, if parents choose to pursue second-parent adoption to ensure parental rights for both parents, it is not always clear which parent should petition to adopt their child through second-parent adoption.

=== Developing methods ===
Currently scientists conduct research on alternative types of human parenthood which can aid same-sex couples to have children. One of the possibilities is obtaining sperm from skin stem cells. This method is called in vitro gametogenesis, and it involves using adult cells and reprogramming them to function as sperm and egg cells. It has yet to be done with humans, but there have been ethical concerns raised about this method. Some are concerned from a eugenics point of view, as this method would allow people to modify the cells that they are using, giving them much more control over the genes that would be present in the offspring. However, this method would allow for parents to ensure their offspring did not have any dangerous health risks, something that could be useful to create healthy children.

== Statistics ==
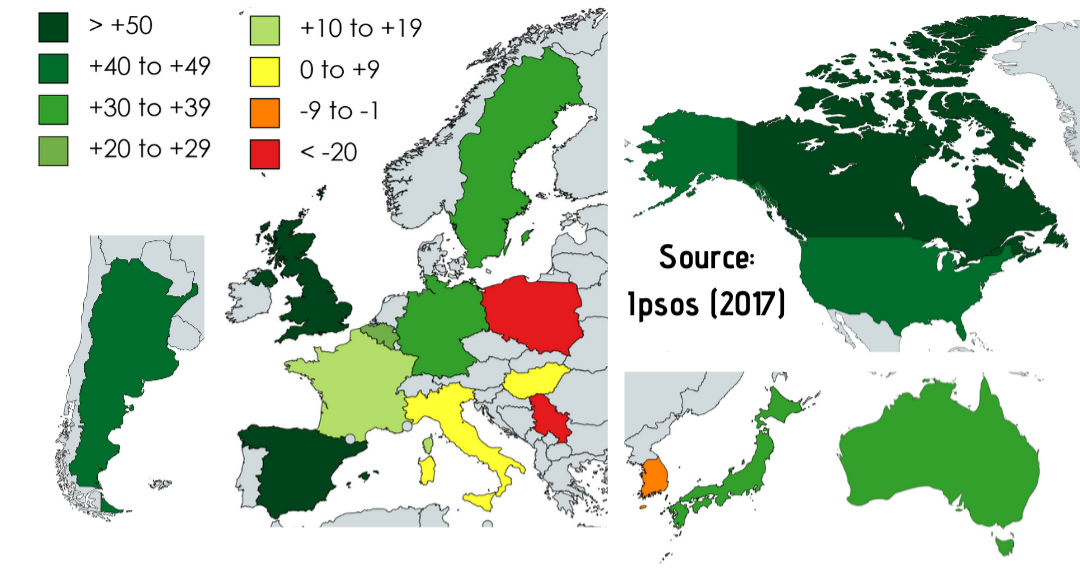
Public acceptance of legal adoption by trans people (Ipsos, 2017)

Data from the American Community Survey carried out from 2014 to 2016 estimated that 114,000 same-sex couples were raising children in the United States. The survey approximated that 24% of US female same-sex couples were raising children in comparison to 8% of US male same-sex couples. About 21% of same-sex partners had an adopted child.

According to U.S. census data, 54% of children adopted by gay male couples were boys. Among female couples, 56% were girls.

A 2014 literature review of 51 surveys of transgender people in the US found that between one quarter and one half reported being parents with more trans women being parents than trans men. In comparison, a 2015 survey of about 27,700 transgender and gender non-conforming people found that 18% reported being a parent to a child. Estimates of gay and lesbian parents in the United States have been reported to range between 2 and 8 million, while estimates of children of lesbian and gay parents range from 4 to 14 million.

An LGBT Family Building Survey compiled by Family Equality, an LGBT rights coalition, found that, in the US, in 2019:

63% of LGBTQ Millennials (aged 18-35) are considering expanding their families, either becoming parents for the first time, or by having more children

48% of LGBTQ Millennials are actively planning to grow their families, compared to 55% of non-LGBTQ Millennials, a gap that has narrowed significantly in comparison to older generations

63% of LGBTQ people planning families expect to use assisted reproductive technology, foster care, or adoption to become parents, a significant shift away from older generations of LGBTQ parents for whom the majority of children were conceived through intercourse.

A study on the empowerment of LGBT couples in Finland found there were 4 factors that contributed to higher feelings of support:

1) Parents' willingness to create socially recognized families, 2) Parenthood support, 3) Respectful partnership with all parents, and 4) Accessible services.

According to a 2013–14 survey conducted in Poland by the Institute of Psychology of the Polish Academy of Sciences (IP PAN) on 3000 LGBT people in same-sex relationships living in the country, 9% (11.7% of women and 4.6% of men) of coupled LGBT people were parents. The 2011 Canadian Census had similar conclusions to these of the Polish study: 9.4% of Canadian gay couples were bringing up children.

A literature review of LGBT families' economic wellbeing in the US states found greater food insecurity and less ability to access resources to relieve the effects of poverty among LGBTQ families because of the fear of discrimination. One suggested reason for this is that the majority of LGBT couples belong to more than one marginalized group which have lower overall incomes than people in non-marginalized communities.

== Research ==
Scientific research consistently shows that queer parents are as fit and capable as heterosexual parents, and their children are as psychologically healthy and well-adjusted as those reared by heterosexual parents. Major associations of mental health professionals in the U.S., Canada, and Australia have not identified credible empirical research that suggests otherwise.

In the United States, studies on the effect of gay and lesbian parenting on children were first conducted in the 1970s, and expanded through the 1980s in the context of increasing numbers of gay and lesbian parents seeking legal custody of their biological children.

Children and young adults with LGBT parents are uniquely defined by the fact that they typically identify as heterosexual, but as a function of their membership in an LGBT-parent family, they are exposed to minority stress and experience the effects of adulthood. Thus, a central question in this study is, How do young adults with LGBT parents explain their sense of connection to or disconnection from the LGBT community, both as children (while growing up with LGBT parents) and as young adults?

Regarding the transmission of gender roles, LGBT parents are caught between two contrasting images: "they are portrayed as either inherently different from, or essentially the same as, heterosexual families". Lesbians are either seen as a threat to heteronormativity because they are militant, anti-male feminists, or as especially safe caregivers because they are two loving, nurturing women, who are unlikely to be sexually abusive. Gay men are also caught between these two contrasting images. On one hand they do not have women’s ability to breastfeed children, are perceived as sexually (over)active and potentially predatory and, like lesbians, too political; on the other hand they are more maternal and more feminine than heterosexual men.

The underlying assumption is that gay men and lesbians are different in some essential way from heterosexual people, and this difference implicates their aberrant gender expression. Therefore, they are unable to model appropriate gender behavior to their children, for example, the assumption that gay fathers are unable to bathe their daughters or discuss puberty and menstruation.

=== Methodology ===
Studies of LGBT parenting have sometimes suffered from small and/or non-random samples and inability to implement all possible controls, due to the small LGBT parenting population and to cultural and social obstacles to identifying as an LGBT parent.

A 1993 review published in the Journal of Divorce & Remarriage identified fourteen studies addressing the effects of LGBT parenting on children. The review concluded that all of the studies lacked external validity and that therefore: "The conclusion that there are no significant differences in children reared by lesbian mothers versus heterosexual mothers is not supported by the published research database."

Fitzgerald's 1999 analysis explained some methodological difficulties:

Many of these studies suffer from similar limitations and weaknesses, with the main obstacle being the difficulty in acquiring representative, random samples on a virtually invisible population. Many lesbian and gay parents are not open about their sexual orientation due to real fears of discrimination, homophobia, and threats of losing custody of their children. Those who do participate in this type of research are usually relatively open about their homosexuality and, therefore, may bias the research towards a particular group of gay and lesbian parents.

Because of the inevitable use of convenience samples, sample sizes are usually very small and the majority of the research participants end up looking quite homogeneous—e.g. white, middle-class, urban, and well-educated. Another pattern is the wide discrepancy between the number of studies conducted with children of gay fathers and those with lesbian mothers...

Another potential factor of importance is the possibility of social desirability bias when research subjects respond in ways that present themselves and their families in the most desirable light possible. Such a phenomenon does seem possible due to the desire of this population to offset and reverse negative images and discrimination. Consequently, the findings of these studies may be patterned by self-presentation bias.

According to a 2001 review of 21 studies by Stacey and Biblarz published in American Sociological Review: "[R]esearchers lack reliable data on the number and location of lesbigay parents with children in the general population, there are no studies of child development based on random, representative samples of such families. Most studies rely on small-scale, snowball and convenience samples were drawn primarily from personal and community networks or agencies. Most research to date has been conducted on white lesbian mothers who are comparatively educated, mature, and reside in relatively progressive urban centers, most often in California or the Northeastern states."

In more recent studies, many of these issues have been resolved due to factors such as the changing social climate for LGBT people.

Herek's 2006 paper in American Psychologist stated:

The overall methodological sophistication and quality of studies in this domain have increased over the years, as would be expected for any new area of empirical inquiry. More recent research has reported data from probability and community-based convenience samples, has used more rigorous assessment techniques, and has been published in highly respected and widely cited developmental psychology journals, including Child Development and Developmental Psychology. Data are increasingly available from prospective studies. In addition, whereas early study samples consisted mainly of children originally born into heterosexual relationships that subsequently dissolved when one parent came out as gay or lesbian, recent samples are more likely to include children conceived within a same-sex relationship or adopted in infancy by a same-sex couple. Thus, they are less likely to confound the effects of having a sexual minority parent with the consequences of divorce.

A 2002 review of the literature identified 20 studies examining outcomes among children raised by gay or lesbian parents and found that these children did not systematically differ from those raised by heterosexual parents on any of the studied outcomes.

In a 2009 affidavit filed in the case Gill v. Office of Personnel Management, Michael Lamb, a professor of psychology and head of Department of Social and Developmental Psychology at Cambridge University, stated:

The methodologies used in the major studies of same-sex parenting meet the standards for research in the field of developmental psychology and psychology generally. The studies specific to same-sex parenting were published in leading journals in the field of child and adolescent development, such as Child Development, published by the Society for Research in Child Development, Developmental Psychology, published by the American Psychological Association, and The Journal of Child Psychology and Psychiatry, the flagship peer-review journals in the field of child development. Most of the studies appeared in these (or similar) rigorously peer-reviewed and highly selective journals, whose standards represent expert consensus on generally accepted social scientific standards for research on child and adolescent development. Prior to publication in these journals, these studies were required to go through a rigorous peer-review process, and as a result, they constitute the type of research that members of the respective professions consider reliable. The body of research on same-sex families is consistent with standards in the relevant fields and produces reliable conclusions."

Gartrell and Bos's 25-year longitudinal study, published 2010, was limited to mothers who sought donor insemination and who may have been more motivated than mothers in other circumstances. Gartrell and Bos note that the study's limitations included utilizing a non-random sample, and the lesbian group and control group were not matched for race or area of residence.

Michael J. Rosenfeld, associate professor of sociology at Stanford University, wrote in a 2010 study published in Demography that "[A] critique of the literature—that the sample sizes of the studies are too small to allow for statistically powerful tests—continues to be relevant." Rosenfeld's study, "the first to use large-sample nationally representative data", found that children of same-sex couples demonstrated normal outcomes in school. "The core finding here", reports the study, "offers a measure of validation for the prior, and much-debated, small-sample studies."

According to a 2005 brief by the American Psychological Association:

In summary, research on diversity among families with lesbian and gay parents and on the potential effects of such diversity on children is still sparse (Martin, 1993, 1998; Patterson, 1995b, 2000, 2001, 2004; Perrin, 2002; Stacey & Biblarz, 2001; Tasker, 1999). Data on children of parents who identify as bisexual are still not available, and information about children of non-White lesbian or gay parents is hard to find (but see Wainright et al., 2004, for a racially diverse sample)... However, the existing data are still limited, and any conclusions must be seen as tentative... It should be acknowledged that research on lesbian and gay parents and their children, though no longer new, is still limited in extent. Although studies of gay fathers and their children have been conducted (Patterson, 2004), less is known about children of gay fathers than about children of lesbian mothers. Although studies of adolescent and young adult offspring of lesbian and gay parents are available (e.g., Gershon et al., 1999; Tasker & Golombok, 1997; Wainright et al., 2004), relatively few studies have focused on the offspring of lesbian or gay parents during adolescence or adulthood.

In 2010 American Psychological Association, The California Psychological Association, The American Psychiatric Association, and the American Association for Marriage and Family Therapy stated:

Relatively few studies have directly examined gay fathers, but those that exist find that gay men are similarly fit and able parents, as compared to heterosexual men. Available empirical data do not provide a basis for assuming gay men are unsuited for parenthood. If gay parents were inherently unfit, even small studies with convenience samples would readily detect it. This has not been the case. Being raised by a single father does not appear to inherently disadvantage children's psychological wellbeing more than being raised by a single mother. Homosexuality does not constitute a pathology or deficit, and there is no theoretical reason to expect gay fathers to cause harm to their children. Thus, although more research is needed, available data place the burden of empirical proof on those who argue that having a gay father is harmful.

A significant increase in methodological rigor was achieved in a 2020 study by Deni Mazrekaj at University of Oxford, Kristof De Witte and Sofie Cabus at KU Leuven published in the American Sociological Review. The authors used administrative longitudinal data on the entire population of children born between 1998 and 2007 in the Netherlands, which was the first country to legalize same-sex marriage. They followed the educational performance of 2,971 children with same-sex parents and over a million children with different-sex parents from birth. This was the first study to address how children who were actually raised by same-sex parents from birth (instead of happening to live with a same-sex couple at some point in time) perform in school while retaining a large representative sample. The authors found that children raised by same-sex parents from birth perform better than children raised by different-sex parents in both primary and secondary education. According to the authors, a major factor explaining these results was parental socioeconomic status. Same-sex couples often have to use expensive fertility treatments and adoption procedures to have a child, meaning they tend to be wealthier, older and more educated than the typical different-sex couple. However, the study concluded that the positive effects of being raised by same-sex parents still remained after controlling for socioeconomic status, though they did lessen. The authors hypothesize that homophobic discrimination could cause same-sex parents to compensate by investing more time and energy into their children.

=== Consensus ===
Scientific research that has directly compared outcomes for children with gay and lesbian parents with outcomes for children with heterosexual parents has found that children raised by same-sex couples are as physically or psychologically healthy, capable, and successful as those raised by opposite-sex couples, despite the reality that considerable legal discrimination and inequity remain significant challenges for these families. Major associations of mental health professionals in the U.S., Canada, and Australia, have not identified credible empirical research that suggests otherwise. Sociologist Wendy Manning echoes their conclusion that "[The] studies reveal that children raised in same-sex parent families fare just as well as children raised in different-sex parent families across a wide spectrum of child well-being measures: academic performance, cognitive development, social development, psychological health, early sexual activity, and substance abuse." The range of these studies allows for conclusions to be drawn beyond any narrow spectrum of a child's well-being, and the literature further indicates that parents' financial, psychological and physical well-being is enhanced by marriage and that children benefit from being raised by two parents within a legally recognized union. There is evidence that nuclear families with homosexual parents are more egalitarian in their distribution of home and childcare activities, and thus less likely to embrace traditional gender roles. Nonetheless, the American Academy of Pediatrics reports that there are no differences in the interests and hobbies between children with homosexual versus heterosexual parents.

Since the 1970s, it has become increasingly clear that it is family processes (such as the quality of parenting, the psychosocial well-being of parents, the quality of and satisfaction with relationships within the family, and the level of co-operation and harmony between parents) that contribute to determining children's well-being and outcomes rather than family structures, per se, such as the number, gender, sexuality and cohabitation status of parents. Since the end of the 1980s, as a result, it has been well established that children and adolescents can be as well-adjusted in nontraditional settings as in traditional settings. Furthermore, whereas factors such as the number and cohabitation status of parents can and do influence relationship quality in aggregate, the same has not been demonstrated for sexuality. According to sociologist Judith Stacey of New York University, "Rarely is there as much consensus in any area of social science as in the case of gay parenting, which is why the American Academy of Pediatrics and all of the major professional organizations with expertise in child welfare have issued reports and resolutions in support of gay and lesbian parental rights". These organizations include the American Academy of Pediatrics, the American Academy of Child and Adolescent Psychiatry, the American Psychiatric Association, the American Psychological Association, the American Association for Marriage and Family Therapy, the American Psychoanalytic Association, the National Association of Social Workers, the Child Welfare League of America, the North American Council on Adoptable Children, and Canadian Psychological Association. In 2006, Gregory M. Herek stated in American Psychologist: "If gay, lesbian, or bisexual parents were inherently less capable than otherwise comparable heterosexual parents, their children would evidence problems regardless of the type of sample. This pattern clearly has not been observed. Given the consistent failures in this research literature to disprove the null hypothesis, the burden of empirical proof is on those who argue that the children of sexual minority parents fare worse than the children of heterosexual parents."

Studies and analyses include Bridget Fitzgerald's 1999 analysis of the research on gay and lesbian parenting, published in Marriage & Family Review, which found that the available studies generally concluded that "the sexual orientation of parents is not an effective or important predictor of successful childhood development" and Gregory M. Herek's 2006 analysis in American Psychologist, which said: "Despite considerable variation in the quality of their samples, research design, measurement methods, and data analysis techniques, the findings to date have been remarkably consistent. Empirical studies comparing children raised by sexual minority parents with those raised by otherwise comparable heterosexual parents have not found reliable disparities in mental health or social adjustment. Differences have not been found in parenting ability between lesbian mothers and heterosexual mothers. Studies examining gay fathers are fewer in number but do not show that gay men are any less fit or able as parents than heterosexual men." Additionally, some fear that children will inherit their parent's gender dysphoria or alternate mental health issues in the case of trans parent, yet there is research that suggests "an absence of evidence that children raised by transgendered [sic] parents have a greater chance of experiencing […] development issues than raised by non-transgender parents" and further clinical research shows that "children of gender-variant parents do not develop gender dysphoria or mental diseases" due to their parents' diagnosis with gender identity disorder A 1996 meta-analysis found "no differences on any measures between the heterosexual and homosexual parents regarding parenting styles, emotional adjustment, and sexual orientation of the child(ren)"; and a 2008 meta-analysis reached similar conclusions.

In June 2010, the results of a 25-year ongoing longitudinal study by Nanette Gartrell of the University of California and Henny Bos of the University of Amsterdam were released. Gartrell and Bos studied 78 children conceived through donor insemination and raised by lesbian mothers. Mothers were interviewed and given clinical questionnaires during pregnancy and when their children were 2, 5, 10, and 17 years of age. In the abstract of the report, the authors stated: "According to their mothers' reports, the 17-year-old daughters and sons of lesbian mothers were rated significantly higher in social, school/academic, and total competence and significantly lower in social problems, rule-breaking, aggressive, and externalizing problem behavior than their age-matched counterparts in Achenbach's normative sample of American youth."

Analysis of extensive social science literature into the question of children's psychological outcomes of being raised by same-sex parents by the Australian Institute of Family Studies in 2013 concluded that "there is now strong evidence that same-sex parented families constitute supportive environments in which to raise children" and that with regard to lesbian parenting "...clear benefits appear to exist with regard to: the quality of parenting children experience in comparison to their peers parented in heterosexual couple families; children's and young adults' greater tolerance of sexual and gender diversity; and gender flexibility displayed by children, particularly sons".

=== Sexual orientation and gender role ===
Reviews of data from studies thus far suggest that children reared by non-heterosexual parents have outcomes similar to those of children reared by heterosexual parents with respect to sexual orientation. According to the U.S. census, 80% of the children being raised by same-sex couples in the United States are their biological children. Regarding biological children of non-heterosexuals, a 2016 review led by J. Michael Bailey states "We would expect, for example, that homosexual parents should be more likely than heterosexual parents to have homosexual children on the basis of genetics alone", as there is a modest heritability to sexual orientation.

Research on twins separated at birth and large adoption studies finds that parents tend to have little to no environmental effects on their children's behavioural traits, which are instead correlated with genes shared between parent and child and the non-shared environment (environment which is unique to the child, such as random developmental noise and events, as opposed to rearing). The 2016 Bailey et al. review concludes that there "is good evidence for both genetic and nonsocial environmental influences on sexual orientation" including prenatal developmental events, but that there is better evidence for biological mechanisms relating to male sexual orientation, which appears unresponsive to socialization, saying "we would be surprised if differences in social environment contributed to differences in male sexual orientation at all." In contrast, they say that female sexual orientation may be somewhat responsive to social environment, saying "it would also be less surprising to us to discover that social environment affects female sexual orientation and related behavior, that possibility must be scientifically supported rather than assumed."

A 2013 statement from the American Academy of Child and Adolescent Psychiatry states that children of LGBT parents do not have any differences in their gender role behaviors in comparison to those observed in heterosexual family structures.

A 2005 review by Charlotte J. Patterson for the American Psychological Association found that the available data did not suggest higher rates of homosexuality among the children of lesbian or gay parents. Herek's 2006 review describes the available data on the point as limited. Stacey and Biblarz and Herek stress that the sexual orientation and gender identification of children is of limited relevance to discussions of parental fitness or policies based on the same. In a 2010 review comparing single-father families with other family types, Stacey and Biblarz state, "We know very little yet about how parents influence the development of their children's sexual identities or how these intersect with gender." When it comes to family socialization processes and "contextual effects", Stacey and Biblarz say that children with such parents are more likely to grow up in relatively more tolerant school, neighborhood, and social contexts.

=== Social challenges and support systems ===
Children may struggle with negative attitudes about their parents from the harassment they may encounter by living in society. There are many risks and challenges that can occur for children of LGBT families and their parents in North America, including those in the individual domain, family domain, and community/school domain. Hegemonic social norms can lead some children to struggle in all or several domains. Social interactions at school, extracurricular activities, and religious organizations can promote negative attitudes towards their parents and themselves based on gender and sexuality. Bias, stereotypes, micro-aggressions, harm, and violence that both students and parents can often encounter are a result of identifying outside of social normative, cis-gender, heterosexual society or having their identity used as a weapon against them.

The forms of harm and violence that LGBT young people can experience include physical harm and harassment, cyber harassment, assault, bullying, micro-aggressions and beyond. Due to the increased risk of harm experienced, children of LGBT parents and LGBT students can also experience increased levels of stress, anxiety, and self-esteem issues. Several legal and social protections support children and parents who experience transphobia and homophobia in the community, school, and family. Practicing and developing supportive networks within schools and working towards resilience skills can assist in creating safe environments for students and parents. Social supports, ally development, and positive school environments are direct ways to challenge homophobia and transphobia directed at these students and their families. Several networks and school clubs can be set up and led by student youth to create positive school environments and community environments for LGBT students and their families. Organizations such as Gay-Straight Alliance Network (GSA), American Civil Liberties Union (ACLU), and Gay, Lesbian & Straight Education Network (GLSEN) can assist in supportive school environments. Community resources for LGBT children and parents such as the Human Rights Campaign (HRC), The Trevor Project, and Parents, Families, and Friends of Lesbians and Gays (PFLAG) can assist in building personal support systems.

=== Other ===
Stephen Hicks, a reader in health and social care at the University of Salford questions the value of trying to establish that lesbian or gay parents are defective or suitable. He argues such positions are flawed because they are informed by ideologies that either oppose or support such families. In Hicks' view:

Instead of asking whether gay parenting is bad for kids, I think we should ask how contemporary discourses of sexuality maintain the very idea that lesbian and gay families are essentially different and, indeed, deficient. But, in order to ask this, I think that we need a wider range of research into lesbian and gay parenting... More work of this sort will help us to ask more complex questions about forms of parenting that continue to offer some novel and challenging approaches to family life.

=== Representation in media ===
Historically, same-sex couples have been absent, or misrepresented, in cultural representation resources such as advertisements, television shows, books, and films, since the institution of the Hays Code. The restriction has extended to same-sex parenting and queer families, whose presence was deemed unsuitable for public consumption The release of American sitcom Modern Family in 2009 represented a turning point in popular media for representation of same-sex parents. Popular entertainment media however has been criticized for the limited range of same-sex parenthood modalities and identities, as well as notions of assimilationism and homonormativity. In addition to the lack of varied cultural narratives, same-sex parents have expressed the overrepresentation of same-sex male parents and traditionally feminine same-sex female parents, and ongoing issues with visibility

In 2022, following the arrest of William and Zachary Zulock in Walton County, Georgia, United States, right-wing political commentators, including Laura Ingraham, Charlie Kirk, and Matt Walsh, took the case to unfoundedly link same-sex adoption to the Zulocks's crimes. Ingraham interviewed Mia Cathell, who wrote an extensive multipart report about the case for the right-wing website Townhall, with Cathell saying that the problem that the story show(ed) was that "a same-sex couple was able to receive services" from an adoption agency. A similar statement was made by Argentine President Javier Milei at the 2025 World Economic Forum in Davos, who took the Zulocks as an example to attack gay men and the LGBTQ+ community, sparking condemnation from Argentine media.

=== Misrepresentation by opponents ===
In a 2006 statement, the Canadian Psychological Association released an updated statement on their 2003 and 2005 conclusions, saying, "The CPA recognizes and appreciates that persons and institutions are entitled to their opinions and positions on this issue. However, CPA is concerned that some persons and institutions are misinterpreting the findings of psychological research to support their positions when their positions are more accurately based on other systems of belief or values." Several professional organizations have noted that studies which opponents of LGBT parenting claim as evidence that same-sex couples are unfit parents do not in fact address same-sex parenting, however, and therefore do not permit any conclusions to be drawn about the effects of the sexes or sexual orientations of parents. Rather, these studies, which only sampled heterosexual parents, found that it was better for children to be raised by two parents instead of one, and/or that the divorce or death of a parent had a negative effect on children. In Perry v. Brown, Judge Vaughn Walker found that the available studies on stepchildren, which opponents of same-sex marriage cited to support their position that it is best for a child to be raised by its biological mother and father, do not isolate "the genetic relationship between a parent and a child as a variable to be tested" and only compare "children raised by married, biological parents with children raised by single parents, unmarried mothers, step families and cohabiting parents", and thus "compare various family structures and do not emphasize biology". Perry also cited studies showing that "adopted children or children conceived using sperm or egg donors are just as likely to be well-adjusted as children raised by their biological parents."

Gregory M. Herek noted in 2006 that "empirical research can't reconcile disputes about core values, but it is very good at addressing questions of fact. Policy debates will be impoverished if this important source of knowledge is simply dismissed as a 'he said, she said' squabble."

== See also ==
Social

- Coparenting
- LGBT reproduction
- LGBT adoption
- LGBT adoption in Europe
- LGBT youth vulnerability
- Marriage promotion
- Same-sex marriage and the family
- Surrogacy
- Third party reproduction

Medical:

- Artificial insemination
- Assisted reproductive technology
- In vitro fertilisation
- Shared parenting
- Sperm donation
- Parenting

Publications

- Oh the Things Mommies Do! What Could Be Better Than Having Two?, a 2009 children's book

Research:

- New Family Structures Study: Published by Mark Regnerus in 2012, this study was widely discredited by researchers, and which claimed to show that children of gay and lesbian parents were adversely affected by their upbringing by parents in same-sex relationships.
- Homosexual parenting in animals
