= Same-sex marriage and the family =

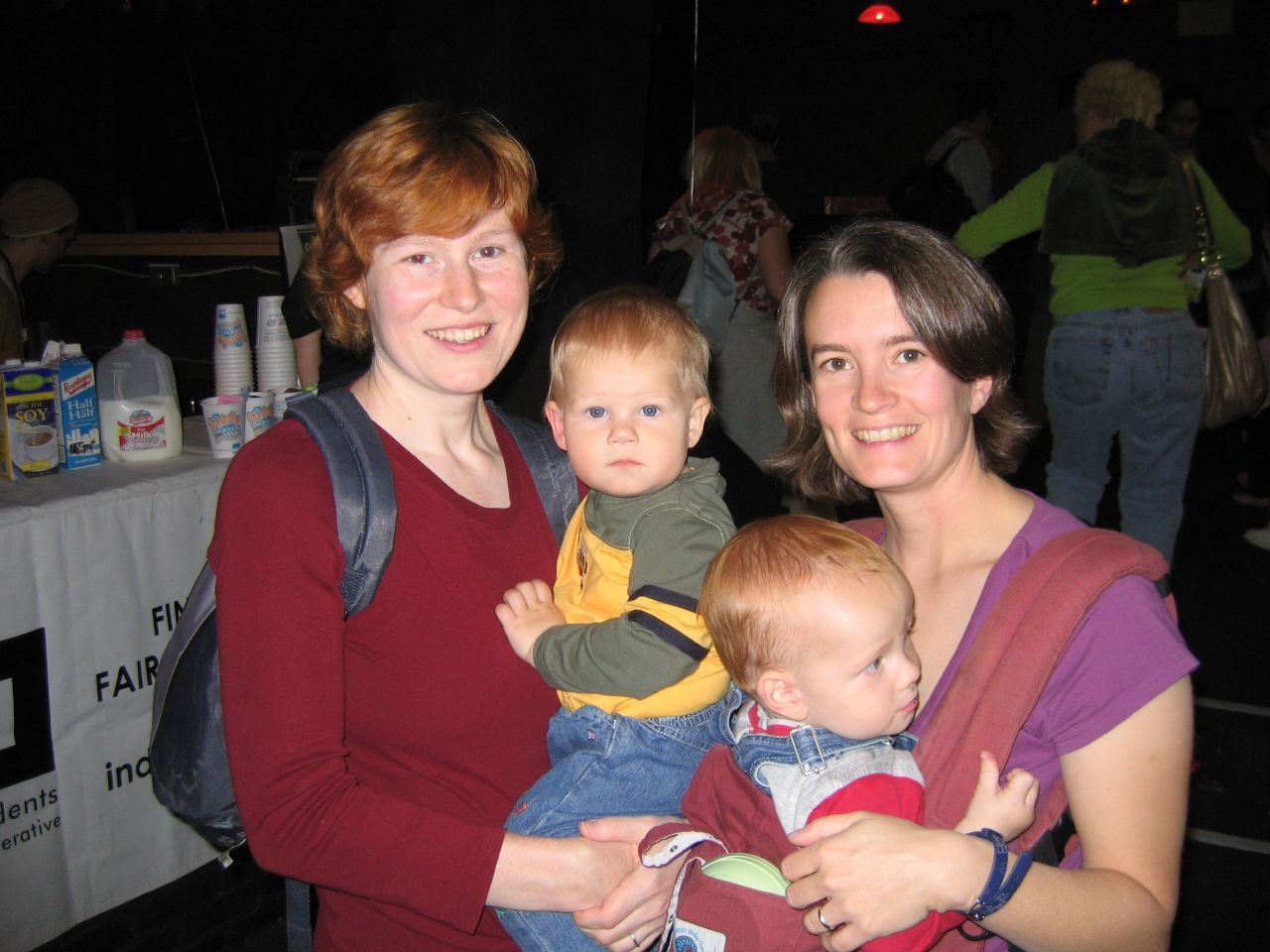
Lesbian couple with children

Concerns regarding same-sex marriage and the family are at the forefront of the controversies over legalization of same-sex marriage. In the United States, about 292,000 children are being raised in the households of same-sex couples. Concern for these children and others to come are the basis for both opposition to and support for marriage for LGBTQ couples.

== Research and positions of professional scientific organizations ==
Scientific research has been consistent in showing that lesbian and gay parents are as fit and capable as heterosexual parents, and their children are as psychologically healthy and well-adjusted as children reared by heterosexual parents. According to scientific literature reviews published in prestigious peer-reviewed journals and statements of mainstream professional associations, there is no evidence to the contrary. The American Psychological Association reports that some studies suggest parenting skills of gays and lesbians might be "superior." Biblarz and Stacey state that while research has found that families headed by (at least) two parents are generally best for children, outcomes of more than two parents (as in some cooperative stepfamilies, intergenerational families, and coparenting alliances among lesbians and gay men) have not yet been studied.

=== United States ===
As noted by Professor Judith Stacey of New York University: “Rarely is there as much consensus in any area of social science as in the case of gay parenting, which is why the American Academy of Pediatrics and all of the major professional organizations with expertise in child welfare have issued reports and resolutions in support of gay and lesbian parental rights”. Among these mainstream organizations in the United States are the American Psychiatric Association, the National Association of Social Workers, Child Welfare League of America, the American Bar Association, the North American Council on Adoptable Children, the American Academy of Pediatrics, the American Psychoanalytic Association and the American Academy of Family Physicians.

In 2013, the American Academy of Pediatrics stated in Pediatrics:

On the basis of this comprehensive review of the literature regarding the development and adjustment of children whose parents are the same gender, as well as the existing evidence for the legal, social, and health benefits of marriage to children, the AAP concludes that it is in the best interests of children that they be able to partake in the security of permanent nurturing and care that comes with the civil marriage of their parents, without regard to their parents’ gender or sexual orientation.

In 2006, the American Psychological Association, American Psychiatric Association and National Association of Social Workers stated in an amicus brief presented to the Supreme Court of the State of California:

Although it is sometimes asserted in policy debates that heterosexual couples are inherently better parents than same-sex couples, or that the children of lesbian or gay parents fare worse than children raised by heterosexual parents, those assertions find no support in the scientific research literature. When comparing the outcomes of different forms of parenting, it is critically important to make appropriate comparisons. For example, differences resulting from the number of parents in a household cannot be attributed to the parents’ gender or sexual orientation. Research in households with heterosexual parents generally indicates that – all else being equal – children do better with two parenting figures rather than just one. The specific research studies typically cited in this regard do not address parents’ sexual orientation, however, and therefore do not permit any conclusions to be drawn about the consequences of having heterosexual versus nonheterosexual parents, or two parents who are of the same versus different genders. Indeed, the scientific research that has directly compared outcomes for children with gay and lesbian parents with outcomes for children with heterosexual parents has been remarkably consistent in showing that lesbian and gay parents are every bit as fit and capable as heterosexual parents, and their children are as psychologically healthy and well-adjusted as children reared by heterosexual parents. Amici emphasize that the abilities of gay and lesbian persons as parents and the positive outcomes for their children are not areas where credible scientific researchers disagree. Statements by the leading associations of experts in this area reflect professional consensus that children raised by lesbian or gay parents do not differ in any important respects from those raised by heterosexual parents. No credible empirical research suggests otherwise. Allowing same-sex couples to legally marry will not have any detrimental effect on children raised in heterosexual households, but it will benefit children being raised by same-sex couples.

Peer-reviewed studies indicate that no research supports the widely held conviction that the gender of parents matters for child well-being. The methodologies used in the major studies of same-sex parenting meet the standards for research in the field of developmental psychology and psychology generally and are considered reliable by members of the respective professions. A roundup of related research on Journalist's Resource, a project of the Joan Shorenstein Center on the Press, Politics and Public Policy at Harvard's John F. Kennedy School of Government, found few if any downsides to children being raised by a same-sex couple, and some positive effects.

=== Canada ===
The Canadian Psychological Association stated in 2004 and 2006:

Beliefs that gay and lesbian adults are not fit parents, or that the psychosocial development of the children of gay and lesbian parents is compromised, have no basis in science. Our position is based on a review representing approximately 50 empirical studies and at least another 50 articles and book chapters and does not rest on the results of any one study. A review of the psychological research into the well-being of children raised by same-sex and opposite-sex parents continues to indicate that there are no reliable differences in their mental health or social adjustment and that lesbian mothers and gay fathers are not less fit as parents than are their heterosexual counterparts. The opposition to marriage of same-sex couples, on the grounds that it fails to consider the needs

or rights of children, does not consider the most relevant body of psychological research into this topic or draws inaccurate conclusions from it. Further, opposition to marriage of same-sex couples often incorrectly pre-supposes that, by preventing marriage of same-sex couples, no children will be born or raised within families where parents are of the same sex. Such as argument ignores the reality that children are, and will continue to be, born to and raised by parents who are married, those who are unmarried, those who are cohabitating, and those who are single – most of whom will be heterosexual, some of whom will be gay, and some of whom will be lesbian. Further, the literature (including the literature on which opponents to marriage of same-sex couples appear to rely) indicates that parents’ financial, psychological and physical well-being is enhanced by marriage and that children benefit from being raised by two parents within a legally-recognized union. As the CPA stated in 2003, the stressors encountered by gay and lesbian parents and their children are more likely the result of the way in which society treats them than because of any

deficiencies in fitness to parent. The CPA recognizes and appreciates that persons and institutions are entitled to their opinions and positions on this issue. However, CPA is concerned that some are mis-interpreting the findings of psychological research to support their positions, when their positions are more accurately based on other systems of belief or values.

=== Australia ===
In 2007, the Australian Psychological Society stated: "The family studies literature indicates that it is family processes (such as the quality of parenting and relationships within the family) that contribute to determining children’s wellbeing and ‘outcomes’, rather than family structures, per se, such as the number, gender, sexuality and co-habitation status of parents. The research indicates that parenting practices and children's outcomes in families parented by lesbian and gay parents are likely to be at least as favourable as those in families of heterosexual parents, despite the reality that considerable legal discrimination and inequity remain significant challenges for these families. The main reason given (by lawmakers) for not allowing people to marry the person of their choice if that person is of the same gender has been the inaccurate assertion that this is in the best interest of children, and that children ‘need’ or ‘do better’ in a family with one parent of each gender. As the reviews, statements, and recommendations written by multiple expert and professional bodies indicate, this assertion is not supported by the family studies research, and in fact, the promotion of this notion, and the laws and public policies that embody it, are counter to the well-being of children."

Many states and territories with the exception of Northern and Western Australia have laws that allow couples to register their domestic relationships, which is called de facto relationship. There is a concern regarding the rights accorded to family members in this type of relationship. The reason for this is that there is currently no Australian law covering the rights of these families except for a few domestic partner employment benefits. Families also do not have access to a set of benefits and mechanisms provided to married couples. For instance, same-sex couples usually face the burden of proof complexities required by institutions in order to avail of their services and this complicates the lives of members in cases of interpersonal or family conflict, affecting their psychological well-being. This is demonstrated in the case of being considered a legal parent for two women who used in vitro fertilization (IVF) to have a child. The biological parent is the legal parent whereas the other need to undergo the ordeal of having to prove the existence of a relationship with the mother of the child.

There are also reports that the current debate on same-sex marriage results in the increasing discrimination against lesbian, gay, bisexual, transgender, intersex, and queer (LGBTIQ) people. In a statement by the National Mental Health Commission, it was stated that “LGBTIQ people have experienced damaging behaviour in their workplaces, communities and in social and traditional media" and that it is "alarmed about potential negative health impacts these debates are having on individuals, couples and families who face scrutiny and judgment.”

== In U.S. federal and state law ==
In Anderson et al. v. King County, a case that challenged Washington's Defense of Marriage Act, the Washington Supreme Court ruled 5 to 4 that the law survive constitutional review. The majority concluded that the legislature had rational basis, that is, it was entitled to believe, and to act on such belief, that only allowing opposite-sex marriages "furthers procreation". In response, a group of same-sex marriage advocates filed what became Initiative 957 which, if passed, would have made procreation a legal requirement for marriage in Washington State. The Maryland Supreme Court used similar grounds to rule that it was permissible to confer the benefits of marriage only on opposite-sex couples.

In 1996, Congress passed the Defense of Marriage Act that defines marriage in Federal law as "a legal union between one man and one woman as husband and wife". Congressional record, a House Report (H.R. 104–664 at 33, 104th Congress, 2nd Session, 1996), states that procreation is key to the requirement of a valid marriage being a union and of one man and one woman.

It has been suggested that Congress acted in anticipation to legal challenges based on the Defense of Marriage Act that might rely on a dicta made in a 1965 Supreme Court ruling, Griswold v. Connecticut (381 U.S. 479) procreation is not essential to marriage:

Marriage is a coming together for better or for worse, hopefully enduring, and intimate to the degree of being sacred. It is an association that promotes a way of life, not causes; a harmony in living, not political faiths; a bilateral loyalty, not commercial or social projects. Griswold v. Connecticut

In Conaway v. Deane (2003), the Maryland Court of Appeals ruled that the State has a legitimate interest in encouraging a family structure in which children are born. The court then refrained from deciding whether this interest was served by the status quo, leaving it to the other branches to decide. The Massachusetts Supreme Court concluded in Goodridge v. Department of Public Health that even if it were the case that children fare better when raised by opposite-sex parents, the argument against same-sex marriage is unsound because the state failed to show how banning same-sex marriages discouraged gay and lesbian individuals from forming families or how restricting marriage to heterosexual couples discouraged heterosexual individuals from having nonmarital children.

In June 2005, a New Jersey state appeals court, in the decision Lewis v. Harris, upheld a state law defining marriage as the union of one man and one woman, in part, by accepting that the marriage procreation link although maybe not wise wasn't irrational. However, in 2006, the New Jersey state Supreme Court unanimously overruled that decision, requiring the state to make available to all couples in New Jersey the equal protection of family laws irrespective of the gender of the participants but not necessarily the title.

In 2003, the Arizona Court of Appeals, in a decision Standhardt v. Superior Court (77 P.3d 451, 463-464) with regards to Arizona's state marriage law, a three judge panel concluded that the petitioners had failed to prove that the State's prohibition of same sex marriage is not rationally related to a legitimate state interest holding that the State has a legitimate interest in encouraging procreation and child-rearing within the marital relationship, and that limiting marriage to the union of one man and one woman is rationally related to that interest and that even assuming that the State's reasoning for prohibiting same sex marriage was debatable, it was not 'arbitrary' or 'irrational'.

In 1971, the Supreme Court of Minnesota, in the decision Baker v. Nelson (191 N.W.2d 185), ruled the state definition survived constitutional scrutiny. The case was appareled to the US Supreme Court who refused to hear the case for want of a substantial federal question.

In the 2010 US case Perry v. Schwarzenegger, the trial judge found that "[c]hildren raised by gay or lesbian parents are as likely as children raised by heterosexual parents to be healthy, successful and well-adjusted," and that this conclusion was "accepted beyond serious debate in the field of developmental psychology."

== Controversy ==
There is debate over the impact of same-sex marriage upon families and children.

Social conservatives and other opponents of same-sex marriage may not see marriage as a legal construct of the state, but as a naturally occurring "pre-political institution" that the state must recognize; one such conservative voice, Jennifer Roback Morse, reasons that "government does not create marriages any more than government creates jobs." The article, Marriage and the Limits of Contract, argues that the definition proposed by same-sex marriage advocates changes the social importance of marriage from its natural function of reproduction into a mere legality or freedom to have sex. Dennis Prager, in arguing that marriage should be defined exclusively as the union of one woman and one man, claims that families provide the procreative foundation that is the chief building block of civilization. The focus of the argument is that relationships between same-sex couples should not be described as "marriages," and that a rationale for this is that the putative ability to have natural offspring should be a formal requirement for a couple to be able to marry.

Opponents of same-sex marriage, including the Church of Jesus Christ of Latter-day Saints, the United States Conference of Catholic Bishops, the Southern Baptist Convention, and National Organization for Marriage, argue that children do best when raised by a mother and father, and that legalizing same-sex marriage is, therefore, contrary to the best interests of children. David Blankenhorn cites the United Nations Convention on the Rights of the Child which says that a child has "the right to know and be cared for by his or her parents," in support of this argument (before he reversed position on the issue). Some same-sex marriage opponents argue that having and raising children is the underlying purpose of marriage. The opponents of same-sex marriage assume that same-sex unions implicitly lack the everyday ability of opposite-sex couples to produce and raise offspring by natural means. They also argue that children raised by same-sex partners are disadvantaged in various ways and that same-sex unions thus cannot be recognized within the scope of "marriage." The argument that a child has the right to know and be cared for by his or her parents leaves a number of issues open to debate involving same-sex marriage, including infertile heterosexual couples or couples not wishing for children, as well as same-sex unions where a family exists with children from previous relationships, adoption, artificial insemination, surrogacy, or co-parenting. Social consequences are also heavily debated, such as whether marriage should be defined in terms of procreation.

In contrast, same-sex marriage advocates argue that by expanding marriage to gay and lesbian individuals, the state actually protects the rights of all married couples and of children raised by same-sex partners while in no way affecting the rights of opposite-sex married couples and their children, natural or adopted. Some same-sex marriage supporters also claim that the historic definition of marriage is viewed as a license to sexual intercourse and is a license to treat the wife as a possession of her husband, has already been changed by social progress. The legal equality men and women enjoy in modern marriage makes it no longer illegal to have sexual intercourse before marriage.

Some proponents of same-sex marriage argue that laws limiting civil marriage to opposite-sex couples are underinclusive because they do not prohibit marriages between sterile opposite-sex couples or to women past menopause; therefore, they take the view that the procreation argument cannot reasonably be used against same-sex marriages. Proponents also consider these laws restricting marriage to be unconstitutionally overinclusive, as gay and lesbian couples can have children either through natural or artificial means or by adoption. In 2002, in a leading Canadian same-sex marriage case encaptioned Halpern v. Canada (Attorney General), a Canada court found that "excluding gays and lesbians from marriage disregards the needs, capacities, and circumstances of same-sex spouses and their children."

NARTH and American College of Pediatricians (a religious conservative organization; not to be confused with American Academy of Pediatrics) argue that mainstream health and mental health organizations have, in a number of cases, taken public positions on homosexuality and same-sex marriage that are based on their own social and political views rather than the available science. The American Psychological Association, on the other hand, considers positions of NARTH unscientific, and the Canadian Psychological Association has expressed concern that "some are mis-interpreting the findings of psychological research to support their positions, when their positions are more accurately based on other systems of belief or values." Views held by the American College of Pediatricians are also contrary to views of American Academy of Pediatrics and other medical and child welfare authorities which take the view that sexual orientation has no correlation with the ability to be a good parent and raise healthy and well-adjusted children.

Stanley Kurtz of the Hoover Institution contends that same-sex marriage separates the ideas of marriage and parenthood, thereby accelerating marital decline. Kurtz points to Scandinavia as an example of such a place, though he admits that in that case, other factors have also led to the decline of marriage.

== Divorce rates ==
The article Nordic Bliss? Scandinavian Registered Partnerships and the Same-Sex Marriage Debate in Issues in Legal Scholarship Journal notes the effect of same-sex partnerships on opposite-sex marriage and divorce rates was conducted looking at over 15 years of data from the Scandinavian countries. The study by researcher Darren Spedale found that 15 years after Denmark had granted same-sex couples the rights of marriage, rates of opposite-sex marriage in those countries had gone up, and rates of opposite-sex divorce had gone down – contradicting the concept that same-sex marriages would have a negative effect on opposite-sex marriages.

A multi-method, multi-informant comparison of community samples of committed gay male and lesbian (30 participants each) couples with both committed (50 young engaged and 40 older married participants) and non-committed (109 exclusively dating) opposite-sex pairs was conducted in 2008. Specifically, in this study the quality of same- and opposite-sex relationships was examined at multiple levels of analysis via self-reports and partner reports, laboratory observations, and measures of physiological reactivity during dyadic interactions. Additionally, individuals in same-sex, engaged, and marital relationships were compared with one another on adult attachment security as assessed through the coherence of participants' narratives about their childhood experiences. Results indicated that individuals in committed same-sex relationships were generally not distinguishable from their committed opposite-sex counterparts.

== See also ==
- LGBT parenting
- Reproductive technology#Same-sex procreation
