= Frances Reid (director) =

American filmmaker, producer and cinematographer

Frances Reid is an American filmmaker, producer and cinematographer known for her documentaries. She has been in filmmaking for three decades. In 1994, she was nominated alongside director Dee Mosbacher for an Academy Award for Best Documentary Short for Straight from the Heart, which explored relationships between straight parents and their gay children. She was again nominated for an Oscar for producing and directing Long Night's Journey into Day (2000).

== Activism ==
In 1977, Reid became an associate of the Women's Institute for Freedom of the Press (WIFP). WIFP is an American nonprofit publishing organization. The organization works to increase communication between women and connect the public with forms of women-based media.

== Filmography ==
=== Director ===
- 1977: In the Best Interests of the Children (co-director)
- 1994: Straight from the Heart
- 1996: All God's Children
- 1977: In the Best Interests of the Children
- 2000: Long Night's Journey Into Day
- 2005: Waging a Living (co-director)

=== Producer ===
- 1994: Straight from the Heart (producer)
- 1995: Skin Deep: Building Diverse Campus Communities (producer)
- 2000: Long Night's Journey Into Today (producer)
- 2003: Lost Boys of Sudan (executive producer)
- 2005: Waging a Living (co-producer)
- 2011: Happy

=== Cinematographer ===
- 1984: The Times of Harvey Milk
- 1987: Reno's Kids: 87 Days + 11
- 1994: Complaints of a Dutiful Daughter
- 1995: A Personal Journey with Martin Scorsese Through American Movies
- 2000: Long Night's Journey Into Day
