= Charlotte Patterson =

American psychologist

Charlotte Jessie Patterson
- Education: B.A. Pomona College (1971), M.A. and Ph.D. Stanford University (1972, 1975)
- Known for: LGBT parenting research
- Awards: Award for Distinguished Contributions to Research in Public Policy from the American Psychological Association (2009)
- Scientific career
- Fields: Psychology
- Institutions: University of Virginia
- Thesis: The role of self-instructional plans in children's resistance to temptation (1975)

Charlotte J. Patterson is a professor of psychology at the University of Virginia. Patterson is also a member of the United States Census Bureau's National Advisory Committee on Racial, Ethnic and Other Populations, established in 2012, as well as a fellow of the Association for Psychological Science and American Psychological Association (APA). She is known for her research into the psychological effects of LGBT parenting, for which she was awarded the Award for Distinguished Contributions to Research in Public Policy in 2009 by the APA.

== Research and views ==
Patterson has been described as "the world’s expert on psychological research on children and youths raised by lesbian and gay parents." In addition to publishing numerous scientific studies on this topic, she testified before the Institute of Medicine on the topic of lesbian-related research in 1997. Her research has found that children raised by same-sex parents develop at least as well as children raised by heterosexual parents. She also authored a report, released by the APA in 2004, which stated that "Not a single study has found children of lesbian or gay parents to be disadvantaged in any significant respect relative to children of heterosexual parents." Patterson estimated that there may be a hundred million Americans that either identify themselves as gay or lesbian or have a relative who does.
