= It's Elementary: Talking About Gay Issues in School =

1996 documentary film

- 1996 VHS release
- Directed by: Debra Chasnoff; Helen Cohen
- Written by: Debra Chasnoff
- Produced by: Debra Chasnoff; Helen Cohen
- Cinematography: Rick Butler; Stephen McCarthy; Patsy Northcutt; Fred Wessel; Fawn Yacker; Alex Zakrzewski
- Edited by: Shirley Thompson
- Music by: Jon Herbst
- Production companies: GroundSpark; Women's Educational Media
- Distributed by: New Day Films; PBS
- Release date: 1996
- Running time: 78 minutes
- Country: United States
- Language: English

It's Elementary: Talking About Gay Issues in School is a 1996 American documentary film directed by Debra Chasnoff and Helen S. Cohen. It provides educators with information on how to teach elementary schoolchildren to be tolerant of gay and lesbian people. It earned awards from several American film festivals, was broadcast on public television stations, and was obtained by more than 3,000 institutions for educational use. The film was noted as the "first of its kind" and was generally well received, although there was backlash from conservatives.

The documentary received little support from PBS, owing to backlash from the American Family Association. Prior to airing the film, television stations received calls, letters, and e-mails from people who did not want PBS program directors to broadcast It's Elementary. The film was awarded the GLAAD Media Award for Outstanding Documentary, Best Documentary at the Reeling Film Festival, and the Silver Spire from the San Francisco International Film Festival, among other awards. The film had two sequels: That's a Family! and It's Still Elementary.

== Background ==
Debra Chasnoff wanted to direct an educational video series that deals with teaching children about issues involving people who are homosexual, but she learned that there was not much information about the topic that was aimed towards educators. She said, "The current conservative political climate, which is incredibly hostile to the mere mention of homosexuality, has made many teachers afraid of talking to kids about gays and lesbians".

The lack of available information motivated Chasnoff to continue trying to complete the film. Chasnoff and producer Helen Cohen talked to American teachers who already had curricula involving gay people. It was hard for them to gain entry into the schools, as multiple staff and parents did not want to be recorded. Some of the parents kept their children away from the school during filming. The schools are in San Francisco and New York City, as well as Madison, Wisconsin, and Cambridge, Massachusetts.

Chasnoff said in 1999, "Sadly, part of the reason I think the film is being picked up is because of the time. Our campaign falls within the same window of time that the Matthew Shepard murder and trial are going on, the murder of Billy Jack Gaither, and now Colorado", referring to the homophobic language that had been used to harass the perpetrators of the 1999 Columbine High School massacre.

== Synopsis ==
Directed by Chasnoff and Cohen, the film was described by the book Voices of Transgender Children in Early Childhood Education as "the first of its kind" to provide educators with information on how to prevent discrimination against people who are gay. It focuses on the education of elementary schoolchildren to not be intolerant of those who are gay or lesbian. In the film, first-grade through eighth-grade students talk about LGBTQ subjects. The younger children were often more accepting of those who are LGBTQ. The film has two versions: one of which is just under 40 minutes long, and the other of which is 78 minutes long. The cut version was created as a training version.

The teachers that were surveyed had various teaching methods of educating about homosexuality. The educators included a fourth-grade teacher who "encourages her students to brainstorm on the words 'gay' and 'lesbian', and to talk about the roots of their associations, assumptions, and attitudes". An eighth-grade teacher dismantled stereotypes about people who are gay or lesbian while also having their students interview a gay man and a lesbian woman. A principal of an elementary school held a photography event at the school named "Love Makes a Family", in which "families with gay and lesbian couples at the heads of households" are depicted. A girl with lesbian parents read a Mother's Day essay about her mothers. A fifth-grade teacher noticed that her students have no issues with pictures and stories of children and their gay parents. A Puerto Rican teacher stated that her heritage was part of her not being open to LGBTQ matters.

== Release ==
It's Elementary: Talking About Gay Issues in School was released in several film festivals. The film was released on VHS in 1996 by New Day Films, and it was released on DVD in 2008 by the same distributor. The DVD includes closed captioning, Spanish subtitles, educator resources, and special features like deleted scenes, an interview with the director, and the sequel It's Still Elementary. Also included is a 136-page guide about how to use the film within school systems and communities. The June 8, 1999 issue of The Advocate reported that the film would be broadcast on at least 60 PBS stations. Chasnoff and Cohen started a campaign to motivate people to ask local television stations for the film to be aired.

In 1999, PBS refused to televise the film on its national affiliate stations, but the broadcaster sold the airing rights to other stations by using an independent company. At the time of a June 7, 1999 article in The Baltimore Sun, 89 public television stations decided to air the film, 80 of them refused to carry it, and 53 of them had not made a decision. The film did not receive much support from PBS for its first television broadcast because of backlash from the American Family Association (AFA). Prior to airing the film, television stations received calls, letters, and e-mails from people who did not want PBS program directors to broadcast It's Elementary. Program director of KCWC Ruby Calvert said, "I've had lots and lots of calls from people in Wyoming," adding that she was struggling with scheduling the film.

== Reception and influence ==
The film received a positive reception from the National Education Association (NEA) president and the National Parent Teacher Association (PTA). The NEA president said in response to the film, "Schools cannot be neutral when we're dealing with issues of human dignity and human rights." Starting with its release, more than 3,000 educational institutions obtained the film. It has been shared in thousands of settings within the United States and internationally. A 1999 journal article from the Women's International League for Peace and Freedom states that the film has "inspiring footage shot in schools across the country" and that it is "a topic that often leaves adults tongue-tied".

The film won Best Documentary at the Frameline Film Festival, the Reeling Film Festival, the Turin Gay & Lesbian Film Festival, and the Santa Barbara Lesbian and Gay Film Festival. It was awarded the CINE Golden Eagle for Teacher Education and Best Educational Film at the Northern Lights International Film Festival. The film was awarded the GLAAD Media Award for Outstanding Documentary in 1997. The film received the Silver Spire from the San Francisco International Film Festival, the Silver Apple from the National Educational Media Market, and the Audience Award from the Austin Gay and Lesbian International Film Festival.

Conservatives such as the head of the Family Defense Council were upset with its release. Chasnoff and Cohen received backlash from groups that claimed that they "were promoting a homosexual agenda" and brainwashing children into a "homosexual lifestyle". Conservatives in Idaho were against public broadcasting of the film and set up billboards opposing the film. The American Family Association responded to the film with one of their own, titled Suffer the Children: Answering the Homosexual Agenda in Public Schools. Author Jamie Campbell Naidoo said that the AFA's film takes quotes from It's Elementary out of context and makes it seem that the children are being "taught to be homosexual in the classroom".

Philanthropist James Hormel contributed $12,000 to the funding of It's Elementary. The revelation of this fact was one of the factors that caused his 1997 nomination for an ambassadorship to be blocked by the United States Senate, with conservative senators expressing concerns that Hormel was involved in advocating for the "gay lifestyle". Senator Bob Smith of New Hampshire said that the film discredits a speech that Smith gave in the Senate in which he describes education programs about gay people as "trash".

== Legacy ==
The Wexner Center for the Arts at the Ohio State University held a 2008 screening for the short version of the film and its sequel It's Still Elementary. A discussion was held after the films by the director of the Franklin County Education Council, Brad Mitchell, and teachers from Pink T.I.G.ers who attempt to prevent homophobia in schools. A 2018 screening was held at the Frameline Film Festival in honor of posthumously awarding Chasnoff the 2018 Frameline Award. The Frameline Film Festival said that the film "boldly turned the minefield of teaching about LGBTQ issues in elementary schools into a navigable playing field" and "was instrumental in bringing queer issues into elementary school curricula." The book Voices of Transgender Children in Early Childhood Education used the film as an example of LGBTQ issues included in academia for young students. The sequel It's Still Elementary was used as an example of the success of LGBTQ programs in schools, including a decrease in bullying and more social inclusion.

== Sequels ==
Ginny Markell, the president of the PTA, presented one of the film's sequels, That's a Family!, at the White House. That's a Family! shows children talking about homosexual households and other families that differ from the common household. The families include parents that are "divorced, adoptive, guardian, parents with drugs, multi-racial, multi-religious, or disabled". The film was directed by Chasnoff. It was released in 2000, and is 34 minutes long.

Another sequel was released, titled It's Still Elementary. The film is a follow-up of the lives of the students and teachers of the first film. Similar to the first two films, It's Still Elementary was directed by Chasnoff. It was released in 2007, and is 47 minutes long.

== Works cited ==
- Auten, Roseana (September 6, 1996). "It's Elementary brings gay issues to the classroom". The Austin Chronicle. Archived from the original on January 12, 2022.
- Haar, Charlene K. (2002). The politics of the PTA. Transaction Publishers. p. 98. ISBN 978-1-4128-4534-2. Archived from the original on January 12, 2022.
- Naidoo, Jamie Campbell (April 13, 2012). Rainbow Family Collections: Selecting and Using Children's Books with Lesbian, Gay, Bisexual, Transgender, and Queer Content. ABC-CLIO. ISBN 978-1-59884-961-5.
- Notaro, Gerald (November 9, 2018). "It's Elementary: Talking About Gay Issues in School". Educational Media Review Online. Archived from the original on January 12, 2022.
- Schenden, Laurie (June 8, 1999). "School's 'out' for summer". The Advocate. Here Publishing. pp. 63–64. Archived from the original on January 6, 2022.
- Sullivan, Ashley L.; Urraro, Laurie L. (June 29, 2019). Voices of Transgender Children in Early Childhood Education: Reflections on Resistance and Resiliency. Springer. p. 26. doi:10.1007/978-3-030-13483-9. ISBN 978-3-030-13483-9. S2CID 198612589. Archived from the original on January 12, 2022.
- Walters, Barry (May 23, 1996). "Taking gay issues into the classroom". San Francisco Examiner. Archived from the original on January 7, 2021 – via Newspapers.com.
- Wang, Selina (November 9, 2018). "That's a Family! A film for kids about family diversity". Educational Media Review Online. Archived from the original on January 22, 2021.
