= Rene Portland =

American basketball coach

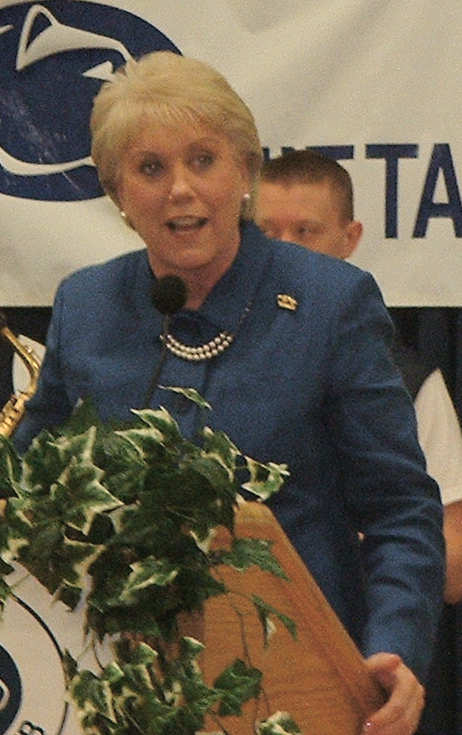
- Portland speaking at a pep rally in 2007

Biographical details
- Born: March 31, 1953; Broomall, Pennsylvania, U.S.
- Died: July 22, 2018 (aged 65); Tannersville, Pennsylvania, U.S.

Playing career
- 1972–1975: Immaculata

Coaching career (HC unless noted)
- 1976–1978: Saint Joseph's
- 1978–1980: Colorado
- 1980–2007: Penn State

Head coaching record
- Overall: 693–265

Accomplishments and honors

Championships
- As player: 3× National champion (1973–1975); As coach: NCAA Regional—Final Four (2000)

Awards
- 4x Big Ten Coach of the Year (1994, 2000, 2003, 2004); 2x WBCA Coach of the Year (1991, 2004)
Medal record
Women's basketball
Head Coach for United States
World University Games
Silver medal – second place	1999 Palma de Mallorca, Spain	Team competition
Head Coach for United States
FIBA Under-19 World Championship
Gold medal – first place	1997 Natal, Brazil	Team competition

Maureen Theresa Muth "Rene" Portland (March 31, 1953 – July 22, 2018) was an American head coach in women's college basketball, known for her 27-year tenure with the Penn State Nittany Lions basketball team. Her career included 21 NCAA tournament appearances including a Final Four appearance in 2000, one AIAW national tournament appearance (1977, St. Joseph's), five Big Ten Conference championships and eight conference tournament titles (the first six in the Atlantic 10).

Portland was one of a few women's basketball coaches to have won 600 or more games at a single school, with a career record of 606–236 at Penn State. Her notoriety grew when it was revealed that she had for decades discriminated against homosexual players on the Penn State women's basketball team.

== Early life ==
Portland was born and raised in Broomall, Pennsylvania,

== Coaching career ==
Portland was hired as head coach of the Penn State Lady Lions basketball program in 1980, following two seasons at St. Joseph's and two seasons at Colorado. Portland was previously one of the star players at Immaculata College, one of the early powers in women's college basketball, where Portland helped lead the team to three national titles. Several of her teammates also went on to become prominent women's coaches, such as Theresa Grentz and Marianne Stanley.

Portland served 27 seasons as the Lady Lions head coach. She won over 600 games at Penn State, making her sixth in most wins in AIAW/NCAA Division I women's basketball. Although she had coached many Lady Lions teams to the NCAA tournament, she had been unable to win a national championship. Portland had a demonstrated commitment to charitable causes, participating in the first annual "Think Pink" day to raise funds for breast cancer research.

On March 22, 2007, Penn State Intercollegiate Athletics announced Portland's resignation, effective immediately.

On April 23, 2007, the university announced Coquese Washington as her successor.

=== Anti-lesbian controversy ===
Portland forbade lesbian athletes in her program, as she explained in a 1986 article in The Chicago Sun-Times:

One of the first things Penn State coach Rene Portland brings up during a recruiting visit with a prospective player and her parents is lesbian activity. "I will not have it in my program," Portland said. "I bring it up and the kids are so relieved and the parents are so relieved. But they would probably go without asking the question otherwise, which is really dumb."

— The Chicago Sun-Times, June 16, 1986

The statement was made prior to adoption of Penn State's policy on nondiscrimination and harassment in 1991; however, according to the 2009 documentary film Training Rules, no action was taken against Portland's prohibition.

In 2006, former player Jennifer Harris accused Portland of removing her from the team because of her perceived sexual orientation. Harris filed a federal lawsuit against Portland, athletic director Tim Curley, and the university. An internal university review found that Portland created a "hostile, intimidating, and offensive environment" based on Harris's perceived sexual orientation. Portland was fined $10,000, required to attend diversity training sessions, and placed on "zero tolerance" for future violations of the nondiscrimination policy.

Responding to the sanctions, Portland stated that "the process that was used to reach these conclusions was flawed." Kate Kendell, executive director of the National Center for Lesbian Rights, said that "consequences faced by Rene Portland are insulting and inadequate."

In February 2007, the lawsuit was settled out of court—before Portland's resignation the following month—under confidential terms and described in a joint statement as "amicable". Despite being forced out of the Penn State job, many of her fellow coaches in the Big Ten conference continued to support her.

The documentary film Training Rules, co-directed by Dee Mosbacher and Fawn Yacker, explores incident further, featuring interviews with several players about their experience with Portland and the anti-homosexual environment she allegedly perpetuated during her tenure.

Under Portland's 27-year career as Penn State's women's basketball coach, which lasted from the 1980–81 season through 2006–07, 113 student-athletes appeared on the Penn State roster. Seven players from Portland's final season remained on the squad when Coquese Washington became the next head coach. Hence, there were 106 players who concluded their time as Lady Lions under Portland.

Of these, 57 completed 4-year college careers at Penn State; however, the rest (49, or nearly half) stayed less than four seasons. Approximately 46% of Portland's players left Penn State while they still had college eligibility remaining. In 2013, the comparable attrition rate under Washington was 21%.

=== USA Basketball ===
In 1993, Portland served as an assistant coach to FIBA Junior World Championship head coach Jim Foster. The event was held in Seoul, South Korea August 1–8, 1993. The U.S. improved their record from the 1985 and 1989 events to 5–2, but that finish placed the team seventh overall.

In 1997, Portland became the head coach of the U.S. team competing in the Junior World Championship. That event was held in Natal, Brazil July 5–13, 1997. After beating Japan in the opening game, the US played defending champion Australia in the second round. Despite having a 13-point lead at one time, the US let the lead slip away and lost 80–74. However, the US team then went on to win a four-point game against Cuba, and won easily against Russia and Spain to move to the medal rounds. In the semi-final the US team faced Slovakia, and won 90–77 to move the team into their first ever finals for a FIBA Junior World team. The final was against Australia who had beaten the U.S. in the second game. The US team had a three-point lead with three seconds to go, but Australia hit a three pointer to send the game to overtime. Australia scored first, the U.S. outscored the Australians 7–2 to take a small lead. The lead was down to two points with 30 seconds left in the game, but the US hit free throws to win 78–74, notching the first-ever gold medal for a Junior World Championship team from the US.

Portland served as the head coach of the USA representative to the 1999 World University Games (also known as the Universiade). The event was held in Palma de Mallorca, Spain. The U.S. team won their opening two games easily, including a mismatch against South Africa with a final score of 140–32, but lost against Ukraine, 81–70. They earned a position in the medal rounds and defeated Lithuania in the quarterfinals. The US then took on undefeated Russia and won a close game 87–79, setting up the championship game between the U.S. and host Spain. After falling behind early, the U.S. team kept the game close, and got within five points with under two minutes to go, but Spain held on to win the gold medal. The U.S. team received the silver medal.

== Death ==
Portland died in Tannersville, Pennsylvania following a three-year battle with peritoneal cancer on July 22, 2018, aged 65.

== Awards and honors ==
- 2005 Penn State Renaissance Fund's Person of the Year
- 2004 WBCA Russell Athletic National Coach of the Year
- 2004 Big Ten Coach of the Year (Coaches and Media)
- 2003 Big Ten Coach of the Year (Coaches and Media)
- 2003 Naismith National Coach of the Year Finalist
- 2001 Completed the Saltine Cracker Challenge
- 2001 Inductee of the Pennsylvania Sports Hall of Fame
- 2002 Inductee of the Mount Nittany Society
- 2000 Women's Basketball Journal National Coach of the Year
- 2000 IKON/WBCA District 6 Coach of the Year
- 2000 Big Ten Conference Coach of the Year
- 2000 Naismith National Coach of the Year Finalist
- 1997 USA Basketball's Developmental Coach of the Year
- 1995 Naismith National Coach of the Year Finalist
- 1994 Big Ten Conference Coach of the Year
- 1993 Newspaper Enterprise Association National Coach of the Year
- 1992 Converse/U.S. Basketball Writers Association National Coach of the Year
- 1991 WBCA National Coach of the Year
- 1989-90 Women's Basketball coaches Association President
- 1983 Atlantic 10 Conference Coach of the Year

== See also ==
- List of college women's basketball career coaching wins leaders
