= The Nuclear Beauty Parlor =

- Formation: May 24, 1983
- Founded at: San Francisco
- Dissolved: 1986
- Type: Affinity group/ Activist Art group
- Legal status: Non-profit
- Purpose: Protest, performance activism, prankster art
- Affiliations: Livermore Action Group
- Volunteers: Ten founding members; nine additional volunteers

The Nuclear Beauty Parlor is a group of women artists active in protest and performance art, primarily during the nuclear freeze movement from 1983 to 1986 in San Francisco. Their name is synonymous with a music project they originated, the 45-RPM 7-inch single, The Nuclear Beauty Parlor. Two members of the Nuclear Beauty Parlor wrote the lyrics to the song which debuted in the women’s jail following the 1983 blockade of Lawrence Livermore National Laboratory, one of the largest anti-nuclear protests in the United States. The group staged numerous performances to attract media attention for the cause of nuclear disarmament. The record, conceived as an art prank, is archived in the Peace Library at Swarthmore College. The group is noted for adding humor and post-punk style to a dedicated protest movement.

== History ==
On May 24, 1983, ten women formed an affinity group to prepare for the mass arrests planned for the International Day of Nuclear Disarmament protest of June 20, 1983. They were trained in civil disobedience by Livermore Action Group. The female membership grew over the next 3 years, as they evolved into a performance art and activist art group. Founding member Vicki Krohn Amorose originally coined the name Nuclear Beauty Parlor and she, along with founding member Denise Slattery, wrote the lyrics to the Nuclear Beauty Parlor song. The group was not a band; they enacted political satire in the tradition of guerrilla theatre and performance activism.

== Activities ==
On June 20, 1983, the group participated in the blockade of Lawrence Livermore National Laboratories. More than 1000 demonstrators were arrested, including three members of the Nuclear Beauty Parlor, and jailed for 11 days in tents on the grounds of the Alameda County Jail. The group gained their first media attention with a San Francisco Examiner headline: Nuclear Beauty Parlor a Hit in Jail.

American activist group Nuclear Beauty Parlor's record cover

During November and December,1983, the Nuclear Beauty Parlor acquired non-profit status, under the title Bay Area Energy Action. Bill Graham (promoter), San Francisco music impresario, funded production of the Nuclear Beauty Parlor 45-RPM 7-inch single. The lyrics were set to music and the record was produced by the group's friend and ally, Stacy Baird. Side A, The Nuclear Beauty Parlor, was performed by Re Styles and other members of The Tubes. Side B, Awake, was recorded at OTR Studios under the direction of Cookie Marenco. The Nuclear Beauty Parlor 45-RPM single was released and a press conference held on Dec 15,1983.

Between January and April, 1984, the group solidified its identity as a performance art group with the goal of gaining media attention for the nuclear freeze movement. The record gained airplay and press. On April 16, 1984, the group performs the first in a series of "Tax Day actions" at Rincon Annex Post Office in Rincon Center. Playing to the audience of taxpayers lined up in cars to meet the midnight tax-filing deadline, the Nuclear Beauty Parlor interacted as costumed waitresses, served weapon-themed food, and encourage people to: "Have one, you paid for it!" They attracted attention from TV and newspaper reporters.

The Democratic National Convention was held in San Francisco on July 14 and 15, 1984. In conjunction with "A Vision of America at Peace", the Nuclear Beauty Parlor performed an original play with songs, titled "The First Lady Debate". The group recorded "The First Lady Debate" and distributed tapes to radio stations nationwide.

On the eve of the Nov 6, 1984, presidential election, the group pasted thousands of anti-Reagan posters in downtown San Francisco, designed by artist Paul Mavrides, who also designed the record jacket. Although the posters were quickly removed after Ronald Reagan’s victory, photographer C. Baldwin captured the morning-after image and created a postcard.

A December 1984 Ms. Magazine article on the group helped to boost record sales.

In their second Tax Day performance at Rincon Annex Post Office on April 15, 1985, The Nuclear Beauty Parlor dressed as couture nuclear weapons with price tags, and interacted with last-minute taxpayers, resulting in local TV and press coverage.

In July and September, 1985, the group adapted their nuclear weapon costumes for The Fashion Show presented by New Langton Arts. An original script read by the MC accompanied the runway show, titled "The Nuclear Fashion Arsenal", which was also performed a second time at Fort Mason for the International Day of Peace.

In the group's third Tax Day performance, April 15, 1986, at Rincon Annex Post Office, The Nuclear Beauty Parlor enacted taxpayer robberies with pink machine guns.

In the 1990s, The Nuclear Beauty Parlor record was housed in the Audio Visual Collection of the Swarthmore College Peace Collection.

The group produced a PSA for the 2020 election. A Message From The Nuclear Beauty Parlor

== Members and Names ==
The founding group members are Marissa Hutter LaMagna, Diana Wendling, Denise Slattery, Laura Graham, Lisa Andreini, Cecilia London, Kathy Staats Hornbeak, Marjorie Newman, Vicki Krohn Amorose and Fawn Yacker. Membership grew to include Connie Hendrix, Suzanne Stefanac, Kelly Cash, Lexine Alpert, Brenda Burson, Nancy Leszczynski, Siri Aarons, Christine Stiles and Suzy Poole.

== See also ==
- Peace Action
- Nuclear disarmament
