= Training Rules =

2009 documentary film by Dee Mosbacher and Fawn Yacker

- Theatrical release poster
- Directed by: Dee Mosbacher; Fawn Yacker
- Written by: Dee Mosbacher; Fawn Yacker
- Produced by: Dee Mosbacher; Fawn Yacker
- Cinematography: Fawn Yacker
- Edited by: Gina Leibrecht; Gail Mallimson
- Release date: March 2009
- Running time: 63 minutes
- Country: United States
- Language: English

Training Rules (subtitled No Drinking, No Drugs, No Lesbians) is a 2009 American documentary co-produced and co-directed by Dee Mosbacher and Fawn Yacker. It is narrated by Diana Nyad.

The film examines how women's collegiate sports, caught in a web of homophobic practices, collude in the destruction of the lives and dreams of many of its most talented athletes. It focuses on the women's basketball program at Pennsylvania State University under head coach Rene Portland and her policy of discrimination on her players based on their sexual orientation over a 27-year period as coach of the university's basketball program, particularly from the 1980s to the late 1990s.

The 63-minute film is a Woman Vision production. Director Mosbacher, a lesbian feminist activist filmmaker and psychiatrist, established Woman Vision as a nonprofit organization, to promote tolerance and equal treatment of all people through the production and use of educational media.

== Film summary ==
According to testimony in the documentary, Rene Portland, who became Penn State's women's basketball coach in 1980, was open with her recruits about her distaste for gay individuals. She set the policy as "No Drinking, No Drugs, No Lesbians", letting every player know that being a lesbian or associating with lesbians would not be tolerated under any circumstance. If a player violated this "rule", she would be dismissed immediately; hence, the title of the film, Training Rules.

After Portland had coached for 25 winning seasons at Penn State, Jennifer Harris, a player expelled from the program in 2005 who believes she was excluded because she was perceived as a lesbian, and the National Center for Lesbian Rights filed a lawsuit that prompted former Penn State players to come out to corroborate Harris' story. In February 2007, when Portland and her co-defendants appeared on the verge of losing a legal judgment, the case was settled out of court. Portland then resigned in March 2007.

Lisa Faloon, who was also interviewed in the documentary, says that Portland warned players that their scholarship would be canceled and they would never play basketball again if they talked to players suspended because of their sexual orientation. Cindy Davies was another talented young basketball player struggling with her sexuality in the 1980s. When interviewed for the documentary, she said that coach Portland threatened to out her to her parents and to the media, as well as to expel her from the team. Davies left Penn State quietly. In 1986, Portland's views were first quoted in the Chicago Sun-Times: "I will not have it (lesbian activity) in my program".

USA Today’s Christine Brennan attempted to encapsulate the real problem by wondering what would have happened if Portland had had a different policy: "I will not recruit black people. I will not recruit Jewish people. I will not recruit Asian people. How quickly would that woman be fired?" She went on to note that the same outcry apparently did not apply if a coach said that he or she would not recruit lesbians.

Neither Penn State's president nor the head of athletics took any action related to the "no lesbians" policy, in spite of the fact that it violated the University's non-discrimination policy related to sexual orientation, which was passed in 1991.

Under Portland's 27-year tenure as Penn State's women's basketball coach (from the 1980–81 season through 2006–07), there were 113 student-athletes who appeared on the Penn State roster. Seven players from Portland's final season remained on the squad when Coquese Washington became the next head coach. Hence, there were 106 players who concluded their time as Lady Lions under Portland.

Of these, 57 completed 4-year college careers at Penn State; however, the rest (49, or nearly half) stayed less than four seasons. Thus, close to 46% of Portland's players left Penn State while they still had college eligibility remaining. The comparable attrition rate under Washington was 21%.

== Screenings ==
- Philadelphia Film Festival (world premiere)
- Atlanta Film Festival
- St. Cloud GLBTA Film Festival (St. Cloud, Minnesota)
- Miami & Fort Lauderdale Gay & Lesbian Film Festival
- Inside Out Festival, Toronto
- Out Film Connecticut
- Birmingham Shout (Birmingham, AL)
- Portland Queer Documentary Film Festival
- NewFest in New York
- Frameline33, San Francisco International LGBT Film Festival
- Minneapolis Gay & Lesbian Film Festival
- Kansas City Gay & Lesbian Film Festival
- Philadelphia QFest
- Outfest Los Angeles
- Gaze Film Festival, Ireland (European premiere)
- Michigan Womyn's Festival
- OUT ON SCREEN/Vancouver Queer Film & Video
- North Carolina Gay & Lesbian Film Festival
- Austin Gay & Lesbian Film Festival
- Pikes Peak Lavender Film Festival (Colorado Springs)
- Out Takes Dallas Gay & Lesbian Film Festival
- CLIP Tampa Bay: Tampa International Gay & Lesbian Film Festival
- ImageOut: Rochester LGBT Film and Video Festival
- Reel Affirmations 19: Washington DC LGBT Film Festival
- Milwaukee LGBT Film Festival
- Pittsburgh Lesbian and Gay Film Festival
- Seattle Lesbian and Gay Film Festival
- Paris Feminist & Lesbian Film Festival
- image+nation: Montréal International LGBT Film Festival
- Spokane GLBT Film Festival
- Reeling: The Chicago Lesbian & Gay International Film Festival
- Rehoboth Beach Independent Film Festival
- Ljublijana Gay & Lesbian Film Festival (Slovenia)

The film was also shown in many universities and colleges including at Penn State.

== Awards and honors ==
- 2009: Won Best Documentary (AT&T Audience Award) at Frameline33, San Francisco International LGBT Film Festival
- 2009: Won "Pink Peach Award" (Jury Award) at the Atlanta Film Festival
- 2009: Won Best Documentary (Audience Choice Award) at the Birmingham Shout Festival
- 2009: Won Best Documentary at the Pikes Peak Lavender Film Festival in Colorado Springs
- 2009: For Training Rules, director Mosbacher was honored with the first Barbara Gittings Award for Civil Rights Achievement in Film
