= Nanette Gartrell =

American psychiatrist, researcher and lesbian activist

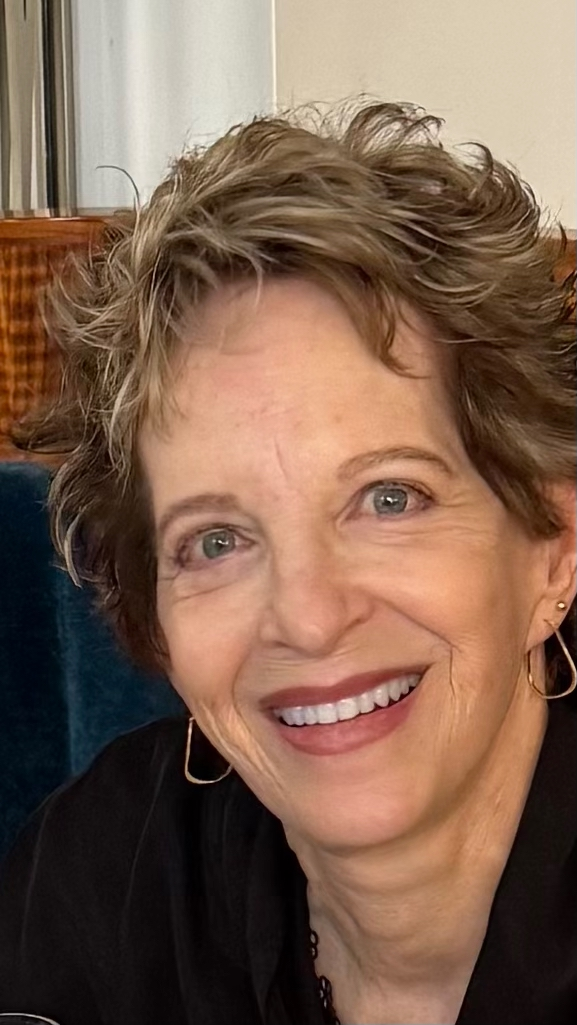
- Gartrell in 2025
- Born: Nanette Kathryn Gartrell; 1949 (age 76–77)
- Education: Stanford University; University of California; Harvard University
- Known for: U.S. National Longitudinal Lesbian Family Study
- Spouse: Dee Mosbacher (m. 2005)
- Scientific career
- Fields: Psychiatry
- Workplaces: Williams Institute; University of Amsterdam; Harvard Medical School; University of California, San Francisco

Nanette Kathryn Gartrell is an American psychiatrist, researcher, lesbian activist and writer. Gartrell is the author of over 80 research reports on topics including medical student depression, sexual exploitation of patients by healthcare professionals and sexual minority parent families. Her investigation into physician misconduct led to a clean-up of professional ethics codes and the criminalization of boundary violations. For this work, she was featured in a 1991 PBS Frontline documentary titled My Doctor, My Lover.

Among other works, Gartrell is the author of My Answer Is NO. . . . If That's Okay with You: How Women Can Say NO with Confidence. She was also a co-author of an essay in the 2017 book (and subsequent editions) of The Dangerous Case of Donald Trump: 27 Psychiatrists and Mental Health Experts Assess a President.

Gartrell is probably best known for being the principal researcher since 1986 for the US National Longitudinal Lesbian Family Study, which is the longest-running investigation of lesbian mothers and their children in the world.

== Early life and education ==
Gartrell was born in 1949. Both of her parents dealt with "significant mental illness", and Gartrell and her two younger siblings grew up with family trauma and economic hardships as a result.

At age 11, Gartrell realized that for her own survival, she needed to move to another city once she finished high school. She worked very hard on her studies and earned an academic scholarship to Stanford University. To better understand her family's mental health challenges, she set her sights on becoming a psychiatrist. Within a few months of beginning her studies at Stanford, Gartrell fell in love with a woman, came out as a lesbian, and "ended up face to face with my sexual identity and the Diagnostic and Statistical Manual of Mental Disorders", which at that time said she was mentally ill due to her homosexuality. Knowing that was not true, she said "I decided that I would become a researcher with a goal of learning how to conduct scientific investigations that would provide a much more accurate picture of LGBTQ people than observations of psychiatric inpatients or prison inmates who were forced into experiments that were attempting to change their sexual orientation to heterosexual."

During her senior year at Stanford, Gartrell was required to perform a research study under the guidance of a faculty member. She approached H. Keith H. Brodie, then an assistant professor of psychiatry, who became her mentor and began to teach her how to do research. Gartrell's senior project was a survey of psychiatrists' attitudes concerning lesbianism, which was the first of her many research studies on LGBTQ people.

== Career ==
After earning her undergraduate degree in 1971 from Stanford, Gartrell earned her medical degree at the University of California, completed a psychiatry residency and fellowship at Harvard Medical School, and has been a Williams Institute Visiting Distinguished Scholar at the UCLA School of Law since 2009. She served on the faculty of Harvard Medical School from 1976 to 1987, and was on the faculty at the University of California, San Francisco from 1988 to 2011. She had a guest appointment at the University of Amsterdam from 2009 to 2025.

For 13 years, Gartrell volunteered her psychiatric services to chronically mentally ill homeless people. An experience in one of these shelters became the basis for her 2006 article in the San Francisco Chronicle Magazine, "A Tenderloin Tail."

The Nanette K. Gartrell papers, a collection of Gartrell's personal, professional, and political life, are archived in the Sophia Smith Collection, Smith College, Northampton, Massachusetts.

=== US National Longitudinal Lesbian Family Study ===
Gartrell has been the Principal Researcher for the US National Longitudinal Lesbian Family Study (NLLFS) since 1986. The NLLFS followed lesbian mothers and their children who were conceived by donor insemination during the 1980s. The study examined the social, psychological, and emotional development of the children as well as the dynamics of planned lesbian families. This has been the longest-running and largest prospective investigation of lesbian mothers and their children in the world.

In June 2010, the NLLFS study US National Longitudinal Lesbian Family Study: Psychological Adjustment of the 17-Year-Old Adolescents was published in Pediatrics. The study's results showed that the 17-year-olds of lesbian mothers were rated significantly higher in social, academic, and total competence and significantly lower in social problems, rule-breaking, aggressive, and externalizing problem behavior than their age-matched counterparts. This publication prompted international media attention including articles in the Los Angeles Times, The Telegraph (UK), Time, and a mention on The Colbert Report. Discover magazine named this story as one of the top 100 stories of 2010, as number 88: "Same-Sex Parents Do No Harm". In 2012, UCLA Today published an article titled "Researcher sorts out fact from fallacy in three-decade study of lesbian families", highlighting Gartrell's 30-plus years of work on the NLLFS study.

In 2018, the New England Journal of Medicine published follow-up findings on the psychological well-being of the NLLFS offspring when they were 25 years old, representing the sixth wave of the long-running study. The report concluded that "in a large, prospective study involving 25-year-olds with sexual minority parents, there were no significant differences in measures of mental health between those who were conceived through donor insemination and enrolled before they were born and those in a U.S. population-based normative sample". Subsequent articles in the mainstream press picked up on the NEJM findings and reported that the subjects of the study "were just fine" when compared to "a sample of typical U.S. 25-year-olds matched on sex, race or ethnic background, and educational level".

In 2021, the Journal of GLBT Family Studies published an article on the sixth wave of the study, focusing on the history of the study, its then-92% retention rate of the original cohort families over the years, its research methodologies and the strategies used to retain participants. It also discussed the "changing cultural, legal, and political landscape for lesbian, gay, bisexual, and transgender people over the past 35 years" as an unforeseen factor in the study results.

The researchers have acknowledged that the NLLFS families studied were a predominantly white, well-educated and cisgendered nonrepresentative sample, and that "future prospective longitudinal studies would benefit from an intersectional approach that explores family dynamics in more diverse samples, including people of all sexual and gender identities, races, ethnicities, socioeconomic groups, and regions of residence".

Gartrell and her co-authors' research, including the NLLFS, were cited among amicus curiae briefs and other legal documents related to same-sex marriage cases, including some that led to the 2015 landmark United States Supreme Court Obergefell v. Hodges decision, which ruled that the fundamental right to marry is guaranteed to same-sex couples.

== Publications ==
=== Selected scholarly articles (co-authored) ===
- Gartrell, Nanette (May–June 2021). "Overview of the 35-year U.S. National Longitudinal Lesbian Family Study and Its 92% Retention Rate". Journal of GLBT Family Studies. 17 (3): 197–213.
- Gartrell, Nanette; Bos, Henny; Koh, Audrey (July 18, 2018). "National Longitudinal Lesbian Family Study – Mental Health of Adult Offspring". New England Journal of Medicine. 379 (3): 297–299. doi:10.1056/NEJMc1804810. hdl:11245.1/50716fae-c7d0-422a-97c6-a2ba80648ecd.
- Bos, HMW, Kuyper, L, & Gartrell, NK (2017). A population-based comparison of female and male same-sex parent and different-sex parent households. Family Process, doi: 10.1111/famp.12278.
- Bos, H.M.W., Knox, J.R., van Rijn-van Gelderen, L., Gartrell, N.K. (2016) Same-Sex and Different-Sex Parent Households and Child Health Outcomes: Findings from the National Survey of Children's Health, Journal of Developmental & Behavioral Pediatrics, Volume 37, Issue 3, 1–9.
- van Rijn-van Gelderen, L., Bos, H.M.W., & Gartrell, N. (2015) Dutch adolescents from lesbian-parent families: How do they compare to peers with heterosexual parents and what is the impact of homophobic stigmatization?, Journal of Adolescence, 40, 65–73.
- Gartrell, N., Bos, H., Goldberg, N., Deck, A., van Rijn-van Gelderen. (2014). Satisfaction with known, open-identity, or unknown sperm donors: reports from lesbian mothers of 17-year-old adolescents. Fertility and Sterility.
- Bos, H., van Gelderen, L., Gartrell, N. (2014) Lesbian and Heterosexual Two-Parent Families: Adolescent–Parent Relationship Quality and Adolescent Well-Being. Journal of Child and Family Studies. DOI: 10.1007/s10826-014-9913-8.
- Bos H, Gartrell N, van Gelderen L. (2013) Adolescents in Lesbian Families: DSM-Oriented Scale Scores and Stigmatization. Journal of Gay & Lesbian Social Services, 25:2, 121–140.
- Van Gelderen, L., Gartrell, N., Bos, H.M.W., Hermanns, J. (2013). Stigmatization and Promotive Factors in Relation to Psychological Health and Life Satisfaction of Adolescents in Planned Lesbian Families. Journal of Family Issues, 34, 809–827. doi: 10.1177/0192513X12447269
- Gartrell N, Bos H, Peyser H, et al. (2012) Adolescents with Lesbian Mothers Describe Their Own Lives. Journal of Homosexuality, 59:9, 1211–1229.
- Bos H, Goldberg N, van Gelderen L, Gartrell N. (2012) Male Role Models, Gender Role Traits, and Psychological Adjustment. Gender & Society. DOI: 10.1177/0891243212445465.
- van Gelderen, L, Bos H, Gartrell N, et al. (2012) Quality of Life of Adolescents Raised from Birth by Lesbian Mothers. Journal of Developmental & Behavioral Pediatrics. 33(1):1-7.
- Gartrell N, Bos H, Goldberg N. (2011) New Trends in Same-Sex Sexual Contact for American Adolescents? Archives of Sexual Behavior. DOI 10.1007/s10508-011-9883-5.
- Gartrell N, Bos H, Peyser, H, et al. (2011) Family Characteristics, Custody Arrangements, and Adolescent Psychological Well-being after Lesbian Mothers Break Up. Family Relations. 60:572-585. doi:10.1111/j.1741-3729.2011.00667.x.
- Goldberg NG, Bos HMW, Gartrell NK. (2011) Substance use by adolescents of the USA national longitudinal lesbian family study. Journal of Health Psychology. doi:10.1177/1359105311403522.
- Bos H.M.W, Gartrell N.K (2010) Adolescents of the US National Longitudinal Lesbian Family Study: the impact of having a known or an unknown donor on the stability of psychological adjustment. Human Reproduction. doi:10.1093/humrep/deq359.
- Gartrell N, Bos H, Goldberg N. (2010) Adolescents of the U.S. National Longitudinal Lesbian Family Study: Sexual Orientation, Sexual Behavior, and Sexual Risk Exposure. Archives of Sexual Behavior. doi:10.1007/s10508-010-9692-2.
- Bos H, Gartrell N. (2010) Adolescents of the USA National Longitudinal Lesbian Family Study: Can Family Characteristics Counteract the Negative Effects of Stigmatization? Family Process. 49:559–572.
- Gartrell N, Bos H. (2010) US National Longitudinal Lesbian Family Study: Psychological Adjustment of 17-Year-Old Adolescents. Pediatrics. 126(1):1-9.
- Van Gelderen L, Gartrell N, Bos H, et al. (2009) Stigmatization and resilience in adolescent children of lesbian mothers. Journal of GLBT Family Studies. 5(3):268-279.
- Bos HMW, Gartrell NK, Peyser H, et al. (2008) The USA national longitudinal lesbian family study: Homophobia, psychological adjustment, and protective factors. Journal of Lesbian Studies. 12(4):455-471.
- Bos HMW, Gartrell N, Van Balen F, Peyser H, et al. (2008) Children in planned lesbian families: A cross-cultural comparison between the USA and the Netherlands. American Journal of Orthopsychiatry. 78(2):211-219.
- Gartrell N, Rodas C, Deck A, et al. (2006) The USA national lesbian family study: 5. Interviews with mothers of ten-year-olds. Feminism & Psychology. 16(2):175-192.
- Gartrell N, Deck A, Rodas C, et al. (2005) The national lesbian family study: 4. Interviews with the 10-year-old children. American Journal of Orthopsychiatry. 75:518-524.
- Gartrell N, Banks A, Reed N, Hamilton J, et al. (2000) The national lesbian family study: 3. Interviews with mothers of five-year-olds. American Journal of Orthopsychiatry. 70:542-548.
- Gartrell N, Banks A, Hamilton J, et al. (1999) The national lesbian family study: 2. Interviews with mothers of toddlers. American Journal of Orthopsychiatry. 69:362-369.
- Gartrell N, Hamilton J, Banks A, et al. (1996) The national lesbian family study: 1. Interviews with prospective mothers. American Journal of Orthopsychiatry. 66:272-281.
- Gartrell NK, Milliken N, Goodson 3rd WH, Thiemann S, Lo B. Physician-patient sexual contact. Prevalence and problems. Western Journal of Medicine. 1992 Aug;157(2):139.

=== Books ===
In 2008, Gartrell published My Answer Is No ... If That's Okay with You, a book written to help women learn to say "no" with confidence. The book featured interviews with successful and prominent women, including former Supreme Court Justice Sandra Day O'Connor, international AIDS activist Mary Fisher, best-selling author Danielle Steel, President of the Center for the Advancement of Women Faye Wattleton, Wall Street Journal contributing editor Peggy Noonan, breast cancer surgeon Susan Love, former First Lady Barbara Bush, and others. As part of the promotion for the book, Gartrell appeared on Good Morning America, and was interviewed for numerous radio and TV programs around the United States.

Gartrell is also the editor of Bringing Ethics Alive: Feminist Ethics in Psychotherapy Practice (1994), and the co-editor of Everyday Mutinies (2001).

Gartrell was a contributor to all editions of the book The Dangerous Case of Donald Trump, beginning in 2017.

== Awards and honors ==
- (2008) One of the Ten Most Powerful Lesbian Doctors, Curve magazine.
- (2008) American Psychological Association (Division 44) Distinguished Scientific Contribution Award.
- (2010) Pediatrics publication by Drs. Gartrell and Bos cited as one of top 100 science stories of the year by Discover magazine.
- (2013) Association of Women Psychiatrists Presidential Commendation Award, American Psychiatric Association
- (2014) Drs. Gartrell and Mosbacher were the co-recipients of the Mathew O. Tobriner Public Service award from the Legal Aid Society, Employment Law Center.
- (2014) Gay and Lesbian Medical Association Achievement Award.
- (2017) Included in United Kingdom LGBTQ history posters.
- (2020) Alexandra Symonds Award, American Psychiatric Association, for contributions to women's health and the advancement of women.
- (2023) John E. Fryer Award, American Psychiatric Association, for contributing to the health of sexual minorities.
- (2025) Ellen C. Perrin Award of Excellence in LGBTQ+ Health and Wellness, American Academy of Pediatrics.

== Personal life ==
Gartrell is married to Dee Mosbacher MD, Ph.D., a documentary filmmaker whose film Straight From the Heart was nominated for an Academy Award in 1995. The two live together in San Francisco, California.

Gartrell's 20th birthday coincided with the start of the Stonewall riots, which are generally acknowledged to mark the beginning of the modern gay rights movement in the United States. Since then, she has enjoyed pretending that the annual Pride parades in San Francisco were held to celebrate her birthday.
