= Penn State Lady Lions basketball =

Women's basketball team of Penn State University

Penn State Lady Lions
2026–27 Penn State Lady Lions basketball team
- University: Pennsylvania State University
- First season: 1965
- Athletic director: Pat Kraft
- Head coach: Tanisha Wright (1st season)
- Location: University Park, Pennsylvania
- Arena: Bryce Jordan Center (capacity: 15,261)
- Conference: Big Ten Conference
- Nickname: Lady Lions
- Colors: Blue and white

NCAA Division I tournament Final Four
- 2000
Other NCAA Division I tournament results
Elite Eight	1983, 1994, 2000, 2004
Sweet Sixteen	1982, 1983, 1985, 1986, 1992, 1994, 1996, 2000, 2002, 2003, 2004, 2012, 2014
Appearances	1982, 1983, 1984, 1985, 1986, 1987, 1988, 1990, 1991, 1992, 1993, 1994, 1995, 1996, 1999, 2000, 2001, 2002, 2003, 2004, 2005, 2011, 2012, 2013, 2014

AIAW tournament appearances
- 1976

Conference tournament champions
- 1983, 1984, 1985, 1986, 1990, 1991, 1995, 1996

Conference regular-season champions
- 1985, 1986, 1991, 1994, 1995, 2000, 2003, 2004, 2012, 2013, 2014

Uniforms
Home	Away

The Penn State Lady Lions basketball team represents Pennsylvania State University and plays its home games in the Bryce Jordan Center. In 2013, the Lady Lions became just the 12th program in NCAA Division I history to reach 850 wins. Penn State has won 8 regular season Big Ten titles and the first 2 Big Ten tournament titles in 1995 and 1996. Prior to joining the Big Ten, the Lady Lions competed in the Atlantic 10 conference. The Lady Lions have 25 NCAA tournament appearances as of 2014, the most in the Big Ten. The team's best post-season finish came in 2000 when the Lady Lions reached the Final Four before losing to eventual champion UConn. The Lady Lions captured the WNIT title in 1998 defeating Baylor 59–56 in Waco, Texas. Notable alumni include WBCA First Team All-Americans Suzie McConnell, Susan Robinson, Helen Darling, and Kelly Mazzante. ESPN correspondent Lisa Salters is the shortest player in Lady Lions history at 5'-2".

== Current coaching staff ==
Position	Name	Year	Alma mater
Head coach	Tanisha Wright	2026	Penn State (2005)
Assistant coach/General Manager	Jason Crafton	2025	Nyack (2003)
Assistant coach	Kelly Mazzante	2026	Penn State (2004)
Assistant coach	Octavia Blue	2026	Miami (FL) (1998)
Assistant coach/Video coordinator	Oliver Cadet	2026	UCF (2022)

== Pink Zone at Penn State ==
Annually, the Lady Lions don pink jerseys in support of several organizations that fight breast cancer in what is now known as the "Pink Zone at Penn State" game. The Lady Lions were the first Division I team in the nation to wear pink jerseys, a growing trend in athletics. Then-head coach Rene Portland developed the idea in 2006 with money from the Big Ten Conference, and the first game (termed the "Think Pink" game) occurred in February 2007 against Wisconsin. In 2012, the Pink Zone at Penn State raised a record $203,000 to distribute to its beneficiaries.

== All-time season results ==
Statistics overview
Season	Coach	Overall	Conference	Standing	Postseason
Marie Litner (Independent) (1965–1970)
1965	Marie Litner	3–1			
1966	Marie Litner	3–2			
1967	Marie Litner	2–3			
1968	Marie Litner	4–2			
1969	Marie Litner	3–3			
1970	Marie Litner	5–1			
Marie Litner:		20–12			
Mary Ann Domitrovitz (Independent) (1971–1974)
1971	Mary Ann Domitrovitz	6–2			
1972	Mary Ann Domitrovitz	4–3			
1973	Mary Ann Domitrovitz	3–5			
1974	Mary Ann Domitrovitz	5–3			
Mary Ann Domitrovitz:		17–13			
Pat Meiser (Independent) (1974–1980)
1974–75	Pat Meiser	7–7			EAIAW Mid-Atlantic Tournament
1975–76	Pat Meiser	10–10			AIAW First Round
1976–77	Pat Meiser	13–8			EAIAW Mid-Atlantic Tournament
1977–78	Pat Meiser	21–5			EAIAW Mid-Atlantic Tournament
1978–79	Pat Meiser	21–8			EAIAW Mid-Atlantic Tournament
1979–80	Pat Meiser	20–14			EAIAW Mid-Atlantic Tournament
Pat Meiser:		92–52			
Rene Portland (Independent, Atlantic 10 (1982–1991), Big Ten (1992–Present)) (1980–2007)
1980–81	Rene Portland	19–9			EAIAW Mid-Atlantic Tournament
1981–82	Rene Portland	24–6			NCAA Sweet Sixteen
Atlantic 10 Conference
1982–83	Rene Portland	26–7			NCAA Sweet Sixteen
1983–84	Rene Portland	19–12	6–2	2nd	NCAA first round
1984–85	Rene Portland	28–5	7–1	1st (tie)	NCAA Sweet Sixteen
1985–86	Rene Portland	24–8	12–4	1st (tie)	NCAA Sweet Sixteen
1986–87	Rene Portland	23–7	16–2	2nd	NCAA second round
1987–88	Rene Portland	20–13	11–7	4th	NCAA second round
1988–89	Rene Portland	14–14	12–6	4th	
1989–90	Rene Portland	25–7	15–3	3rd	NCAA second round
1990–91	Rene Portland	29–2	17–1	1st	NCAA second round
Independent
1991–92	Rene Portland	24–7			NCAA Sweet Sixteen
Big Ten Conference
1992–93	Rene Portland	22–6	14–4	3rd	NCAA second round
1993–94	Rene Portland	28–3	16–2	1st	NCAA Elite Eight
1994–95	Rene Portland	26–5	13–3	1st	NCAA second round
1995–96	Rene Portland	27–7	13–3	2nd	NCAA Sweet Sixteen
1996–97	Rene Portland	15–12	8–8	6th	
1997–98	Rene Portland	21–13	8–8	7th	WNIT Champions
1998–99	Rene Portland	22–8	12–4	2nd	NCAA second round
1999-00	Rene Portland	30–5	15–1	1st	NCAA Final Four
2000–01	Rene Portland	19–10	11–5	4th	NCAA first round
2001–02	Rene Portland	23–12	11–5	2nd	NCAA Sweet Sixteen
2002–03	Rene Portland	26–9	13–3	1st	NCAA Sweet Sixteen
2003–04	Rene Portland	28–6	15–1	1st	NCAA Elite Eight
2004–05	Rene Portland	19*-11	13–3	3rd	NCAA first round
2005–06	Rene Portland	13–16	6–10	7th	
2006–07	Rene Portland	15–16	7–9	5th	
Rene Portland:		606*-236	271–95		
Coquese Washington (Big Ten) (2007–2019)
2007–08	Coquese Washington	13–18	4–14	10th	
2008–09	Coquese Washington	11–18	6–12	7th	
2009–10	Coquese Washington	17–14	8–10	6th	WNIT First Round
2010–11	Coquese Washington	25–10	11–5	2nd	NCAA second round
2011–12	Coquese Washington	26–7	13–3	1st	NCAA Sweet Sixteen
2012–13	Coquese Washington	26–6	14–2	1st	NCAA second round
2013–14	Coquese Washington	24–8	13–3	1st	NCAA Sweet Sixteen
2014–15	Coquese Washington	6–24	3–15	13th	
2015–16	Coquese Washington	12–19	6–12	11th	
2016–17	Coquese Washington	21-11	9-7	7th	WNIT Third Round
2017–18	Coquese Washington	16-16	6-10	11th	WNIT First round
2018–19	Coquese Washington	12-18	5-13	12th	
Coquese Washington:		209–169	98–111		
Carolyn Kieger (Big Ten) (2019–2026)
2019–20	Carolyn Kieger	7–23	1–17	14th	
2020–21	Carolyn Kieger	9–15	6–13	11th	
2021–22	Carolyn Kieger	11–18	5–13	12th	
2022–23	Carolyn Kieger	14–17	4–14	T–12th	
2023–24	Carolyn Kieger	22–13	9–9	T–6th	WBIT Semifinals
2024–25	Carolyn Kieger	10–19	1–17	18th	
2025–26	Carolyn Kieger	11–18	4–14	16th	
Carolyn Kieger:		84–123	30–97		
Tanisha Wright (Big Ten) (2026–Present)
2026–27	Tanisha Wright	0–0	0–0		
Tanisha Wright:		0–0	0–0		
Total:		1,028–605 (.630)			
National champion Postseason invitational champion Conference regular season champion Conference regular season and conference tournament champion Division regular season champion Division regular season and conference tournament champion Conference tournament champion

* The Lady Lions finished 19–11 in 2004–05, but three wins were credited to assistant head coach Annie Troyan.

== Postseason results ==
=== NCAA Division I ===
The Lady Lions have appeared the NCAA Division I women's basketball tournament 25 times. They have a record of 32–25.

Year	Seed	Round	Opponent	Result
1982	#4	First Round; Sweet Sixteen	#5 Clemson #1 USC	W 96–75; L 70–73
1983	#5	First Round; Sweet Sixteen; Elite Eight	#4 NC State #1 Cheyney #2 Old Dominion	W 94–80; W 73–72; L 60–74
1984	#8	First Round	#1 Old Dominion	L 65–87
1985	#3	First Round; Sweet Sixteen	#6 UNC #2 Ohio State	W 98–79; L 78–81
1986	#3	First Round; Sweet Sixteen	#6 NC State #2 Rutgers	W 63–59; L 72–85
1987	#5	First Round	#4 Ole Miss	L 75–80
1988	#9	First Round; Second Round	#8 La Salle #1 Auburn	W 86–85; L 66–94
1990	#7	First Round; Second Round	#10 Florida State #2 Virginia	W 83–73; L 64–85
1991	#1	Second Round	#8 James Madison	L 71–73
1992	#3	Second Round; Sweet Sixteen	#11 DePaul #2 Ole Miss	W 77–54; L 72–75
1993	#3	Second Round	#6 Georgetown	L 67–68
1994	#1	First Round; Second Round; Sweet Sixteen; Elite Eight	#16 Fordham #9 Kansas #4 Seton Hall #6 Alabama	W 94–41; W 85–68; W 64–60; L 82–96
1995	#2	First Round; Second Round	#15 Jackson State #7 NC State	W 75–62; L 74–76
1996	#2	First Round; Second Round; Sweet Sixteen	#15 Youngstown State #10 Kent State #6 Auburn	W 94–71; W 86–59; L 69–75
1999	#8	First Round; Second Round	#9 Virginia #1 Louisiana Tech	W 82–69; L 62–79
2000	#2	First Round; Second Round; Sweet Sixteen; Elite Eight; Final Four	#15 Youngstown State #7 Auburn #3 Iowa State #1 Louisiana Tech #1 Connecticut	W 83–63; W 75–69; W 66–65; W 86–65; L 67–89
2001	#6	First Round	#11 TCU	L 75–77
2002	#4	First Round; Second Round; Sweet Sixteen	#13 Chattanooga #5 FIU #1 Connecticut	W 82–67; W 96–79; L 64–82
2003	#4	First Round; Second Round; Sweet Sixteen	#13 Holy Cross #5 South Carolina #1 Tennessee	W 64–33; W 77–67; L 58–86
2004	#1	First Round; Second Round; Sweet Sixteen; Elite Eight	#16 Hampton #8 Virginia Tech #5 Notre Dame #2 Connecticut	W 79–42; W 61–48; W 55–49; L 49–66
2005	#4	First Round	#13 Liberty	L 70–78
2011	#6	First Round; Second Round	#11 Dayton #3 DePaul	W 75–66; L 73–75
2012	#4	First Round; Second Round; Sweet Sixteen	#13 UTEP #5 LSU #1 Connecticut	W 85–77; W 90–80; L 59–77
2013	#3	First Round; Second Round	#14 Cal Poly #6 LSU	W 85–55; L 66–71
2014	#3	First Round; Second Round; Sweet Sixteen	#14 Wichita State #11 Florida #2 Stanford	W 62–56; W 83–61; L 57–82

=== AIAW Division I ===
The Nittany Lions made one appearance in the AIAW National Division I basketball tournament, with a combined record of 0–2.

Year	Round	Opponent	Result
1976	First Round; Consolation First Round	Delta State; Southern Connecticut State	L, 46–88; L, 51–63

== Awards and honors ==
=== Atlantic 10 awards ===
- Atlantic 10 Player of the Year
  - Kahadeejah Herbert, 1985
  - Susan Robinson, 1991
- Atlantic 10 Freshman of the Year
  - Suzie McConnell, 1985
  - Susan Robinson, 1989
  - Helen Holloway, 1991
- Atlantic 10 Coach of the Year
  - Rene Portland, 1983

=== Big Ten awards ===
- Suzy Favor Big Ten Female Student-Athlete of the Year
  - Kelly Mazzante, 2004
- Big Ten Defensive Player of the Year
  - Tanisha Wright, 2003, 2004, 2005
  - Dara Taylor, 2014
- Chicago Tribune Silver Basketball
  - Helen Darling, 2000
  - Kelly Mazzante, 2003, 2004
- Big Ten Player of the Year
  - Helen Darling, 2000
  - Kelly Mazzante, 2003, 2004
  - Maggie Lucas, 2013, 2014
- Big Ten Freshman of the Year
  - Kelly Mazzante, 2001
  - Maggie Lucas, 2011
- Big Ten Sixth Player of the Year
  - Maggie Lucas, 2011
- Big Ten Coach of the Year
  - Rene Portland, 1994, 2000, 2003, 2004
  - Coquese Washington, 2012, 2013, 2014

=== National and regional awards ===
==== Wade Trophy ====
- 1992, Susan Robinson

==== Frances Pomeroy Naismith Award ====
- 1988, Suzie McConnell
- 2000, Helen Darling
- 2013, Alex Bentley

==== CoSIDA Academic All-American of the Year ====
- 2004, Kelly Mazzante

==== Eastern College Athletic Conference Player of the Year ====
- 1991, Susan Robinson

==== WBCA Coach of the Year ====
- 1991, Rene Portland
- 2004, Rene Portland

==== USBWA Coach of the Year ====
- 1991, Rene Portland
- 1992, Rene Portland

==== Black Coaches & Administrators Female Coach of the Year ====
- 2011, Coquese Washington
- 2013, Coquese Washington
