= Straight from the Heart (1994 film) =

1994 film

- Film poster
- Directed by: Dee Mosbacher; Frances Reid
- Produced by: Dee Mosbacher; Frances Reid
- Production company: Woman Vision
- Release date: 1994
- Running time: 24 minutes
- Country: United States
- Language: English

Straight from the Heart is a 1994 American short documentary film directed by Dee Mosbacher and co-directed by Frances Reid. It was nominated for an Academy Award for Best Documentary Short.
