= Fawn Yacker =

American filmmaker, producer and cinematographer

Fawn Yacker is an American filmmaker, producer, and cinematographer. She also co-found the LGBT organization "The Last Closet".

== About ==
In 2009, she co-wrote, co-produced and co-directed with director Dee Mosbacher a one-hour documentary film entitled Training Rules, about the controversial women's basketball program ran by Rene Portland at Pennsylvania State University collegiate sports. Fawn Yacker is a founding member of The Nuclear Beauty Parlor.

She co-founded the LGBT organization "The Last Closet", with the goal of ending homophobia in men's professional athletics and providing support.

Yacker is credited on several films directed by Oscar-winner Debra Chasnoff, including: Deadly Deception: General Electric, Nuclear Weapons and Our Environment (1991), It's Elementary: Talking About Gay Issues in School (1996), Let's Get Real (2006), It's Still Elementary (2007), and Straightlaced: How Gender's Got Us All Tied Up (2009) as a cinematographer, and That's a Family! (2000) as a co-producer.

== Filmography ==
=== Director ===
- 2009: Training Rules - co-director with Dee Mosbacher

=== Producer ===
- 2000: That's a Family! - co-producer with Debra Chasnoff, and Ariella J. Ben-Dov.
- 2009: Training Rules - co-producer with Dee Mosbacher

=== Cinematographer ===
- 1983: Sippie
- 1987: Chuck Solomon: Coming of Age
- 1989: Sacred Passion (V)
- 1991: Deadly Deception: General Electric, Nuclear Weapons and Our Environment
- 1993: Sex Is...
- 1996: It's Elementary: Talking About Gay Issues in School
- 2006: Let's Get Real
- 2005: Waging a Living
- 2007: It's Still Elementary (V) (a.k.a. It's Still Elementary: The Movie and the Movement
- 2009: Training Rules
- 2009: Straightlaced: How Gender's Got Us All Tied Up
