= Echelon Magazine =

American online publication

Echelon Magazine is an American online publication serving LGBT business professionals. It once included biographical profiles of corporate executives and entrepreneurs, as well as features on businesses involving the LGBT community.

== History ==
The gay and lesbian publication Victory! was briefly published in the 1990s. Echelon was first published in January 2004 by Michael Lamb. The magazine participated in an October 8, 2004 protest for equality. The bimonthly magazine sought to highlight the successes of gay and lesbian professionals. It was modeled after business magazines covering women, African-Americans, and Asian-Americans. Contents included tips on finance, job hunting, and business development for entrepreneurs, as well as coverage of the business environment for gays in various US cities. The magazine was funded by private investors. Lamb created Echelon Business Media Inc. in 2007, and added sites including GayFranchise.com and GoGayBiz.com. Print publication ceased in 2009, to be replaced by website and Facebook presences.
