= Dee Mosbacher =

American documentary filmmaker

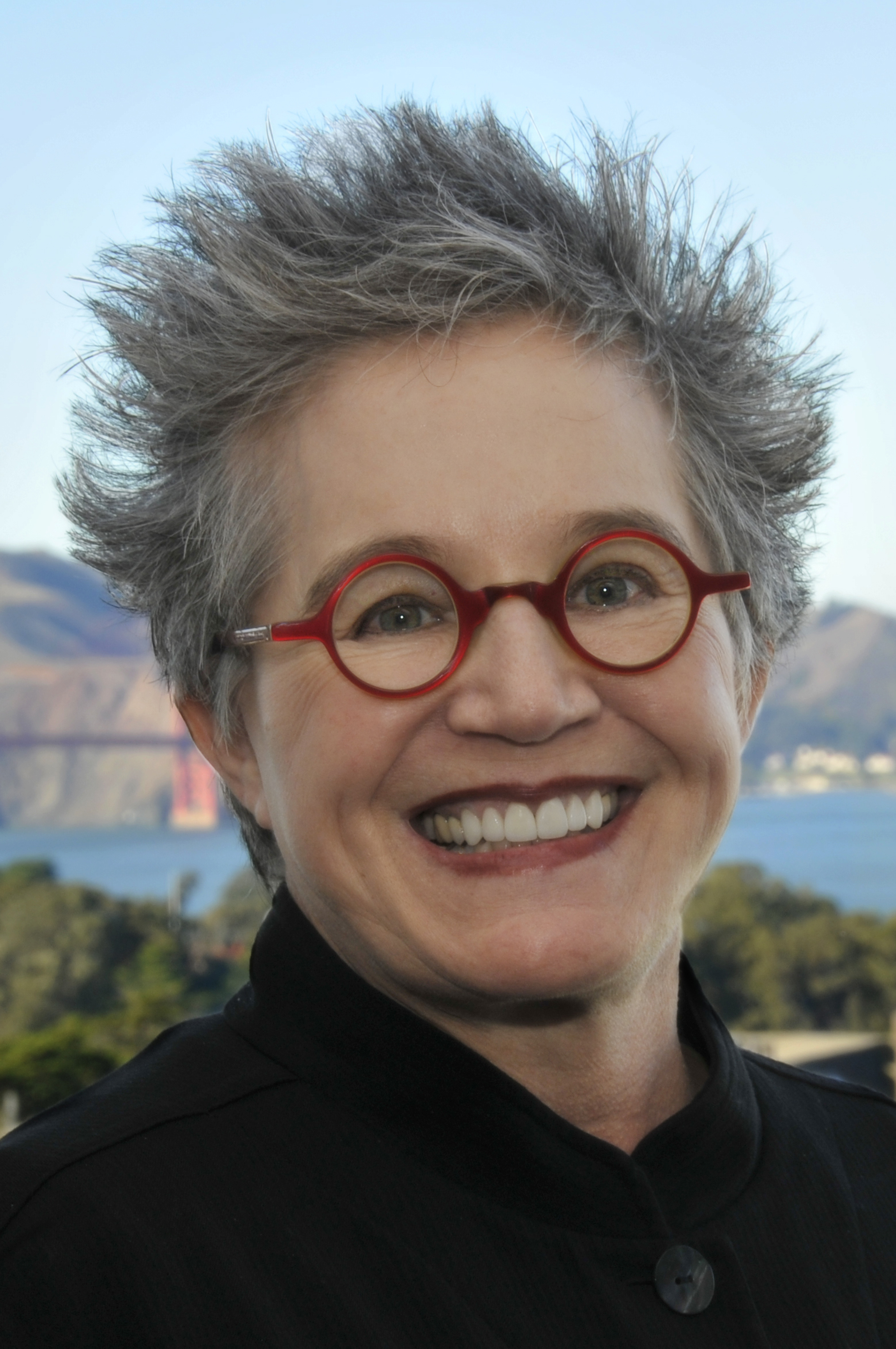
- Mosbacher in 2013
- Born: Diane Mosbacher; 1949 (age 76–77); Houston, Texas, U.S.
- Education: Pitzer College (BA); Union Institute and University (MA, PhD); Baylor College of Medicine (MD)
- Occupations: Filmmaker, activist, psychiatrist
- Years active: 1993–present
- Notable work: Straight from the Heart
- Spouse: Nanette Gartrell (m. 2005)
- Parents: Robert Mosbacher (father); Jane Pennybacker (mother)
- Relatives: Robert Mosbacher Jr. (brother)

Diane "Dee" Mosbacher (born 1949) is an American filmmaker, lesbian feminist activist, and practicing psychiatrist. In 1993, she founded Woman Vision, a nonprofit organization.

== Early life and education ==
Born in Houston, Texas, Mosbacher is the daughter of the late Jane Pennybacker Mosbacher and Robert Mosbacher (1927–2010), who served as U.S. Secretary of Commerce under George H. W. Bush from 1989 to 1992. She has two sisters and a brother.

Mosbacher and her father had a close relationship despite the Republican Party's largely anti-gay position. In 1992, on a day when the two were both giving commencement speeches, she told a reporter for The Washington Post that she began her speech: "Dad and I had breakfast this morning. We looked at each other's speeches. He would have used mine but he's not a lesbian. I would have used his, but I'm not a Republican." Mosbacher spoke out against the gay-bashing and anti-woman focus of the Republican Party's 1992 campaign.

Mosbacher earned a bachelor's degree in psychology from Pitzer College in Claremont, California, a doctorate in social psychology from Union Graduate School, and a medical degree from Baylor College of Medicine.

== Career ==
Mosbacher was a medical intern at Cambridge Hospital through Harvard Medical School from 1983 to 1984 and was a psychiatry resident in the same hospital from 1984 to 1987.

She became a women's health activist in college and began directing documentary films as a student at Baylor College and as a resident at Harvard Medical School. Her films focused on discrimination against lesbian and gay physicians and patients, and she wrote many articles about gay and lesbian patients for the academic and medical community.

=== Woman Vision ===
In 1992, Dee Mosbacher founded the non-profit production company Woman Vision to counteract the media campaign on LGBT issues conducted by the Republican Party, which was the focus of the 1992 Republican National Convention.

As of 2009, Mosbacher has directed or produced nine documentary films through Woman Vision, each having to do with LGBTQ or women's rights issues. In 1994, she directed and produced Straight From the Heart, which was nominated for an Academy Award.

=== Oscar nomination for Straight from the Heart ===
In 1995, Mosbacher co-directed and co-produced (with Frances Reid) Straight From the Heart, a documentary that explored relationships between heterosexual parents and their adult lesbian and gay children. The film was nominated for an Oscar in the Documentary (Short Subject) category.

=== Training Rules ===
In 2009, Mosbacher co-directed and co-produced with Fawn Yacker the documentary film Training Rules, an hour-long movie about Rene Portland, a women's basketball coach from Penn State University. Portland allegedly banned lesbians from playing on her team. The film contains interviews with former athletes and faculty members at Penn State who say that Portland actively pursued and harassed members of her team whom she suspected were gay.

=== Affiliations ===
From 1994 to 2002, Mosbacher served on the Pitzer College Board of Trustees. In 2011, she established the Mosbacher Fund for Media Studies and the Mosbacher/Gartrell Center for Media Experimentation and Activism at Pitzer College.

=== The Last Closet ===
In 2012, Woman Vision launched The Last Closet, a web-based campaign and video project to end homophobia in men's professional sports.

== Awards ==
- 1992: Creating Change Award, from the National Gay and Lesbian Task Force
- 1995: Jerry E. Berg Leadership Award, from the Human Rights Campaign Fund
- 1997: Liberty Award, from Lambda Legal Defense
- 2009: Barbara Gittings Memorial Award, from Equality Forum
- 2014: Mathew O. Tobriner Public Service Award, from the Legal Aid Society (San Francisco), Employment Law Center

In 1991, Dee Mosbacher was the first Pitzer College graduate to deliver a commencement address at her alma mater. In 2010, she established the Mosbacher/Gartrell Center for Media Experimentation and Activism at Pitzer College.

== Personal life ==
Mosbacher is married to Nanette Gartrell, a researcher, psychiatrist, and author.

== Filmography ==
- 1985: Closets are Health Hazards: Gay and Lesbian Physicians Come Out - Director/Producer
- 1991: Lesbians on Practice, Patients, and Power - Director/Producer
- 1994: Straight From the Heart - Director/Producer (with Frances Reid and Deborah Hoffman)
- 1995: Out for a Change: Addressing Homophobia in Women's Sports - Director/Producer
- 1996: All God's Children - Director/Producer (with Sylvia Rhue and Frances Reid)
- 2001: De Colores - Executive Producer
- 2002: Radical Harmonies - Director/Producer (with Boden Sandstrom and June Millington)
- 2006: No Secret Anymore: The Times of Del Martin and Phyllis Lyon - Producer (with Joan E. Biren)
- 2009: Training Rules - Director/Producer (with Fawn Yacker)

== See also ==
- List of female film and television directors
- List of lesbian filmmakers
- List of LGBT-related films directed by women
