= Timothy Curley =

American athletic director

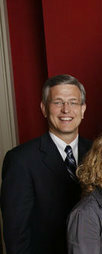
- Born: April 28, 1954 (age 72)
- Occupation: Athletic director
- Years active: 1993–2011
- Employer: Penn State Nittany Lions
- Conviction: Child endangerment
- Penalty: 7- to 23-month jail term

Timothy M. Curley (born April 28, 1954) is a former athletic director for Penn State University.

== Career ==
Curley was appointed athletic director on December 30, 1993. He succeeded Jim Tarman, for whom he had served as an assistant. During his 18 years as athletic director, Penn State won 18 national championships and 64 Big Ten titles.

Curley drew criticism for his handling of allegations of anti-gay discrimination by Penn State women's basketball coach Rene Portland. Curley and Portland were sued by a former player who alleged that Portland had actively discriminated against players who were lesbian or perceived to be lesbian. Portland was ultimately fined by the university after the allegations came to light.

== Child sex abuse scandal ==
In 2011, former Penn State football assistant coach Jerry Sandusky was arrested and indicted on 40 counts of child molestation dating back to 1994. During the grand jury investigation, Curley had testified as to his awareness of a 2002 incident that occurred in the Penn State football locker room, in which assistant coach Mike McQueary testified he witnessed Sandusky raping a 10-year-old boy in the shower. McQueary notified head coach Joe Paterno, who brought the matter to Curley's attention.

Curley testified that he had only been told that Sandusky was "horsing around" with the boy. Curley, along with Penn State Vice President Gary Schultz, did not report the incident to police, and their discipline of Sandusky was limited to restricting him from bringing underage children to campus.

The grand jury investigating Sandusky ultimately did not find Curley's testimony credible, and indicted him and Schultz for perjury and for failing to report possible abuse. After the indictment, Curley and Schultz were suspended from their duties. University President Graham Spanier issued a statement expressing support for both men that said: "Tim Curley and Gary Schultz operate at the highest levels of honesty, integrity and compassion." Spanier was forced to resign by the school's Board of Trustees on November 9, 2011, in part because of this statement.

The report of an independent investigation conducted by former FBI director Louis Freeh and his firm stated that Curley, along with Schultz, Spanier and Paterno, had knowledge of past abuse allegations against Sandusky and concealed them, concluding that they "failed to protect against a child sexual predator harming children for over a decade".

Curley was placed on administrative leave pending trial. On October 16, 2012, Penn State announced it would not renew Curley's contract when it expired in June 2013.

On November 1, 2012, Pennsylvania Attorney General Linda Kelly announced that a grand jury had returned a superseding indictment against Curley and Schultz. The indictment added additional charges of child endangerment, obstruction of justice and conspiracy. Spanier was also indicted for allegedly covering up Sandusky's crimes.

On July 30, 2013, Curley was ordered by Judge William Wenner to stand trial on charges accusing them of a cover-up.

On March 13, 2017, Curley and Schultz each pled guilty to child endangerment charges in exchange for the dismissal of the conspiracy charges against them. Both men, however, later testified against Spanier, who, in a split verdict, was convicted of one charge of child endangerment, but also acquitted of the charge of conspiracy and another charge of child endangerment as well.

On June 3, 2017, Curley was sentenced to a 7- to 23-month jail term, with the last four months of his sentence being served on house arrest. He also received two years of probation and a $5,000 fine. The judge gave Curley the harshest sentence out of the three defendants. Judge John Boccabella was skeptical of Curley's testimony during Spanier's trial when he could not recall conversations related to the decision on to inform authorities about Sandusky's behavior. Boccabella also pointed out that he "probably made the most glaring error" due to his control of the football program. He began serving his sentence on July 15, and was released from jail on October 9.
