= Leilehua Lanzilotti =

Kanaka Maoli composer, performer and scholar of contemporary classical music

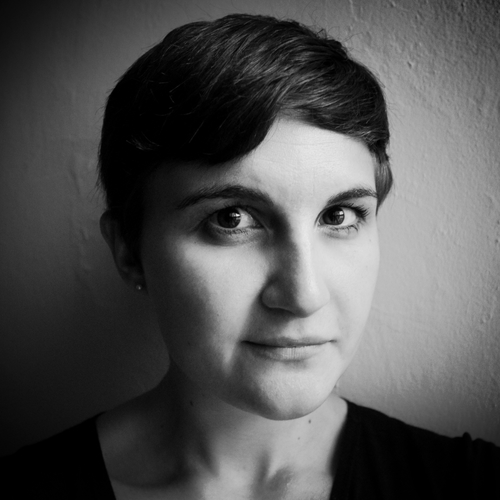
- Born: November 5, 1983 (age 43); Philadelphia, Pennsylvania, U.S.
- Occupations: Musician, Composer
- Notable work: with eyes the color of time
- Relatives: Samuel Pailthorpe King (grandfather), Samuel Wilder King (great-grandfather)
- Website: leilehualanzilotti.com

Leilehua Lanzilotti (born November 5, 1983), is a Kanaka Maoli composer, multimedia artist, curator, performer, and scholar of contemporary classical music.

== Early life and education ==
Lanzilotti grew up in Honolulu, Hawaiʻi. Lanzilotti spent much of her childhood playing in the galleries and gardens of The Contemporary Museum in Honolulu as a child where her mother was Curator of Education. Lanzilotti attended Punahou School and Beijing Normal University Middle School No. 2 (School Year Abroad), and then continued her education at Oberlin College Conservatory of Music, Yale School of Music, and Manhattan School of Music. She was a fellowship violist in both the New World Symphony and the Rundfunk-Sinfonieorchester Berlin.

Lanzilotti is a member of the King family; an influential Kanaka Maoli family from O'ahu. Her great grandfather, Samuel Wilder King, the eleventh territorial governor of Hawaii and the first Kanaka Maoli individual to hold this office, signed the bill that outlawed the death penalty in Hawaii. Her grandfather, Samuel Pailthorpe King, was a United States district judge of the United States District Court for the District of Hawaii, and preceded over several high profile court cases, including the conviction of suspected organized crime leader Wilford Kalaauala "Nappy" Pulawa, the murder trial depicted in the book And the Sea Will Tell, and the ruling "barring federal authorities from using a telescope to peer into a home without a warrant."

== Professional life ==
=== Performance ===
In her early professional life, Lanzilotti was known for her advocacy and interpretation of works living composers such as Dai Fujikura, Andrew Norman, Caroline Shaw, Anna Thorvaldsdottir, Scott Wollschleger, and Nina C. Young. Lanzilotti premiered Dai Fujikura's Viola Concerto, Wayfinder, at the Tokyo Metropolitan Theatre during the 2022 Born Creative Festival.

Lanzilotti's album in manus tuas (New Focus Recordings, 2019), was featured in Bandcamp's The Best Contemporary Classical Albums of 2019 and The Boston Globe Top 10 Classical Albums of 2019. Other albums including Lanzilotti's music are forever forward in search of the beautiful (New Focus Recordings), and Impulse (by violist Jordan Bak, Bright Shiny Things).

In addition to Lanzilotti's work as a soloist performing her own work and the works of others, she has performed as a guest with Alarm Will Sound, Ensemble Éschappé, Ensemble Interface, Ensemble Signal, International Contemporary Ensemble, and with bands such as DeVotchKa, and She & Him. Lanzilotti performed in the Björk Vulnicura Live tour in New York City, and appears on the album of the same name.

Lanzilotti was part of the inaugural cohort of Wehiwehi, a Native Hawaiian contemporary performing artist collective founded by Christopher Kaui Morgan, including members such as Patrick Makuakāne and Moses Goods.

=== Scholarship ===
As an Andrew Norman scholar, Lanzilotti has written for Neue Zeitschrift für Musik, London Symphony Orchestra, and has spoken at conferences internationally on Norman's use of architecture and visual art as musical inspiration. Her doctoral dissertation is also on the topic of music and architecture in Norman's string trio, The Companion Guide to Rome.

Lanzilotti contributed to the monograph Toshiko Takaezu: Worlds Within published by Yale University Press (2024).

Lanzilotti is the creator of Shaken Not Stuttered, a free online resource demonstrating extended techniques for strings.

=== Curation ===
In her role as Curator of Music at The Curtis R. Priem Experimental Media and Performing Arts Center (EMPAC), Lanzilotti invited artists such as Ethan Heard & Heartbeat Opera, Sarah Hennies, Ken Ueno, and in 2020–21 season commissioned Maria Chavez, Lesley Flanigan, Bora Yoon, Pamela Z, Caroline Shaw and choreographer Vanessa Goodman, King Britt and Saul Williams, Miya Masaoka, and Mary Kouyoumdjian and Alarm Will Sound.

Additionally, Lanzilotti co-curated the nationally touring exhibition Toshiko Takaezu: Worlds Within with Glenn Adamson and Kate Weiner.

=== Teaching ===
Lanzilotti has been on the faculty at New York University, University of Northern Colorado, University of Hawaiʻi—Mānoa, and taught at summer programs including Casalmaggiore International Music Festival, Point CounterPoint, Wintergreen Performing Arts, and Banff INTERPLAY. Lanzilotti was co-founder and artistic consultant for Kalikolehua – El Sistema Hawaiʻi.

=== Composition ===
In 2022 Lanzilotti's work with eyes the color of time, commissioned by The String Orchestra of Brooklyn and premiered at Tenri Cultural Institute in New York City, was selected as a Pulitzer Prize Finalist in Music.

Lanzilotti has a body of artistic work related to her research field of the influence of visual art and architecture on musical form, and has been commissioned by The Noguchi Museum several times to write musical chamber works responding to exhibition themes.

Other thematic ideas that recur in her work are language revitalization, such as the project that [Switch~ Ensemble] received a MAP Fund grant for the development and performance of her new work hānau ka ua.

Another strain of her work responds to poetic text, such as the work the water in your body is just visiting, after the poem "Naming the River" by writer and poet Jarod K. Anderson (from his collection Field Guide to the Haunted Forest).

Lanzilotti has also been commissioned by groups such as the New York Philharmonic, Roomful of Teeth, and Sō Percussion. She was a 2021 McKnight Visiting Composer.

Collaborations with scientists include Lanzilotti's works on stochastic wave behavior through a grant from the National Science Foundation for a project led by Professor of Geology and Mineralogy at Williams College Rónadh Cox, and a work as part of Rachel Lee Priday's Fluid Dynamics project in collaboration with ocean scientist Dr. Georgy Manucharyan of UW's School of Oceanography.

Collaborations with dancers include Sinking, a commission for Periapsis Music and Dance with choreographer Wendell Gray II; a new version of with eyes the color of time with additional rattle and bell elements for Dana Tai Soon Burgess Dance Company's work Landscapes, performances with Christopher Kaui Morgan at Shangri La Museum of Islamic Art, Culture & Design and projects with collaborator brooke smiley.

== Music ==
Lanzilotti’s compositions use various timbres and extended techniques. The works focus on sound and the resonance of instruments. A review in Cities & Health stated that some scores use collective sonic gestures.

=== with eyes the color of time ===
with eyes the color of time (2020) for string orchestra was commissioned by the String Orchestra of Brooklyn, and was a finalist for the 2022 Pulitzer Prize in Music. The Pulitzer committee noted that the work "distinctly combines experimental string textures and episodes of melting lyricism." Gramophone described the work “painfully eloquent, there is ecstasy in the raspings of ‘silhouette.’”

with eyes the color of time was inspired by the composer's experience growing up playing in The Contemporary Museum (Spaulding House) in Honolulu where her mother worked when Lanzilotti was a child. The artworks referenced in with eyes the color of time include:

- the bronze doors at the entrance of the museum by Robert Graham
- Two Open Triangles Up, Gyratory III (1988) by George Rickey
- Nahele (1986) by Deborah Butterfield
- Mirror XV (1987) by James Seawright
- Toshiko Takaezu’s moons (a series of sculptures she often referred to by the Hawaiian word, mahina)
- David Hockney’s installation of a set for the opera L’Enfant et les sortilèges by Maurice Ravel.

The title of Lanzilotti's work, with eyes the color of time, comes from a phrase in the Ravel opera.

=== of light and stone ===
of light and stone (2025) was commissioned by the New York Philharmonic for the opening of their 25–26 season. It references songs from the four siblings of the Kalākaua Dynasty—such as the last monarch of Hawaiʻi, Queen Liliʻuokalani—including:

- “Moani Ke Ala” by Prince Leleiōhoku
- “Kuʻu ipo i ka heʻe puʻe one” by Princess Likelike
- “Ahe Lau Makani” by Queen Liliʻuokalani
- “Ke Aloha O Ka Haku” by Queen Liliʻuokalani
- “Mele Lāhui Hawaiʻi” by Queen Liliʻuokalani
- “Hawaiʻi Ponoʻī” words by King Kalākaua and music by Royal Hawaiian Band conductor Henri Berger

The work utilizes Lanzilotti's "vast pallate of orchestration."

== Multimedia Work ==
In both installation work and film, Lanzilotti's multimedia works have been shown at festivals and exhibitions such as Art Electronica (Austria), The Noguchi Museum (USA), and in international collections from residencies such as Casa Wabi (Mexico).

== Awards and honors ==
- Artists Make Technology, Awardee and member of inaugural AMT Lab Cohort, Mozilla Foundation & Doris Duke Foundation, 2026
- United States Artists, 2025 USA Fellow
- Creative Capital Awardee, 2025
- SHIFT — Transformative Change and Indigenous Arts, 2023
- Finalist, Pulitzer Prize in Music, with eyes the color of time, 2022
- OPERA America, Opera Grant for Women Composers: Discovery Grant, 2022
- Fromm Music Foundation Commission Recipient, 2022
- Chamber Music America, Artistic Projects for a new work for Longleash on Toshiko Takaezu’s sculptures, 2022
- First Peoples Fund Artist in Business Leadership Fellowship, 2022
- McKnight Visiting Composer, 2021
- National Performance Network, Creation & Development Fund 2021
- MAP Fund for [Switch~ Ensemble] for development and performance of hānau ka ua, 2020
- Native Launchpad Advancing Indigenous Performance Award, 2020–23

== Discography ==
=== Compositional Discography ===
- India Gailey and Leah Plave: The Way Appears. North Vancouver, BC: Red Shift Records, 2026
- Various Artists: beyond the accident of time. Honolulu, HI: Lōʻihi Records, 2025
- Various Artists: forever forward in search of the beautiful. New York, NY: New Focus Recordings, 2024
- Longleash & Sō Percussion: the sky in our hands, our hands in the sky. Saint Paul, MN: Innova, 2024
- String Orchestra of Brooklyn: enfolding. New York, NY: New Focus Recordings, 2022
- Jordan Bak: Impulse. Bright Shiny Things, 2022
- India Gailey: to you through. North Vancouver, BC: Red Shift Records, 2022
- Adam Morford and Leilehua Lanzilotti: Yesterday is Two Days Ago. Self-release, 2021
- Borderlands Ensemble: the space in which to see. New Focus Recordings, 2021
- Lanzilotti: in manus tuas (New Focus Recordings, 2019)
- The Yes &: Thrush (2017) music by Lanzilotti and Gahlord Dewald
- Lanzilotti: Wanderweg EP (2017) Works for viola(s) and electronics

=== Performing Discography ===
- Dai Fujikura: Wayfinder Viola Concerto on Luminous. Tokyo: Sony Japan, 2025
- Dai Fujikura: Wayfinder Viola Concerto on Wayfinder. Tokyo: Sony Japan, 2023
- Dai Fujikura: Star Compass on Glorious Clouds. Tokyo: Sony Japan, 2021
- Anna Thorvaldsdottir: Sola. New York, NY: New Focus Recordings, 2020
- Jacob Cooper: Terrain (New Amsterdam Records, 2020)
- Ted Hearne: hazy heart pump (New Focus Recordings, 2019)
- David Lang: Anatomy Theater (Cantaloupe Music, 2019)
- Lanzilotti: in manus tuas (New Focus Recordings, 2019)
- Scott Wollschleger: Soft Aberration (New Focus Recordings, 2017)
- Dai Fujikura: Chance Monsoon (Sony Japan & Minabel, 2017)
- Björk: Vulnicura Live (One Little Indian Records, 2015).
- Ted Hearne: The Source (New Amsterdam Records, 2015)
- Joan Osborne: Love and Hate (Womanly Hips, 2014)
- Sean Hickey: Pied A Terre (Delos Productions, Inc., 2014)
- Rundfunk-Sinfonieorchester Berlin: Leoš Janácek – Mša Glagolskaja (Missa Solemnis) & Taras Bulba (Pentatone, 2013)
- Rundfunk-Sinfonieorchester Berlin: Richard Wagner – Parsifal (Pentatone, 2012)
- Rundfunk-Sinfonieorchester Berlin: Richard Wagner – Der fliegende Holländer (Pentatone, 2011)

== Selected compositions ==
- of light and stone for symphony orchestra (2025), commissioned and premiered by the New York Philharmonic with the generous support of Elizabeth & Justus Schlichting
- on stochastic wave behavior eight voices (2021), commissioned by Rónadh Cox, with the support of the National Science Foundation
- with eyes the color of time for string orchestra (2020), commissioned by the String Orchestra of Brooklyn
- find (2019) for viola and electronics, commissioned by Kieran Welch
- beyond the accident of time for percussion and voices (2019), commissioned by The Noguchi Museum, premiered June 13, 2019
- the space in which to see for French horn, violin, viola, and cello (2019), commissioned by Johanna Lundy for the Borderlands Ensemble
- of moments for baritone and baroque violin (2018) commissioned by Jesse Blumberg and Johanna Novom
- to you (the architects are most courageous) for two violins, viola, cello, and piano (2018)
- Postcards II: Akari for viola, voice, harp, and fixed media (2018) Commissioned by The Noguchi Museum, premiered April 6, 2018
- gray for viola and percussion (2017) commissioned by Periapsis Dance & Music
- birth, death, for obsidian sound sculptures, strings, and voice (2017). Commissioned by The Noguchi Museum
- koʻu inoa (2017)
- with their I you your fuse for double bass (2016)

== Selected multimedia work ==
- the sky in our hands, our hands in the sky (2023, single-channel video, 47 minutes, directed by Leilehua Lanzilotti, music by Leilehua Lanzilotti, cinematography by Gahlord Dewald)
- closed form etudes (2023, single-channel video, 15 minutes, directed by Leilehua Lanzilotti, music by Leilehua Lanzilotti, cinematography by Gahlord Dewald)

== Selected publications ==
Written

- "Playing in the Clouds: El Sistema and the Simón Bolívar Symphony Orchestra of Venezuela" (Aimon Mata and Leilehua Lanzilotti in Conversation) in Tuning Calder’s Clouds / Sintonías de las nubes de Calder, edited by Vic Brooks, Jennifer Burris, and Mariana Fernández, published September 1, 2026 in a collaboration between the Calder Foundation, and Athénée Press: Bogotá/Mexico City.
- “Takaezu’s Hidden Landscapes” in Toshiko Takaezu: Worlds Within, a monograph honoring the life and work of Toshiko Takaezu, published by Yale University Press, 2024.
- "Music is Everywhere Steeped in Time," The 20/19 Project Monograph (Studio Will Dutta, 2019)
- "A Trip to the Moon" (London Symphony Orchestra, 2017)
- "Anna Thorvaldsdottir: A Part of Nature" (Music & Literature, 2017)
- "Architektur der Gesellschaft: Der US-Amerikanische Komponist Andrew Norman" (Neue Zeitschrift für Musik, 2017)
- "'Cut to a Different World': Andrew Norman" (Music & Literature, 2016)
- "Andrew Norman's The Companion Guide to Rome: Influence of Architecture and Visual Art on Composition" (DMA Diss, Manhattan School of Music, 2016)

Editions of musical scores

- Sonnets by Andrew Norman, edited by Lanzilotti – viola & piano
- "Josephine (the Singer)" by Martin Bresnick, edited by Lanzilotti – solo viola
