= Sara Holdren =

American critic and director

- Born: 1985-1986
- Education: Yale University (BA); Yale School of Drama (MFA)
- Occupations: Theater critic; Stage director
- Website: saraholdren.com

Sara Holdren (born 1985-1986) is an American theater critic and director. She has been a theater critic for New York magazine since 2023, after having previously served in the role from 2017 to 2019. Holdren has also directed stage shows at the collegiate, graduate, and professional level.

== Early life and education ==
Holdren grew up in Virginia near Charlottesville. She was "raised on Arthur Rackham, The Brothers Grimm, Alice in Wonderland" and the works of William Shakespeare. Holdren's parents were both English students at the University of Virginia.

Holdren received a bachelor's degree in theater from Yale University in 2008. While at Yale, she was a member of The Control Group, an experimental theater troupe where she served as artistic director.

Holdren later received an MFA in directing from Yale School of Drama in 2015. She completed her director's thesis on The Master and Margarita under the faculty advisor Tim Vasen.

== Career ==
=== Theater critic ===
Holdren was named theater critic for New York in July 2017. American Theatre called her hire "something of a wild card." She had never held a post as a critic before and had written only one prominent theater review: an April 2017 pan of a Public Theater production of Joan of Arc: Into the Fire for the website CultureBot. The Joan of Arc review earned Holdren the 2016-2017 George Jean Nathan Award for Dramatic Criticism.

When asked about her critical inspirations, Holdren cited E.M. Forster's "What I Believe," Ursula K. LeGuin's repertoire of essays, and Harold C. Goddard's The Meaning of Shakespeare. She also named John Lahr, Pauline Kael, and Emily Nussbaum as critics she admired.

In September 2019, Holdren announced that she would be stepping down from her position at New York. She later attributed her decision to burnout and her desire to direct more.

Holdren returned to New York in August 2023. Her reviews have been cited in The New York Times, The New York Review of Books, The New York Post, and The London Times. Holdren is a member of the New York Drama Critics' Circle. She has also voted for the Tony Awards.

Holdren was named a finalist for the 2025 Pulitzer Prize in Criticism for her "insightful theater criticism that combines a reporter's eye and a historian's memory to inform readers about current stage productions." Her nominated works included reviews of Stereophonic, The Wind and the Rain, Patriots, and Audra McDonald's Gypsy.

=== Directing ===
Shortly after graduating with her bachelor's degree, Holdren became a production assistant and director in Charlottesville, Virginia, where she was described as a "regular theater presence around town." For the community theater company Charlottesville Live Arts, she directed productions of Henry IV, The Tempest, and He Who Gets Slapped.

Upon her return to Yale in 2013 to complete a MFA, Holdren continued to direct productions, including new plays The Zero Scenario, and Deer and the Lovers. Holdren was also the artistic director for Yale's annual Summer Cabaret in 2015, where she directed an adaptation of Sarah Ruhl's Orlando. Christopher Arnott reviewed it for the New Haven Independent as "an unnecessarily arch staging."

As part of the 2015 Cabaret, Holdren co-adapted and directed Midsummer, a pastiche based on A Midsummer Night's Dream and incorporating text from many of Shakespeare's other plays. Journalist Lucy Gellman wrote that the production "turns Shakespeare’s play joyfully on its head." Holdren directed a revised Midsummer with the theater company Tiltyard—which she co-founded in 2016—for the 2022 Edinburgh Festival Fringe.

In May 2025, Holdren directed and co-adapted Faust for Heartbeat Opera. In The New York Times, Joshua Barone praised Holdren as among the best theater critics in New York, with a "real, exciting theatrical instinct," but concluded that the production was "saturated and impatient." The production also received a mixed review from the Observer.

Holdren teaches at the David Geffen School of Drama at Yale, where she is a lecturer in directing.

== Personal life ==
Holdren married writer Beau Gambold on August 11, 2020 in Charlottesville. She has one child.

In 2020, Holdren and Gambold bicycled from Virginia to Oregon, documenting the progress on the blog "Casing the Promised Land."
