= Amy Williams (composer) =

American composer and pianist (b. 1969)

Amy Williams (born 1969) is an American composer and pianist. She was born in Buffalo, New York, into a musical family, with her mother, a violist with the Buffalo Philharmonic Orchestra, and her father Jan Williams, percussionist and professor emeritus at the university at Buffalo.

One of Williams's most notable works is her ambitious Cineshape series of chamber pieces inspired by different films. This was presented in May 2016 with live performances by the JACK Quartet, flautist Lindsey Goodman and percussionist Scott Christian, with a new video component by Aaron Henderson.

== Education ==
Williams began playing piano at the age of four and took up the flute a few years later with Robert Dick. Throughout her childhood, she was exposed to the latest contemporary music performed at the Center for the Creative and Performing Arts, meeting composers who would later become great influences on her own works, including John Cage, Morton Feldman, Lukas Foss and Elliott Carter. She made the decision to devote her life to performing and composing contemporary music whilst studying at Bennington College and after a fellowship year in Denmark, she completed a master's degree in piano performance at the University at Buffalo with pianist-composer Yvar Mikhashoff. She also completed a Ph.D. in composition from the State University of New York, working primarily with David Felder, Charles Wuorinen and Nils Vigeland. She returned to Bennington in 1998 as a member of the music faculty and moved on to a faculty position at Northwestern University in 2000. Since 2005, she has been teaching composition and theory at the University of Pittsburgh, where she is a professor.

== The Bugallo-Williams Piano Duo ==
Williams formed the Bugallo-Williams Piano Duo with Helena Bugallo, while both were graduate students at the University at Buffalo. The Duo has been featured at important contemporary music festivals and series throughout Europe and the Americas, including the Ojai Festival, CAL Performances (California), Miller Theatre, Symphony Space, Le Poisson Rouge (New York), Musica Contemporanea Ciclos de Conciertos (Buenos Aires), Festival Attacca (Stuttgart), Palacio de Bellas Artes (Mexico City), Warsaw Autumn Festival, Cologne Triennale, and Wittener Täge für Neue Kammermusik. The duo's debut CD of Conlon Nancarrow’s complete music for solo piano and piano duet (Wergo, 2004) garnered much critical acclaim. Wergo released the duo's second CD (music of Stravinsky) in 2007 and their third (music of Morton Feldman and Edgard Varèse) in 2009. Their recording of the complete piano duets of György Kurtág was released in 2015 and the second volume of Stravinsky transcriptions is forthcoming in early 2018, also on Wergo.

== Awards ==
- 2002 Wayne Peterson Composition Prize (Sextet)
- Audio Inversions Composition Prize (Cineshape 1)
- Thayer Award for the Arts
- ASCAP Award for Young Composers (verre-glaz)
- 2017–2018 Fulbright Scholar at the University College Cork, Ireland
- The American-Scandinavian Foundation
- The Howard Foundation
- 2009 Fromm Music Foundation Commission

== Fellowships ==
- Fellowship from the American Academy of Arts and Letters (the 2016 Goddard Lieberson Fellowship)
- Fellowship from the American-Scandinavian Foundation
- Fellowship from the Howard Foundation
- Fellowship from the John S. Guggenheim Foundation
- 2009 Fromm Music Foundation

== Commissions ==
- “Richter Textures” for the JACK Quartet
- Works for the Stony Brook Chamber Players
- Works for Tim Brady’s international guitar quartet project
- “Microludes for György Kurtág” for the Bugallo-Williams Duo
- Koussevitsky Foundation commission for soprano Tony Arnold and the JACK Quartet

== Positions ==
- Assistant Director of June In Buffalo
- Director of New Music Northwestern
- Member of the Artistic board of the Pittsburgh-based concert series
- Member of the Artistic board of Music on the Edge
- Member of the Artistic board of the Yvar Mikhashoff Trust for New Music
- Artistic Director and Composer-in-Residence of the New Music On The Point festival in Vermont
- Residency at the Akademie Schloss Solitude (Germany)
- Residency at Bellagio Center (Italy).

== Selected works ==
- Abstracted Art I (2001, piano four-hands)
- Abstracted Art II (2002, piano four-hands)
- Astoria (2004, piano)
- Binary Stars (1996, two pianos)
- Brigid's Flame (2009 piano)
- Child's Play (2015, soprano saxophone and percussion)
- Cineshape I (2003, alto flute and percussion (bass drum, crotales))
- Cineshape II (2007, piano and string quartet)
- Cineshape III (2008, flute, cello and percussion)
- Cineshape IV (2015, piano)
- Cineshape V (2010, flute, piano, percussion and string quartet)
- Cineshape Interludes (2016, #1 piano, #2 violin and percussion, #3 alto flute, violin and viola, #4 string quartet)
- Crossings (2009, piano four-hands)
- Don't Tell Susan! (1993, double bass)
- Dream Landscape 2012, percussion quartet (two vibraphones, 2 glockenspiels, 8 triangles)
- Duo (2011, alto saxophone and piano)
- Falling (2012, piano)
- First Lines (2006, flute and piano)
- Flood Lines (2013, orchestra)
- Fünf Worte (2017, soprano voice and Indian harmonium)
- JB Montage (2003, brass ensemble also available for brass quintet)
- Ligamy (2015, flute, clarinet, violin and cello)
- Mise-en-Scène 2016, small wind ensemble (wind septet, saxophone quartet, brass quintet and percussion quartet)
- Mørkekammer (1993, piano solo, string orchestra, harp and percussion)
- Pulse Stream (2006, orchestra)
- Quodlibet (2016, flute, oboe, string trio and piano)
- Richter Textures (2011, string quartet in seven movements)
- Sala Luminosa (2004, piano solo and chamber orchestra)
- Sextet (2001, piccolo, bass clarinet, violin, cello, piano and percussion)
- Stop/Yield (2015, cello and piano)
- Study in Syntax 1: Embers (Beckett) (2017, viola and piano)
- Switch (2014, piano four-hands)
- Univocity (2009, saxophone quartet)
- verre-glaz (1999, large chamber ensemble)
- Wrest (2005, violin and piano)

== Selected recordings ==
- Abstracted Art I: performed by the Bugallo-Williams Piano Duo
- Astoria: performed by Jeffrey Jacob
- Brigid's Flame
- Cineshape I: performed live by Due East
- Cineshape II: performed Amy Williams and JACK Quartet
- Cineshape IV
- Crossings
- Dream Landscape: performed by Fredonia Percussion Ensembles
- Duo: movement II performed by Matthew Younglove and Stephanie Titus
- Falling: performed by Amy Williams
- First Lines: performed by Andrea Ceccomori and Elitza Harbova
- Flood Lines: excerpt performed live by the Pittsburgh Symphony Orchestra, conducted by Manfred Honeck
- Ligamy: performed by the Pittsburgh New Music Ensemble
- Richter Textures: performed by the JACK Quartet
- Univocity: performed by the H2 Quartet

== Labels ==
Williams's compositions appear on the following labels:

- Parma
- VDM (Italy)
- Blue Griffin
- New Ariel
- Albany Records
