= Jenny Q. Chai =

Chinese pianist

Jenny Q Chai
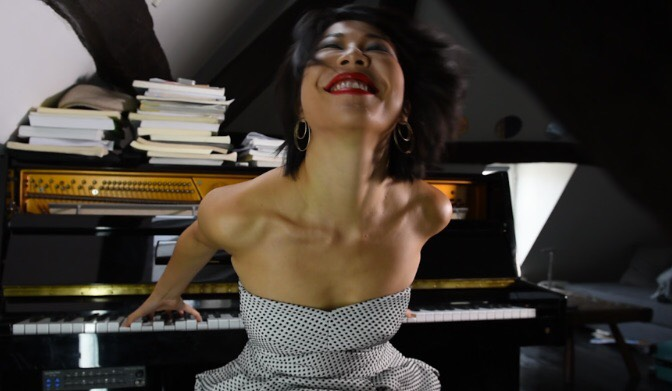

Background information
- Born: Shanghai, China
- Genres: Classical
- Occupations: Pianist, educator
- Instrument: Piano
- Years active: fl. ca. 2010–present
- Labels: Naxos Records, ArpaViva Recordings, MSR Classics Deutschlandfunk
- Website: jennychai.com

Jenny Q Chai is a Chinese-American pianist. She is active throughout China, the United States, and Europe, and specializes in contemporary piano music. She is a graduate of the Curtis Institute of Music and the Manhattan School of Music where she earned her Doctor of Musical Arts degree.

Her immersive approach to music is also channeled into her work with FaceArt Institute of Music, the Shanghai-based organization she founded and runs, offering music education and an international exchange of music and musicians in China and beyond.

== Career ==
In August 2010, she released her debut recording New York Love Songs, which features interpretations of works by John Cage and Charles Ives, among others.

In April 2012 she made her Carnegie Hall debut, prompting The New York Times's Anthony Tommasini review in which he noted her 'resourceful technique and sensitivity.' She has also performed at (Le) Poisson Rouge, which according to Vivien Schweitzer, was 'an eclectic program that used unconventional tools' .

In September 2013, she performed a lecture and recital at the Shanghai Symphony Hall. Exactly one year later, Chai performed to a full audience at Spectrum NYC, debuting selections from her next recording, Life Sketches: Piano Music of Nils Vigeland. The performance also included the American debut of Marco Stroppa's "Birichino", and an experimental rendition of Jarosław Kapuściński's piece "Juicy" using Antescofo, featuring animations of fruits. That year, Chai also recorded Five Easy Pieces by Michael Waller.

In October 2014, Chai was a featured performer at the Leo Brouwer Festival in Havana, Cuba, alongside Yo-Yo Ma, Jordi Savall and Bobby McFerrin.

In January 2015, Chai's doctoral dissertation on Marco Stroppa's Miniature Estrose (978-3-659-64847-2) was published.

On September 19, 2015, with fellow pianist Adam Kośmieja, Chai performed Phillippe Manure's "Zone de Turbulence" at the Warsaw Autumn International Festival of Contemporary Music. The double piano concerto was conducted by Alexander Liebreich, and supported by the Narodowa Orkiestra Symfoniczna Polskiego Radia (National Radio Symphony Orchestra).

Chai returned to (Le) Poisson Rouge on January 11, 2016 to perform works by Schumann, Stroppa, and Kapuściński, including "Where's Chopin?". The performance saw her integrate her playing with more Antescofo projections.

Chai has recorded for labels such as Deutschlandfunk, Naxos, ArpaViva and MSR. She can also be heard on Andy Akiho's The War Below, Michael Vincent Waller's Five Easy Pieces and Cindy Cox's Hierosgamos. Her latest solo CD (S)yn(e)sth(e)t(e) features works by Andy Akiho, Claude Debussy, György Kurtág, György Ligeti, Olivier Messiaen, and Scott Wollschleger and was released by MSR Classics in 2018.

In 2017, Chai performed Jaroslaw Kapuściński's Side Effects at Shanghai Benz-Mercedes Arena. The piece is also part of her 2018 program Sonorous Brushes, which received its London premiere at Chai's Wigmore Hall debut in summer 2017. Sonorous Brushes was repeated to great acclaim at New York City's Spectrum, when the New Yorker described her as “pianist whose dazzling facility is matched by her deep musicality.”

== Antescofo ==
Chai has been a vital champion of the experimental, score following Antescofo program, developed by colleague and composer Marco Stroppa, and scientist Arshia Cont. In September 2014, she completed a residency at IRCAM as a tester during update development alongside Jarosław Kapuściński. The artificial intelligence software has largely informed her presentation style, adding a visual and storytelling component to her performances. Following her residency, she became the first pianist to tour alone with Antescofo, displaying its capabilities internationally at the Shanghai Conservatory of Music, Spectrum NYC, (Le) Poisson Rouge, and Gran Teatro de La Habana. Chai has stated a desire to continue using Antescofo, so as to explore the relationship between the piano and electronics, as well as redefine public perception of classical music.

== Education ==
Chai began her music education at the Shanghai Conservatory of Music. Chai recently received her Doctor of Musical Arts degree at Manhattan School of Music, where she wrote her thesis (advisor, Marilyn Nonken) on composer Marco Stroppa. Chai has also studied at the Curtis Institute of Music with Seymour Lipkin, and has received two degrees from the Manhattan School of Music where she studied with Solomon Mikowsky, Anthony de Mare, and future collaborator and mentor, Nils Vigeland. One of the pieces she selected for her final recital at Curtis, Henry Cowell's "The Banshee", required her to play the piano solely on its strings, prompting at least one member of the audience to think she was the piano tuner.

In Germany, she studied with Pierre-Laurent Aimard, and performed in Ensemble 20/21, directed by David Smeyers, as well as the group Musikfabrik.
