= Chris Morgan =

Chris Morgan may refer to:

- Chris Morgan (American football), American football player and coach
- Chris Morgan (ecologist) British-born ecologist, conservationist, and TV host
- Chris Morgan (footballer) (born 1977), English football player
- Chris Morgan (journalist) (1952–2008), journalist working for The Sunday Times (UK)
- Chris Morgan (politician), British politician
- Chris Morgan (powerlifter) (born 1973), powerlifting champion
- Chris Morgan (filmmaker), film screenwriter and comic writer
- Chris Morgan, former guitarist for the blues rock band, Canned Heat
- Chris Morgan (rower) (born 1982), Australian Olympic rower in the Beijing 2008 Olympics
- Christopher Morgan (politician) (1808–1877), U.S. representative
- Christopher Morgan (bishop) (born 1947), current bishop of Colchester
- Christopher Morgan (Royal Navy officer) (born 1939)
- Christopher Anthony Morgan (died 1866), namesake of Fort Morgan, for which Morgan County, Colorado, was named
- Christopher Kaui Morgan, Native Hawaiian choreographer, performer, and curator
- Chris Morgan (1970–2010), alias of wrestler Chris Kanyon
