= Jan Williams =

American percussionist (born 1939)

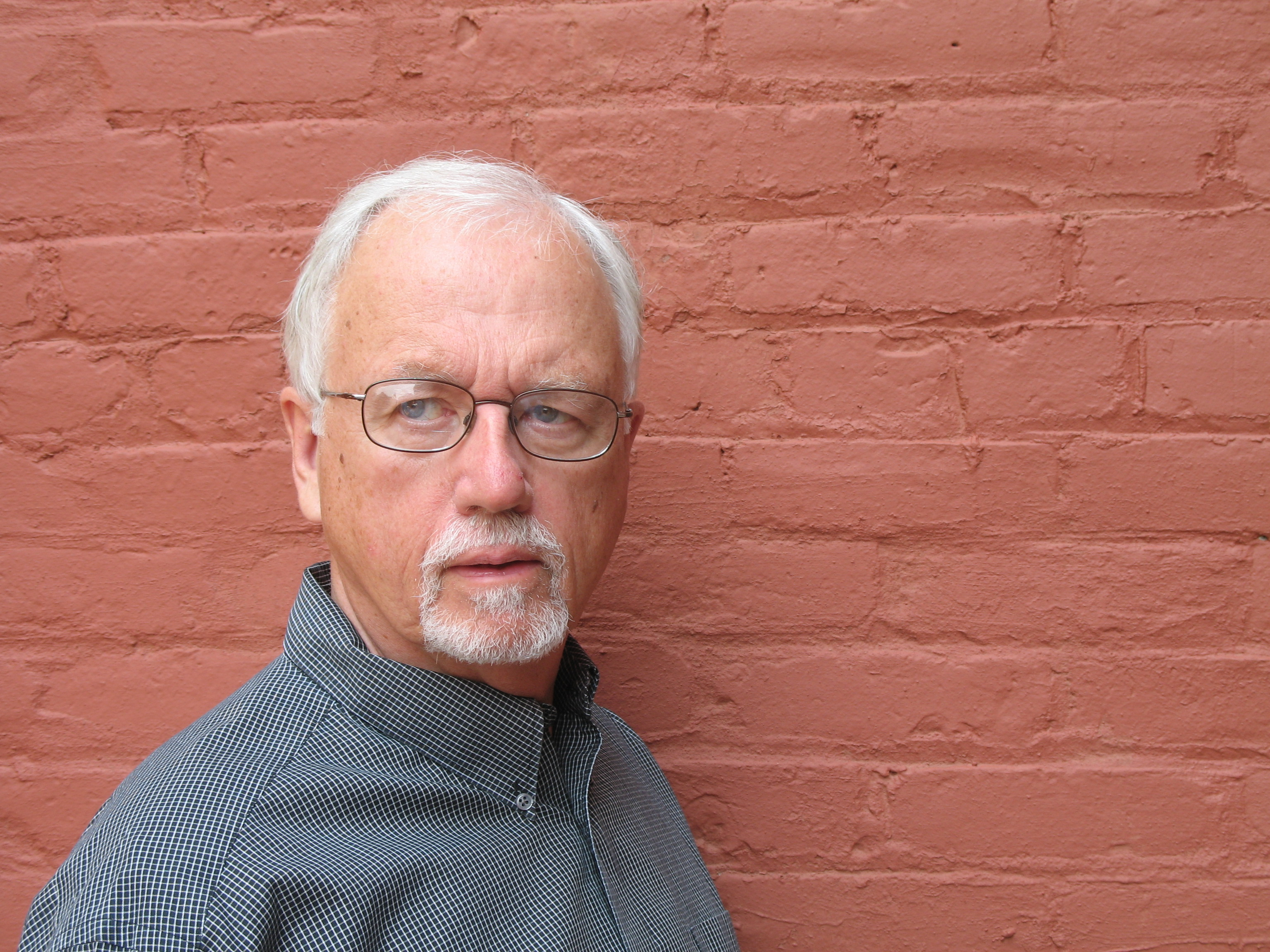
- Born: 17 July 1939 (age 87); Utica, New York
- Education: Manhattan School of Music
- Occupations: percussionist; arts administrator; teacher; conductor; composer

Jan Williams (born Jan Gardner Williams, July 17, 1939) is a percussionist, arts administrator, teacher, conductor, and composer who has championed avant-garde and progressive music in the United States. He is recognized as an important proponent of percussion performance and its literature.

== Biography ==
Williams was born in Utica, New York, where he first studied drums in elementary school under George Claesgens. After experience playing snare drum in marching and concert bands, he began to study timpani while in high school. At Clarkson University (Potsdam, New York), then called Clarkson College, he elected an Electrical Engineering major because his teachers discouraged music as a career. Within a year, he was out of school, and the following fall he entered the Eastman School of Music to study with William Street, who advised Williams to study the keyboard percussion instruments seriously. Sometime during that year at Eastman, Williams read a magazine article that praised the work of Paul Price, a percussion teacher at the Manhattan School of Music who was performing new music for percussion ensemble. In the Fall of 1959, Williams moved to New York City to study with Price at the Manhattan School of Music. He spent five years at the Manhattan School, earning a bachelor's degree (1963) and master's degree (1964) in music performance. From 1962 to 1964, he was a member of the American Symphony Orchestra under conductor Leopold Stokowski. In 1964, Williams was selected as one of the first Creative Associates at the Center of the Creative and Performing Arts at the University at Buffalo, which was founded by Lukas Foss and Music Department Chair, Allen Sapp. He remained at UB, where he created the Percussion Ensemble, with fellow Creative Associate percussionist, John Bergamo, continued an active performance career specializing in contemporary music and served as chair of the Music Department from 1981 to 1984. He retired in 1996 as Professor Emeritus. Williams also served as artistic director of the Center of the Creative and Performing Arts from 1974 to 1979 and as its resident conductor from 1976 to 1980. He co-directed, with Yvar Mikhashoff, the North American New Music Festival from 1983 to 1992.

Williams has been featured as solo percussionist with orchestras in Paris, Berlin, Tel Aviv, Copenhagen, Detroit, New York City, Buffalo and Los Angeles and appears internationally as percussionist, conductor, and instructor. Noted composers Lukas Foss, John Cage, Elliott Carter, Morton Feldman, Iannis Xenakis, Frederic Rzewski, Nils Vigeland, Joel Chadabe, Luis De Pablo, Gustavo Matamoros, and Orlando Garcia have written works for him. His playing and conducting have been captured on numerous commercial and archival recordings.

Williams was a member of the Percussion Jury for Germany's prestigious ARD International Music Competition in 1997, 2001 and 2014.

In 2014 the Burchfield Penney Art Center celebrated Williams' 75th birthday with a special tribute concert. Williams conducted colleagues and former students in a performance of Edgard Varèse's iconic percussion composition, Ionisation.

Jan Williams was interviewed in 2014 as part of the Burchfield Penney Art Center's Living Legacy Project.

As a fitting coda to his long career, on October 5, 2026 he conducted a performance of Morton Feldman's Rothko Chapel for a sold out house on the opening concert of the 87th season of the venerable Monday Evenings Concerts in Los Angeles, California.

Williams' wife Diane was a violist with the Buffalo Philharmonic Orchestra for 28 years. He has two daughters, Elizabeth Williams, a Nurse Practitioner and Amy Williams (composer), a composer and pianist. (Bugallo-Williams Piano Duo)

== Performance ==
Williams has appeared professionally as a percussionist and conductor in the United States and internationally.

=== As Percussionist (selected listing) ===
- Member of Creative Associates, Center of the Creative and Performing Arts, university at Buffalo, 1964–1980 with John Bergamo, George Crumb, and founder Lukas Foss, along with over 100 other "CAs"
- Member of the Feldman Soloists with pianist Nils Vigeland and flutist Eberhard Blum
- Premiered Morton Feldman's Why Patterns?, Crippled Symmetry, and For Philip Guston and performed them extensively with the Feldman Soloists in Europe, the Middle East and the United States
- Premiered Lukas Foss' Paradigm, Ni Bruit, Ni Vitesse, Concerto for Percussion and Large or Small Orchestra, Curriculum Vitae with Time Bomb, and MAP
- Premiered Elliott Carter's Adagio and Canto from Eight Pieces for Solo Timpani
- Performed internationally and recorded numerous works by Earle Brown, Morton Feldman, John Cage, and Christian Wolff (The New York School)

Williams has recorded for Columbia, Vox/Turnabout, Desto, Lovely Music, Spectrum, Wergo, DGG, Orion, Hat-Art, OO, New World, Deep Listening, EMF Media, Frozen Reeds and Mode Records.

=== As Conductor (selected listing) ===
- Resident Conductor, Center of the Creative and Performing Arts, 1976-1980
- UB Percussion Ensemble, 1964-1995
- Guest Conductor, numerous ensembles in USA, Europe, South America and Australia

The university at Buffalo Music Library has curated and archived 219 of his annotated scores (link below).

== Compositions ==
- Variations for Solo Kettledrums (1964)
- Dream Lesson, (1970)
- Deep Cello, (ca 1978, rev 2016)

== Teaching (selected listing) ==
- Professor, University at Buffalo, (1967-1996), where he founded and directed the percussion program
- Advisor, Bard Conservatory of Music Percussion Program
- Master Artist, New Music on the Point, Leicester, Vermont - 2017, 2018, 2019
- Numerous master classes, lectures, workshops and seminars at colleges, universities and music conservatories in USA, Europe, South America, New Zealand and Australia (partial list):

Hartt School
Manhattan School of Music
Bard Conservatory
University of California
University of Pittsburgh
Yale
Arron Copland School of Music, Queens College
University of North Texas
Ohio State University
Australian National Academy of Music, Melbourne
University of Western Australia, Perth
Victoria University of Wellington, New Zealand
Royal Danish Conservatory of Music, Copenhagen
University of Sao Paulo (UNESP), Sao Paulo, Brazil
National Conservatory of Music, Montevideo, Uruguay

== Publications ==
- Percussive Arts Society - "Percussive Notes" magazine

Interview with Morton Feldman, Vol. 21, September 1983
Iannis Xenakis, Persaphassa, An Introduction, Vol.25, March 1987
Collaboration II: A Conversation Between Joel Chadabe and Jan Williams, Vol.25, March 1987
Elliott Carter: Eight Pieces for Timpani: The 1966 Revisions, Vol. 38, December 2000
Interview of Jan Williams by John Hepfer, Vol 45, February 2007
Twelve-Tone Timpani: Variations for Solo Kettledrums (1964), Vol.46. August 2008
"All Angels Have Big Feet": Concerto for Percussion and Large or Small Orchestra by Lukas Foss, Vol.49, July 2011
Remembering John Cage, Vol 50, September 2012
Elliott Carter: Eight Pieces for Timpani, Vol 53, May 2015
Jan Williams: Pioneer and Visionary, by Michael Rosen, November 2018

- Interview of Jan Williams by Jeffrey Perry, Paula G. Manship Professor of Music Theory, Louisiana State University, for the Oral History of American Music at Yale University, 2022
- Interview of Jan Williams by Jeffrey Perry, Paula G. Manship Professor of Music Theory, Louisiana State University, Perspectives of New Music, Volume 62, Number 2, Summer 2024
- Discography (selected listing)

Morton Feldman, Feldman Plays Feldman, Mode Records CD 355 (2026), Morton Feldman, Eberhard Blum, Jan Williams
John Cage, Imaginary Landscapes, Hat Hut Records CD 6179 (1996), Maelstrom Percussion Ensemble, Jan William
John Cage, Ryoanji, Hat Art CD 153, (1995) Eberhard Blum, Robert Black, John Patrick Thomas, Gudrun Reschke, Iven Hausmann, Jan Williams
John Cage, Composed improvisation for Steinberger bass guitar and snare drum, OO Discs 14 (1994), Robert Black, bass guitar, Jan Williams, snare drum
John Cage, Europera 5, Mode Records 36 (1994), Martha Herr, soprano, Gary Burgess, tenor, Yvar Mikhashoff, piano, Jan Williams, Victrola, Don Metz, tape
Joel Chadabe, After Some Songs, Deep Listening DL 1 (1995), Jan Williams, percussion, Joel Chadabe, electronics, Bruno Speri, saxophone, Udo Weber, udo and djembi
Joel Chadabe, Follow Me Softly, The composer in the Computer Age VII, Centaur CRC 2310 (1997), Jan Williams Percussion, Joel Chadabe, Synclavier
Joel Chadabe, Many times Jan, EMF CD 050 (2004), Jan Williams, percussion
Joel Chadabe, Echoes, New American music: New York section: Composers in the 1970’s. Folkways FTS 33904 (1975), Jan Williams, percussion, Joel Chadabe, electronics
Joel Chadabe, Spring, Florida ElectroacousticMusic Festival v. 1, EMF CD 031 (2002), Jan Williams, percussion
Morton Feldman, Why Patterns?, Crippled Symmetry, Hat Art 2-6080 (1991), Eberhard Blum, flute, Nils Vigeland, piano/celesta, Jan Williams, glockenspiel/vibraphone
Morton Feldman, For Philip Guston, Hat Art 4-6104 (1992), Eberhard Blum, flute, Nils Vigeland, piano/celesta, Jan Williams, glockenspiel/vibraphone/marimba/chimes
Morton Feldman, Crippled Symmetry, Frozen Reeds frl/2, 2012, Eberhard Blum, flute, Nils Vigeland, piano/celesta, Jan Williams, glockenspiel/vibraphone
Morton Feldman, Instruments 1, Edition RZ 1010 (1994), Eberhard Blum, flute, Nora Post, oboe, Garrett List, trombone, Joseph Kubera, celesta, Jan Williams, percussion
Morton Feldman, Why Patterns?, CRI 620 (1992), Eberhard Blum, flute, Jan Williams, glockenspiel, Morton Feldman, piano
Lukas Foss, Music for Six, CRI SD 413 (1980), University at Buffalo Percussion Ensemble, Jan Williams, Director
Lukas Foss, Thirteen ways of looking at a blackbird, CRI SD 442 (1981), New World Records 80703-2 (2010), Rose Marie Freni, mezzo-soprano, Robert Dick, flute, Jan Williams, percussion, Yvar Mikhashoff piano
Lukas Foss, Echoi, Non-improvisation, reissue of Wergo 60 040 (1968) recording on EMF CD 005 (1998)
Lukas Foss, Paradigm, DGG LP 2561 042 (1970)
Lejaren Hiller, Algorithms DGG LP 2561 042 (1970)
Lukas Foss, Paradigm, Ni Bruit Ni Vitesse, Turnabout TV-S 34514 (1972)
New York School 2 (Brown, Cage, Feldman, Wolff) Hat Art 6146 (1994)
New York School 3 (Brown, Cage, Feldman, Wolf) Hat Art 6176 (1995)
Orlando Garcia, Metallic Images, OO Discs 6 (1991), Jan Williams percussion
Lou Harrison, Labrynth, Hat Hut Records, Hat Now Series ART 105 (2000), Maelstrom Percussion Ensemble, Jan Williams, conductor
William Ortiz, 124 East 107th Street, Opus One Records #99 (1984), University at Buffalo Percussion Ensemble, Jan Williams, Director
Roman-Haubenstock Ramati, Graphic Music, Hat Hut Records ART 101 (1997), Eberhard Blum, flute, Jan Williams, percussion, Iven Hausmann, trombone
Terry Riley, In C, Columbia (LP 1968 MK 7178)(CD 2009 Sony Classical 88697564942), Creative Associates (JW Marimba)
Leo Smit, Cock Robin, CRI 826 (ca1999), Jan Williams, percussion, Laurence Trott, piccolo, Rachel Lewis, soprano
Bernadette Speach, Without Borders, Mode Records 16, Jan Williams, percussion, Leonard Krech, trombone (Trajet)
James Tenney, Pika-don, Hat Hut Records, Hat Now Series 151 (2004), Maelstrom Percussion Ensemble, Jan Williams, conductor
Laurence Trott, For the Birds, Spectrum SR-131, Laurence Trott, piccolo, Jan Williams, percussion (Leo Smit's, In Woods and Lejaren Hiller's, An apotheosis of archaeopterix)
Jan Williams (composer/performer), Dream Lesson, Turnabout TV-S 34514 (1972)

== Administrator ==
- Member of Artistic Committee, Yvar Mikhashoff Trust for New Music, 1995-
- Artistic director, Center of the Creative and Performing Arts, 1974-1979
- Co-director, North American New Music Festival, 1983-1991
- Founder, New Percussion Quartet, 1966-1971
