= LGBTQ Sports Hall of Fame =

U.S. hall of fame to honor LGBT and allied personalities

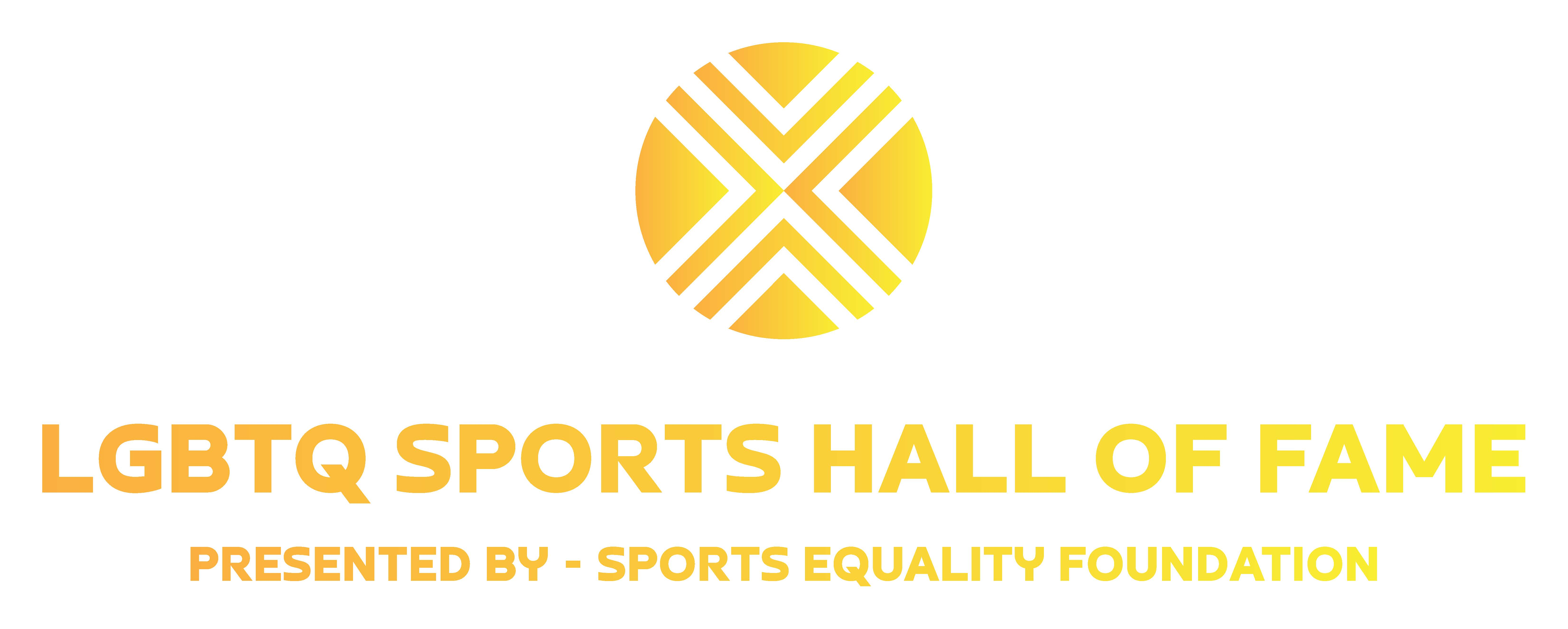
- Former name: National Gay and Lesbian Sports Hall of Fame
- Established: 2013
- Type: Sports
- Number of inductees: 64
- Founder: William Gubrud
- President: Robert Gorman
- Chairperson: Scott Bova
- Website: www.sportsequalityfoundation.org www.gayandlesbiansports.com www.sportsequalityfoundation.org/hall-of-fame

In 2013, the LGBTQ Sports Hall of Fame (formerly the National Gay and Lesbian Hall of Fame) was established to honor exceptional members of the LGBTQ community who have made significant and lasting contributions to the world of athletics and allied personalities, as well as organizations "whose achievements and efforts have enhanced sports and athletics for the gay and lesbian community". It was established shortly after Jason Collins became the first openly gay NBA player.

In 2025 it was announced that the Sports Equality Foundation has taken over responsibility for the renamed LGBTQ Sports Hall of Fame and will oversee its operations moving forward.

== Inductees ==
The 2013 induction class was announced on June 18, 2013, with a formal induction ceremony scheduled for August 2. Inductees were brought in in 2013, 2014, 2015, & 2025. The 2027 class will be announced in January 2027.

- Kye Allums, 2015
- John Amaechi, 2014
- Anheuser-Busch, 2013
- Brendon Ayanbadejo, 2013
- Schuyler Bailar, 2025
- Billy Bean, 2014
- Mark Bingham, 2014
- Sue Bird, 2025
- Maybelle Blair, 2026
- Erik Braverman, 2025
- Roger Brigham, 2015
- Glenn Burke, 2013
- Helen Carrol, 2025
- Ben Cohen, 2013
- Jason Collins, 2013
- Layshia Clarendon, 2025
- Orlando Cruz, 2013
- Chicago Cubs, 2013
- Tom Daley, 2014
- Wade Davis, 2014
- Gene Dermody, 2015
- Chuck Dima, 2013
- Justin Fashanu, 2013
- Federation of Gay Games, 2013
- Fallon Fox, 2014
- Andrew Goldstein, 2013
- LZ Granderson, 2013
- Pat Griffin, 2025
- Brittney Griner, 2014
- William "Bill" Gubrud, 2025
- International Gay Rodeo Association, 2013
- Nikki Hiltz, 2026
- Helen Hull Jacobs, 2015
- Christina Kahrl, 2013
- William (Bill) Kennedy, 2026
- Billie Jean King, 2013
- Chris Kluwe, 2013
- Phiadra Knight, 2026
- Dave Kopay, 2013
- Greg Louganis, 2013
- Chris Morgan, 2015
- George Moscone, 2014
- Chris Mosier, 2014
- Carl Nassib, 2025
- Martina Navratilova, 2013
- Anthony Nicodemo, 2026
- Nike, 2014
- Diana Nyad, 2014
- Ryan O'Callaghan, 2026
- Outsports.com, 2013
- Dave Pallone, 2013
- Violet Palmer, 2025
- Jerry Pritikin, 2013
- Sue Rankin, 2025
- Megan Rapinoe, 2015
- Renée Richards, 2013
- Robin Roberts, 2026
- Robbie Rogers, 2015
- Dale Scott, 2015
- Patty Sheehan, 2013
- Roy Simmons, 2015
- Jerry Smith, 2014
- Diana Taurasi, 2025
- Stand Up Foundation, 2014
- Gareth Thomas, 2014
- Esera Tuaolo, 2014
- Tom Waddell, 2013
- Kirk Walker, 2025
- Rick Welts, 2026
- Johnny Weir, 2013
- Sue Wicks, 2026
- Dan Woog, 2026

== Induction Gala ==
The LGBTQ Sports Hall of Fame holds an annual public Induction Gala honoring its inductees and providing a platform to recognize their achievements and amplify their voices. The gala is a key component of the organization’s mission to increase awareness of the participation and success of outstanding members of the LGBTQ sports community and to reinforce the message that sports are for everyone. The 2013, 2014, and 2015 galas were held at the Center on Halsted in Chicago. The 2025 Induction Gala was held at Park MGM in Las Vegas on August 10, 2025, followed by the 2026 gala at The Sony Theater on June 25, 2026. The 2027 Induction Gala is slated for June 26, 2027, returning to the birthplace of the Hall of Fame, the Center on Halsted. More details about the 2027 event will be posted on the organization's website.

== See also ==
- Homosexuality in sports
- List of LGBT sportspeople
- Principle 6 campaign
