= Lee Eun-young =

Lee Eun-young may refer to:

- Lee Eun-young (field hockey)
- Lee Eun-young (taekwondo)
- Lee Eun-young (footballer)
- Ben (South Korean singer) (Lee Eun-young), South Korean singer and songwriter
- Eun Young Lee, South Korean composer
