= Scott Wollschleger =

American composer based in New York City (born 1980)

- Born: May 21, 1980 (age 46); Erie, Pennsylvania
- Education: Manhattan School of Music, 2005
- Occupation: Composer
- Website: scottwollschleger.com

Scott Wollschleger (born 1980) is an American composer based in New York City.

== Biography ==
Wollschleger was born in Erie, Pennsylvania. He studied with Nils Vigeland at the Manhattan School of Music, earning a Masters of Music in 2005. He was a co-founder and co-Artistic Director of Red Light New Music, a new music ensemble based in New York, with Christopher Cerrone, Vincent Raikhel, and Liam Robertson.

His music has been recorded by pianist Ivan Ilić and released on Heresy Records, New Focus Recordings, and Cantaloupe Music. Wollschleger has been commissioned by and worked with the String Orchestra of Brooklyn, Longleash, loadbang, Mivos Quartet, and with soloists Leilehua Lanzilotti, Rachel Lee Priday, David Kaplan, Miranda Cuckson, Adam Tendler, and Karl Larson.

Wollschleger's music has been supported by grants and awards from the New York Foundation for the Arts, the Yvar Mikhashoff Trust for New Music, BMI, New Music USA, and the Society for New Music. Wollschleger is a 2027 Civitella Ranieri Fellow.

He is published by Project Schott New York.

== Music ==
Wollschleger calls much of his music "brontal", an idiosyncratic adjective invented by the composer to describe the paradoxes inherent in his work, which stems from his deep involvement with the works of philosopher Gilles Deleuze.

His music has been compared to that of Morton Feldman by Ethan Iverson, pianist of The Bad Plus, and has been described as "apocalyptic," "distinctive and magnetic," and possessing a "hushed, cryptic beauty" by Alex Ross.

== Selected Compositions ==
Works published by Project Schott New York include:

- America for cello (2013) (version for viola 2018)
- American Dream for piano, contrabass, and percussion (2017)
- Blue Inscription for piano (2010)
- Bring Something Incomprehensible into This World for piano and trumpet in C (2015)
- Brontal No. 3 for flute (piccolo), clarinet, horn, percussion (3 drums, water gongs, 2 cymbals, vibraphone, wood blocks), piano, violin, viola, cello (2012)
- Brontal No. 6 for piano (2013)
- Brontal No. 11 for piano (2020)
- Brontal Symmetry for violin, cello, and piano (2015)
- Dark Days for piano (2017)
- Gas Station Canon-Song for piano (2017/2018)
- The Heart is No Place for War for two vibraphones and two pianos (2016)
- I is Not Me for solo percussion (2013)
- In Search of Lost Color for piano (2010)
- Lost Anthems for viola and piano (2019)
- Lyric-Fragment for piano (2019)
- Meditation on Dust, concerto for piano and string orchestra (2015)
- Music without Metaphor for solo piano (2013)
- Outside Only Sound for string orchestra, percussion, and anyone (2020)
- Secret Machine No. 6 for solo piano (2012)
- Soft Aberration no. 2 for piano and viola (2015)
- String Quartet No. 2 "White Wall" for string quartet (2013)
- That Which Pushes Back is its Force for saxophone and piano (2016)
- Tiny Oblivion for piano (2016)
- Violain for violin and viola (2017)
- We Haven Taken and Eaten, a monodrama for solo percussionist (2015)
- We See Things That Are Not There for piano and vibraphone with crotale (2016)
- Without World for saxophone quartet (2016)

== Discography ==
=== Solo albums ===
- Lost Anthems (New Focus Recordings, 2025)
- Dark Days (New Focus Recordings, 2021)
- American Dream (Cantaloupe Music, 2019)
- Soft Aberration (New Focus Recordings, 2017)

=== Works Appear On ===
- Loadbang, Plays Well With Others (New Focus Recordings, 2021): CVS for baritone, trumpet, bass clarinet, trombone, piano and strings (2020)
- Loadbang, old fires catch buildings (New Focus Recordings, 2018): What is the Word for baritone, bass clarinet, trumpet and trombone (2014)
- String Orchestra of Brooklyn, enfolding (New Focus Recordings, 2022): Outside Only Sound for string orchestra and percussion (2020)
