= Gahlord Dewald =

Musician and Multidisciplinary Artist

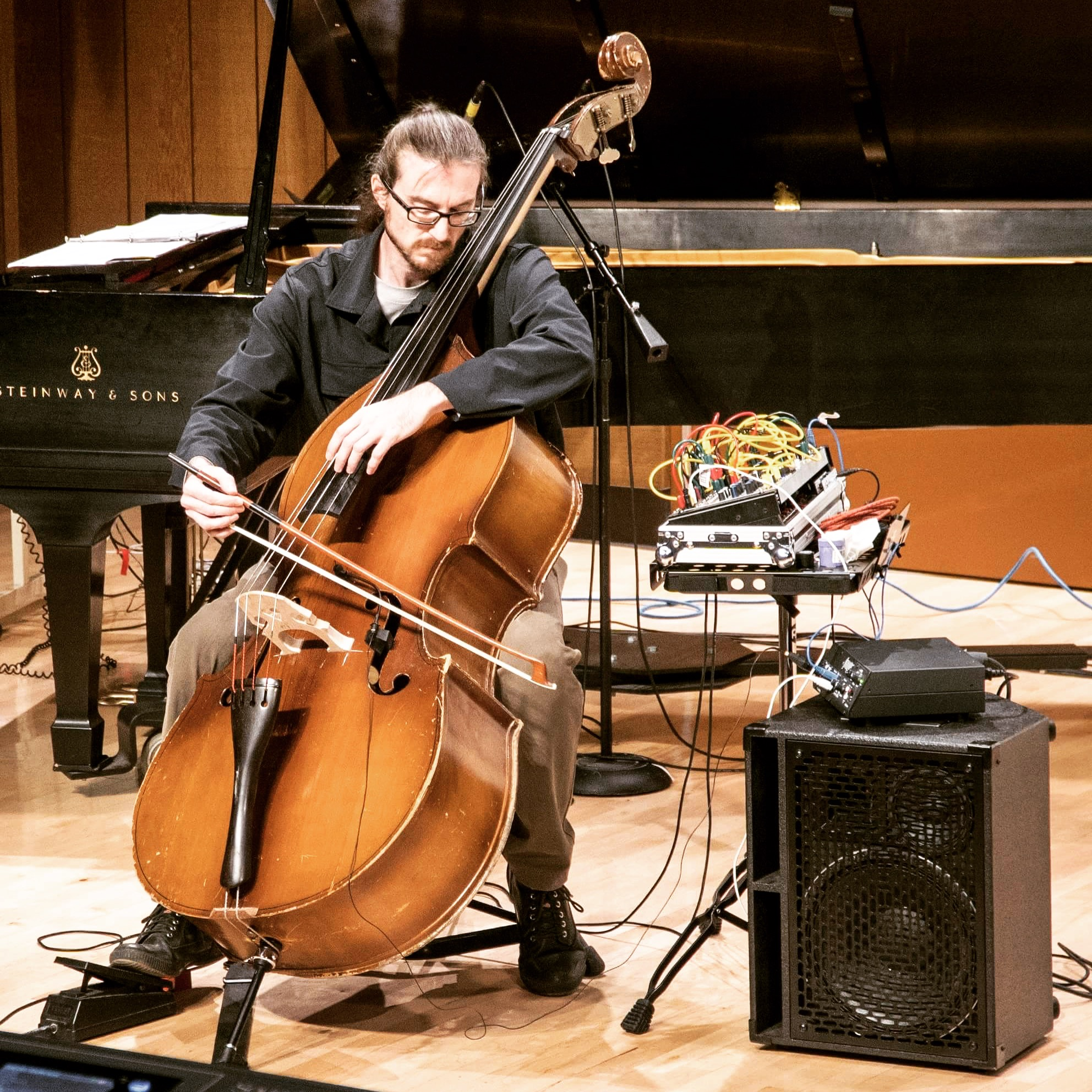
- Double bassist Gahlord Dewald performing with live modular synthesizer.
- Occupation: musician
- Website: https://gahlorddewald.com

Gahlord Dewald (born 1974) is a classically trained experimental musician and multidisciplinary artist. He is known as a bassist and electronic musician.

== Education ==
Dewald has a B.A. from Marlboro College. He studied with Salvatore Macchia and Mark Morton, and participated in workshops and masterclasses with Barre Philips.

== Professional life ==
A free jazz experimental musician, Dewald has performed as a soloist on the Hawai'i Classical Performance Series at Hawaiʻi Public Radio, at the Banff Centre for Arts and Creativity, and at New Music Gathering as a featured soloist.

Dewald performs with Toussaint St. Negritude in the duo Jaguar Stereo. Other frequent collaborators include Jessica Ackerley, rock band Charles, Dead or Alive? (named "7 Bands to Watch" in Seven Days VT), Greg Davis, Jabe Ledoux, Eric Segalstad in the band Fat Tiger, and Ariel Zevon.

As a composer, Dewald has written scores for films such as Hanging in There (2017).

As a cinematographer, Dewald did the cinematography for the sky in our hands, our hands in the sky (2023), a single-channel installation directed by Leilehua Lanzilotti. Dewald has also worked as an animator, with credits on projects such as 7 to 10 Days (2004) and on the Dog Sharks series.

Dewald founded the Community of Sound in Burlington, Vermont, a non-traditional performance spaces with resources for sound art and production facilities. He curated the AM Frequency Series and CoSine Series as an extension of that project.

Dewald has been guest music faculty of the Banff Centre for Arts & Creativity, University of Missouri, and Lehman College.

== Selected discography ==
=== Label recordings ===
- ʻālohilohi by Leilehua Lanzilotti on forever forward in search of the beautiful. New York, NY: New Focus Recordings, 2024.
- Jessica Ackerley/Kevin Cheli/Gahlord Dewald. Submerging Silently. Richmond, VA: Cacophonous Revival Recordings, 2023.
- String Orchestra of Brooklyn. enfolding by Leilehua Lanzilotti. New York, NY: New Focus Recordings, 2022.
- Dewald, Gahlord. Coherent Light Enclosed Without. Burlington, VT: Community of Sound, 2020.
- Dewald, Gahlord. Arousing // Fenestration. Burlington, VT: Community of Sound, 2018.

=== Compilations ===
- For Our Friends: A Disaster Relief Compilation, “Strategic Game 0014c,” Aloha Got Soul, 2025
- RE:Natura #02—Ratio, “Stellar Light Study #5,” RE:Natura, 2023
- “Persica” on Beats is Life, Sonic Planet Recordings, 2021
- “He’s using time in order to serve space, I’m using space in order to serve time” on It Sounds Like Vermont, Mount Pelier, VT: Histamine Tapes, 2018
- “Zealot” by Fat Tiger on Sound Friends Vol 1, Burlington, VT: Sticky Shed Tapes, 2018
