= Life Sketches: Piano Music of Nils Vigeland =

Studio album by Jenny Q Chai
- Released: September 2, 2014
- Recorded: 2013 in New York City
- Genre: Classical
- Length: 64:42
- Label: Naxos Records
- Producer: Jenny Q Chai; Nils Vigeland

Jenny Q Chai chronology
New York Love Songs (2010)	Life Sketches: Piano Music of Nils Vigeland (2014)

Life Sketches: Piano Music of Nils Vigeland is pianist Jenny Q Chai's second album, consisting of compositions by her mentor and collaborator Nils Vigeland. The track listing five works spanning forty years in their date of composition. It was released under the Naxos Records label on September 2, 2014.

Allora e ora is a suite of character pieces on various Italian subjects, and has an elaborate use of the sostenuto pedal.

Five Pieces is also a character suite, though the subject matter is abstract, and focuses on the textural aspects of the piano. Vigeland composed Five Pieces specifically for Chai.

== Track listing ==
All pieces composed by Nils Vigeland.

Alla e Ora (2013)
No.	Title	Length
1.	"Santa Fina (1238-1253)"	3:57
2.	"Accusi va er monno" (C.G. Belli-Roma, 14 November 1831)	2:22
3.	"Ricercare"	6:23
4.	"I Turisti"	2:47

Five Pieces (2010)
No.	Title	Length
5.	"1."	1:32
6.	"2."	2:09
7.	"3."	4:47
8.	"4.—"	4:23
9.	"5."	5:08

Life Sketches (1994) in memory of Yvar Mikhashoff
No.	Title	Length
10.	"Wild Hopes"	1:24
11.	"Profane Dance"	2:15
12.	"Trumpets"	2:02
13.	"Im Volkston"	2:08
14.	"Cambiata Waltz"	2:12
15.	"Barcarolle"	5:48

—
No.	Title	Length
16.	"L’empire des lumières" (hommage à René Magritte)	5:06
17.	"all in due time (1973)"	11:03
