= Five Easy Pieces (Waller) =

EP album by Michael Vincent Waller

Five Easy Pieces, is the first EP album release by composer Michael Vincent Waller. It features a collection of four pieces for piano solo L'anno del Serpente (2013), Ninna Nanna (2013), Per Terry e Morty (2012), Acqua Santa (2013) performed by Japanese pianist Gumi Shibata and Chinese-American pianist Jenny Q. Chai.
