= Mary Kouyoumdjian =

Armenian-American composer and documentarian

Mary Kouyoumdjian (born 1983) is an Armenian-American composer and documentarian based in Brooklyn, NY. She was a finalist for the Pulitzer Prize in Music in 2024 for her work Paper Pianos and was nominated for Best Opera Recording for her album Adoration at the 68th Annual Grammy Awards in 2026.

== Early life and education ==
Kouyoumdjian was born in the San Francisco Bay Area and grew up there. She is a first generation Armenian-American from a family directly affected by the Lebanese Civil War and Armenian Genocide. Kouyoumdjian studied at University of California, San Diego (B.A. in Music Composition); New York University with a focus on Scoring for Film & Multimedia (M.A.); and Columbia University (D.M.A. and M.A.). Primary teachers include Zosha Di Castri, Georg Friedrich Haas, Fred Lerdahl, George Lewis, Chaya Czernowin, Steven Kazuo Takasugi, Anthony Davis, Steven Schick, and Chinary Ung.

== Career ==
Kouyoumdjian has been commissioned by Bang on a Can, Carnegie Hall, the Kronos Quartet, the Metropolitan Museum of Art, New York Philharmonic, OPERA America, and many others. Her work has been recorded by artists such as The Merian Ensemble (members of the Atlanta Symphony), Kronos Quartet, and violist Noémie Chemali.

A co-founder of New Music Gathering, Kouyoumdjian also served as the founding Executive Director of contemporary music ensemble Hotel Elefant, and Co-Artistic Director of Wild Shore New Music.

Kouyoumdjian is Composition Faculty at The New School and the Peabody Institute at Johns Hopkins University. Kouyoumdjian has previously served on faculty at Boston Conservatory at Berklee, Brooklyn College's Feirstein School of Cinema, Columbia University, Mannes Prep, and the New York Philharmonic's Very Young Composers program.

Kouyoumdjian is published by PSNY (Project Schott New York).

== Concert music ==
- Paper Pianos was premiered by Alarm Will Sound at EMPAC in Troy, N.Y. on February 25, 2023. The work was recognized as a finalist for the Pulitzer Prize in Music in 2024. The Pulitzer committee described the work as, "a socially urgent multi-media work that boldly melds music and audio documentary with first-person stories of refugees, exploring how music serves as solace and inspiration under conditions of displacement."
- Kouyoumdjian's opera, Adoration, premiered with LA Opera in 2025.
- WITNESS, Kouyoumdjian's project with Kronos Quartet draws from stories of genocide, civil war, and loss. The project was developed over a decade of collaboration between the composer and quartet.

== Music for film ==
Kouyoumdjian has also worked as a composer, orchestrator, and music editor for film. Selected projects include:

- Writing an original score for An Act of Worship (Capital K Pictures and PBS’s POV Docs), which premiered at Tribeca Film Festival.
- Orchestrating the soundtrack to The Place Beyond the Pines (Focus Features).

== Discography ==
- Paper Pianos (Live) (2026)
- Adoration (Live) (2025)
- WITNESS (2025)
- 2 Suitcases (2024)
