= Sean Hickey =

American composer (born 1970)

Sean Hickey is an American composer and record label executive, born in 1970 in Detroit, Michigan, and based in Brooklyn, New York for decades. In 2022, after two decades at Naxos, he was appointed managing director of Pentatone.

== Career ==
From age 12 he took lessons in electric guitar. At Wayne State University, Hickey's composition teachers included James Hartway and James Lentini. He has been commissioned by a number of musicians and organizations including the Lincoln Center for the Performing Arts, the Saint Petersburg Symphony, Michala Petri, Avi Avital, Lara Downes, the Fine Arts Quartet, Philippe Quint, Matthew Cochran and the Whatcom Symphony Orchestra.

His first commercial recording, Left at the Fork in the Road, was released in November 2005 on Naxos American Classics. Featuring a selection of his chamber and orchestral works, the album broke the Billboard Top 100 Classical Chart and was praised as "substantive and savvy" by the magazine Gramophone.

In May 2013, an album of Hickey's clarinet and cello concertos was released on Delos. The album features cellist Dmitry Kouzov and clarinetist Alexander Fiterstein, along with the Saint Petersburg State Symphony Orchestra conducted by Vladimir Lande. The record was subsequently reviewed by NewMusicBox, which called the clarinet concerto "a formidable work".

Hickey's album Cursive was released in May 2014 on Delos, and is a retrospective of much of the composer's work for piano and chamber music combinations. Performing on the album are pianist Philip Edward Fisher, violinist Julia Sakharova, flutist Brandon Patrick George, violist Anne Lanzilotti, and harpist Meredith Clark. A further recording, by Greek guitarist Smaro Gregoriadou, was released on Delos in 2016, and features the second recording of his "Tango Grotesco", for solo guitar. Guitarist Matthew Cochran also recorded the extended solo work, Arroyo Seco.

2017 saw the release of A Pacifying Weapon, a concerto for recorder and orchestra commissioned by recorder virtuoso Michala Petri, and premiered by the Royal Danish Conservatory Orchestra led by Jean Thorel. The premiere and recording took place in September 2016 in Copenhagen, released in 2017 on Our Recordings, and again in 2019, also on Our, as "American Recorder Concertos". He has seen three other recordings of his works in 2019. 2024 has seen the recording of his most ambitious work inspired by the Yuval Noah Harari book of the same name: Sapiens: A Brief History of Humankind, for piano, released in 2025 on Sono Luminus. Two of Hickey's compositions are featured on Carolyn Enger's release, Resonating Earth, released in 2024 on Metier. The composer's work Fluid, features on the award-winning album from Lara Downes. His ground-breaking piano opus, Sapiens: A Brief History of Humankind, was released to critical and commercial acclaim in 2025.

Hickey is also a published poet and writer of music reviews and travelogues. He is an ASCAP member and is published by Cantabile Press. In addition, he was the Senior Vice-president, Sales and Business development, for Naxos of America, and speaks regularly at colleges, conservatories and universities throughout the world on his compositional and creative work, as well new media and musician entrepreneurship. In April 2022 Pentatone appointed Hickey as managing director.

== Recordings ==
- Neuma Records release – Mutually Assured Destruction (2025)
- Sapiens: A Brief History of Humankind (2025)
- Carolyn Enger – Resonating Earth (2024)
- Arroyo Seco – Matthew Cochran (2023)
- Lara Downes – Love at Last (2023)
- Bowed Colors II (2023)
- American Music for Violin and Horn (2020)
- Music from Five Centuries (2020)
- Trio Eclipse premiere recording of Tiergarten (2020)
- American Recorder Concertos (2019)
- Single Malt (2019)
- The Compassion Project (2018)
- A Pacifying Weapon (2017)
- Smaro Gregoriadou – El Aleph (2016)
- Cursive (2014)
- Concertos (2013)
- Dmitry Kouzov – The Art of the Cello (2009)
- Left at the Fork in the Road (2005)

== Works ==
=== Chamber ===
- Ampersand (2006) violin, piano
- Avatar (2005) violin, clarinet, piano
- Barri Gotic (2013) flute, guitar
- Concerto for Clarinet and String Quartet (2006) B-flat clarint, 2 violins, viola, cello
- Flute Sonata (1994) flute, piano
- Fool's Errand (2004) B-flat clarinet, piano
- Foolscap (2011) cello, piano
- Funny Papers (2003) accordion, piano
- Granfalloon (2004) bassoon, piano
- Grecian Bend (2014) 2 vlns, vla, vcl
- Horse's Mouth (2006) B-flat trumpet, horn, trombone
- Le Visage de Vence (2011) flute, piano
- Left at the Fork in the Road (2003) flute, B-flat clarinet, bassoon
- Longitude (2013) viola, piano
- Lunula (2016) flute, English horn
- Mala Strana (2017) violin, horn in F
- Mandolin Canons (2005) mandolin, guitar
- Mock Tudor (2016) recorder, guitar
- Pair of Pants (2003) flute, B-flat clarinet
- Paradise Out of Focus (1992) flute, oboe, B-flat clarinet, horn, bassoon
- Pied a Terre (2007) flute, viola, harp
- Portage of Paz (1997) viola, guitar
- Rumble Strip (2004) randomized ensemble
- Runes and Alphabets (1998) flute, B-flat trumpet, harp, marimba, xylophone, percussion
- Second String Quartet – Common Knowledge (2018) 2 violins, viola, cello
- Second String Trio (1996) violin, viola, cello
- Sonata for Viola and Piano – Jefferson Chalmers (2016) viola, piano
- String Quartet (1996) 2 violins, viola, cello
- String Trio (1994) violin, viola, cello
- Terroir (2014) 2 violins, viola, cello and piano
- Third String Quartet
- Tiergarten (2019) B-flat clarinet, violin, piano
- Unintended Consequences (2010) flute, violin, cello, piano
- Viola Sonata "Jefferson Chalmers" (2017) viola, piano
- Yurodivi (2012) B-flat clarinet, piano

=== Choral ===
- A Mind of Winter (2003) SATB chorus
- Agnus Dei (2007) flute, 2 ob, 2 bsns, 2 tpts, 2 trb, SATB chorus, cello, bass
- Magnificat (1993) SATB chorus, organ
- One Song, America, Before I Go (2017) SATB a cappella chorus

=== Orchestral ===
- A Pacifying Weapon – Concerto for Recorder and Orchestra (2016)
- Atahualpa (2015)
- Concerto for Cello and Orchestra (2008) solo cello, orchestra
- Concerto for Clarinet and Orchestra (2006) clarinet, string orchestra (string quintet in chamber version)
- Dalliance (2003) 2fl, 2 ob, 2 Bb cl, 2 bsn, 3 hn, 2 Bb tr, 2 trb, tuba, timp., triangle, b.d, cymbals, tamb, harp, str.
- Hitherto (2015) full orchestra
- Mandolin Concerto (2010) solo mandolin, 10 winds, percussion, double bass
- Sagesse (2003) fl, ob, 2 Bb cl, bsn, 2 hn, perc Str, ms, tenor
- Sinfonietta (2010) flute, oboe, B-flat clarinet, bassoon, horn, 2 violins, viola, cello, bass
- Single Malt (2015) vlns I, vlns II, vlas, vcls, db.
- Symphony ("Olympus Mons") (2012) large orchestra
- Symphony for Strings (1995) string orchestra

=== Solo ===
- Archipelago (2002) piano
- B-flat (2011) B-flat clarinet
- Beara (2001) violoncello
- Cursive (2011) piano
- Dance Apotheosis (2017) violin
- Dolmen (1999) piano
- Fallows (2012) piano
- Feeling Gravity's Pull (2010) oboe
- Fluff (2004) flute
- Hill Music: A Breton Ramble (2002) piano
- I'm About to do to You (What's Been Done to Me) (2013) Piano
- In Memoriam Kurt Vonnegut (2007) piano
- Insufficient Means (2019) oboe
- Ipso Facto (2019) piano
- Let the Sea Make a Noise (2018) cello, or any solo instrument
- Night Café (1993) piano
- Ostinato Grosso (2002) piano
- Portage II (2000) B-flat clarinet
- Portage III – Sarabande for Piano (2000) piano
- Portage IV (2000) clarinet in A
- Reckoning (2011) piano
- Saying Makes It So (2016) piano
- Scree (2000) piano
- Song (1992) piano
- Suite After Milhaud (1994) piano
- Tango Grotesco (2001) guitar
- The Birds of Barclay Street (2001) piano
- Two Epigrams (1995) bassoon
- Under the Trees The River Laughing (1991) piano
- What the Fisherwoman Saw (2004) piano

=== Voice ===
- Nocturne (2001) mezzo-soprano, piano
- To the Wars (2004) soprano, clarinet, cello
