= Jordan Bak =

Jamaican-American violist

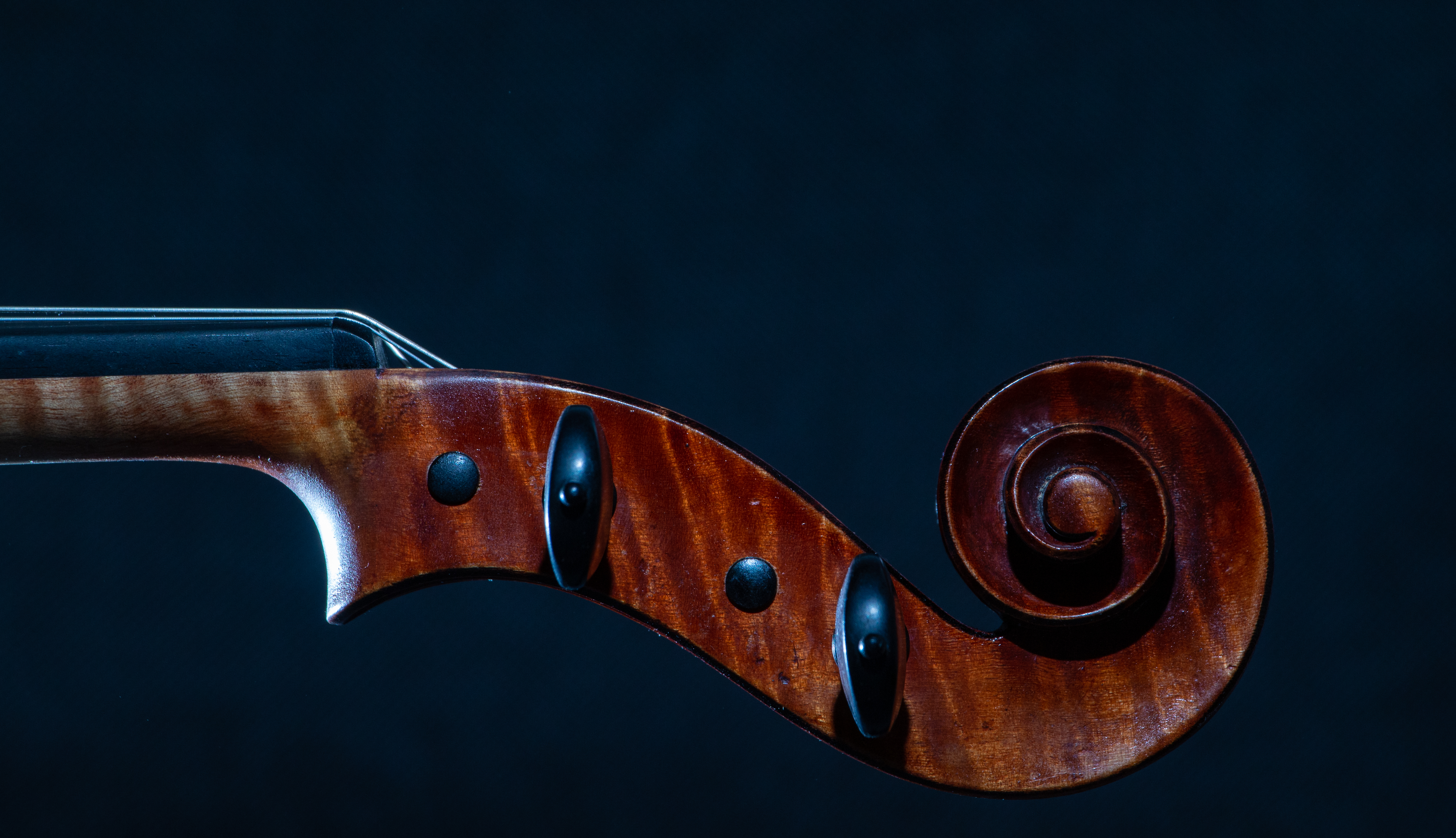
Bak's instrument of choice: viola.

Jordan Bak is a Jamaican-American violist.

== Early life and education ==
Bak graduated from the Juilliard School and the New England Conservatory. While at New England Conservatory, Hsin-Yun Huang, Dimitri Murrath, and Samuel Rhodes were his professors.

== Career ==
In 2019, Bak won the Concert Artists Guild Victor Elmaleh Competition, and in 2021, he was named a YCAT Robey Artist. Other achievements include receiving a Kovner Fellowship and the Sphinx MPower Grant. He has performed at London's Wigmore Hall, New York's Merkin Concert Hall, Bruno Walter Auditorium, Alice Tully Hall, Boston's Jordan Hall, and Baltimore's Shriver Hall.

In May 2022, Bak released his debut album titled IMPULSE (Bright Shiny Things). The album features compositions by Tyson Gholston Davis, Toshio Hosokawa, Leilehua Lanzilotti, Quinn Mason, Jeffrey Mumford, and Joan Tower. With the exception of one work by Rebecca Clarke, each composition was written in the last four decades. Pianist Ji Yung Lee appears on the Impulse album, joining Bak on Clarke's Untitled and on Toshio Hosokawa's arrangement of Takemitsu's A String Around Autumn. The album reflects Bak's creative interest in the physical properties of sound.

Bak held a faculty position as the Professor of Viola at Bowling Green State University, served as a Visiting Artist and Ambassador for Music Masters in London, and gave masterclasses at Oberlin Conservatory, Peabody Institute of the Johns Hopkins University, University of Wisconsin-Madison, Royal Birmingham Conservatoire (UK), Conservatorio del Tolima (Colombia), and the Brevard Music Center. He held a faculty position with the Opportunity Music Project in New York.

Composers Eli Greenhoe, Sampo Kansurinen, Caroline Shaw, and Delong Wang have collaborated with Bak. Another collaboration includes Bak playing with the Takács Quartet. The New York Classical Review wrote that "Bak's playing was so constantly involving and impressive that one was drawn to each note and phrase." Other collaborations include chamber music tours with Musicians from Marlboro and the CAG on Tour and being a guest artist with the Jupiter Symphony Chamber Players.

Playing viola and mezzo-soprano, Bak appeared in the world premieres of Kaija Saariaho’s Du gick, flög and in the world premiere of Die Aussicht for string quartet and soprano. He also performed with The Juliard Orchestra in Druckman Viola Concerto at Alice Tully Hall in New York.

Composer James Ra wrote a Concerto for Three Violas and Strings that featured three soloists: Jordan Bak, Ramón Carrero-Martinez, and En-Chi Cheng. They brought varied timbres to their respective roles which often divided into three primary ranges of high and lofty, warm and tenor-like, and supportive depth and across a textural spectrum. In the second movement, the concertizers traded solos as an alternate approach to three solo violists. Jordan Bak led the consort. Bak and music director Dong-min Kim led the movement's finale.

== Awards ==
In 2019, Jordan Bak received the Samuel Sanders Tel Aviv Museum Prize. In the same year, he received the John White Special Prize from the Tertis International Viola Competition.
