= New Music Gathering =

American yearly contemporary music conference/festival

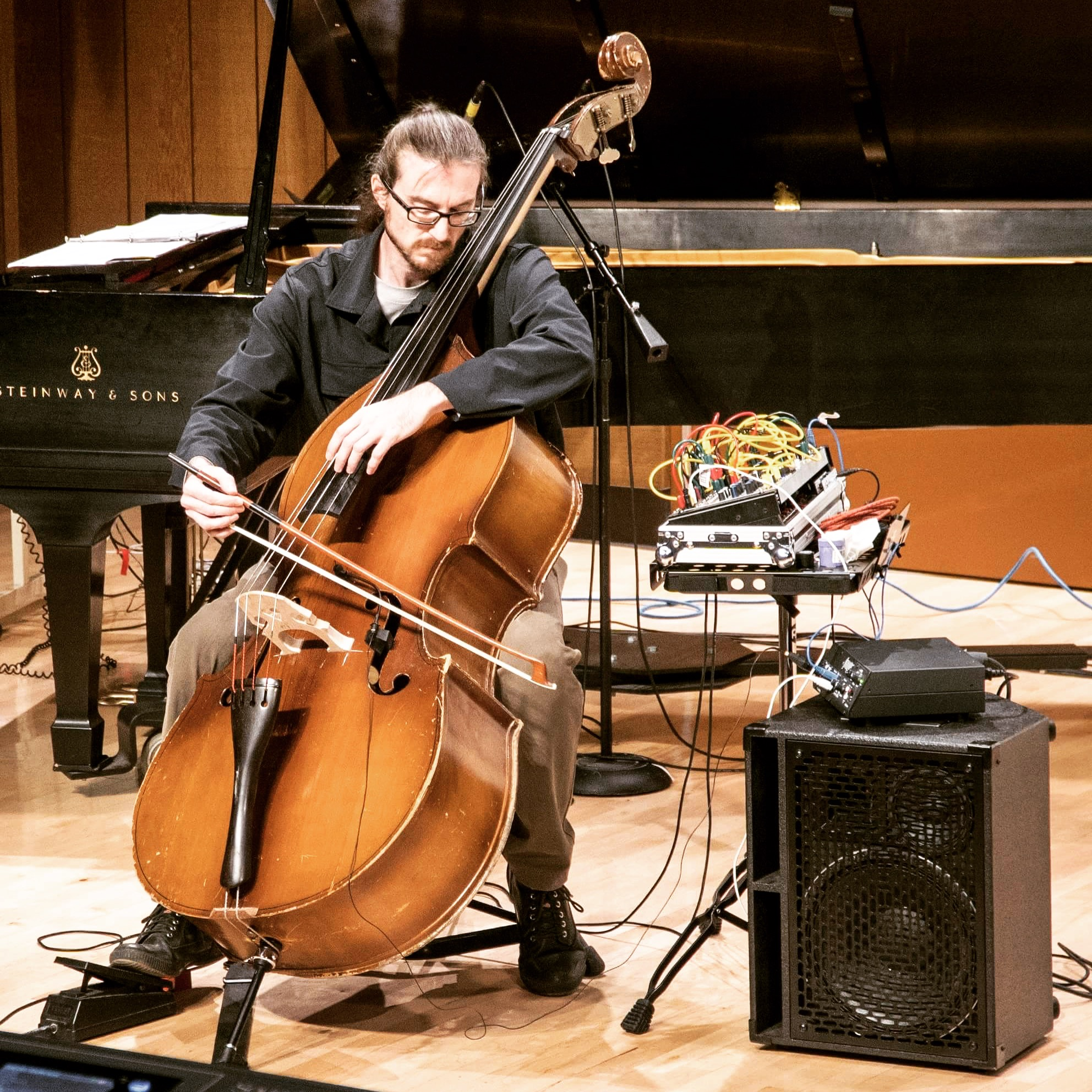
Experimental double-bassist Gahlord Dewald performing with modular synthesizer, NMG 2017

New Music Gathering (NMG) is a yearly American conference/festival hybrid devoted to the performance, development, and promotion of new and contemporary classical music.

The festival, established in 2015 and conducted in a different city each year, includes performances, lectures/recitals, discussion groups, presentations, and coordinated social interaction, including artist meet-ups and live-action role-playing games.

== Festivals ==
Year	Location	Keynote speaker	Headline performers	Theme
2015	San Francisco Conservatory of Music	Claire Chase	Claire Chase, Kronos Quartet, Wu Man, Sarah Cahill, The Living Earth Show	"Artist Led Ensembles"
2016	Peabody Institute of Johns Hopkins University	Marin Alsop	Sō Percussion, Kathleen Supové, Lunar Ensemble, Sonar New Music Ensemble	"Communities"
2017	Bowling Green State University	Steven Schick	Steven Schick, International Contemporary Ensemble, Grand Valley State University New Music Ensemble	"Support"
2018	Boston Conservatory at Berklee	Helga Davis	JACK Quartet, Pamela Z, Dinosaur Annex Music Ensemble	"Accessibility"
2020	Portland State University, Third Angle New Music, Fear No Music (fully online event)	Nathalie Joachim	Seth Parker Woods, Third Coast Percussion, Flutronix	"Local Action"
2021	Landmark Center (St. Paul)	Garrett McQueen	Queen Drea	
