= Alphabet of the Imagination =

1974 Essay collection by Harold Clarke Goddard

Alphabet of the Imagination: Literary Essays of Harold Clarke Goddard
- Editor: Eleanor Goddard Worthen; Margaret Goddard Holt
- Author: Harold Clarke Goddard
- Language: English
- Publisher: Humanities Press
- Publication date: 1974
- ISBN: 978-0-391-00250-0

Alphabet of the Imagination: Literary Essays of Harold Clarke Goddard, (1974) is a collection of essays and other writings by Harold Clarke Goddard. The writings were collected and edited by his daughters, Eleanor Goddard Worthen and Margaret Goddard Holt.

== Essays ==
I THE INNER LIGHT

Atomic Peace: the Chain Reaction of Good
The Witch Door
How Bright is the Inner Light?
Grace Before Peace: Voices of the Big Four, 1945
The Barren Fig Tree

II THE LITERARY VISION

Shakespeare
i. Hamlet to Ophelia
ii. In Ophelia's Closet
iii. Othello and the Race Problem
Blake's Fourfold Vision
William James's A Pluralistic Universe
Henry James's “The Turn of the Screw” with a Prefatory Note [1957] by Leon Edel
W.H. Hudson: Bird-Man
A Forward [1972] by Nevill Coghill: “Harold Goddard and John Livingston Lowes”
Chaucer's Legend of Good Women
An Introduction to Emerson
A Key to Walt Whitman
The Art of Chekhov, with Special Reference to “The Steppe”
Russian Literature and the American Student

The Feather in the Book (quatrain)
