= Jarosław Kapuściński =

Polish composer and pianist (born 1964)

Jarosław Kapuściński (Polish: [jaˈrɔswaf kapuɕˈtɕij̃skʲi]; born December 12, 1964, in Warsaw, Poland) is a composer and pianist specializing in intermedia. He is associate professor of composition at Stanford University, regularly teaching at the Center for Computer Research in Music and Acoustics (CCRMA). In 2016-2022, Jarosław Kapuściński was the Chair of the Department of Music at Stanford.

Kapuściński trained as a classical pianist and composer at the Chopin Academy of Music in Warsaw (now the Fryderyk Chopin University of Music) and first engaged in video art and animation during a residency at the Banff Centre in Canada (1988–89). He developed that area of work during doctoral studies at the University of California, San Diego (1992-1997) and as a postdoctoral student at McGill University in Montreal (2001).

In addition to his work at Stanford, Kapuściński has taught at McGill University (2001) and the University of the Pacific (United States) (2004-2008). He has lectured internationally on intermedia composition and performance, at IRCAM in Paris, the Centre for Interdisciplinary Research in Music Media and Technology at McGill University, at the University of Oxford, Tokyo University of the Arts, and at Columbia University, among others. He co-authored with Takanori Fujita and François Rose a website about Japanese Noh Theater as intermedia. With François Rose, he co-authored also a multi-lingual website about orchestration in the Japanese traditional court music, gagaku.

== Selected compositions and projects ==
=== Mondrian Variations ===
This piece, produced in 1992 at Institut national de l'audiovisuel (INA) in Paris and revised in 2011, is an audiovisual exploration of artwork by Piet Mondrian. The work has awards from the Locarno VideoArt Festival (1992), the Festival du Film d'Art de l'UNESCO, and most recently First Prize at the Fresh Minds Festival.

=== Where is Chopin? ===
This performance/installation, created in 2010 for the bicentennial of Chopin's birth, brings together video, and recomposed music based on Chopin's Preludes Op. 28. It explores the impact of Chopin's work in the minds and on the faces of listeners from around the world. To create the work, Kapuściński traveled internationally, interviewing and videotaping the participants. Where is Chopin? has been presented around the world. The installation version utilizes 3 screen video projection, stereo sound, and Disklavier piano.

=== Juicy ===
Composed in 2010 this work for piano and computer controlled image and sound was produced using stop motion animation of fruit. It has been performed internationally, including by Jenny Q. Chai at Spectrum in New York, CNMAT in Berkeley, the Festival Leo Brouwer de Música de Cámara in Havana, Cuba, at the China Shanghai International Arts Festival. Kapuściński has performed the work at over 25 venues including the Tokyo Experimental Festival, the Re-New Digital Arts Festival in Copenhagen, the Sonic Arts Research Centre (SARC) in Belfast, Run Run Shaw Creative Media Centre at City University of Hong Kong and EMPAC at the Rensselaer Polytechnic Institute. Juicy has been released as a DVD, along with Mondrian Variations, Catch the Tiger, Koan, and Oli's Dream.

=== Linked Verse ===
Written for cellist Maya Beiser, shō player Ko Ishikawa, 8 channel sound and stereoscopic projection, Linked Verse was produced in collaboration with The OpenEnded Group, and explores the connections and differences between Japanese and American cultures.
