= Mark Morton (double bassist) =

American musician and teacher (born 1962)

- Born: September 1, 1962 (age 64)

Academic background
- Education: Juilliard School (BM, MM, DM)

Academic work
- Discipline: Music
- Sub-discipline: Double bass performance
- Institutions: Texas Tech University; University of Hartford

Mark Morton (born September 1, 1962) is an American classical musician and academic working as Professor of Double Bass at Texas Tech University, Principal Double Bassist of the Lubbock Symphony Orchestra, Abilene Philharmonic Orchestra, and the West Texas Symphony, and the artistic director of the American School of Double Bass.

== Education ==
Morton earned an artist diploma, Bachelor of Music, Master of Music, and is the second double bassist to earn the Doctor of Musical Arts from the Juilliard School.

== Career ==
Morton was formerly a member of the Columbus Symphony Orchestra for 23 years. For 14 of those years, he was the principal double bassist. In 1990, he won first prize for the International Society of Bassists Solo Competition, and was the assistant to Gary Karr at the University of Hartford Hartt School.

As a recitalist and concerto performer, he has been a frequent performer on radio broadcasts including NPR's "Performance Today", WGBH in Boston, and WQZR in New York. He has also soloed internationally with groups such as the National Orchestra of Chile, the Houston Symphony, and the Symphony Orchestra Academy of the Pacific. He also has put out three albums titled Thresholds, Russian Rendezvous, and Bottesini's Greatest Hits (on which he plays both the double bass and piano parts). He also shares a CD with Gary Karr with music of Paul Ramsier. It was with that CD that Classical CD Reviews hailed him as "a most artistic representative of the new generation developed in the last half century."
