= JACK Quartet =

Contemporary classical string quartet

JACK Quartet is an American string quartet dedicated to the performance of contemporary classical music. It was founded in 2005 and is based in New York City. The four founding members are violinists Christopher Otto and Ari Streisfeld, violist John Pickford Richards, and cellist Kevin McFarland. In 2016, violinist Austin Wulliman and cellist Jay Campbell joined the quartet, replacing Streisfeld and McFarland. The quartet met while attending the Eastman School of Music, and they have studied closely with the Kronos Quartet, Arditti Quartet, and Muir String Quartet.

JACK has received strong critical reception for their performances of quartets by Iannis Xenakis, Georg Friedrich Haas, Helmut Lachenmann and Steve Reich, and has performed at venues around the world, including Carnegie Hall, New York's Lincoln Center, London's Wigmore Hall, and Amsterdam's Muziekgebouw. The group has also been heard at many contemporary music festivals, including the Donaueschingen Festival, the Lucerne Festival, the Bali Arts Festival, the Reykjavik Arts Festival, and the Venice Biennale.

JACK Quartet's radio credits include appearances on WNYC's New Sounds and Soundcheck, "The Music Show" from Australian National Broadcasting, and a full concert broadcast by NPR.

The group has initiated many educational residencies with composition students from a variety of institutions including New York University, Columbia University, The University of Iowa and Berklee College of Music.

Their album Lines Made By Walking was nominated for a Grammy Award for Best Chamber Music/Small Ensemble Performance at the 2022 Grammy Awards ceremony.

== Quartet members ==
- Christopher Otto, violin
- Austin Wulliman, violin
- John Pickford Richards, viola
- Jay Campbell, cello

== Recordings ==
rag'sma

- Released: 2021
- Format: LP + digital
- Label: greyfade
- Writer: Christopher Otto
- Tracks: rag'sma q1q2q3, rag'sma q1q2, rag'sma q1/q2

A Cockroach's Tarantella

- Released: 2020
- Format: Streaming
- Label: Modern Sky
- Writer: Du Yun
- Tracks: Epilogue, A Cockroach's Tarantella - English, Tattooed In Snow, A Cockroach's Tarantella - Chinese, Prologue. A Cockroach's Tarantella (with Du Yun, narrator)

Hidden

- Released: 2018
- Format: CD
- Label: WERGO
- Writer: Chaya Czernowin
- Tracks: Hidden

Laura Schwendinger: Quartets

- Released: 2018
- Format: CD
- Label: Albany Records
- Writer: Laura Schwendinger
- Tracks: Creature Quartet: Hymn for Lost Creatures (JACK Quartet), Sudden Light (Jamie Van Eyck, mezzo soprano; Christopher Otto, violin; Ari Streisfeld, violin; Kevin McFarland, cello), String Quartet in three movements (JACK Quartet), Song for Andrew (Christopher Otto, violin; John Richards, viola; Kevin McFarland, cello; Christopher Taylor, piano)

First Performance IV

- Released: 2014
- Format: CD
- Tracks: Robericus/Christopher Otto: Angelorum Psalat, Elliot Carter: String Quartet No. 3, Ruth Crawford Seeger: String Quartet, George Freiderich Haas: String Quartet No. 8

Cineshape & Duos

- Released: 2013
- Format: CD
- Label: Albany Records
- Writer: Amy Williams
- Tracks: First Lines (Lindsey Goodman, flute; Amy Williams, piano), Stop/Yield (Kevin McFarland, cello; Amy Williams, piano), Wrest (Ari Streisfeld, violin; Amy Williams, piano), Duo (Noah Getz, saxophone; Andrew Welch, piano), Cineshape 1 (Lindsey Goodman, flute; Scott Christian, percussion), Cineshape 3 (Lindsey Goodman, flute; Kevin McFarland, cello; Scott Christian, percussion), Cineshape 4 (Amy Williams, piano), Cineshape 5 (Lindsey Goodman, flute; JACK Quartet)

Crossings

- Released: 2013
- Format: CD
- Label: Albany Records
- Writer: Amy Williams
- Tracks: Richer Textures, Brigid's Flame, Falling, Astoria, Crossings, Abstracted Art, Cineshape 2

Threadsuns

- Released: 2011
- Format: CD
- Label: Tzadik Records
- Writer: Ha-Yang Kim
