= Dan Woog (writer) =

American writer and soccer coach

Dan Woog (March 27, 1953) is an American journalist, author, soccer coach, LGBT activist, and speaker. Since 2009, Woog has run "06880," a blog devoted to chronicling events in Woog's hometown of Westport, CT (its title refers to the Westport's ZIP Code). A gay man, Woog has spoken and written prolifically about LGBT issues, especially in the context of soccer and athletics more broadly. In 1997, Woog published Jocks: True Stories of America's Gay Male Athletes. A sequel, Jocks 2: Coming Out to Play, was published in 2002.

== Blogging and "06880" ==
Since starting "06880," Woog has posted stories to the blog at least once a day. The blog's website states its mission: "to create a community for Westporters old and new, near and far, through sharing stories, news, events, history and perspectives, uniting all who love our hometown."

"06880" topics include Westport politics, lifestyle, history, current issues, organizations, personalities, arts, sports, businesses, opinions, and trends. In addition to publishing written stories, Woog releases an "06880" podcast every other Monday. "06880" also hosts public events, including forums, workshops, and meetings, aimed at raising awareness around local issues.

"06880" is classified as a non-profit 501(c)(3) organization. It is overseen by a board of directors, including Miggs Burroughs (chair), John Dodig, Dan Donovan, Chloe Murray, Annette Norton, Amy Saperstein, and Bill Scheffler.

== Writing ==
Woog developed an interest in writing during childhood. As a junior at Staples High School, Woog inherited the "Up at Staples" column in the Westport News, the town's local newspaper. Woog's "Up at Staples" subjects included the Vietnam War, the Civil rights movement, and prominent musical acts who performed at Staples, including Cream, the Doors, the Animals, and Richie Havens.

As an undergraduate at Brown University, Woog wrote for the Brown Daily Herald.

After graduating from Brown in 1975, Woog continued writing freelance journalism. He contributed two articles to Sports Illustrated, including "A Sobering Thought for Athletes: By Their Teachers They'll Be Taught," protesting the requirement that school coaches hold teaching certifications.

Since 1986, Woog has written "Woog's World," a weekly column appearing in the Westport News every Friday. "Woog's World" columns have been collected in two books: Woog's World: The Book and Woog's World: The Sequel. He also wrote "The OutField," a column on LGBT sports distributed nationally by Q Syndicate.

Altogether, Woog has written 17 books. Frequent subjects include soccer, LGBT issues, and Westport. His most recent book is We Kick Balls: True Stories from the Youth Soccer Wars. It is a memoir of his four decades as a high school and youth soccer coach.

== Soccer coaching ==
Woog co-founded the Westport Soccer Association in 1975 and began coaching youth teams in the same year. Woog began coaching soccer at Long Lots Junior High (now Long Lots Elementary) in 1978. In 1983, when ninth grade became first year at Staples High School, he began coaching Staples High School's freshman boys soccer team. Between 1983 and 2002, he served as head coach for Staples's freshman and junior varsity teams, then assistant coach For Staples's varsity boys soccer team.

In 2003, head coach Jeff Lea retired, and Woog was promoted to head coach. Woog coached the varsity team through his retirement in January 2022.

Throughout his career, Woog accumulated numerous recognitions and awards, including:

- Connecticut Soccer Hall of Fame, 2000
- Connecticut High School Soccer Coach of the Year, 2011
- United Soccer Coaches' Letter of Commendation, 2022
- 4 Fairfield County Interscholastic Athletic Conference (FCIAC) championships
- 1 Connecticut state "LL" (extra large schools) championship

== LGBT activism ==
Woog has devoted much of his career to combating homophobia in sports, once telling the New York Times, "it's not so important who you love...but that you love."

In 2014, Woog cofounded the United Soccer Coaches's LGBTQ & Allies advocacy group. The group is devoted to educating people in the broader soccer community about the importance of including lesbian, gay, bisexual, transgender, queer, and questioning community, as well as encouraging members of that community to play soccer. The group created an online educational model for the 30,000 members of United Soccer Coaches, and introduced a "Play With Pride" rainbow laces initiative that takes place every September.

In 1993, he helped found Staples High School's Gay-Straight Alliance (since renamed Staples Pride, a branch of the Westport Public Schools Pride Coalition). The group website describes its mission as "creating a safe space for LGBTQ+ individuals and allies to organize, discuss, and promote equity and inclusion across the district, schools, and beyond."

Woog's book, School's Out: The Impact of Gay and Lesbian Issues on America's Schools was published in 1995. The New York Times described it as "the first comprehensive volume describing what he has found to be a deep-rooted homophobia prevalent in most American schools, and how that affects gay students and teachers."

Woog co-founded OutSpoken, a weekly support group in Norwalk, CT for gays and lesbians between 16 and 22 years old. He facilitated the program for more than 20 years, serving more than 2,000 young people throughout his tenure. In 2015, Woog received the Triangle Community Center's Visionary Award in honor of his work.

In 2026, Woog was inducted into the LGBTQ Sports Hall of Fame. The Sports Equality Foundation, which oversees the LGBTQ Sports Hall of Fame's operations, described Woog as a "longtime champion for LGBTQ inclusion in sports through coaching and storytelling."

== Bibliography ==
- Stephen Christopher Martin (1985)
- Woog's World: The Book (1991)
- Goals and Glory: Staples Soccer 1957–1995 (1995)
- School's Out: The Impact of Gay and Lesbian Issues on America's Schools (1995)
- Jocks: True Stories of America's Gay Male Athletes (1997)
- The Ultimate Soccer Almanac (1998)
- Woog's World: The Sequel (1998)
- The Parent's Guide to Soccer (1999)
- Friends & Family: True Stories of Gay America's Straight Allies (1999)
- People in the News – Jesse Jackson (1999)
- The Ultimate Soccer Encyclopedia (2000)
- 20 Steps to Better Soccer (2000)
- Dear Dan...: Apologies from an Imperfect World (2001)
- Gay Men, Straight Jobs (2001)
- Jocks 2: Coming Out to Play (2002)
- Staples High School: 120 Years of A+ Education (2005)
- We Kick Balls: True Stories from the Youth Soccer Wars (2012)
- Pick of the Pics (2022)
