= Michael Waller =

Michael Vincent Waller
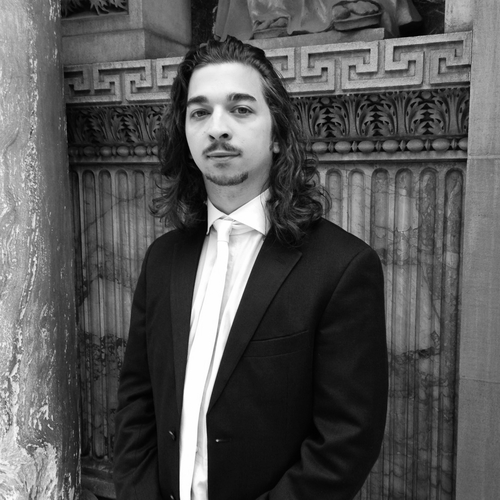

Background information
- Born: Michael Vincent Waller; October 26, 1985 (age 40)
- Origin: Staten Island, New York
- Genres: 21st-century classical, minimalist, contemporary classical
- Occupation: Composer
- Years active: 2008–present
- Labels: Unseen Worlds, Recital, XI Records, AWAL
- Website: michaelvincentwaller.com

Michael Vincent Waller (born October 26, 1985, in Staten Island, New York) is an American composer of contemporary classical music. He has studied with La Monte Young, Marian Zazeela, and Bunita Marcus.

== Life and works ==
His recent compositions have been compared to Erik Satie, Claude Debussy, Maurice Ravel, Keith Jarrett, and Morton Feldman blending elements of minimalism, impressionism, gamelan, world music, and melodic classicism. His piano works have been described as "evoking Debussy but refracted through a 21st century prism". Reviewer Brian Olewnick summarizes, "Waller's music has centered around a kind of melodic classicism, the source of which I struggle to ascertain." Critic Harry Rolnick in reviewing a performance of his String Trio Per La Madre e La Nonna (2012), "The harmonies were like something written by Dvorák (perhaps his Cypresses), but they were obvious original."

His chamber works feature a rich lyricism and counterpoint, described by Steve Smith of The New York Times as "sweetly lyrical". In the October 2014 issue of the Brooklyn Rail, George Grella highlighted Waller as an emerging, unique artist in New York who deserves more critical attention, and to be heard by larger audiences, "The fruits are heard on an EP released early this year, Five Easy Pieces, piano works played by Megumi Shibata and Jenny Q. Chai. The music is subtly affecting and shows his roots in Bartók and Debussy without ever casting a shadow over his own voice and vision."

Waller's early work was heavily focused on the avant-garde, with his use of microtonality, just intonation, new abstract forms, extensive glissandi, and isolated sonorities around frequent silences. During this period, he also composed electroacoustic music with monolithic drones and interference beats, and overall features appreciation for slow durations, exotic harmonic relationships, and process-based phenomenon.

His postminimal chamber works have been performed by members of the S.E.M. Ensemble and FLUX Quartet, performing at venues such as ISSUE Project Room and Carnegie Hall. He also curates an avant-garde program in New York City, the NewIdeas MusicSeries, with composers Phill Niblock, Elliott Sharp, a duo with David First, and many more performing. He was written up in TimeOut Classical, "Composer and visual artist Michael Vincent Waller, who also happens to be a protégé of La Monte Young and Marian Zazeela, opens the second season of the plugged-in new-music series".
