= The Meaning of Shakespeare =

1951 book by Harold Goddard

- Author: Harold Clarke Goddard
- Genre: Theatre
- Publication date: 1951
- ISBN: 978-0226300412

The Meaning of Shakespeare (1951) was written by Harold Clarke Goddard. A chapter is devoted to each of thirty-seven plays by William Shakespeare, ranging from three pages for The Comedy of Errors to over 50 for Henry V. Three additional chapters treat larger themes.

After the book was finished and had been accepted for publication, Dr. Goddard died without having named it; the title was provided by the publisher, the University of Chicago Press. Originally published as one volume, it was later split into two volumes.
