= Harold Clarke Goddard =

American professor

Harold Clarke Goddard (August 13, 1878 - February 27, 1950) was a professor in the English Department of Swarthmore College.

== Biography ==
Born on August 13, 1878, in Worcester, Massachusetts, he attended Amherst College, graduating in 1900. He then taught mathematics there for two years. An interest in literature led him to Columbia University, where he received a PhD in English and comparative literature in 1909. He taught at Northwestern University from 1904 to 1909. From 1909 to his retirement in 1946, he was head of the English Department at Swarthmore College. He died in 1950. Although often believed to be a Quaker, Goddard was never a full member.

He was married to Fanny Whiting Goddard (a native of Worcester as well), and they had two daughters, Eleanor Goddard Worthen and Margaret Goddard Holt. The entire family was involved in teaching:

Dr. Goddard's peculiar genius lay in the fact that, whatever the book he laid before us, it presently became apparent that we were in fact studying and expanding all our range of possible understanding. Through the medium of literature he taught philosophy, psychology, and always the pursuit of meaning and the zest for life that great art is. The whole Goddard family joined in this. It is correct to refer to a seminar with "the Goddards." The family had an exciting symphonic quality which brought alive the search for meaning and beauty which we were learning to impose upon ourselves. The same art spirit ran through Eleanor's music, Margaret's painting and Mrs. Goddard's blue delphinium.

Harold Bloom, a professor of humanities at Yale University, wrote this:

Harold Goddard's The Meaning of Shakespeare is a work fully in the tradition of Samuel Johnson, William Hazlitt, and A.C. Bradley. This superb commentary upon all of Shakespeare's plays has been an inspiration for me for half a century, and I never tire of recommending it passionately to my own students.

The Meaning of Shakespeare is the only book of Dr. Goddard's currently in print. Though it was originally published as a single hardback volume in 1951, The Meaning of Shakespeare is now published in two paperback volumes. Volume 1 contains this line which is characteristic of the book: "The greatest poetry has always depicted the world as a little citadel of nobility threatened by an immense barbarism, a flickering candle surrounded by infinite night."

== Bibliography ==
- Studies in New England Transcendentalism (1908). The Columbia University Press.
- The Sisters; A Play in One Act (1914).
- Morale (1918). George H. Doran Company.
- The Meaning of Shakespeare (1951). The University of Chicago Press.
- Alphabet of the Imagination: Literary Essays of Harold Clarke Goddard (1974). Humanities Press.
