= Chris Morgan (powerlifter) =

British powerlifter (born 1973)

Chris Morgan (born 16 March 1973) is a British powerlifter. He is a global ambassador to the Federation of Gay Games and a ten-time world champion in his sport.

== Career ==
=== WDFPF / BDFPA ===
Morgan competed in the 75 kg Open class from 1998 to 2006. He won the silver medal in the World Drug-Free Powerlifting Federation Finals in Atlanta in November 2004, the gold medal in December 2005 at the finals in Turin and the bronze medal in November 2006 at the finals in Ireland. Morgan is amongst the earliest openly gay male athletes to win world medals in sports globally and is the most successful openly gay strength athlete of all time.

Following a break from competing in 2007 due to illness, Morgan returned in the 82.5 kilo Open class, this time mainly competing in the World Drug-Free Powerlifting, single event championships. He has since won silver in Antwerp 2008 (Squat) (Senior), gold in Antwerp 2008 (Deadlift) (Senior), gold in Bradford 2009 (Deadlift) (Open), bronze in Milton Keynes 2009 (Powerlifting) (Open), gold in Moscow 2010 (Deadlift) (Open), gold in Autun 2012 (Deadlift) (Open), gold in Antwerp 2013 (Deadlift) (Open), gold in Antwerp 2013 (Deadlift) (Masters 1), silver in Dusseldord 2014 (Masters 1), and bronze in Düsseldorf 2014 (Open), Gold in Telford 2015 (Masters 1).

During his career he has won 18 British Championships. The first of these was in 2005, with an additional three in 2008, and then two in 2010, two in 2011, one in 2012, two in 2013, three in 2014, three in 2015 and 1 in 2016. In 2010, 2011, 2012, 2013, 2014 and 2015 he was overall Best Lifter at the British Deadlift Championships.

He is a three-time European Champion, winning gold medals in Estonia 2011 (Deadlift) (Open) and in Lausanne 2012 (Deadlift) (Open). In 2011 he won The International Best Lifter title for Deadlift at European Single Event Championships in Voka, Estonia.

Morgan currently holds multiple British and World records in Deadlift within the International All Round Weightlifters Association, which is a strength association for athletes competing in drug-free weightlifting, powerlifting, and Strongman.

Morgan qualified as an international referee in 2009 and has officiated at the WDFPF World Championships in Bradford 2009, Milton Keynes 2009, Moscow 2010 and Glasgow 2011.

=== Global Powerlifting Committee / GPC-GB (TEAM GB) ===
In 2016, after taking a break from the sport due to injury and illness, Morgan returned with the Global Powerlifting Committee (GPC) by reaching their qualifying standard to represent Great Britain in the World Championships in Trutnov, Czech Republic 2017.

Since joining GPC, he has taken a Gold Medal in Masters 1 ( World Championships, Trutnov Czech Republic 2017), Gold Medal in Masters 2 (European Championships, Nancy France 2018) and a Gold Medal in Masters 2 (World Championships, Eger, Hungary 2018). He has also qualified for the second time as an International Category referee in June 2017 with Global Powerlifting Committee.

In 2023 Chris returned to the international platform again taking a Gold Medal in Masters 3 at the European Championships in Glasgow.

=== Career Record ===
World Championship Gold Medals 10

European Championship Gold Medals 4

Gay Games Championship Gold Medals 6

British Championship Gold Medals 18

British Championship Best lifter Awards 6

European Championship Best Lifter Awards 1

World Records 3

British Records 4

=== Gay Games ===
Morgan competed in several Gay Games, an event mainly for gay sportspeople. He won silver in Amsterdam 1998, gold in Sydney 2002 four golds in Chicago 2006 and Gold in Cologne 2010. He holds Gay Games records in squat, deadlift and overall poundage in the 75 kilo class and in the 82.5 kilo class he holds records in squat, deadlift and overall poundage.

=== LGBT Powerlifting Union - LGBT International Powerlifting Championships ===
Chris Morgan was the Co-President of the LGBT Powerlifting Union between 2017 and 2023 and was the Meet Director for the LGBT International Powerlifting Championships that happened in 2017, 2018, 2019 and 2022.

In July 2018, Morgan was awarded a Lifetime achievement award by the lifters of LGBT IPC for his service and commitment by the LGBT Powerlifting community.

In May 2023, Morgan moved to the position of Founding President, with the original objectives of the LGBTPU achieved in restoring the sport of Powerlifting back to the Gay Games.

== Personal life and activism ==
Chris Morgan is openly gay. He supports a number of charities and sports organizations. In 2004, he became a global ambassador to the Federation of Gay Games.

Morgan was a member of the Football Association's Advisory Group on Homophobia from 2004 to 2008 and was sponsored by sportswear manufacturer Umbro between 2004 and 2006. With Umbro, he was the first person to be permitted by the Football Association to wear the official England national football team kit, other than the team itself.

In 2015, he was inducted into the National Gay and Lesbian Sports Hall of Fame.
