= Christopher Kaui Morgan =

Hawaiian choreographer

Christopher Kaui Morgan is a Native Hawaiian choreographer, performer, and curator. Morgan is known for creating multimedia dance works that explore identity and belonging. In March 2022, he was appointed by President Joe Biden to the National Council on the Arts. He currently serves as the artistic director of Malashock Dance.

== Early life and education ==
Christopher Kaui Morgan was born and raised in Orange County, California, by parents of Native Hawaiian descent. During his youth, he was introduced to performance through the traditional hula and Polynesian dances passed down by his family.

Morgan began formal training in Western dance disciplines—including ballet, jazz, and modern dance—at the age of 17. He pursued his higher education at the University of California, Irvine, where he studied these contemporary forms and prepared for a professional career in performance.

== Career ==
=== Early career and CKM&A ===
Morgan began his professional performing career in 1995 as a dancer with Malashock Dance in San Diego, California. In 2011, he founded his own contemporary dance company, Christopher K. Morgan & Artists (CKM&A). That same year, Dance Magazine profiled him as one of six choreographers "Taking Off" in the United States.

=== Arts administration and advocacy ===
Morgan has held several high-profile leadership roles within the American performing arts ecosystem:

- Dance Place: He previously served as the Executive Artistic Director of the prominent Washington, D.C. arts venue and school.
- Maui Arts & Cultural Center: From 2022 to 2023, he served as the Vice President of Programming, curating music, theater, and dance events.
- Malashock Dance: In January 2024, Morgan returned to his former dance company to take over as its artistic director.

=== Public service and board memberships ===
A vocal advocate for cultural integrity, Indigenous representation, and inclusivity in dance, Morgan serves extensively on national arts boards. He is a member of the National Performance Network board, the Association of Performing Arts Professionals’ Equitable Partnership Working Group, and the Western Arts Alliance's Advancing Indigenous Performance Committee.

Following his presidential nomination, the United States Congress confirmed Morgan's appointment to the National Council on the Arts on March 15, 2022, where he advises the National Endowment for the Arts (NEA) on grants and policies.

=== Wehiwehi ===
Morgan is the founder of Wehiwehi, a gathering of Native Hawaiian artists working at the intersection of contemporary performing arts and indigeneity.

== Awards and honors ==
Morgan has received several institutional fellowships, artistic awards, and national honors in recognition of his choreography, performance career, and leadership within the performing arts sector.

- 2013: Awarded a NACF Artist Fellowship by the Native Arts + Cultures Foundation, an unrestricted grant to support his choreography.
- 2017: Awarded an Individual Artist Award / Fellowship in Dance by the Arts and Humanities Council of Montgomery County.
- 2018: Named a Native Launchpad Artist by the Western Arts Alliance (WAA), and part of the inaugural cohort of Indigenous artists.
- 2022: Nominated by President Joe Biden and confirmed by the United States Congress to the National Council on the Arts.
- 2022: Creative Capital Awardee
- 2022: Received the Mentoring Award from the Western Arts Alliance, recognizing excellence in mentoring and a committed contribution to the professional advancement of the Western performing arts community.

== Selected choreographic works ==
Morgan has created a robust body of contemporary dance and dance-theater repertoire since the mid-2000s, primarily premiered through his company, Christopher K. Morgan & Artists (CKM&A). His work is frequently characterized by the integration of modern dance with storytelling, multimedia design, and explorations of his Native Hawaiian identity.

The following is a chronological list of select works choreographed by Christopher Kaui Morgan:

- 2004: The Measure of a Man
- 2005: Rice
- 2014: By the Inch
- 2016: Pōhaku (evening-length solo incorporating hula)
- 2020: Native Intelligence / Innate Intelligence
