= Heartbeat Opera =

Opera company in New York City

- Formation: 2014
- Founder: Ethan Heard, Louisa Proske
- Purpose: Staging opera productions
- Website: heartbeatopera.org

Heartbeat Opera is an American opera company located in New York City. It was founded by Ethan Heard and Louisa Proske in 2014 after their graduation from Yale School of Drama's directing program and is currently run by executive director Christian De Gré Cárdenas, artistic director Jacob Ashworth, and music director Dan Schlosberg. Peregrine Teng Heard is a frequent librettist and dramaturg.

The company does not have a permanent home venue but instead stages productions at various New York City sites such as the Baruch Performing Arts Center and Irondale as well as venues outside the city.

The company produces adaptations of classic operas, typically with abridgments, smaller and sometimes unusual instrumental ensembles, and other modifications and modernizations with the aim to "breathe urgency into a classic" and reimagine classics for modern times. Seasons usually include a winter production, a spring production, and an opera-themed drag show in the fall. The company introduced opera to the Williamstown Theater Festival in the summer of 2025.
