= Eun Young Lee =

South Korean composer

- Education: Ewha Womans University; Manhattan School of Music; University of Chicago
- Occupation: Composer
- Employer: Boston Conservatory at Berklee
- Awards: Guggenheim Fellowship (2023)

Academic background
- Thesis: Sori (2011)
- Doctoral advisor: Shulamit Ran
- Musical career
- Genres: Classical music

Eun Young Lee is a South Korean composer based in the United States. She is a 2023 Guggenheim Fellow and an associate professor at the Boston Conservatory at Berklee.

== Biography ==
Eun Young Lee studied at Ewha Womans University where she obtained a BM and MM in music theory, and the Manhattan School of Music, where she obtained her MM in composition. She obtained her PhD in Composition from the University of Chicago in 2011; her doctoral dissertation Sori was supervised by Shulamit Ran.

She won the first-place prize at the 2006 Tsang-Houei Hsu International Music Composition Competition. In 2010, she was awarded a MacDowell Fellowship, for work on her commissions for the Sejong Cultural Society and University of Cincinnati – College-Conservatory of Music, as well as a Virginia Center for the Creative Arts Fellowship. In 2014, she started working at the Boston Conservatory at Berklee, where she then became associate professor of composition.

David Schulenberg praised Antico Moderno's 2016 performance of her piece Gil as "imaginative use of the ensemble’s distinctive sonorities". One of her pieces, "Mool", was performed in Liza Stepanova's 2017 piano album E Pluribus Unum.

She was awarded a Guggenheim Fellow in Music Composition in 2023 and another MacDowell Fellowship in 2024; she used both of them for her piece Pax Aeterna, inspired by the Korean conflict and folk music from both Koreas. One of her composed pieces, "Nam-Ok Lee", was featured on pianist Jihye Chang's 2024 album Boston Etudes.
