= Nils Vigeland =

American composer

Nils Vigeland (born 1950 in Buffalo, New York) is an American composer and pianist.

== Career ==
Vigeland made his professional debut as a pianist in 1969 with the Buffalo Philharmonic Orchestra. He later studied composition with Lukas Foss at Harvard College, graduating with a B.A. in 1972. He earned his Ph.D at The University at Buffalo where he studied composition with Morton Feldman and piano with Yvar Mikhashoff. After graduation, Vigeland toured for eight years with percussionist Jan Williams and flautist Eberhard Blum, performing extended length works for flute, percussion and piano that Feldman composed for them.

From 1980 to 1989, Vigeland directed The Bowery Ensemble, which gave an annual series of concerts in Cooper Union, NYC. The ensemble was strongly associated with the music of the New York School and gave the first performance of over thirty works by composers including Pauline Oliveros, Christian Wolff, Leo Smit, Chris Newman and John Thow.

Recordings of Vigeland's music are available from Mode, EMF, Focus, Lovely Music, and Naxos. His choral music is published by Boosey and Hawkes. He taught at Manhattan School of Music for thirty years, retiring as Chair of the Composition Department in 2013.

== Notable students ==
- Christopher Cerrone
- Ted Hearne
- Reiko Fueting
- Scott Wollschleger
- Juan Pablo Contreras
- Eun Young Lee
