= Yvar Mikhashoff =

American classical composer

Yvar Emilian Mikhashoff (born Ronald Mackay; March 8, 1941, in Troy, New York – October 11, 1993, in Buffalo, New York) was an American virtuoso pianist and composer. He is best known for his performance of contemporary classical music.

Mikhashoff studied at the Eastman School of Music, the Juilliard School, and the University of Houston, and received his doctorate in composition from the University of Texas in 1972. He also studied in France with Nadia Boulanger. He served as Professor of Music at the University at Buffalo, The State University of New York from 1973 until his death from AIDS, in 1993, aged 52.

From 1983 to 1991 he commissioned no fewer than 127 tangos for solo piano from 127 composers.

Mikhashoff was considered one of the leading performers of contemporary piano music of his day. He worked closely with composers all over the world, including leading figures like John Cage, Morton Feldman, Giacinto Scelsi, Per Nørgård, Poul Ruders, and numerous others. In addition to his performance schedule, he also did a lot of artistic advisory work, like working with Pierre Audi at the Almeida Festival in London, for many years the leading London venue for contemporary music programming, and likewise at the formation of the Music Factory festival in Bergen, Norway, with Geir Johnson.

A complete archive of Mikhashoff's works is held by the Music Library of University at Buffalo Libraries at the University at Buffalo, The State University of New York.

In 1996 the Yvar Mikhashoff Trust for New Music was established to support composers and performers of new music. Past notable recipients include: The Barton Workshop, New Music Consort, North/South Consonance, Nick Fortunato, and Daniel N. Seel

The four CD set "Yvar Mikhashoff's Panorama of American Piano Music" presents one of Mikhashoff's marathon concerts on a single theme. It explores the diversity of 20th century American music, including serialism, minimalism, populist and avant garde experimentalism. His arrangements of extracts from Puccini operas have been recorded by the French pianist Jean-Yves Thibaudet.
