= Burgh =

Former autonomous corporate entity in Scotland and Northern England

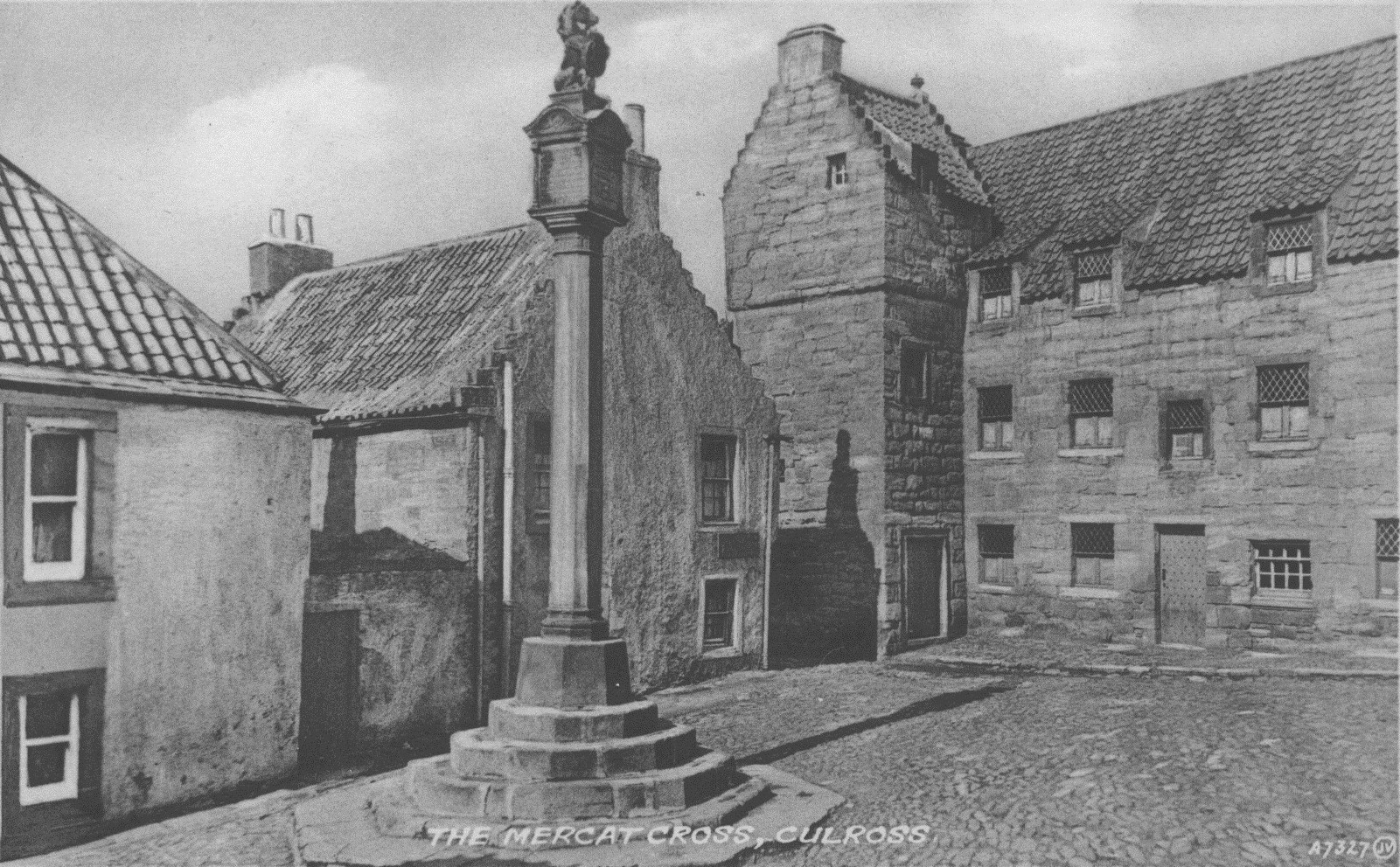
The Royal Burgh of Culross in Fife

A burgh (/ˈbʌrə/ BURR-ə) is an autonomous municipal corporation in Scotland, usually a city, town, or toun in Scots. This type of administrative division existed from the 12th century, when King David I created the first royal burghs. Burgh status was broadly analogous to borough status, found in the rest of the United Kingdom. Following local government reorganisation in 1975, the title of "royal burgh" remains in use in many towns, but now has little more than ceremonial value.

== History ==
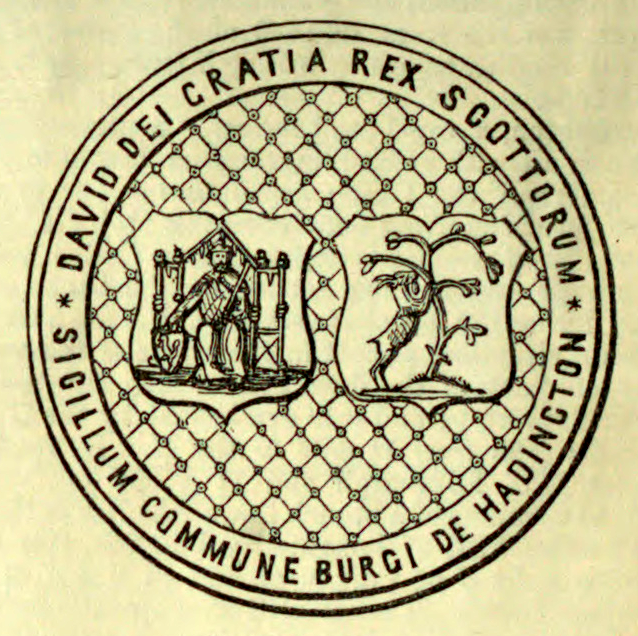
Seal of Haddington town: "David Dei Gratia Rex Scottorum. Sigillum commune burgi de Hadington"

The first burgh was Berwick. By 1130, David I (r. 1124–53) had established other burghs including Edinburgh, Stirling, Dunfermline, Haddington, Perth, Dumfries, Jedburgh, Montrose, Rutherglen and Lanark. Most of the burghs granted charters in his reign probably already existed as settlements. Charters were copied almost verbatim from those used in England, and early burgesses usually invited English and Flemish settlers. They were able to impose tolls and fines on traders within a region outside their settlements. Properties known as Burgage tenures were a key feature, whose tenants had to be of the Burgher class, known as a "Burgesses", and therefore eligible to participate in trade within the town, and to elect town officials. Most of the early burghs were on the east coast, and among them were the largest and wealthiest, including Old and New Aberdeen, Berwick, Perth and Edinburgh, whose growth was facilitated by trade with other North Sea ports on the continent, in particular in the Low Countries, as well as ports on the Baltic Sea. In the south-west, Glasgow, Ayr and Kirkcudbright were aided by the less profitable sea trade with Ireland and to a lesser extent France and Spain.

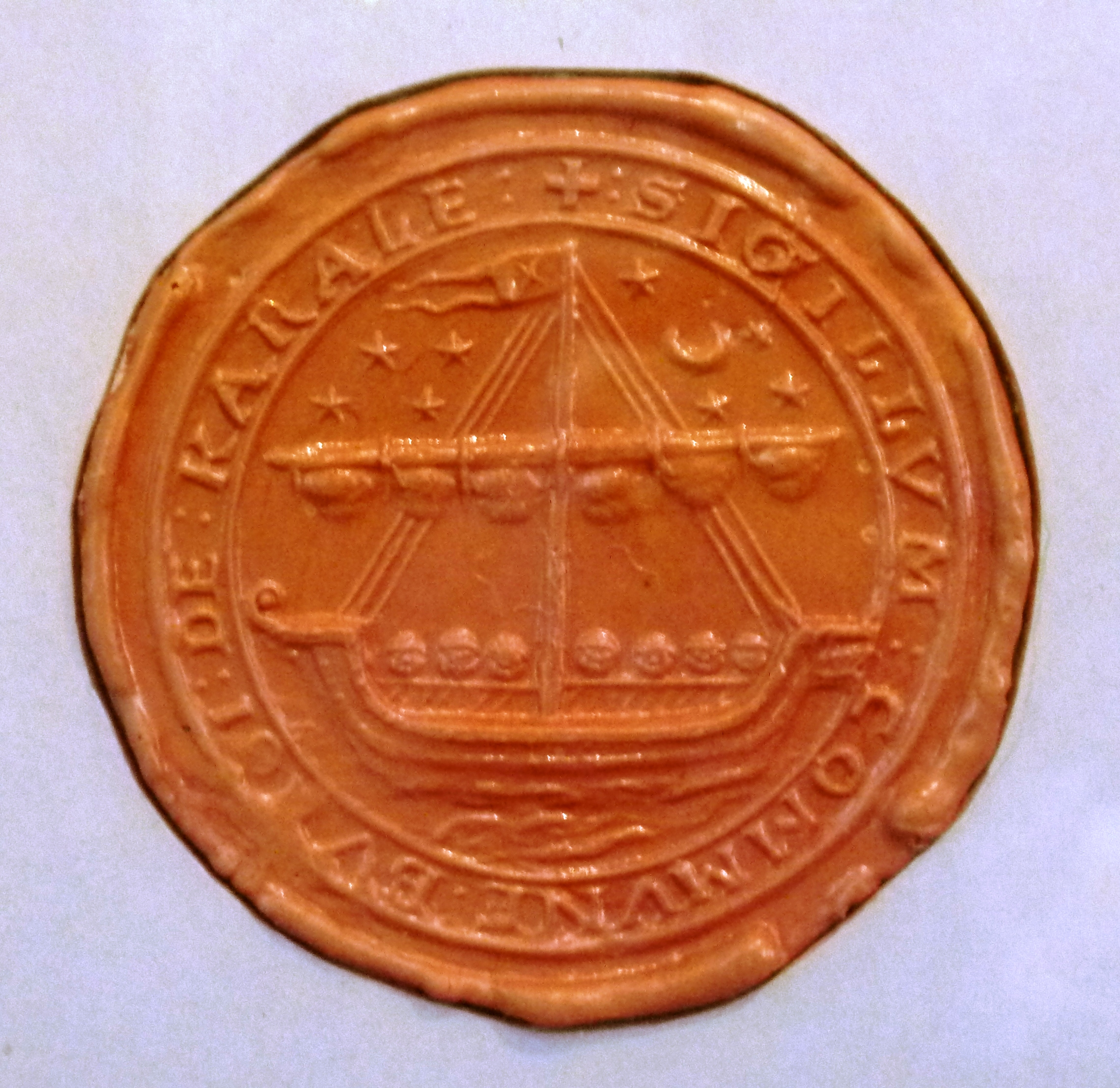
Reverse side of the burgh seal of Crail, a Fife fishing port

Burghs were typically settlements under the protection of a castle and usually had a market place, with a widened high street or junction, marked by a mercat cross, beside houses for the burgesses and other inhabitants. The founding of 16 royal burghs can be traced to the reign of David I (1124–53) and there is evidence of 55 burghs by 1296. In addition to the major royal burghs, the late Middle Ages saw the proliferation of baronial and ecclesiastical burghs, with 51 created between 1450 and 1516. Most of these were much smaller than their royal counterparts. Excluded from foreign trade, they acted mainly as local markets and centres of craftsmanship. Burghs were centres of basic crafts, including the manufacture of shoes, clothes, dishes, pots, joinery, bread and ale, which would normally be sold to "indwellers" and "outdwellers" on market days. In general, burghs carried out far more local trading with their hinterlands, on which they relied for food and raw materials, than trading nationally or abroad.

Burghs had rights to representation in the Parliament of Scotland. Under the Acts of Union of 1707 many became parliamentary burghs, represented in the Parliament of Great Britain. Under the Scottish Reform Act 1832, 32 years after the merger of the Parliament of Great Britain into the Parliament of the United Kingdom, the boundaries of burghs for parliamentary elections ceased to be necessarily their boundaries for other purposes.

=== Types ===
There were several types of burgh, including;

- Royal burgh, founded by royal charter.
- Burgh of regality, granted to a nobleman or "lord of regality".
- Burgh of barony, granted to a tenant-in-chief, with narrower powers.
- Parliamentary burgh or burgh constituency, a type of parliamentary constituency.
- Police burgh, a burgh operating a "police system" of town government.

=== Modern history ===
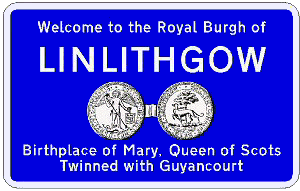
A sign in Linlithgow, Scotland

Until 1833, each burgh had a different constitution or "sett". The government of the burgh was often in the hands of a self-nominating corporation, and few local government functions were performed: these were often left to ad hoc bodies.

Two pieces of reforming legislation were enacted in 1833: The Royal Burghs (Scotland) Act 1833 (3 & 4 Will. 4. c. 76) and the Burgh Police (Scotland) Act 1833 (3 & 4 Will. 4. c. 46).

The Royal Burghs (Scotland) Act 1833 (3 & 4 Will. 4. c. 76) provided for the election of magistrates and councillors. Each burgh was to have a common council consisting of a provost (or lord provost), magistrates (or bailies) and councillors. Every parliamentary elector living within the "royalty" or area of the royal burgh, or within seven statute miles of its boundary, was entitled to vote in burgh elections. One third of the common council was elected each year. The councillors selected a number of their members to be bailies, who acted as a magistrates bench for the burgh and dealt with such issues as licensing. The provost, or chief magistrate, was elected from among the council every three years. The Royal Burghs Act was also extended to the 12 parliamentary burghs which had recently been enfranchised. These were growing industrial centres, and apart from the lack of a charter, they had identical powers and privileges to the royal burghs. Royal Burghs retained the right to corporate property or "common good". This property was used for the advantage of the inhabitants of the burgh, funding such facilities as public parks, museums and civic events.

The Burgh Police (Scotland) Act 1833 (3 & 4 Will. 4. c. 46) allowed the inhabitants of royal burghs, burghs of regality and of barony to adopt a "police system". "Police" in this sense did not refer to law enforcement, but to various local government activities summarised in the act as "paving, lighting, cleansing, watching, supplying with water, and improving such Burghs respectively, as may be necessary and expedient". The act could be adopted following its approval in a poll of householders in the burgh. Burghs reformed or created under this and later legislation became known as police burghs. The governing body of a police burgh were the police commissioners. The commissioners were elected by the existing town council of the burgh, not by the electorate at large. The town council of a burgh could by a three-quarters majority become police commissioners for the burgh. In many cases this led to the existence of two parallel burgh administrations, the town council and the police commissioners, each with the same membership, but separate legal identity and powers. Further legislation, the Police (Scotland) Act 1850 (13 & 14 Vict. c. 33), allowed "populous places" other than existing burghs to become police burghs.

In 1893, most of the anomalies in the administration of burghs were removed: police commissioners were retitled as councillors and all burghs were to consist of a single body corporate, ending the existence of parallel burghs. All burghs of barony and regality that had not adopted a police system were abolished. Councils were to be headed by a chief magistrate using the "customary title" of the burgh. In 1900, the chief magistrate of every burgh was to be known as the provost – except in burghs granted a lord provost.

The last major legislation to effect burghs came into effect in 1930. The Local Government (Scotland) Act 1929 (19 & 20 Geo. 5. c. 25) divided burghs into three classes:

- "Counties of cities": the four largest royal burghs, they combined the powers of a burgh and county council.
- "Large burghs": independent of the county council except in major services such as police and education.
- "Small burghs": performing minor local government functions such as street-cleaning, housing, lighting and drainage.

The Local Government (Scotland) Act 1973 (c. 65) formally abolished burghs. Section 1(5) of the act stated: On 16 May 1975, all local government areas existing immediately before that date, that is to say, all counties, counties of cities, large burghs, small burghs and districts, shall cease to exist, and the council of every such area shall also cease to exist. The use of the title continues in informal use, however.

The common good properties and funds of the royal burghs continue to exist. They are administered by the present area councils, who must make "have regard to the interests of the inhabitants of the area to which the common good formerly related". The use of these assets are to be for the benefit of the inhabitants of the former burgh. Any person or body holding the honorary freedom of any place... formerly having the status of a city, burgh or royal burgh continued to enjoy that status after the 1975 reorganisation.

== Features ==
=== Provost ===
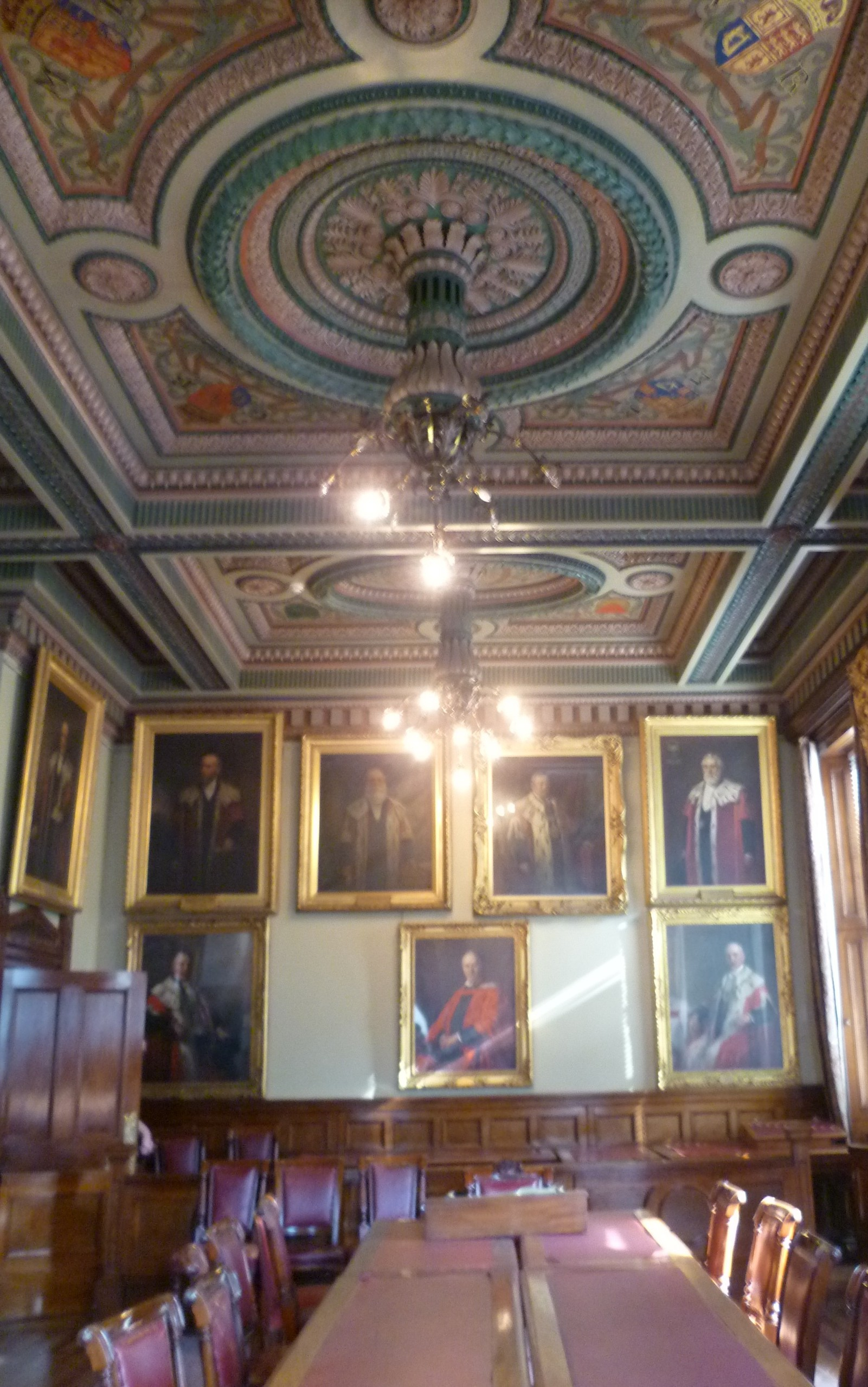
The Council Chamber in Leith which ceased to be an autonomous burgh in 1920

The chief magistrate or convener of a burgh, equivalent to a mayor, was called a provost. Many different titles were in use until the Town Councils (Scotland) Act 1900 standardised the term as "provost", except in cities with a lord provost. Since 1975 local authorities have been free to choose the title of their convener and provosts are appointed to chair a number of area and community councils.

=== Bailies ===
Under the provost were magistrates or baillies who both acted as councillors, and in the enforcement of laws. As well as general tasks, they often had specific tasks such as inspecting wine, or ale, or other products sold at market. The title of bailie ceased to have any statutory meaning in 1975, although modern area councils do sometimes make appointments to the office on a purely ceremonial basis. For example, Glasgow City Council grants the title in an honorary capacity to senior councillors, while Stirling Council appoints four bailies to act in lieu of the provost in specific geographical areas.

=== Burgesses ===
A resident granted the rights of a "freeman" of the burgh, was styled a burgess (pl. burgesses), a title also used in English boroughs. These freemen and their wives were a class which did not include dependants (e.g. apprentices) and servants, though they were not guaranteed to be wealthy.

=== Dean of Guild ===
This was a title held by one of the bailies of the burgh who presided over a Dean of Guild Court which was given the specific duty of building control. The courts were abolished in 1975, with building regulation transferred to the relevant local authority. Appointments to the office of Dean of Guild are still made in some areas: for instance the Lord Dean of Guild of Glasgow is described as the "second citizen of Glasgow" after the Lord Provost although the appointment is in the hands of the Merchants House of Glasgow, and not the city council.

=== Trading privileges ===
Early Burghs were granted the power to trade, which allowed them to control trade until the 19th century. The population of burgesses could be roughly divided between merchants and craftsmen, and the tensions between the interests of the two classes was often a feature of the cities. Craftsmen were usually organised into guilds. Merchants also had a guild, but many merchants did not belong to it, and it would be run by a small group of the most powerful merchants. The class of merchants included all traders, from stall-holders and pack-men to shop-holders and traders of considerable wealth.

== Etymology ==
As used in this article, the Scots language word burgh is derived from the Old English Burh. In Scotland it refers to corporate entities whose legality is peculiar to Scotland. (Scottish law was protected and preserved as distinct from laws of England under the Acts of Union of 1707.) Another variant pronunciation, /brʌf/, is heard in several Cumbrian place names, e.g. Burgh by Sands, Longburgh, Drumburgh, Mayburgh Henge.

The English language borough, like the Scots Burgh, is derived from the same Old English language word burh (whose dative singular and nominative/accusative plural form byrig sometimes underlies modern place-names, and which had dialectal variants including "burg"; it was also sometimes confused with beorh, beorg, 'mound, hill', on which see Hall 2001, 69–70). The Old English word was originally used for a fortified town or proto-castle (e.g. at Dover Castle or Burgh Castle) and was related to the verb beorgan (cf. Dutch and German bergen) 'to keep, save, make secure'. In the German language, Burg means 'castle' or 'fortress', though so many towns grew up around castles that it almost came to mean city, and is incorporated into many placenames, such as Hamburg, Flensburg and Strasburg.

The word has cognates in other Germanic languages. For example, burg in German, and borg in both Danish and Swedish. The equivalent word is also to be found in Frisian, Dutch, Norwegian, Icelandic and Faroese. Burgh in placenames is found in its greatest UK concentration in the East Anglia region of southern England, where also the word has taken the form bury, as in Canterbury.

A number of other European languages have cognate words which were borrowed from the Germanic languages during the Middle Ages, including brog in Irish, bwr or bwrc, meaning 'wall, rampart' in Welsh, bourg in French, borgo in Italian, and burgo in Spanish (hence the place-name Burgos).

The most obviously derivative words are burgher in English, Bürger in German or burger in Dutch (literally 'citizen', with connotations of middle-class in English and other Germanic languages). Also related are the words bourgeois and belfry (both from the French), and burglar. More distantly, it is related to words meaning 'hill' or 'mountain' in a number of languages (cf. the second element of iceberg).

== Toponymy ==
Burgh is commonly used as a suffix in place names in Great Britain, particularly Scotland and northern England, and other places where Britons settled, examples:

=== England ===
Examples:

- Alburgh
- Aldeburgh
- Bamburgh
- Barnburgh
- Bawburgh
- Blythburgh
- Burghfield
- Carrawburgh
- Chedburgh
- Dickleburgh
- Drumburgh
- Dunstanburgh
- Fleggburgh
- Flookburgh
- Grundisburgh
- Happisburgh
- Hoo St Werburgh
- Ickburgh
- Kettleburgh
- Longburgh
- Mayburgh Henge
- Newburgh (disambiguation)
- Oxburgh Hall
- Rumburgh
- Ryburgh
- Shuckburgh
- Smallburgh
- Southburgh
- St Werburghs
- Tasburgh
- Whinburgh
- Winfrith Newburgh
- Yarburgh

=== Scotland ===
- Branderburgh
- Dryburgh
- Edinburgh
- Fraserburgh
- Helensburgh
- Jedburgh
- Leverburgh
- Maryburgh
- Musselburgh
- Newburgh (disambiguation)
- Osnaburgh
- Roxburgh
- Salsburgh
- Winchburgh
- Williamsburgh
- Kingsburgh, Skye

=== Other ===
- Pittsburgh, Pennsylvania, United States
- Harrisburg, Pennsylvania, United States
- Greenburgh, New York, United States
- Hamptonburgh, New York, United States
- Plattsburgh, New York, United States
- Newburgh, New York, United States
- Williamsburg, Brooklyn, United States
- Williamsburg, Virginia, United States
- Edinburgh, Indiana, United States
- Edithburgh, South Australia
- Enosburg Falls, Vermont, United States
- Louisburgh, County Mayo, Ireland

And as a placename on its own, in the West Germanic countries:

- Burgh, Renfrewshire, Scotland
- Burgh (Netherlands) - a town in the Netherlands in the municipality of Schouwen-Duiveland.
- Burgh, Suffolk, England
- Burgh by Sands, Cumbria, England (pronounced Bruff by Sands)
- Burgh Castle, Suffolk, England
- Burgh le Marsh, Lincolnshire, England
- Burgh on Bain, Lincolnshire, England
- Burgh Island, Devon, England
- Burgh next Aylsham, Norfolk, England
- Burgh St Margaret, Norfolk, England
- Burgh St Peter, Norfolk, England
- Burgh Hill, (Wealdon), Sussex
- Burgh Hill, (Rother), Sussex
- Burgh Heath, Surrey

== See also ==
- Cities of Scotland
- Borough
- -bury
- Convention of Royal Burghs
- Five Burghs
- List of burghs in Scotland
- List of UK place names with royal patronage
- Royal burgh
