= Newberg =

Newberg may refer to:

== Places in the United States ==
- Newberg, California, former name of Newburg, California
- Newberg, Oregon
- Newberg, Wisconsin, former name of Stone Bank, Wisconsin
- Newberg Corners, Wisconsin, an unincorporated community
- Newberg Township, Michigan

== Other uses ==
- Lobster Newberg
- Newberg (surname)
- Newberg School District, Oregon
- Newberg High School, Oregon

== See also ==
- Newborough (disambiguation)
- Newburg (disambiguation)
- Newburgh (disambiguation)
