= Newburg =

Newburg may refer to:

- Newburg, Alabama, a place in Alabama
- Newburg, Arkansas, a place in Arkansas
- Newburg, California
- Newburg, former name of Fort Dick, California
- Newburg, Illinois
- Newburg, Jasper County, Iowa
- Newburg, Louisville, Kentucky
- Newburg, Maryland
- Newburg, Lenawee County, Michigan
- Newburg, Shiawassee County, Michigan
- Newburg, Minnesota
- Newburg, Missouri
- Newburg, Wyoming County, New York
- Newburg, North Dakota
- Newburg, Blair County, Pennsylvania
- Newburg, Clearfield County, Pennsylvania
- Newburg, Cumberland County, Pennsylvania
- Newburg, Huntingdon County, Pennsylvania, a place in Pennsylvania
- Newburg, Northampton County, Pennsylvania
- Newburg, Texas
- Newburg, West Virginia
- Newburg, Wisconsin

== See also ==
- Newberg (disambiguation)
- Newborough (disambiguation)
- Newburgh (disambiguation)
- Newburg Township (disambiguation)
- Lobster Newburg
