= Burgh by Sands Castle =

Castle in Cumbria, England

Coordinates: 54.92321702°N 3.03507288°W

Burgh by Sands Castle was located near the village of Burgh by Sands, Cumbria, England.

The castle was located to the east of the village. A fortified manor house is known in the 12th century. A circular tower was added to the house in the 13th century. It was the caput of the barony of Burgh by Sands.

Originally held by Robert d'Estrivers, it passed by marriage of his daughter and heiress Ibria to Ranulf de Engaine. It later passed by the heiress Ada to Simon de Morville and then Thomas de Multon.

The castle was destroyed in 1339 during a raid by a Scottish army and was never rebuilt. No remains are evident above ground.
