= Sam Rappaport =

Sam Rappaport may refer to:

- Samuel Rappaport (1932–2016), Democratic member of the Pennsylvania House of Representatives
- Sam Rappaport (One Life to Live), a character from the American soap opera One Life to Live
