= Boustead Hill =

Hamlet in Cumbria, England

Coordinates: 54.921°N 3.104°W

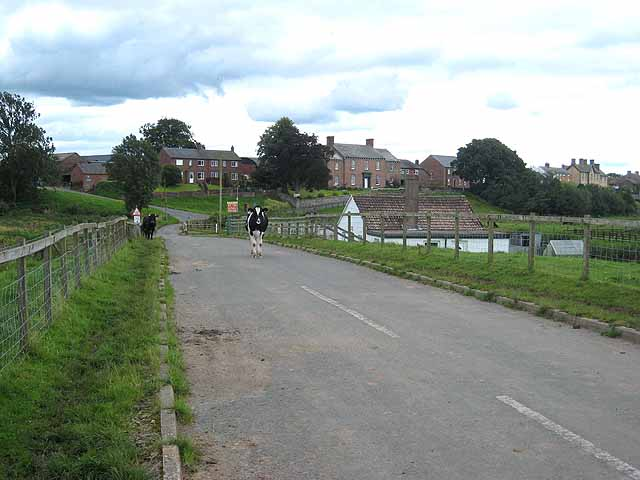
- Boustead Hill

- Location in the former Carlisle district, Cumbria Location within Cumbria
- OS grid reference: NY292590
- Civil parish: Burgh by Sands
- Unitary authority: Cumberland
- Ceremonial county: Cumbria
- Region: North West
- Country: England
- Sovereign state: United Kingdom
- Post town: CARLISLE
- Postcode district: CA5
- Dialling code: 01228
- Police: Cumbria
- Fire: Cumbria
- Ambulance: North West
- UK Parliament: Carlisle

Boustead Hill is a hamlet in Cumbria, England. In 1831 the township had a population of 63.

It is located close to the site where the famous Solway Firth Spaceman photograph was taken.

== See also ==
- Listed buildings in Burgh by Sands
