= Ben Waxman =

American journalist and politician (1985-)

- Waxman in 2026

Member of the Pennsylvania House of Representatives from the 182nd district
- Incumbent
- Assumed office January 3, 2023
- Preceded by: Brian Sims

Personal details
- Born: Benjamin R. Waxman; February 9, 1985 (age 41) Montgomery County, Pennsylvania, U.S.
- Party: Democratic
- Spouse: Julie Wertheimer
- Education: Juniata College (BA)
- Occupation: Journalist and political activist

Benjamin R. Waxman (born February 9, 1985) is an American journalist, progressive activist and politician. He is the Representative for District 182 of the Pennsylvania House of Representatives. Waxman previously served as an editorial writer for The Philadelphia Daily News and a reporter for WHYY-FM and as a political aide to State Senator Vincent Hughes and Philadelphia District Attorney Larry Krasner.

== Early life and education ==
Waxman was raised in Montgomery County, Pennsylvania. Raised in an apolitical family, his father Michael is a realtor and his mother Barbara Buonocore worked as a nurse. Waxman's father owned a glass business in Germantown, Philadelphia, which closed, in part, after The Home Depot opened competing stores in the area. He credits the incident as shaping his political outlook. Waxman became involved with activism at a young age and as a high schooler, he served as a leader of Unite for Peace, an anti-war organization in Philadelphia that was created following the September 11th attacks. Additionally, Waxman served on the board of Pennsylvania Abolitionists United Against the Death Penalty. He graduated from Springfield Township High School in 2003. He received a college scholarship from the American Civil Liberties Union for his work in opposition to the death penalty. Waxman attended Juniata College and graduated in 2007.

== Career ==
Waxman speaking at a SEIU 32BJ rally in 2015.

=== Journalism career ===
As a college student, Waxman wrote left-leaning opinion pieces for The Huntingdon Daily News and served as a Field Reporter for Generation Progress. These experiences lead to him becoming a journalist after college. From 2008 to 2011, Waxman worked as an opinion columnist for The Philadelphia Daily News and as a reporter WHYY-FM. He focused on covering stories relating to city government and the flow of funds between state and local institutions. While with The Philadelphia Daily News, Waxman wrote multiple editorials in favor of marriage equality and the need for Pennsylvania to pass a non-discrimination law.

=== Press Secretary for Vincent Hughes ===
In 2013, Waxman was named Press Secretary for Pennsylvania State Senator Vincent Hughes, who represents District 7 which includes Montgomery and Philadelphia Counties. Waxman's work for Hughes was mainly focused on the Appropriation's Committee. While working for Hughes, Waxman also served as Press Secretary for the Pennsylvania Senate Democratic Caucus. Waxman left this position in February 2017 to join Larry Krasner's campaign for Philadelphia District Attorney.

=== Communications Director for Larry Krasner ===
Krasner was elected District Attorney of Philadelphia in 2017 and inaugurated in January 2018. As District Attorney, Krasner garnered national attention for his efforts to spearhead criminal justice reform. Waxman served as the Krasner's spokesperson and Director of Communications from January 2018 to May 2019 In this role, Waxman was often on the frontlines of pushing back against Krasner's critics, who believed Krasner's policies were responsible for violent crime and the rise in homicides in Philadelphia. He also advised on Krasner on sentencing reform. Waxman was featured in the 2021 documentary Philly D.A. that chronicled the Krasner administration. Waxman left his role as Communications Director for Krasner to focus full time on his consulting firm A. Waxman & Company where he helped advise Krasner's successful re-election bid in 2020.

=== Campaigns for State Representative ===
==== 2016 ====
In 2016, Waxman announced he would run for Pennsylvania State Representative in District 182 in a primary challenge against Democratic incumbent Brian Sims. Waxman's campaigned centered around increased funding for Philadelphia's public schools and he was endorsed by the Philadelphia Federation of Teachers. In a close race, Sims defeated Waxman by about 6% of the vote.

==== 2022 ====
Sims announced that he would not be running for re-election and instead would run for Lieutenant Governor. With the seat open, Waxman announced that he would once again run for state representative in the 182nd District. Waxman's platform is centered around a post-COVID-19 economic recovery, that takes into account equality, for Philadelphia. His campaign has been endorsed by Krasner, State Representative Morgan Cephas and Philadelphia City Councilmembers Maria Quiñones-Sánchez and Kenyatta Johnson. In a four way race, Waxman won the Democratic nomination, with 41% of the vote. In the heavily Democratic district, he faced Albert Robles Montas in the November 2022 general election and was elected with 89% of the vote.

== Personal life ==
Waxman's father is Jewish. Waxman's mother converted from Catholicism to become a Quaker before he was born. Waxman is a practicing Conservative Jew, who keeps kosher and is a member of Temple Beth Zion Beth Israel in Philadelphia. He is married to Julie Wertheimer, a former Philadelphia city government official and was a director at the Pew Charitable Trusts.

At the age of 20, Waxman was diagnosed with bipolar disorder and following the 2019 El Paso shooting, Waxman disclosed his own illness publicly after then-President Donald Trump blamed mental illness for the mass shooting. Writing for PoliticsPA, Waxman said that such rhetoric leads those who can be assisted to "hide their illnesses and not seek the treatment they need."

== Filmography ==
Television
| Year | Title | Role | Notes |
|---|---|---|---|
| 2021 | Philly D.A. | Himself | 8-part TV Series |
