= Babette Josephs =

American politician (1940–2021)

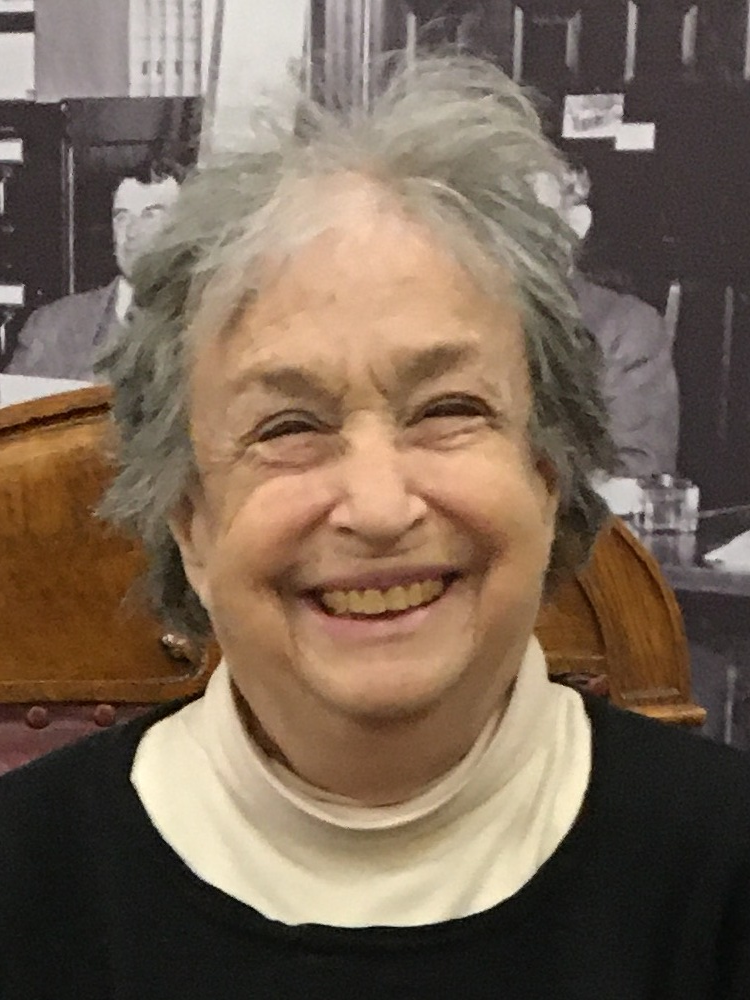
- Josephs in 2020

Member of the Pennsylvania House of Representatives from the 182nd district
- In office January 1, 1985 – November 30, 2012
- Preceded by: Samuel Rappaport
- Succeeded by: Brian Sims

Personal details
- Born: August 4, 1940 New York, New York, U.S.
- Died: August 27, 2021 (aged 81) Eugene, Oregon, U.S.
- Party: Democratic
- Spouse: Herbert B. Newberg (m. 1962; died 1992)
- Education: Queens College, City University of New York; Rutgers–Camden School of Law
- Profession: Attorney
- Website: http://www.babette.org/

Babette Josephs (August 4, 1940 – August 27, 2021) was a Democratic politician and attorney, who served 28 years in the Pennsylvania House of Representatives. Josephs was first elected in 1984, representing the 182nd Legislative District, which encompasses Center City and South Philadelphia. She held office through November 30, 2012. Josephs served as the Democratic chair of the House State Government Committee from 2001 to 2012. She was the senior woman in the General Assembly and convener of the Women's Caucus. In her role as state representative, she was an unabashed champion of progressive causes. Josephs was one of a few members of the Democratic Socialists of America to be elected to public office at the time.

== Early life, education and family ==
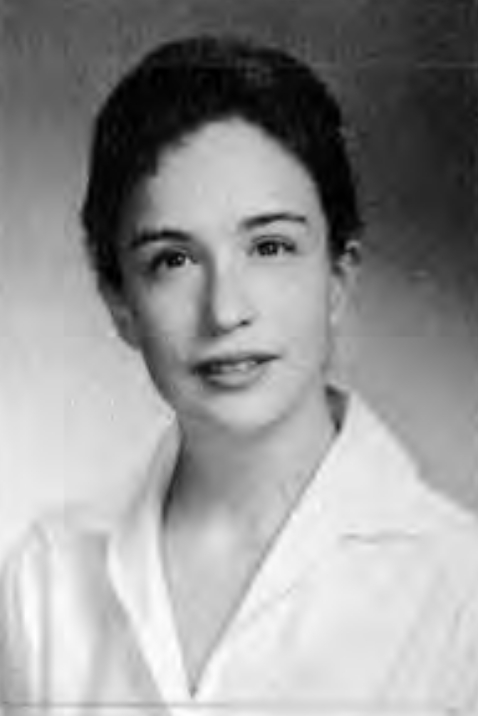
Josephs in the Queens College yearbook, 1962

Born in Manhattan on August 4, 1940, Josephs earned a Bachelor of Arts degree in 1962 at Queens College, and a Juris Doctor degree at Rutgers–Camden School of Law in 1976. In 1962 she wed Herbert Newberg in Queens. Married for three decades until Newberg's death at age 54, the couple had two children, a son and a daughter.

== Legislative career ==
In 2016, at an event sponsored by the City Center Residents Association, Josephs' career as a legislator was honored for her support of progressive and liberal causes:

While in office, she advocated for the rights of many who needed someone to speak out for them; among her causes were voting rights, women’s rights, gay and lesbian rights, children’s rights, separation of church and state, and other civil-liberty issues, energy efficiency, services for seniors and low-income people, and public education.

— Bonnie Eisenfeld

During her political career, Josephs served on a variety of legislative and party committees, chairing several:

- State Government Committee, Democratic Chair (2001–2012)
- Agriculture and Rural Affairs Committee, Member (2003–2012)
- Philadelphia Delegation, Co-Vice Chair
- Democratic Policy Committee, Member
- Women of the Pennsylvania General Assembly, Convener
- Select Committee on Information Technology Member (2008–2012)
- Advisory Board on Statewide Uniform Registry of Elections (SURE), Member (2001–2002)
- Joint Select Committee to Examine Election Issues, Member (2001–2002)
- House Appropriations Committee, Member (1993–2002)
- Health & Welfare Committee, Subcommittee Chair
- House Judiciary Committee, Secretary (1989–1990), Member (1987–1994 & 1997–2002)
- House Health and Human Services Committee, (1985–1992 & 1995–2002)
- Children and Youth Committee, Member (2001–2002)
- Intergovernmental Affairs Committee, Member (1999–2000)
- House Urban Affairs Committee, Member (1997–1998)
- Game and Fisheries Committee, Member (1989–1990)
- House Insurance Committee, Member (1985–1996)
- Professional Licensure Committee, Member (1985–1986)

== Civic Involvement ==
Before, during, and after her legislative tenure, Josephs was involved with a number of civic organizations, including the Philadelphia chapter of the American Civil Liberties Union, where she was a longtime board member, eventually serving as a Philadelphia-area delegate to the Board of the ACLU's statewide Pennsylvania affiliate. She was the co-founder (and later, executive director) of the National Abortion Rights Action League's Pennsylvania chapter, and of the Clara Bell Duvall Reproductive Freedom Project. She co-hosted "Conversations Across Time," a TV show that depicted challenging discussions with past historical personalities. She was active on the Justice for Nizah Morris Committee. She was active in the Philadelphia 8th Political Ward and also served on the board of the Jewish Social Policy Action Network.

== Previous occupations ==
Prior to her election to the legislature Josephs was active in law and political organizing.

- Executive Director of Citizens Coalition for Energy Efficiency 1980–1981
- Co-founder and Executive Director National Abortion Rights Action League PA (later renamed NARAL Pro-Choice America) and its foundation, the Clara Bell Duvall Education Fund, 1978 (later part of ACLU-PA)–1980
- Private law practice 1977–1979
- English Teacher in the Philadelphia Public High Schools 1963–1964

== Controversy ==
=== Pledge of allegiance ===
In October 2001, Josephs was the only House member to vote against a rule requiring students to recite the Pledge of Allegiance in public schools. The constitutionality of the law was later challenged, and in 2003, the United States District Court for the Eastern District of Pennsylvania struck down the law on constitutional grounds.

=== 2010 primary campaign ===
In April 2010, the political campaign of her Democratic primary opponent Gregg Kravitz gave to The Philadelphia Inquirer a tape of Josephs that was made by a Kravitz supporter who attended a Josephs fundraiser. In the tape, Josephs accused Kravitz of lying about his sexual orientation in order to pander to LGBT voters, a reportedly powerful bloc in the district. "I outed him as a straight person," Josephs said during a fund-raiser at the Black Sheep Pub & Restaurant, as some in the audience gasped or laughed, "and now he goes around telling people, quote, 'I swing both ways.' That's quite a respectful way to talk about sexuality. This guy's a gem." Kravitz denied stating that he is gay and asserted that he identifies as bisexual. However, he said he did not recall telling people that he "swings both ways" and that his sexuality was not a qualification for office, "I bring it up only in the context that it's important for the LGBT community to have a seat at the legislative table." He also added that it would be good for socially conservative lawmakers in the capital to work with an openly bisexual colleague. Josephs also called Kravitz a "trust-fund baby" with no discernible job history who was running for the House because he was bored, a charge also denied by Kravitz, who cited his work with a local congressional candidate. Mark Segal, publisher of the Philadelphia Gay News and a supporter of Josephs, said, "We've [the LGBT community] hit a new high point when candidates are accused of pretending to be gay to win a seat. I've been doing this for 40 years, and I never have heard of this kind of charge in any race in the nation. I take that as flattery. It shows how far we've come."

Josephs defeated Kravitz in the primary by 2,000 votes.

== 2012 defeat and failed 2014 challenge ==
In 2012, Josephs was defeated in the Democratic primary by Brian Sims by 226 votes.

In February 2014, Josephs challenged Rep. Brian Sims for the seat. Five hundred and ninety-nine signatures were collected for her for the ballot of the May 20 primary. These petitions were challenged by three Democratic voters, including Duncan Black, a well-known political blogger known as Atrios, alleging widespread forgery, among other claims.

On April 3, 2014, a Commonwealth Court judge, finding that Josephs was 4 signatures short of the 300 minimum required signatures, removed her from the ballot. The majority of the removed signatures were disqualified because the man collecting those signatures had provided a former address.

== Retirement ==
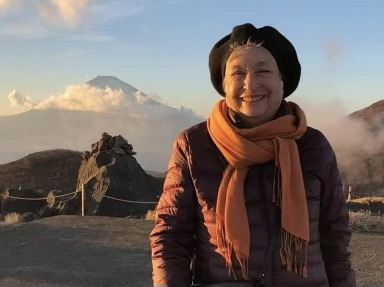
Josephs visiting Mount Fuji, Japan, in 2017

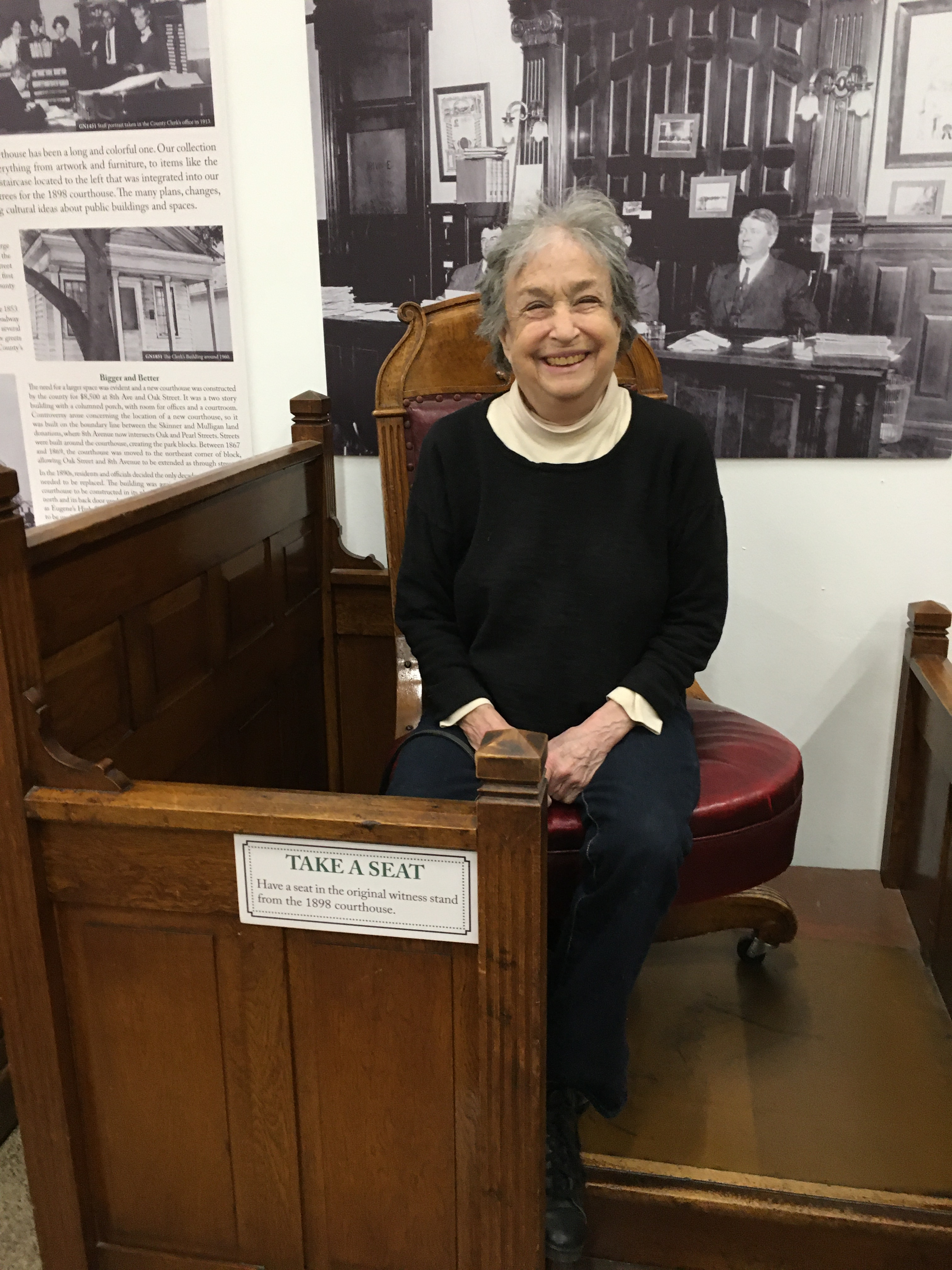
Josephs in historic jury box, Lane County History Museum, Eugene, Oregon in 2020

Josephs moved to Eugene, Oregon in 2019. She died August 27, 2021.

== See also ==
- List of Democratic Socialists of America members who have held office in the United States
