= Pennsylvania House of Representatives, District 182 =

American legislative district

Pennsylvania's 182nd State House of Representatives district
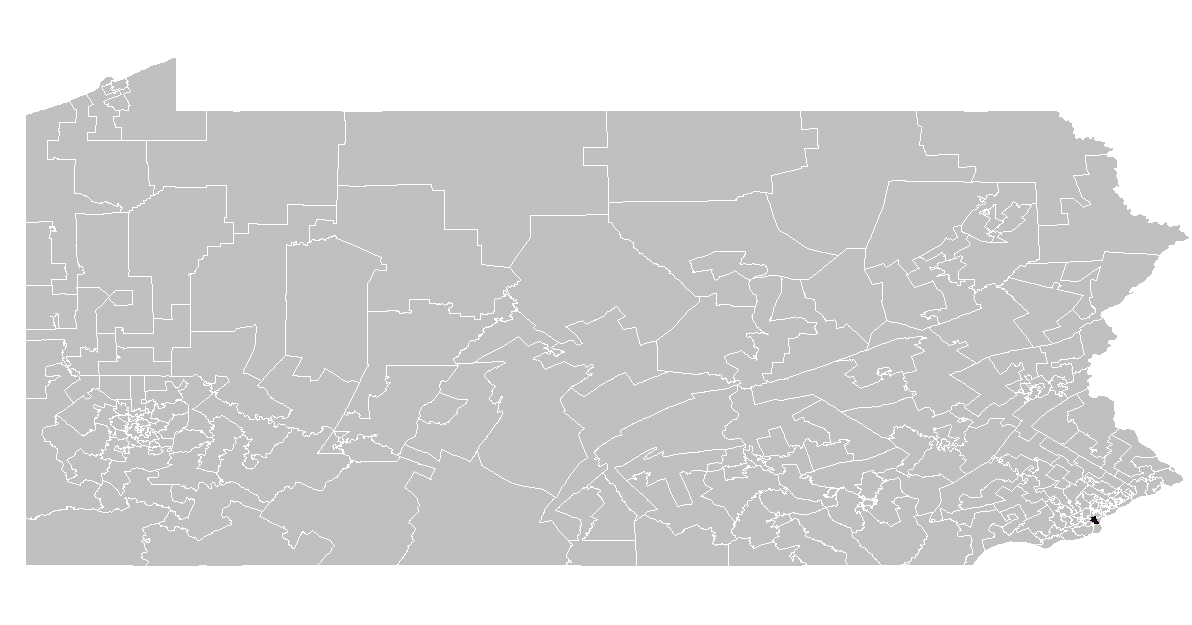
Representative
Ben Waxman; D–Philadelphia
- Demographics: 72.9% White; 1.0% Black; 0.6% Hispanic
- Population (2011) • Citizens of voting age: 60,646; 56,092

The 182nd Pennsylvania House of Representatives District is located in Philadelphia and has been represented since 2023 by Ben Waxman.

== District profile ==
The 182nd Pennsylvania House of Representatives District is located in Philadelphia County and encompasses the One Liberty Observation Deck and the Pennsylvania Academy of the Fine Arts. It also includes the following areas:

- Ward 02 [PART, Divisions 02, 03, 04, 05, 06, 07, 08, 09, 10, 11, 12, 13, 14, 17, 18, 19, 20, 21, 22, 23 and 24]
- Ward 05 [PART, Divisions 06, 07, 08, 09, 11, 14, 22, 28 and 29]
- Ward 08

Representative	Party	Years	District home	Note
Prior to 1969, seats were apportioned by county.
Louis Silverman	Democrat	1969 – 1970		
Samuel Rappaport	Democratic	1971 – 1984		
Babette Josephs	Democratic	1985 – 2012		
Brian Sims	Democratic	2013 – 2023		
Ben Waxman	Democratic	2023 – present		Incumbent

== Recent election results ==
=== 2010 ===
PA House election, 2010: Pennsylvania House, District 182
Party	Candidate	Votes	%
Democratic	Babette Josephs	Unopposed	
Total votes		17,984	100.00
Democratic hold			

=== 2012 ===
PA House election, 2012: Pennsylvania House, District 182
Party	Candidate	Votes	%
Democratic	Brian Sims	Unopposed	
Total votes		28,537	100.00
Democratic hold			

=== 2014 ===
PA House election, 2014: Pennsylvania House, District 182
Party	Candidate	Votes	%
Democratic	Brian Sims	Unopposed	
Total votes		15,808	100.00
Democratic hold			

=== 2016 ===
PA House election, 2016: Pennsylvania House, District 182
Party	Candidate	Votes	%
Democratic	Brian Sims	Unopposed	
Total votes		31,733	100.00
Democratic hold			

=== 2018 ===
PA House election, 2018: Pennsylvania House, District 182
Party	Candidate	Votes	%
Democratic	Brian Sims	28,234	90.56
Independent	James McDevitt	2,943	9.44
Total votes		31,177	100.00
Democratic hold			

=== 2020 ===
PA House election, 2020: Pennsylvania House, District 182
Party	Candidate	Votes	%
Democratic	Brian Sims	34,225	83.08
Republican	Andrew Murray	6,969	16.92
Total votes		41,194	100.00
Democratic hold			
