= Louis Silverman =

American politician

Member of the Pennsylvania House of Representatives from the 182nd district
- In office January 7, 1969 – November 30, 1970
- Preceded by: District Created
- Succeeded by: Samuel Rappaport

Member of the Pennsylvania House of Representatives from the Philadelphia County district
- In office January 2, 1957 – November 30, 1968

Personal details
- Born: February 28, 1909 Philadelphia, Pennsylvania
- Died: August 20, 1992 (aged 83) Philadelphia, Pennsylvania
- Party: Democratic

Louis Silverman (February 28, 1909 – August 20, 1992) was a Democratic member of the Pennsylvania House of Representatives.
