= Longburgh =

Hamlet in Cumbria, England

Coordinates: 54.920°N 3.080°W

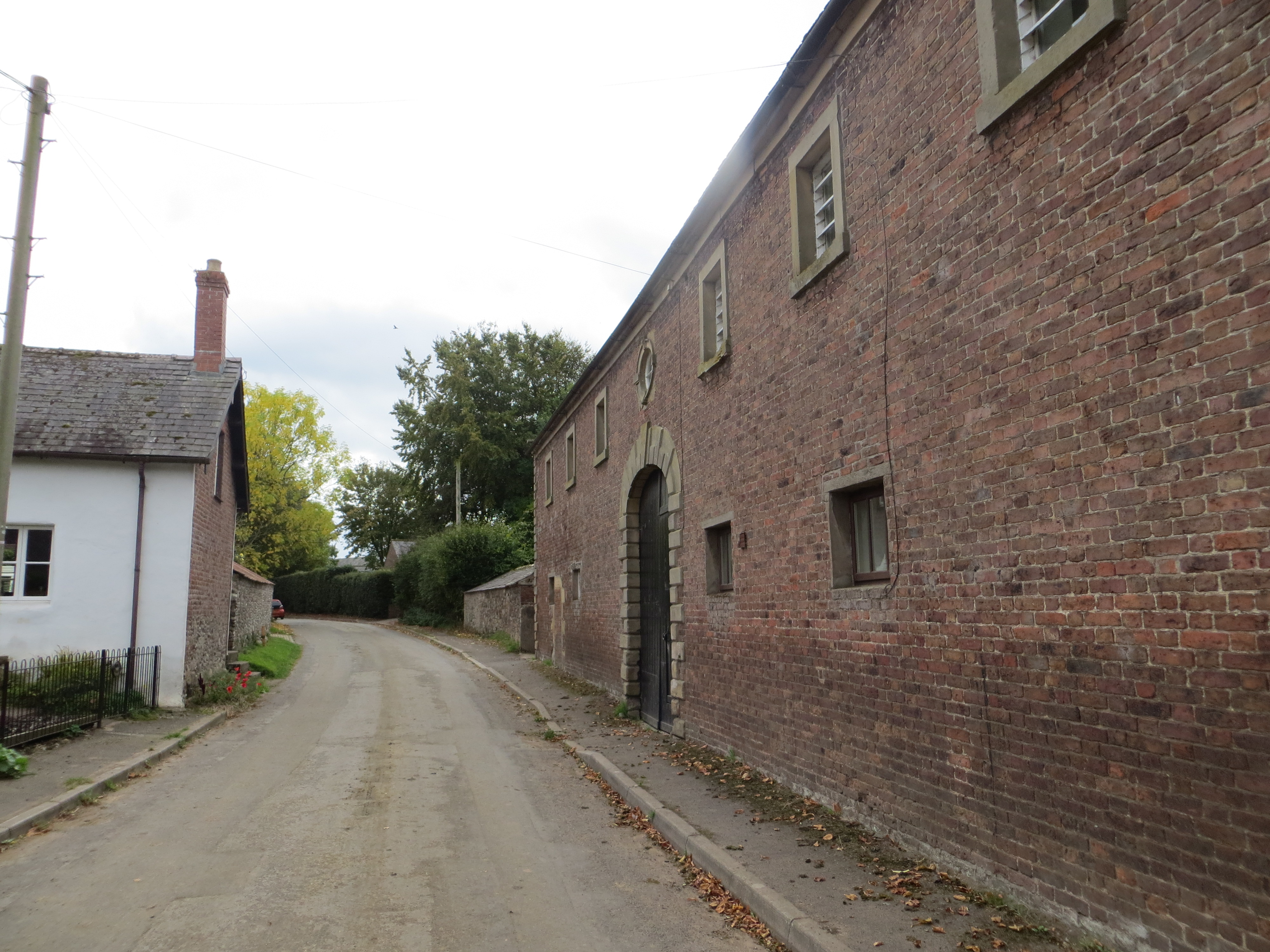
- Road through Longburgh

- Location in the former Carlisle district, Cumbria Location within Cumbria
- OS grid reference: NY307589
- Civil parish: Burgh by Sands
- Unitary authority: Cumberland
- Ceremonial county: Cumbria
- Region: North West
- Country: England
- Sovereign state: United Kingdom
- Post town: CARLISLE
- Postcode district: CA5
- Dialling code: 01228
- Police: Cumbria
- Fire: Cumbria
- Ambulance: North West
- UK Parliament: Carlisle

Longburgh is a hamlet in the civil parish of Burgh by Sands, in the Cumberland District, in the English county of Cumbria. Nearby settlements include the village of Burgh by Sands and the hamlet of Dykesfield. In 1870-72 the township had a population of 146.

== See also ==
- Listed buildings in Burgh by Sands
