= Newberg (surname) =

Newberg is a surname. Notable people with the surname include:

- Andrew B. Newberg, neurotheologist
- Esther Newberg, literary agent
- Heidi Jo Newberg, astrophysicist
- Herbert B. Newberg, class action lawyer
- J. Chris Newberg, comedian at Mark Ridley's Comedy Castle
- Jamey Newberg, baseball commentator
- Randy Newberg, a host of On Your Own Adventures
- William C. Newberg, an American automotive executive
