= North End, Cumbria =

Part of the village of Burgh by Sands, Cumbria, England

Coordinates: 54.92439°N 3.05066°W

North End is the northernmost part of the village of Burgh by Sands in the Cumberland district of Cumbria, England.
