= Newborough =

Newborough may refer to:

== Places ==
- Newborough, Anglesey (Niwbwrch), a town in Wales
- Newborough, Cambridgeshire, a village in England
- Newborough, Staffordshire, England
- Newborough, Victoria, a town in the Latrobe Valley of Australia

== People ==
- Baron Newborough
- Rachel Newborough (born 1996), Northern Irish footballer

== See also ==
- Newberg (disambiguation)
- Newburg (disambiguation)
- Newburgh (disambiguation)
