= Moorhouse, Cumbria =

Village near Carlisle, Cumbria, England

Coordinates: 54.901°N 3.042°W

Moorhouse
- Village
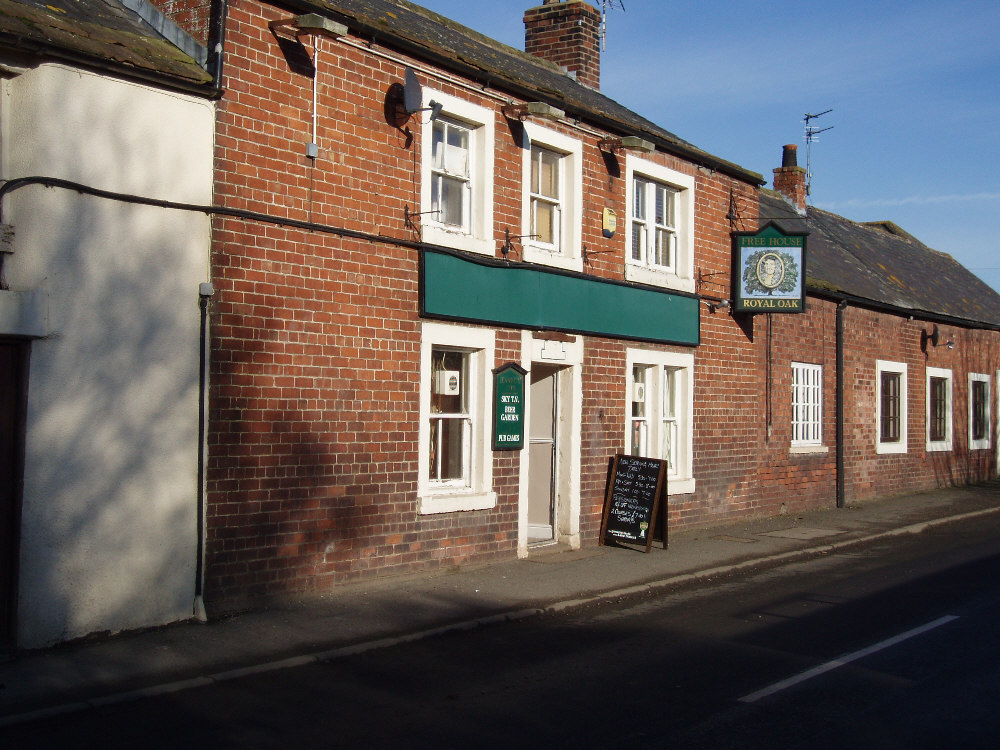
- The Royal Oak public house, Moorhouse

- Location in the former Carlisle district, Cumbria Location within Cumbria
- OS grid reference: NY331567
- Civil parish: Burgh by Sands
- Unitary authority: Cumberland
- Ceremonial county: Cumbria
- Region: North West
- Country: England
- Sovereign state: United Kingdom
- Post town: CARLISLE
- Postcode district: CA5
- Dialling code: 01228
- Police: Cumbria
- Fire: Cumbria
- Ambulance: North West
- UK Parliament: Carlisle

Moorhouse is a village on the B5307 road in the civil parish of Burgh by Sands in the English county of Cumbria. It is near the city of Carlisle. In 1870–72 the township had a population of 306. It has a pub called 'The Royal Oak Inn'.

== See also ==
- Listed buildings in Burgh by Sands
