= Listed buildings in Burgh by Sands =

Burgh by Sands is a civil parish in the Cumberland district in Cumbria, England. It contains 55 listed buildings that are recorded in the National Heritage List for England. Of these, one is listed at Grade I, the highest of the three grades, three are at Grade II*, the middle grade, and the others are at Grade II, the lowest grade. The parish contains the villages of Burgh by Sands, Longburgh, Dykesfield, Boustead Hill, Moorhouse and Thurstonfield, and the surrounding countryside. A feature of the parish it that some of the oldest surviving houses and farm buildings were built in clay (the houses are known as "dabbins" or "daubins"), and many of them are listed. During the 19th century the Carlisle Canal was built through the parish and, when this closed, its line was converted into the Port Carlisle Dock and Railway. Three surviving bridges and an aqueduct surviving from this are listed. Most of the other listed buildings are houses and associated structures, and farmhouses and farm buildings. In addition, the listed buildings include a church, a former Friends' meeting house, a monument, and a public house.

== Key ==
Grade	Criteria
I	Buildings of exceptional interest, sometimes considered to be internationally important
II*	Particularly important buildings of more than special interest
II	Buildings of national importance and special interest

== Buildings ==
Name and location	Photograph	Date	Notes	Grade
St Michael's Church; 54.92213°N 3.04887°W		Late 12th century (probable)	The north aisle was added in about 1200, and in the 14th century towers were added at the east and the west, the east tower being reduced in height probably in 1713. The church is built in Roman red sandstone and calciferous sandstone and has green slate roof. It consists of a nave with a clerestory, a north aisle, a chancel, the east tower used as a vestry, and a west tower. The east tower has two stages and the west has three. The walls of the west tower are extremely thick and contain a staircase within them; there are also arrow slits and a battlemented parapet. The north doorway is Norman in style and the rest of the church is Early English.	I
Cross Farm and barns 54.92234°N 3.05126°W		16th century	A farmhouse, barns and outbuilding forming three sides of a farmyard. The house is in rendered clay with a brick end wall and a Welsh slate roof. It has two storeys and three bays. The doorway has an architrave and a moulded cornice, the windows in the ground floor are sashes, and in the upper floor they are horizontally sliding sashes. The barn is in clay with a corrugated asbestos roof, it has a single storey and four bays. There is a large cart entrance, and inside are four pairs of full crucks. The outbuilding dates from the 19th century, it is in mixed cobbles and sandstone with quoins, and a roof partly of green slate and partly of asbestos. It has two storeys, numerous bays, and a large cart entrance. Incorporated into its wall is a Roman inscribed stone altar.	II
Lamonby Farmhouse and barn 54.92238°N 3.05355°W		c. 1615	Originally a longhouse, with a farmhouse, a cottage to the right and a barn to the left, all in a single row. The farmhouse has three bays, the cottage two, and the barn five. They are built in clay, with full crucks, the walls tapering as they rise. The roof of the farmhouse and cottage is thatched, and the roof of the barn is in corrugated iron. The building has one storey and an attic, and the windows are sashes. In the barn is a cart entrance.	II*
Leigh Cottage; 54.92457°N 3.05032°W		Mid 17th century or earlier	The cottage, which was extended in the 19th century, is built in clay, now rendered, and has a corrugated sheet roof. There is one storey and an attic, the original part has two bays, and at the east end is a one-bay extension and a rear offshut. There is one sash window and other smaller windows. The cottage is of cruck construction, the crucks being set high on the walls.	II
Burgh House, Fulwood House and barn 54.92217°N 3.05511°W	—	1769	Originally one house and a barn, later two dwellings. They are rendered on a chamfered plinth, with quoins, a moulded cornice, and a hipped green slate roof. The outer bays have moulded triangular pediments, and both houses are in two storeys. Fulwood House has four bays, a rear three-bay outbuilding (formerly a barn), and a prostyle Ionic porch. Burgh House has five bays, and a round-arched doorway that has a radial fanlight with a pilastered surround and moulded impost blocks. Both parts have sash windows in architraves.	II
Brewery Farm; 54.92074°N 3.07877°W	—	Late 17th century	A farmhouse, later a private house, that was raised in height in the early 19th century. Originally built in clay with a single storey and a loft, it was raised in height in brick to form two storeys. It has a Welsh slate roof and has four bays. The door has a wooden architrave, and the sash windows have plain surrounds. Inside the house are four pairs of full crucks.	II
Hall Farm; 54.90137°N 3.04252°W	—	Late 17th century	The farmhouse is in rendered clay, and has a roof of Welsh slate with some sandstone slate. There are two storeys and seven bays. The doors and windows have stone surrounds. Most of the windows are casements, with two horizontally sliding sash windows.	II
The Hill; 54.91939°N 3.06580°W	—	Late 17th century	Originally three houses, it was extended in the late 18th century and is now one dwelling. It is rendered, on the left side over clay, and on the right side over cobbles. The roof of the older part is in Welsh slates and sandstone slate, and the later part in green slate. There are two storeys, and four bays. The windows are sashes in plain surrounds. Inside the house is a pair of full crucks.	II
Longburgh Farm and barn 54.92025°N 3.07958°W	—	Late 17th century	The farmhouse and adjoining barn have green slate roofs and are in two storeys. The house is built in clay and has six bays. The doorway has an architrave and a moulded triangular pediment, and the windows are horizontally sliding sashes. The barn to the right is dated 1727, it is in brick with stone dressings and has eight bays. In the upper floor are sash windows with segmental heads and a loft door.	II
Moorhouse Farmhouse and stables 54.90143°N 3.04664°W	—	Late 17th century (probable)	The farmhouse is rendered, probably partly over clay, and has a Welsh slate roof. There are two storeys, five bays, and doors in stone surrounds. The windows are sashes, those in the upper floor in gabled dormers. The stables are at right angles to the left, they are in cobble, and have a large cart entrance with a sandstone surround, and a loft opening above.	II
Barn, Moorhouse Farm; 54.90164°N 3.04667°W	—	Late 17th century	The barn is built in clay with repairs in brick and cobbles. It has a roof of Welsh slate with some sandstone slate. The barn has a single storey and inside contains ten pairs of full crucks. The openings include a large cart entrance with a brick surround, entrances with rebated calciferous sandstone surrounds, and two loft entrances with wooden surrounds.	II*
North End Cottage; 54.92434°N 3.05040°W		Late 17th century	A cottage and a former barn, the latter dating from the 18th century. The cottage is in rendered clay on projecting plinth stones, and there is a thatched roof. It has one storey, four bays, a door in a wooden surround, sash windows, and two buttresses. Internally it is of cruck construction. The barn to the left has two storeys, two bays, a door in a stone surround, casement windows, a blocked doorway, and a loft door.	II
Orchard House; 54.90117°N 3.04001°W	—	Late 17th century	A farmhouse that was extended in the early 19th century. It is stuccoed, partly over clay, and has a green slate roof. There are two storeys, the original part has two bays and the extension, which is lower, has three. The windows are sashes, those in the original part having architraves.	II
White Cottage; 54.91998°N 3.08027°W	—	Late 17th century	Originally two houses, later combined into one, it is in rendered clay with projecting granite plinth stones, a wall to the right is in brick on cobbles, and the roof is in Welsh slate with some sandstone slate. The part to the left has two storeys and two bays, the part to the right has one storey and four bays. The doorway has a wooden architrave, and the windows are small casements. Inside the right part is a pair of upper crucks and an inglenook.	II
King Edward I Monument; 54.93840°N 3.05401°W		1685	The monument was rebuilt in 1803 following a collapse, and was restored and fenced in 1876. It is in red sandstone and consists of a square pillar about 20 feet (6.1 m) high. It has a moulded plinth, a moulded cornice, and a shaped cap which is surmounted by a cross. There are inscriptions on the sides.	II*
Old Vicarage; 54.92230°N 3.04851°W		c. 1685	The vicarage was extended in about 1734, and alterations were made later. It has two storeys, and roofs of green slate. The original part is in clay on large plinth stones, and is in two bays. On the road side are a casement window with an oriel sash window above. Inside this part are two pairs of full crucks. The extension is higher, with two bays, and sash windows on the road side. On the side facing the churchyard are cast iron casements with intersecting tracery in false moulded arches. At the rear is an outshut with a 20th-century porch, door and windows.	II
Burial ground wall, Friends' Meeting House; 54.90104°N 3.03720°W	—	1694	The wall surrounds a Quaker burial ground and is rectangular in plan. It is built in brick on a cobble foundation and has a rounded sandstone coping. Parts of the wall have collapsed, and by the entrance is a collapsed dated lintel.	II
Buck Bottom and barn 54.92225°N 3.05191°W	—	Late 17th or early 18th century	A farmhouse and barn, the farmhouse being extended in the early 19th century. The original house is in rendered clay with a Welsh slate roof, and the extension is in brick on a chamfered stone plinth. The original part has two storeys and three bays, and the extension has one storey and two bays. The windows are casements. In the extension is a round-headed doorway that has a fanlight with a reeded pilaster surround, moulded impost blocks, and a keystone. The barn is in clay on projecting plinth stones, with repairs on brick and cobbles. It has one storey, seven bays, sash windows, ventilation slits, and a plank door. Inside are seven pairs of full crucks.	II
Stonehouse and outbuilding 54.90146°N 3.04496°W		1703	The house was extended in 1760, it is in limestone on a sandstone plinth, with quoins, an end wall in brick, and a roof mainly of Welsh slate and some sandstone slate. There are two storeys, the main part has three bays, and the extension has two. In the main part are casement windows and some blocked windows; in the extension is a segmental-arched doorway with a quoined surround, an entablature with a keystone, and a moulded cornice, and the windows are sashes in architraves. The outbuilding to the right, originally a barn, is built in clay, it has a roof of sandstone slate, and contains a carriage door.	II
Fauld Farm and outbuilding 54.92187°N 3.05655°W	—	1725	A farmhouse and former barn in rendered clay with a green slate roof. There are two storeys, the farmhouse has four bays, the former barn has two, and on the front of the barn is a single-storey lean-to extension. The doorway has a stone surround and an inscribed and dated lintel, and the windows are sashes in stone surrounds. In the barn is a door and a left door, both in stone surrounds.	II
Longburgh Farmhouse; 54.92051°N 3.07805°W	—	Early 18th century	The farmhouse was extended in the late 18th century. The earlier part is in brick with a Welsh slate roof. This was partly demolished for the addition of the later part, which is stuccoed with quoins and green slate roof. There are two storeys, the original part has two bays and the later part has five. In the earlier part is a porch and a mullioned window, and the later part has a round-headed doorway that has a fanlight with a pilastered surround and intersecting tracery, impost blocks and a keystone. The other windows in both parts are sashes.	II
Former Friends' Meeting House; 54.90024°N 3.03738°W		1733	The building is in brick on a chamfered stone plinth, and has a green slate roof with coped gables. There are 1 1/2 storeys and six bays. The double doors are in a moulded round arch with impost blocks and a false dated keystone. The windows have plain surrounds.	II
Low Moorhouse; 54.89967°N 3.03901°W	—	1734	A brick house with quoins, and a Welsh slate roof with coped gables. There are two storeys and four bays, The doorway has a moulded architrave, a dated and inscribed keystone, and a moulded cornice. The sash windows are also in moulded architraves.	II
Cruck Cottage; 54.90177°N 3.04617°W	—	18th century (probable)	The former cottage has rendered clay walls on large projecting plinth stones, it has been repaired with cobbles and brick, and has a roof of Welsh slate with some sandstone slate. There is one storey, three bays, a plank door in a wooden surround and a steel casement window. Inside are two pairs of full crucks.	II
Boundary wall, Friends' Meeting House; 54.90053°N 3.03750°W	—	Mid 18th century	The wall to the north of the meeting house is in mixed cobbles, sandstone rubble, and brick, with sandstone dressings. It is a low wall with chamfered coping, and has a serpentine shape each side of the gateway. There are stone gate posts and a farm gate.	II
Barn, Stonehouse; 54.90160°N 3.04532°W	—	18th century	The barn is built in clay on a massive boulder foundation, and has quoins and a Welsh slate roof. The front facing the road is faced with cobbles, and the sides and rear are rendered with some brick. On the street elevation are three partly blocked doorways, and at the rear are offshuts and varied doorways.	II
The Beeches and barn 54.89980°N 3.06871°W		1756	A farmhouse and barn in brick on a chamfered plinth, with calciferous sandstone quoins. The house has a green slate roof with coped gables, and the barn has a roof of sandstone slates. There are two storeys, the house has four bays and the barn has two. The house has a doorway with a stone architrave, an entablature with a keystone, and a dated and inscribed moulded cornice. The windows are sashes in stone architraves. Part of the barn has been incorporated into the house.	II
Rose Mount; 54.92268°N 3.05200°W	—	Mid or late 18th century	A brick house with a roof of Welsh slate and sandstone slate. It has two storeys and three bays. The doorway has a moulded architrave and a cornice. The windows are sashes in architraves. At the rear is an extension in cobbles that incorporates part of a former clay house.	II
Wormanby Farmhouse; 54.92005°N 3.03779°W		1772	The farmhouse is stuccoed on a chamfered plinth, and has quoins and a green slate roof with coped gables. There are two storeys and four bays, with a single-bay extension to the left. The doorway has a bolection surround, a dated and inscribed frieze, and a moulded cornice. The windows are sashes in architraves.	II
Brewery Cottage; 54.92026°N 3.08007°W	—	Late 18th century	The cottage and attached barn are in cobbles with a slate roof, and both have two storeys and two bays. Beyond the barn is a single-storey single-bay extension. The house has quoins, and a doorway that has a fanlight with a pilastered surround and a triangular pediment. Most of the windows are sashes, above the door is an octagonal casement window, and there are also blocked windows. The barn to the right has doors and loft openings.	II
Garden wall, Burgh House and Fulwood House; 54.92202°N 3.05497°W	—	Late 18th century	The wall is in brick with rounded sandstone coping on a chamfered stone plinth, and has serpentine curves to both entrances. There are two pairs of gate piers. These are square and rusticated and they have moulded caps and ball finials.	II
Dykesfield; 54.92281°N 3.08114°W		Late 18th century	The house was extended in the mid 19th century. It is stuccoed with a green slate roof, there are two storeys, the original part has four bays, and the flanking extension are gabled with one bay. The original part has a parapet, a prostyle Doric porch with an ogee-shaped pediment and urn finials, and sash windows in architraves. The extensions have bargeboards and sash windows in plain surrounds.	II
Fairfield; 54.90132°N 3.04170°W	—	Late 18th century	A rendered house with a green slate roof. It has two storeys and three bays, with a single-storey two-bay extension to the left, and a single-bay extension to the right. The doorway and the windows, which are sashes, have plain stone surrounds.	II
Greyhound Inn; 54.92155°N 3.05649°W		Late 18th century	Originally a house, later a public house, it is stuccoed on a chamfered plinth, with quoins and a Welsh slate roof with coped gables. There are two storeys and three bays. The doorway has a moulded surround, and a round arched head with a keystone and impost blocks. The windows are casements in architraves.	II
Highfield; 54.92224°N 3.10120°W	—	Late 18th century	A brick farmhouse with quoins and a green slate roof. There are two storeys and three bays. The door has a pilastered surround with panelled reveals, impost blocks, and a keystone. The windows are sashes with flat brick arches and keystones.	II
The Hollies; 54.89986°N 3.06819°W	—	Late 18th century	A brick farmhouse on a chamfered stone plinth, with quoins and a cornice, and a Welsh slate roof with coped gables. There are two storeys and two bays. The doorway has an architrave and a moulded cornice, and the windows are sashes in architraves.	II
Wall, Longburgh House; 54.92036°N 3.08065°W		Late 18th century (probable)	The wall runs along the garden of the house. It is a low wall in cobbles with rounded coping. On the corner is a pair of gate piers. These are in rusticated ashlar, and each has a dentilled cornice and an urn finial.	II
Midtown Farmhouse; 54.92224°N 3.05410°W	—	Late 18th century	A stuccoed farmhouse on a chamfered plinth, with quoins and a green slate roof with coped gables. There are two storeys, five bays, and a later single-bay extension to the left. On the front is a tetrastyle Doric porch, the outer columns square and the inner ones round. The door has sidelights, and the windows, which are sashes, are in architraves.	II
Moorhouse Hall; 54.90097°N 3.04382°W		Late 18th century	A stuccoed house on a chamfered plinth, with quoins, a string course, a moulded cornice, a parapet with a triangular pediment, and semicircular antefixae, and a green slate roof. It has two storeys and five bays. In the centre are double doors with a radial fanlight in a round arch with a false keystone, and sidelights with a pilastered strip surround. Above the doorway is a Venetian window with a French window and a wrought iron balcony. The windows are sashes in architraves with false keystones.	II
Tower, Fulwood House; 54.92245°N 3.05600°W		Late 18th century	Possibly a watchtower, it is in brick, and is partly rendered. It is square with three storeys and a battlemented parapet. The ground floor is open and has a segmental arch with impost blocks and a keystone. External steps lead up to a first floor doorway, and on this floor are sash windows. The top floor contains casement windows.	II
Wormanby House; 54.91988°N 3.03706°W	—	Late 18th century	A rendered house with a Welsh slate roof, in two storeys and four bays. The door and the sash windows have painted architraves.	II
Longburgh House and outbuildings 54.92007°N 3.08073°W	—	1782	The house and outbuildings form four sides of a farmyard. They are in brick with green slate roofs, and have two storeys. The house has quoins, a moulded string course and a hipped roof. Its entrance front has four recessed bays in the centre, flanked by gabled two-bay wings. In the central section are two round-headed doorways that have fanlights with intersecting tracery, pilastered surrounds with impost blocks, and false keystones. The windows are sashes in architraves. The barn has a quoined round arch with a dated and inscribed keystone, above which is an oculus. At the rear is another outbuilding with a projecting cart entrance and ventilation slits.	II
Farmhouse opposite Stonehouse; 54.90136°N 3.04523°W	—	Late 18th or early 19th century	The farmhouse is in brick with pale headers, and has quoins, a Welsh slate roof, and a pebbledashed extension. The main part has two storeys and two bays, and the extension to the left has one storey and three bays. In the main part are sash windows in architraves, and in the extension is a doorway with an architrave, and casement windows with plain surrounds.	II
Kokied Cottage; 54.89921°N 3.06749°W		Late 18th or early 19th century	A house and former stables in mixed cobbles and sandstone rubble masonry with calciferous sandstone quoins and dressings. It has a roof mainly of sandstone slate with some Welsh slate. There are two storeys, and the building has a U-shaped plan, formed by a three-bay front range, a three-bay wing at right anglers, and the former stable. The doorway and the windows, which are sashes, have plain stone surrounds.	II
Canal aqueduct 54.92515°N 3.11903°W	—	1819–23	The aqueduct was built to carry the Carlisle Canal over Grass Dike. In 1853 it was converted into a railway bridge for the Port Carlisle Dock and Railway Company. The aqueduct is in brick with red sandstone coping, and consists of two round arches. It has a serpentine curved parapet.	II
Boustead Hill Bridge; 54.92348°N 3.10182°W	—	1819–23	The bridge was built to carry a road over the Carlisle Canal, and when the canal closed it was raised in height in 1853–54 for the Port Carlisle Dock and Railway Company. It is in red sandstone and calciferous sandstone, and has a central cast iron parapet on wooden pillars.	II
Dykesfield Bridge; 54.92204°N 3.08176°W	—	1819–23	The bridge was built to carry a road over the Carlisle Canal, and when the canal closed it was raised in height in 1853–54 for the Port Carlisle Dock and Railway Company. It is in red sandstone and calciferous sandstone, and has a central cast iron parapet on wooden pillars.	II
West Green Bridge; 54.92031°N 3.06469°W		1819–23	The bridge was built to carry a road over the Carlisle Canal, and when the canal closed it was raised in height in 1853–54 for the Port Carlisle Dock and Railway Company. It is in red sandstone and calciferous sandstone, and has a central cast iron parapet on wooden pillars.	II
Barn and byres 54.90124°N 3.04497°W		Early 19th century	The farm buildings are in cobble with stone dressings and a hipped green slate roof. They contain two cart entrances with segmental arches, smaller doors with flat arches, loft doors, casement windows, and ventilation slits.	II
Boustead Hill House; 54.92100°N 3.10583°W	—	Early 19th century	A stuccoed house on a chamfered plinth with a green slate roof. It has two storeys and four bays that are flanked by single-storey, single-bay wings. There is a prostyle Tuscan porch with fluted columns, a triglyph frieze, and a cornice, and above the door is a fanlight. The windows are sashes, some in architraves.	II
Burgh Head House; 54.92198°N 3.05030°W	—	Early 19th century	The house is in two storeys with a green slate roof, and was extended later in the 19th century. The original part is rendered on a stone plinth, with three bays, a doorway that has a fanlight in a pilastered surround with a moulded cornice, and sash windows with stone sills. The extension to the right is in brick with three bays. In the ground floor are cross-mullioned windows containing casements with cast iron patterns and hood moulds. In the upper floor are gabled dormers with similar windows and with decorated bargeboards.	II
Croft House and stables 54.92137°N 3.10499°W	—	Early 19th century	The house, with stables to the left, have green slate roofs. The house is in chequered brick on a chamfered stone plinth, with quoins and a green slate roof. It has two storeys and three bays. The round-arched doorway has a fanlight in a pilastered surround with imposts and a keystone. The windows are sashes in plain surrounds. The stables, also in brick, have two storeys, two bays, plank doors, and a loft door.	II
Hillside Farmhouse; 54.92203°N 3.10277°W	—	Early 19th century	The farmhouse is in brick, with pale headers, on a chamfered stone plinth, and has eaves modillions and a green slate roof. There are two storeys and three bays, flanked by two-storey single-bay extensions. The porch has engaged Roman Doric fluted columns, a triglyph frieze and a cornice, and the windows are sashes.	II
South View; 54.90022°N 3.07134°W	—	Early 19th century	A former farmhouse in sandstone with quoins and a green slate roof. It has two storeys and three bays. The doorway and the windows, which are casements, have plain stone surrounds.	II
West End; 54.92148°N 3.0644°W	West End, Burgh by Sands	Early 19th century	A stuccoed house on a chamfered plinth with quoins and a slate roof. There are two storeys and three bays, with a recessed two-storey two-bay extension to the left. The round-headed doorway has a fanlight with a pilastered surround and a false keystone. The windows are sashes in architraves.	II
