= Burgh by Sands =

Coordinates: 54.923°N 3.050°W

- Village and parish
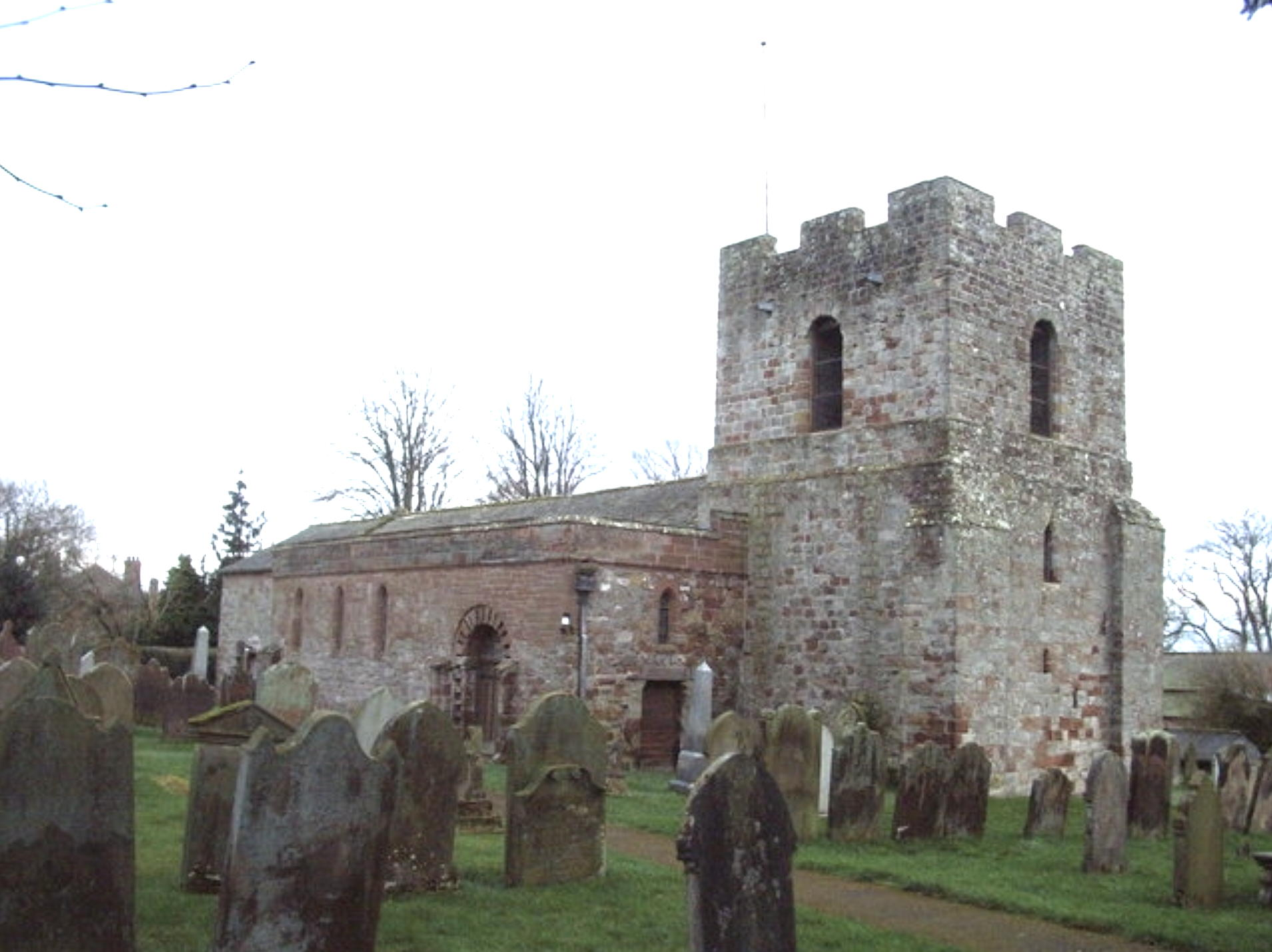
- St. Michael's Church, Burgh by Sands

- Location within Cumbria
- Population: 1,242 (2021)
- OS grid reference: NY326592
- Civil parish: Burgh by Sands
- Unitary authority: Cumberland
- Ceremonial county: Cumbria
- Region: North West
- Country: England
- Sovereign state: United Kingdom
- Post town: CARLISLE
- Postcode district: CA5
- Dialling code: 01228
- Police: Cumbria
- Fire: Cumbria
- Ambulance: North West
- UK Parliament: Carlisle

Burgh by Sands (/ˈbrʌf/) is a village and civil parish in the Cumberland unitary authority area of Cumbria, England, situated near the Solway Firth. The parish includes the village of Burgh by Sands along with Longburgh, Dykesfield, Boustead Hill, Moorhouse and Thurstonfield. It is notable as the site of the first recorded North African (Mauri) military unit in Roman Britain, garrisoning the frontier fort of Aballava on Hadrian's Wall in the 3rd century AD. It is also where Edward I of England died in 1307.

According to the 2021 census the parish had a population of 1,242. The village is about seven miles (11 km) west of Carlisle city centre. The village has a primary school, a pub and a post office. It also has a statue of Edward I at some distance to the north. Burgh was on the Carlisle Navigation canal from 1823 to 1853, after which it was served by the Port Carlisle railway, which was built on the bed of the canal, until its closure in 1932. From 1856 to 1964, railway trains operating on the Carlisle to Silloth line once again stopped at Burgh-by-Sands station.

== Toponymy ==
Burgh is named from the 'burh' or fort on Hadrian's Wall, which passed through here and ended at Bowness-on-Solway to the west. ('Burh' is Old English for 'fortified place', 'town' or 'manor house').

== History ==
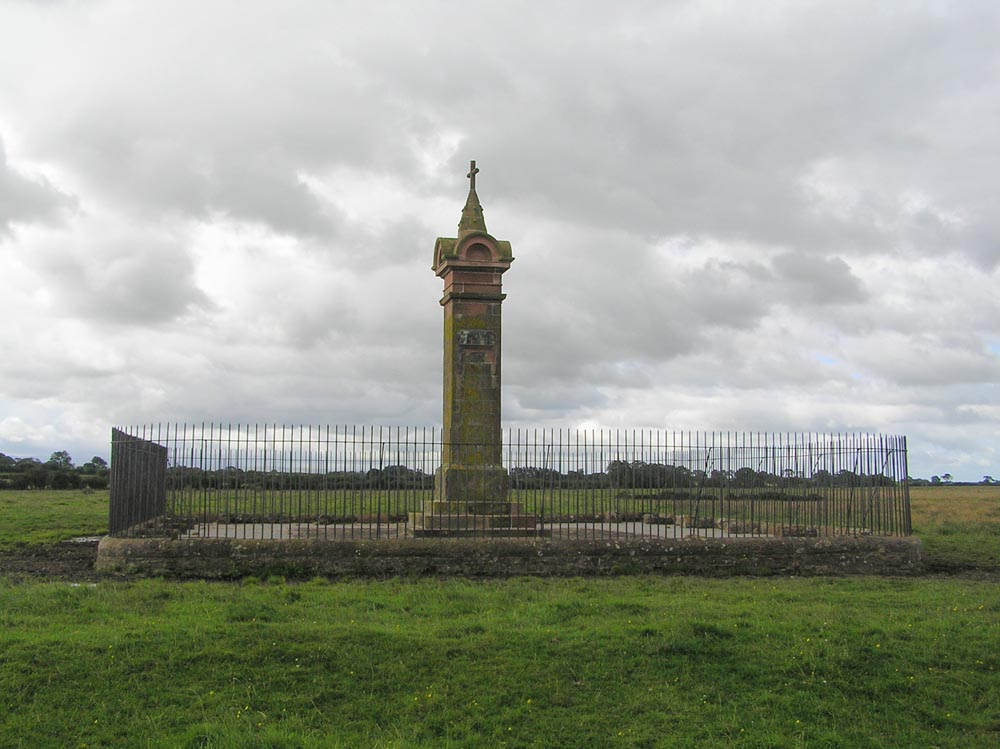
Edward I monument on the Burgh marshes

The line of Hadrian's Wall runs through the village, and the site once was that of a major Roman fort, Aballava. It is also the death-place of King Edward I of England.

In the 12th century, Burgh by Sands Castle and lands of Burgh by Sands belonged to members of the Feudal barony of Burgh by Sands, among them Ada de Engaine. Her granddaughter's second marriage founded a younger branch of the Moulton family, a branch of which held this castle in the 13th century. In the 14th century the Dacre family inherited it by marriage to the heiress.

King Edward I, while on his way to war against the Scots, died of dysentery on the marshes near Burgh, and his corpse lay in state at the village's 12th-century church until its eventual removal to Westminster Abbey. There is an impressive monument on the marshes erected in 1685 to mark the place where he died. It is 1 1/4 miles NNW of the village, is signposted and can be reached on foot.

== St Michael's Church ==
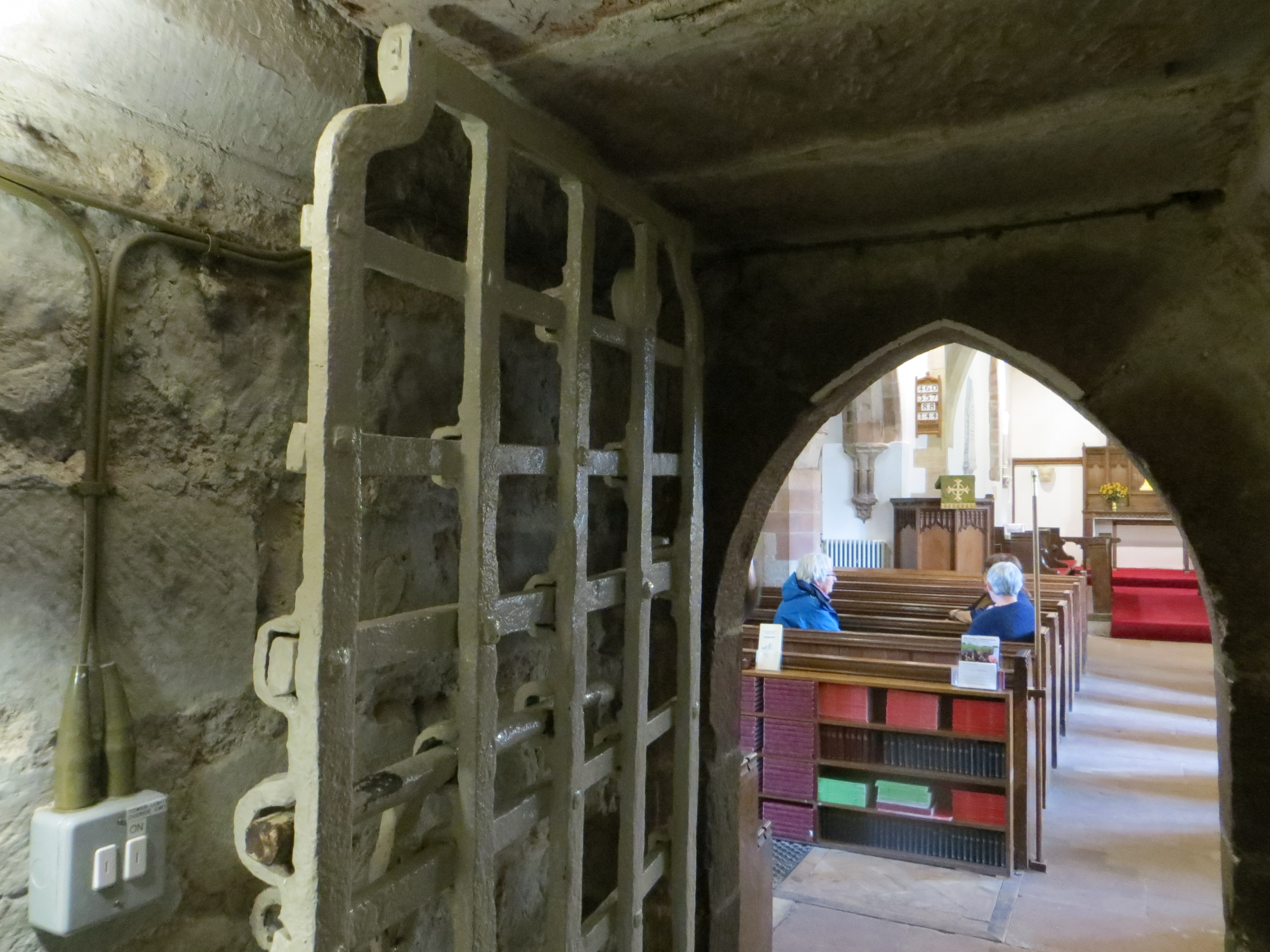
Yett between church and tower

The Church of St Michael, is a fortified church built with stone from the Roman wall on the site of a Norman church. It has a broad west tower with a base dating from the mid-14th century (first built in 1360) and apart from the 19th-century north aisle windows, the rest is Early English. The tower, which can only be accessed from within the church, is designed for defence and the ground floor is tunnel-vaulted. The top of the tower is probably 18th century. The internal door to the tower is a yett, a fortified iron door to repel invaders. The church is remarkable for having had two defensive towers, one at each end, a measure of the perceived threat from Scottish raiders. The east tower is now used as the vestry, but to this day the church has no east window. More recently the east tower has been lowered to match the roof of the church, so from outside it is not immediately recognisable as a tower.

== Governance ==
The parish falls in the electoral ward of Burgh. This wards stretches beyond the boundaries of Burgh by Sands with a total population taken at the 2011 Census of 2,117.

== Transport ==
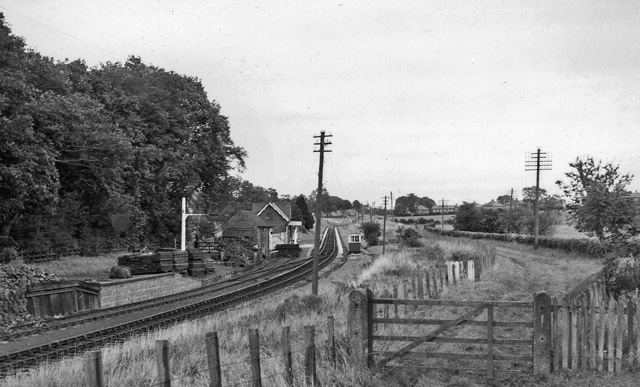
At one time Burgh-by-Sands had a station on the North British Railway

Public transport currently consists of a bus service from Carlisle. As of September 2018, it is run four times daily by Stagecoach.

== See also ==
- Drumburgh
- List of English and Welsh endowed schools (19th century)
- Listed buildings in Burgh by Sands
- North End, Cumbria
