= Herbert B. Newberg =

American class-action attorney (1937–1992)

- Born: Herbert Barkan Newberg; July 18, 1937; Philadelphia, Pennsylvania, U.S.
- Died: June 6, 1992 (aged 54); Albany, New York, U.S.
- Education: Bachelor of Science, Wharton School, 1958; Juris Doctor, Harvard Law, 1961
- Occupation: Attorney at law
- Known for: Expertise in class-action lawsuits
- Spouse: Babette Josephs (m. 1962)

Herbert Barkan Newberg (1937–1992), an American attorney, was considered one of the leading class action experts in the country. He wrote the multivolume series, Newberg on Class Actions, and was named a "Legend of the Bar" by the Philadelphia Bar association.

== Early life and education ==
Herbert Newberg, the son of Samuel A. and Lillian (Barkan) Newberg, was born July 18, 1937, in Philadelphia, Pennsylvania, U.S. He earned a Bachelor of Science summa cum laude at the Wharton School of the University of Pennsylvania in 1958, and Juris Doctor at Harvard Law School in 1961.

Newberg wed Babette Josephs in 1962. Married for three decades, they had two children, a son and a daughter.

== Career ==
Newberg's first position was as Assistant city solicitor for Philadelphia, from 1962 to 1964. He held partnerships in several Philadelphia law firms during the next thirty years, and presented cases before the United States District Court (eastern district) of Pennsylvania, the United States Court Appeals (3d circuit), the Supreme Court of the United States, the U.S. 2nd District Court of Appeals, and District of Columbia circuits.

Kurt Heine of the Philadelphia Daily News wrote,

His growing fame in the field of class-action litigation made him a courtroom star. Lawyers across the country sought his testimony in class-action cases on matters ranging from civil rights and welfare to employment discrimination. People who had been wronged sought him as their lawyer. He represented thousands of women suffering health problems from the Dalkon Shield intra-uterine device, was working on behalf of about 35,000 operators of schools against asbestos manufacturers and helped force the cleanup of the Exxon Valdez oil spill in Alaska.

Newberg argued class action suits on radiation poisoning from the atomic bomb and asbestos in schools. He also volunteered for groups dedicated to safety on the streets, world peace and nuclear disarmament.

Newberg died of a heart attack at age 54.

== Selected publications ==
- Newberg, Herbert B. (1985). Newberg on Class Actions (6 Volume Set) (2nd ed.). Shepard's/McGraw-Hill. ISBN 978-0070463547.
- Newberg, Herbert (1977). Newberg on class actions: A manual for group litigation at federal and state levels. Shepard's Citations. ISBN 978-0070463356. According to the Yale Library listing, "This multi-volume treatise is considered a premier work on the law and conduct of class actions. It discusses the theory and fundamental characteristics of the class action, examining benefits, controversies, and judicial remedy."
- Newberg, H. B.; Conte, A. (1993). Attorney Fee Awards (2nd ed.). McGraw-Hill Companies. ISBN 978-0071725040.
- Newberg, Herbert B. (1971–1972). "Building Local Citizen Alliances to Reduce Crime and Create a Fairer and More Effective Criminal Justice System". Journal of Urban Law. 49: 443.

== Awards, honors ==
- "Legend of the Bar", Philadelphia Bar Association: He "developed a class action law practice and obtained a national reputation as one of the leading class action experts in the country. He authored the book Newberg on Class Actions, which remains the bible in the class action field."
