= Dykesfield =

Hamlet in Cumbria, England

Coordinates: 54.922°N 3.081°W

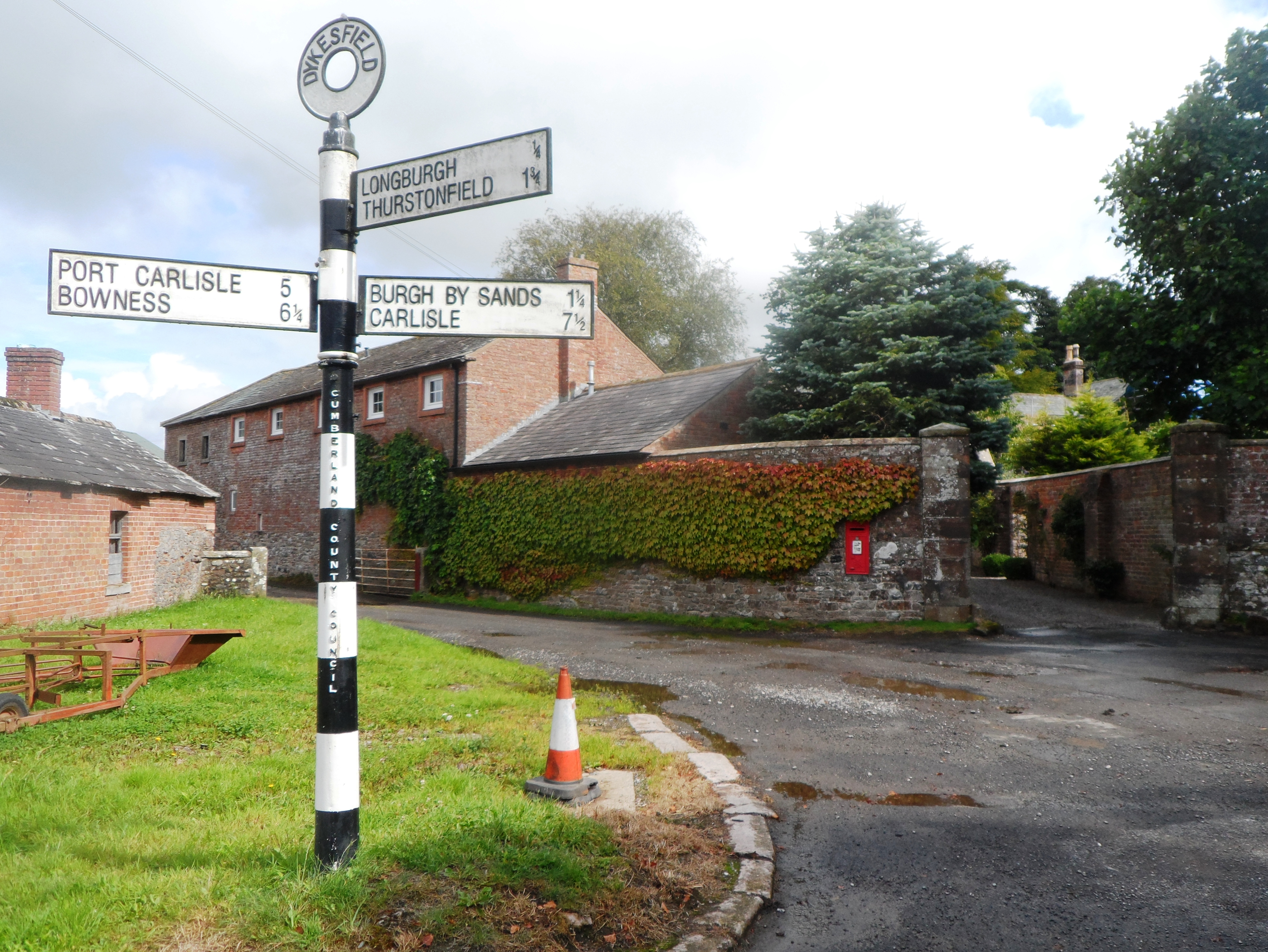
- Dykesfield crossroads

- Location in the former Carlisle district, Cumbria Location within Cumbria
- OS grid reference: NY307591
- Civil parish: Burgh by Sands
- Unitary authority: Cumberland
- Ceremonial county: Cumbria
- Region: North West
- Country: England
- Sovereign state: United Kingdom
- Post town: CARLISLE
- Postcode district: CA5
- Dialling code: 01228
- Police: Cumbria
- Fire: Cumbria
- Ambulance: North West
- UK Parliament: Carlisle

Dykesfield is a hamlet in Cumbria, England. Occupied since at least Roman times, archaeologists have excavated at Dykesfield. It contains Dykesfield House and nearby is the Solfield marshes.

== See also ==
- Listed buildings in Burgh by Sands
