= Newburg Township =

Newburg Township may refer to:

- Newburg Township, Izard County, Arkansas, in Izard County, Arkansas
- Newburg Township, Pike County, Illinois
- Newburg Township, Mitchell County, Iowa
- Newburg Township, Fillmore County, Minnesota

== See also ==
- Newberg Township, Michigan
- Newburgh Township, Cuyahoga County, Ohio
