= Feudal barony of Burgh by Sands =

The feudal barony of Burgh by Sands, originally known as Burgh, (also known as the Honour of Burgh by Sands) (pronounced "Bruff") was a feudal barony with its caput in Burgh by Sands, Cumberland, England.

The barony of Burgh was granted by Ranulf le Meschin, Earl of Chester to his son-in-law Robert d'Estrivers. It passed by marriage of his daughter and heiress Ibria to Ranulf d'Engayne. It later passed by the heiress Ada de Engaine to Simon de Morville. The barony passed by successive heirs female to the families of Multon, Dacre, and Howard.

It was purchased by John Lowther, 1st Viscount Lonsdale in 1685.

== Sources ==
- Sanders, I.J. English Baronies: A Study of their Origin and Descent 1086–1327, Oxford, 1960, pp. 23–4, Burgh-by-Sands
