= Samuel Rappaport =

American politician

Member of the Pennsylvania House of Representatives from the 182nd district
- In office January 5, 1971 – November 30, 1984
- Preceded by: Louis Silverman
- Succeeded by: Babette Josephs

Personal details
- Born: August 25, 1932 Philadelphia, Pennsylvania
- Died: February 8, 2016 (aged 83) Philadelphia, Pennsylvania
- Party: Democratic

Samuel Rappaport (August 25, 1932 – February 8, 2016) was a Democratic member of the Pennsylvania House of Representatives. He served in the Pennsylvania House from 1971 to 1984.
