= Newburgh =

Newburgh ("new" + the English/Scots word "burgh") may refer to:

== Places ==
=== Scotland ===
- Newburgh, Fife, a former royal burgh
- Newburgh, Aberdeenshire, a village

=== England ===
- Newburgh, Lancashire, a village
- Newburgh, North Yorkshire, a village
- Newburgh Priory, North Yorkshire
- Winfrith Newburgh, Dorset

=== Canada ===
- Newburgh, Ontario, a village

=== United States ===
- Newburgh, Indiana, a town
- Newburg, Jasper County, Iowa, an unincorporated community formerly known as Newburgh
- Newburgh, Maine, a town
- Newburgh (city), New York, named after Newburgh, Fife, Scotland, by Scottish emigrants
- Newburgh (town), New York, adjacent to the City of Newburgh
- Newburgh, Ohio, a village that was annexed by the city of Cleveland in 1873; now the South Broadway neighborhood
- Newburgh Heights, Ohio

== People ==
- William of Newburgh (1130s–1190s), 12th century English historian
- Earl of Newburgh, created in the Peerage of Scotland in 1660 for James Livingston, 1st Viscount of Newburgh, along with the subsidiary titles Viscount of Kynnaird and Lord Levingston
- Brockhill Newburgh (c. 1659–11 January 1741), Ireland MP, chairman of Linen Board
- Thomas Newburgh (c.1695–1779), Ireland, poet

== Ships ==
- USS Newburgh (ID-1369), also reported as ID-3768, a United States Navy cargo ship in commission in 1919

== See also ==
- Newberg (disambiguation)
- Newborough (disambiguation)
- Newburg (disambiguation)
- Newburgh Conspiracy, what appeared to be a planned military coup by the Continental Army in March 1783, when the American Revolutionary War was at its end
