= Newburg, California =

Coordinates: 40°35′59″N 124°07′29″W

Newburg (formerly, Newberg) is a locality in Humboldt County, California. It is located 1.5 miles (2.4 km) east of Fortuna, at an elevation of 121 feet (37 m).

The town, originally named Newberg, was built by the Eel River Valley Lumber Company in 1884.

== The Eel River Valley Lumber Company ==

The May 30, 1896 edition of the Eel Valley Advance, a Fortuna newspaper, carried an article which described the Eel River Valley Lumber Company and also included biographical sketches of the owners. Today Newburg no longer exists. The buildings are gone, the mill pond has become farmland and the railroad tracks have disappeared.
