= Cardiff Lions =

Welsh rugby union club, based in Cardiff

Cardiff Lions Rugby Football Club Clwb Rygbi Llewod Caerdydd
- Founded: 2004; 22 years ago
- Location: Cardiff, Wales
- Chairman: Duncan Cameron
- Captain: Joel Hamer Head coach = Tomas Andrews
1st kit	2nd kit

Official website
- www.cardifflionsrfc.com

The Cardiff Lions RFC (Welsh: Clwb Rygbi Llewod Caerdydd) is a gay and inclusive rugby union football club based in Cardiff, Wales. The club was founded in 2004 and is the first of two gay and inclusive rugby clubs in Wales. The Lions were admitted as members of the International Gay Rugby Association and Board in 2006.

== History ==
=== Union Cup ===
The Lions have competed in the three Union Cup tournaments to date; 2005 in Montpellier and 2007 in Copenhagen and 2009 in London. The 2007 tournament was a great success: Ten Lions players and Lions fans were joined by 2 of the Newcastle Ravens and one player from the Bristol Bisons RFC. The club recorded victories over NOP Amsterdam Rugby Club (35–5), Malmö Devilants, twice, (30–5 and 35–0) and the Caledonian Thebans RFC (5–25), drawing with the Emerald Warriors 10–10 on the way. The club missed out in a tense final in Copenhagen to the Emerald Warriors RFC 10–5 after extra time.

In 2009, the Lions competed in the Union Cup and won all their matches to finish as champions. In the group stage they beat Kings Cross Steelers 2nd XV (19–0), Los Valents (26–12), Newcastle Ravens (0–22) and Caledonian Thebans (0–26). They then beat the Steelers 2nds XV again in the final, 29–7. Several squad members also played for Bristol Bisons RFC, who won the tournament's 7s competition. Lions Captain Justin Gyphion was the tournament's top try scorer.

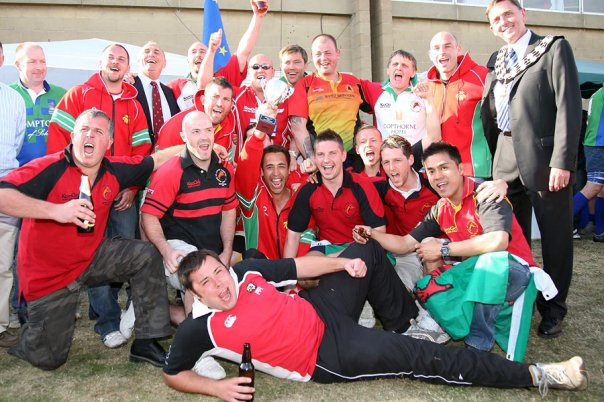
Cardiff Lions – Union Cup 2009 10s Winners

=== Bingham Cup ===
The Cardiff Lions travelled to New York, NY in May 2006 for the 3rd Mark Kendall Bingham Memorial Tournament where they came 6th in the Plate competition.

In June 2008 the Cardiff Lions travelled to Dublin for the 4th biennial Bingham Cup hosted magnificently by the Emerald Warriors. The structure of the competition and seedings put the Lions in the lower tier and competing for either the second tier Plate, third tier Bowl or fourth tier Shield. A travelling squad of 23 players and 6 support staff made a vast improvement on the previous Bingham Cup results:

Friday 13 June Game 1, Cardiff Lions 41 Phoenix Storm 10 Game 2, Cardiff Lions 36 Copenhagen Scrum 0

Saturday 14 June Game 3, Cardiff Lions 56 Manchester Village Spartans 2nds 0 Plate/Bowl decider, Cardiff Lions 31 Atlanta Bucks 0

Sunday 15 June Quarter Final Plate, Cardiff Lions 21 Emerald Warriors 19 Semi Final Plate, Cardiff Lions 5 Sydney Convicts 2nds 27

These results left the Cardiff Lions in 3rd place in the Plate competition after winning the 3rd/4th play-off boat race at the closing ceremony against San Francisco Fog RFC 2nds. A huge improvement on the previous Bingham Cup and with a lot more teams taking part (32 from around the world).

== The future ==
Next up for the club will be the Hadrian Cup in February. This is the annual 10's competition hosted by The Newcastle Ravens. The club also has ambitions to expand and improve the squad, developing links with local clubs.
