= Homosexuality in modern sports =

LGBTQ+ issues in sports

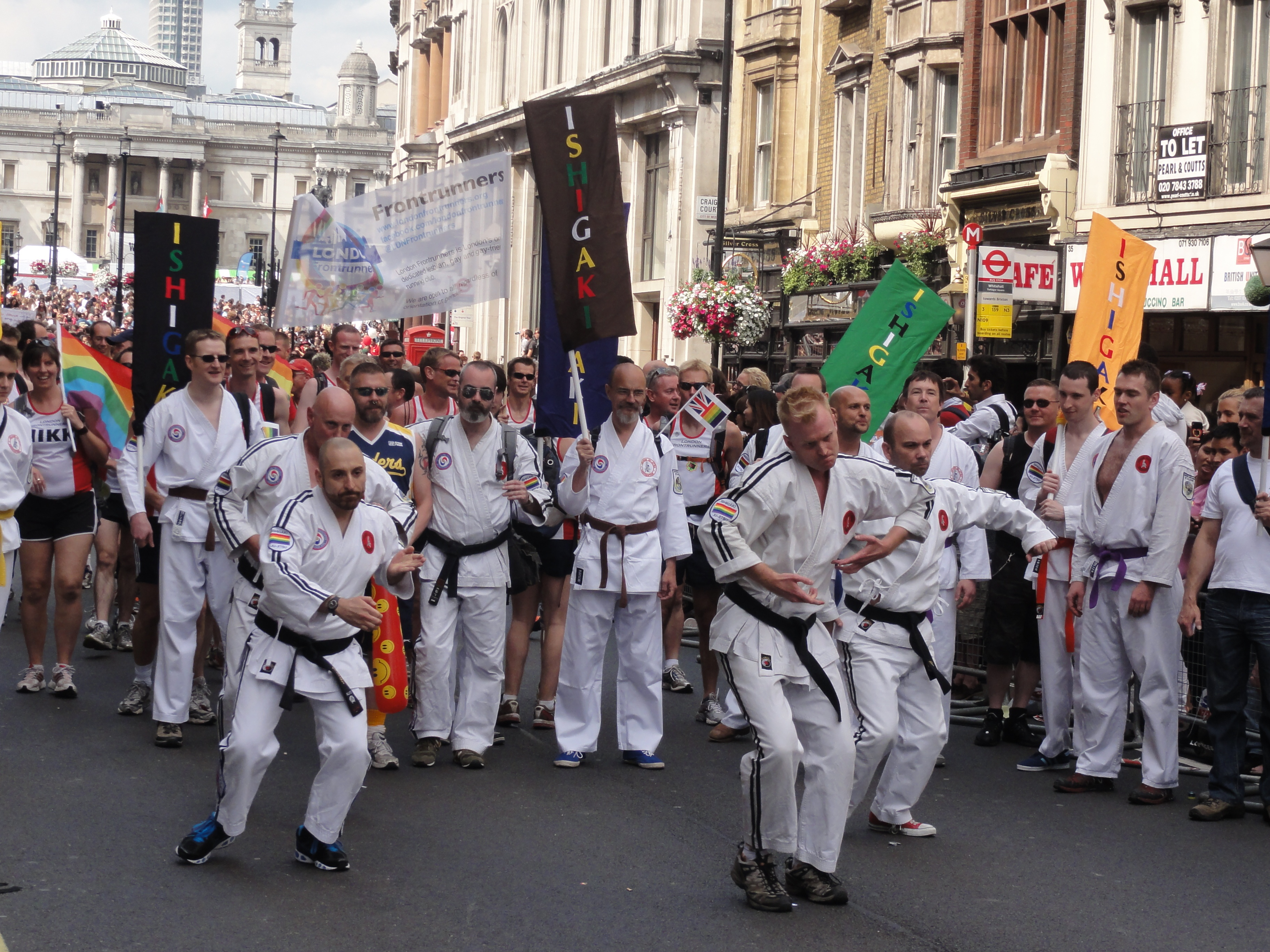
LGBTQ martial artists from Ishigaki Jujitsu marching in Pride in London in 2011

The lesbian, gay, bisexual, transgender, queer, and other non-heterosexual or non-cisgender (LGBTQ+) community is prevalent within sports across the world.

There have been many notable openly LGBTQ+ athletes around the world, including Jason Collins, John Curry, Orlando Cruz, and Billie Jean King. In 1982, the international Gay Games was founded to complement the Olympics. Since then, many LGBTQ sporting organizations have been founded along with sporting events that feature LGBTQ athletes.

While overall, the trend is towards open acceptance of gay athletes, the level of acceptance can vary due to factors such as the athlete's age, sport, and location. As a consequence of the existing homophobia in the sports community, there have been notable lawsuits fighting against this discrimination.

The first and largest international study conducted on homophobia in sports, published in 2015, surveyed 9494 athletes with varying sexual identities. The survey found that 1% of the participants believed that lesbian, gay, and bisexual athletes were 'completely accepted' in sports culture, while 80% of respondents said they had witnessed or experienced homophobia in a sporting environment. The rates and occurrences of discrimination based on sexuality in sports were high, with 62% of survey respondents claiming that homophobia is more common in team sports than any other part of society. Additionally, the study found that the United States was the least LGBTQ+-inclusive country, while Canada ranked the most inclusive.

== Notable LGBTQ+ athletes ==
=== John Curry ===
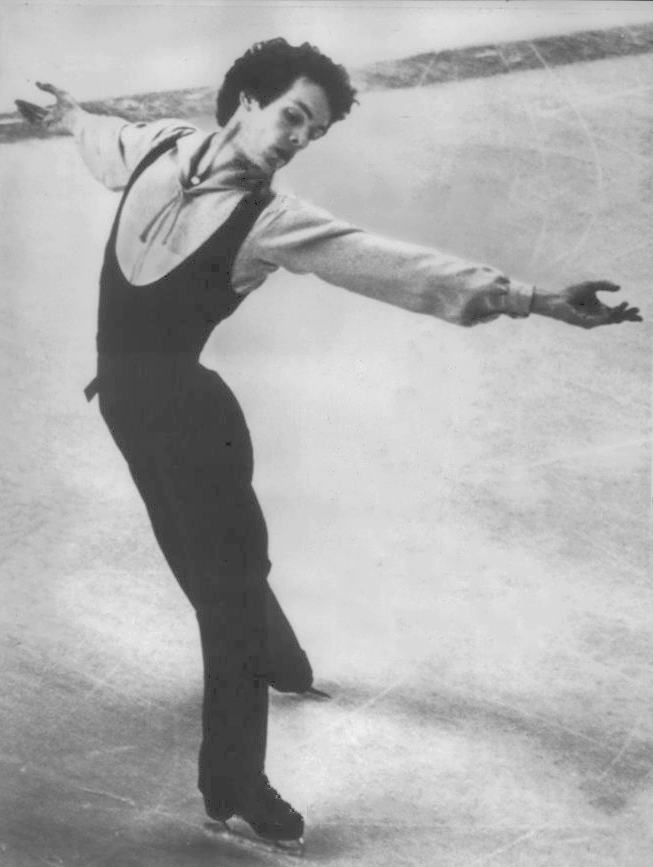
John Curry at the 1976 Winter Olympics

John Curry (1949–1994) was a successful British figure skater. Using his unique skating style, Curry won the gold medal in the 1976 Olympic Games in Innsbruck, Austria. Two days after his victory, Curry confirmed a newspaper report about his sexuality, becoming one of the first openly gay gold medalists. Less than three weeks later, and amid the fallout from the revelations, Curry won gold again at the World Figure Skating Championships in Gothenburg. He had completed a "grand slam" of European, Olympic and World championships in under 50 days. Curry died at the age of 44 after a fight with AIDS.

=== Billie Jean King ===
Billie Jean King is a former number one women's tennis player in the world and, according to KK Ottesen of the Washington Post, is known as a feminist icon. She was born in California in 1943 and competed professionally throughout the 1960s and 1970s. King acknowledged her relationship with Marilyn Barnett when it became public in a May 1981 palimony lawsuit filed by Barnett, making King the first prominent female professional athlete in the world to come out. After this revelation, King took a stronger stance on the push for gay rights, and continued to vouch for gender equality, specifically equal pay. In 2009, she was awarded a Presidential Medal of Freedom by the White House in recognition of her involvement in pushing for gender equality and the fact she was a notable and successful openly lesbian athlete.

=== Jason Collins ===
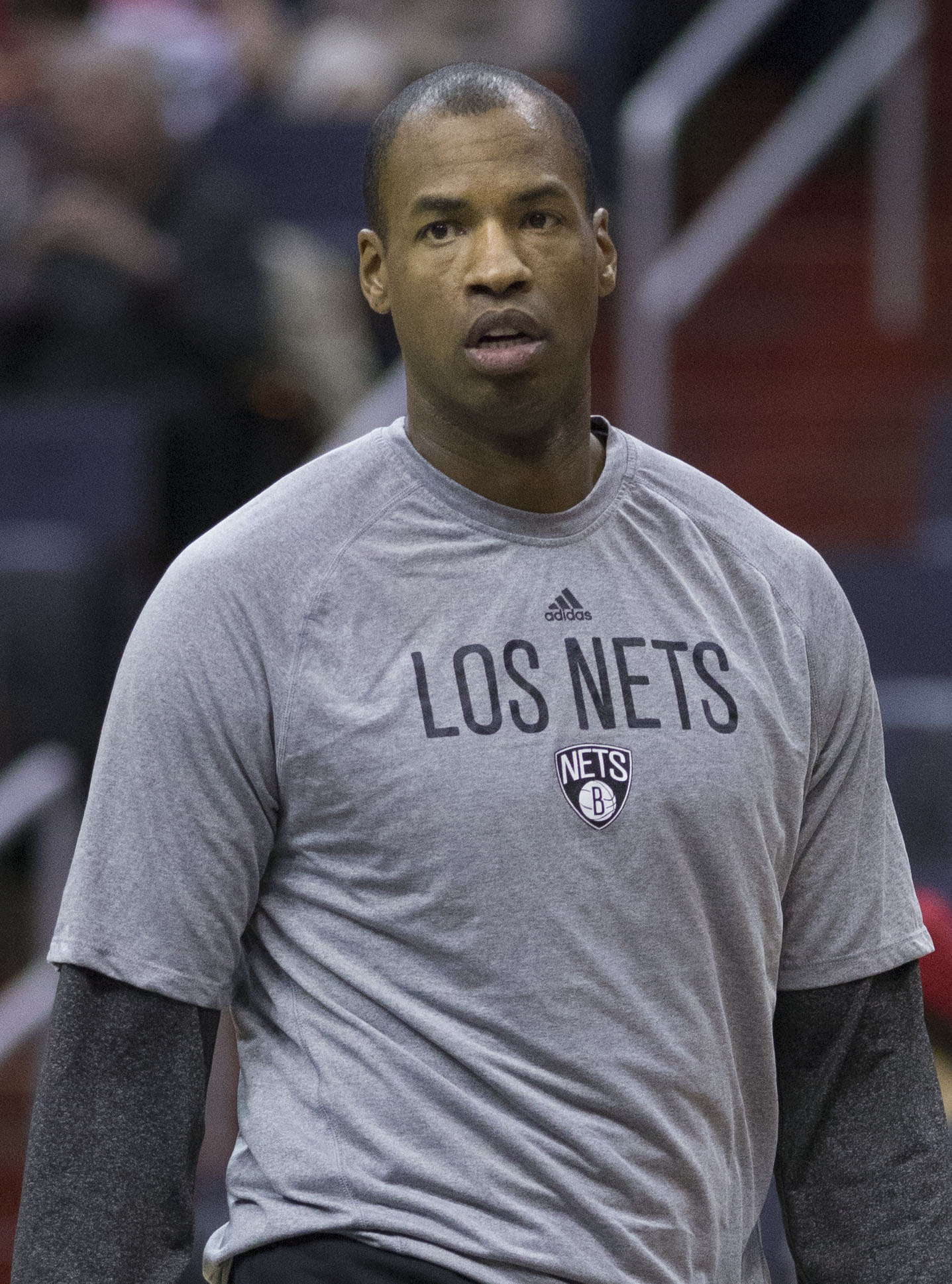
Jason Collins with the Brooklyn Nets in 2014. He became the first gay athlete to be out while actively playing in any of the four major North American professional sports leagues.

Jason Collins (1978–2026) was a US collegiate and professional basketball player. Collins played Division One basketball at Stanford University where he received First Team All-Pac10 honors in the 2000–2001 season. Later, he was drafted in the first round of the National Basketball Association (NBA) draft where he played 13 seasons. In 2013, Collins came out as gay in a Sports Illustrated article written in the first person with the help of a journalist, which officially made him the first openly gay NBA player. In 2014, he played for the Brooklyn Nets of the NBA, making him the first gay athlete to be out while actively playing in any of the four major North American professional sports leagues. Although his reveal did not come without its critics, Collins received positive support and was pictured on the cover of Time Magazine's Top 100 Most Influential People. He died in May 2026 from brain cancer.

=== Michael Sam ===
Michael Sam, born in 1990, was a US collegiate football player at the University of Missouri. At Missouri, in his final season in 2013, Sam was named the Southeastern Conference (SEC) Defensive Player of the Year, and he was also named an All-American. Following his collegiate career, in an interview with ESPN, Sam openly came out as gay. In April 2014, Sam was selected in the seventh round of the National Football League (NFL) draft by the St. Louis Rams, becoming the first openly gay athlete ever to be drafted into the NFL. Subsequently, Sam was awarded the 2014 ESPYS Arthur Ashe Courage Award for "courageously announc[ing] he was gay prior to the NFL draft." However, the Rams released him during the final preseason roster cuts. He also spent time on the Dallas Cowboys' practice squad before being waived. He signed with the Montreal Alouettes before the 2015 season, and became the first publicly gay player to play in a Canadian Football League regular-season game. However, he left the league after that one game.

=== Megan Rapinoe ===
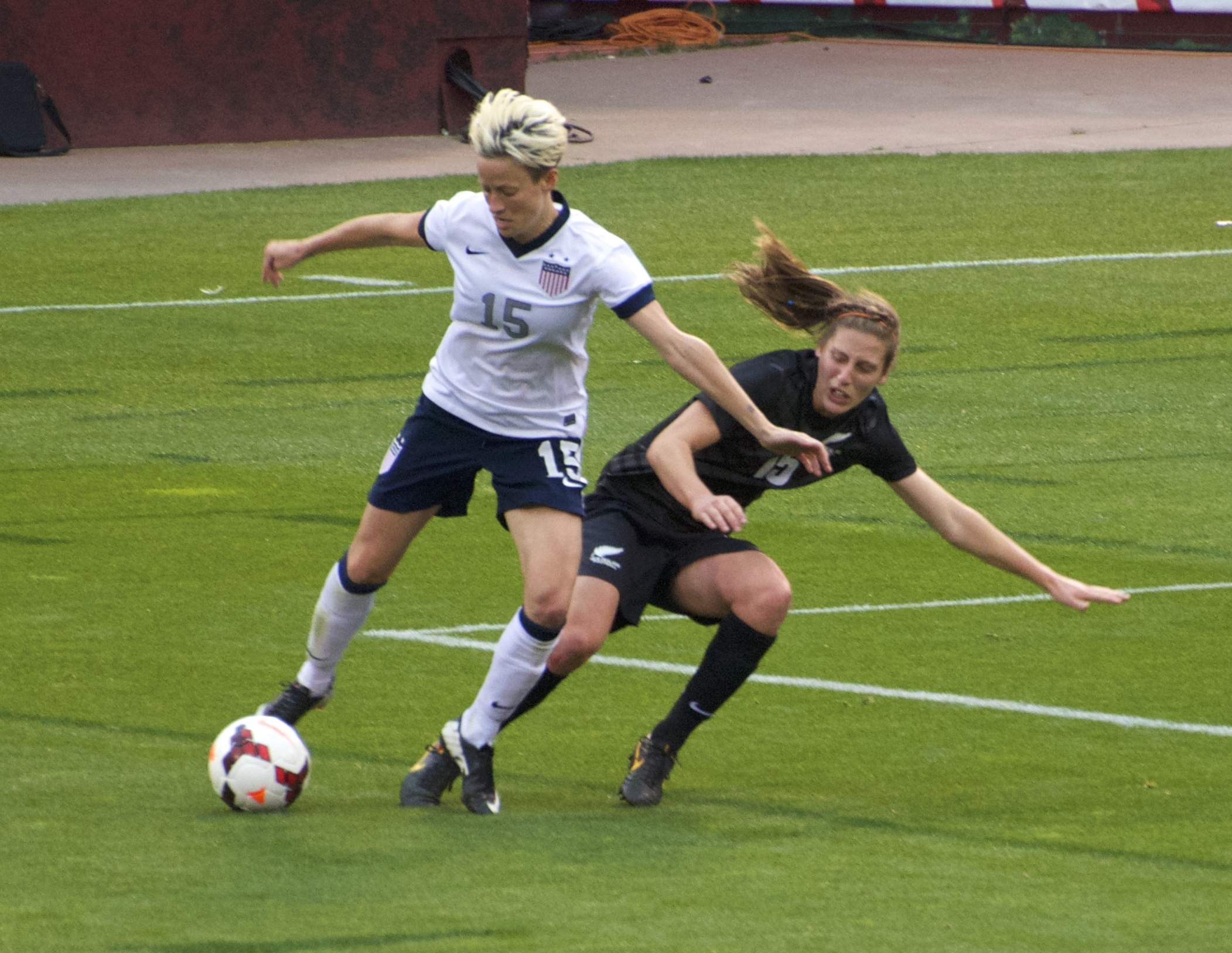
Rapinoe battles for the ball during a friendly match against New Zealand in 2013.

Megan Rapinoe, born in 1985, is a notable women's soccer player. Rapinoe is a two-time FIFA Women's World Cup champion with the United States women's national soccer team, the latter of which she was awarded the Golden Boot and Golden Ball award for her performance in the tournament. Rapinoe is openly lesbian, and in 2013 she received the Board of Directors Award by the Los Angeles Gay and Lesbian Center for her role in activism for the LGBTQ+ community. The world champion is also well known for her activism in other sectors, such as gender and racial inequality.

== Homophobia in sports culture ==
Heteronormativity, from professional sports to children's athletics, can be seen as the dominant paradigm in sports culture. It is defined as the view of heterosexuality as the standard or preferred sexuality, and this exclusive way of thinking is often taken to the extreme in sports culture, which subsequently places an emphasis on hegemonic masculinity. Arnd Krüger has shown that the history of homosexuality in sports is closely linked to the history of sports and goes back to antiquity. The prevalence of heteronormative thinking in athletics has led to a sports culture that is traditionally highly intolerant to homosexuality. This attitude has been documented in adolescent sports especially, as a recent study by Danny Osborne and William E. Wagner, III showed that male adolescents who participated in popular sports, such as football, basketball, and baseball were significantly more likely to hold homophobic attitudes than other peers their age. In 1995, three athletes (in the NFL, NBA and track and field) who spoke to The Advocate said that they were more afraid of the reaction of their teammates than the media response.

In a 2009 study on the well-being of same-sex-attracted youth in the United States, Lindsey Wilkinson and Jennifer Pearson found that lower self-esteem and higher rates of depression in same-sex attracted youth were correlated with the prevalence of football in high schools. Sociology researchers Sartore and Cunningham also found similar stigmatization in the view of homosexual coaches, as high school parents were shown to be unwilling to allow their children to be coached by someone who is gay or lesbian. They also found a similar attitude from high school athletes themselves toward participating on teams coached by either gay or lesbian coaches. However, recent scholars have documented an increasing trend toward openly gay athletes in high school and collegiate level sports.

=== Sports leagues and individuals ===
In North America, few athletes are out in the four major men's professional leagues: Major League Baseball (MLB), National Basketball Association (NBA), National Football League (NFL), and National Hockey League (NHL). Very few atheletes have come out while playing, with most coming out after retirement. This same trend can also be found in England's Professional Footballers' Association (PFA), as a 2010 ad campaign devised by the PFA against homophobia failed because no professional football (here meaning soccer) player was willing to associate themselves with the advertisement. The trend is also prevalent among English soccer fans. A 2018 study showed that among live attendance fans, the use of homophobic slurs is extremely common. The study finds that the motive behind the offensive language is that the fans are"try[ing] to gain an advantage for their team."

Out on the Fields, a survey initiated in 2015 by members of the organizing committee of Bingham Cup Sydney 2014, the world cup of gay rugby, and members of the Sydney Convicts, Australia's first gay rugby union club, is the first and largest international study conducted on homophobia in sports. It surveyed 9494 athletes with varying sexual identities (25% of which identified as heterosexual). The survey found that 1% of the participants believed that lesbian, gay, and bisexual athletes were 'completely accepted' in sports culture, while 80% of respondents said they had witnessed or experienced homophobia in a sporting environment. The rates and occurrences of discrimination based on sexuality in sports are high with 62% of survey respondents claiming that homophobia is more common in team sports than any other part of society. Additionally, the study found that the United States was the least LGBTQ+ inclusive country, while Canada ranked the most inclusive.

There is a gender difference in the responses to male and female athletes who come out as LGBT. Brittney Griner softened the blowback from announcing her sexuality by casually coming out in an interview almost immediately after being drafted into the Women's National Basketball Association (WNBA) in the United States. This was a month before Jason Collins came out in the NBA, and there was a media uproar for him, while there was barely any coverage over Griner's announcement.

== International ==
=== Olympics and Paralympics ===
LGBTQ athletes have competed in the Olympic and Paralympic games since their origins. Summer sports tend to have more out athletes than winter sports. The number of out LGBTQ athletes has trended upwards over the years, peaking in the 2020 Summer Olympics with 331 out athletes and the 2020 Summer Paralympics with 51 out athletes. Controversies and protests have resulted, often affected by which country was hosting.

=== LGBTQ leagues, teams, and events ===
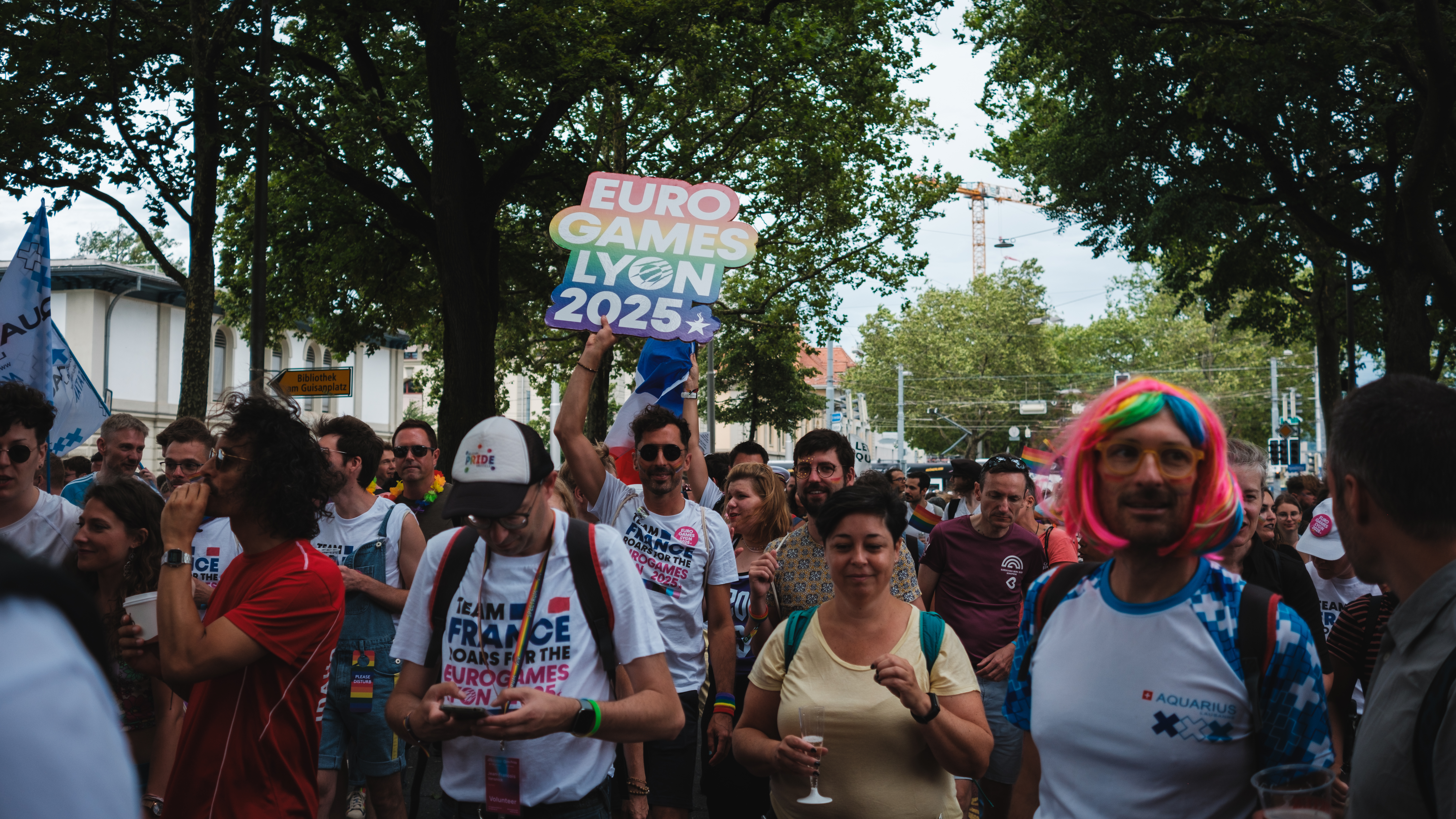
EuroGames Lyon 2025 promo banner at Bern Pride 2023

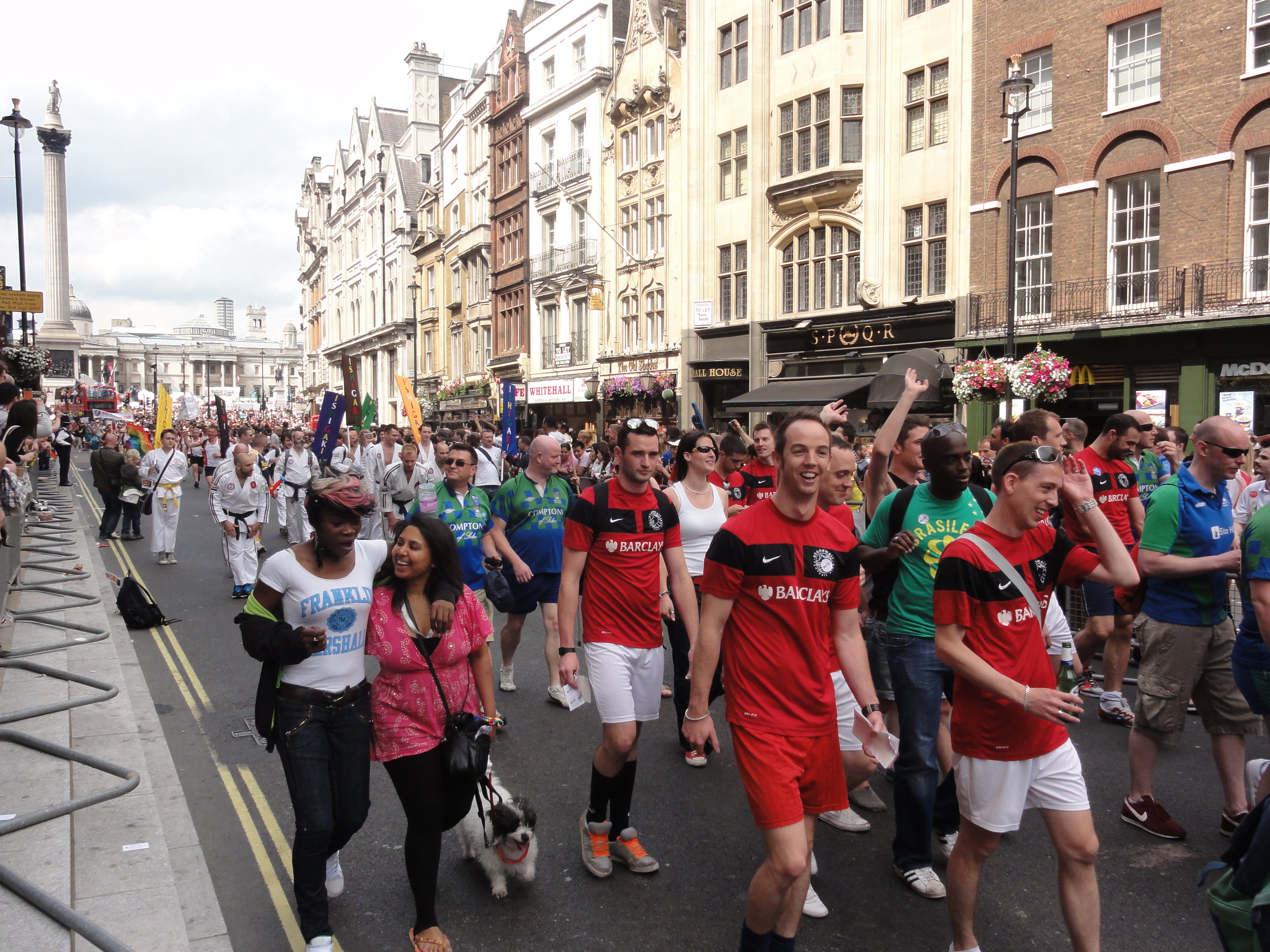
LGBTQ English football and rugby players marching in Pride in London in 2011

==== Multi-sport ====
One of the earliest-recorded gay sports event organizing committees is the Federation of Gay Games (initially known as the United States Gay Olympics Committee), which was established in 1980 by Tom Waddell, Mark Brown and Paul Mart. The Gay Games is a worldwide sport and cultural event that promotes acceptance of sexual diversity, featuring LGBTQ athletes, artists and other individuals. Founded as the Gay Olympics, it was started in the United States in San Francisco, California, in 1982, as the brainchild of Olympic decathlete (Mexico City 1968) and medical doctor Tom Waddell, Brenda Young, and others. In 2006, a schism occurred between the Federation of Gay Games and the Montreal organizing committee for the Gay Games, leading to the Montreal committee organizing a rival multi-sports event, the World Outgames, which shut down due to financial struggles in 2017.

By 1989, the European Gay and Lesbian Sport Federation was formed to organize the EuroGames for LGBTQ athletes in Europe. The EuroGames are an LGBT+ multi-sport event in Europe, licensed to a local city host each year and organized (most often) by one or more of the federation's member clubs. The official name of the EuroGames is the European Gay and Lesbian Multi-Sports Championships. It is a Dutch initiative inspired by GayGames, first organized in The Hague in 1992.

==== Individual sports ====
LGBTQ-focused leagues and events for individual sports have existed since the late 1970s.

In 1977 the North American Gay Amateur Athletic Alliance was founded. In 2023, it rebranded as International Pride Softball (iPride Softball). It is a non-profit, international association of gay and lesbian softball leagues. Also in 1977, the Gay Softball World Series was established.

In 1980, the International Gay Bowling Organization (IGBO) was formed.

The Gay and Lesbian Tennis Alliance, founded in 1991, is a not-for-profit international organization that manages and sanctions the gay tennis circuit around the world. The goal of the organization is to promote access to tennis and diversity and acceptance within the sport.

The organization International Gay Rugby was founded in 2000. The Mark Kendall Bingham Memorial Tournament (referred to as the Bingham Cup), a biennial international rugby union competition predominantly for gay and bisexual men, was established in 2002 in Mark Bingham's memory. Prior to the 2025 Women's Rugby World Cup, 40% of players were reported to have come out as queer.

The Gay Polo League is a worldwide organization of LGBTQ polo players with members in 15 countries. It was founded in 2006 by polo player Chip McKenney. It is headquartered in Wellington, Florida.

==== Advocacy organizations ====
You Can Play was founded in 2012 as an international initiative to combat homophobia in sports.

== North America ==
In North America, homosexuality remains largely stigmatized in the four major men's professional sports leagues: Major League Baseball (MLB), the National Basketball Association (NBA), the National Football League (NFL), and the National Hockey League (NHL). Jason Collins of the NBA, along with Carl Nassib and Michael Sam of the NFL, have come out while actively playing. In July 2021, Canadian Luke Prokop, drafted by the Nashville Predators in the 2020 NHL entry draft, became the first active player signed to a NHL contract to come out as gay, though he has never played in an NHL game. A small number of athletes have come out after their careers such as Wade Davis, Kwame Harris, Dave Kopay, Ryan O'Callaghan, Roy Simmons, and Esera Tuaolo (NFL); Billy Bean and Glenn Burke (MLB); and John Amaechi (NBA). In the NHL, no players who ever played in an NHL game, past or present, have come out.

Umpire Dale Scott came out as gay in 2014, becoming the first active openly gay official in the MLB, NBA, NFL or NHL.

Homosexuality is generally more accepted in the two major North American women's professional sports leagues: the Professional Women's Hockey League (PWHL) and the Women's National Basketball Association (WNBA). In the 2025-26 season, 30 active players in the PWHL were out as lesbian, bisexual, or queer. In the WNBA, openly gay players were estimated to make up 28% of the league in 2025. Sociologists who have examined lesbians in American sport in the 1980s and 1990s found overt and covert mechanisms of social discrimination. However, homophobia has been on a rapid decline over previous decades, and in 2013, studies showed that attitudes toward female homosexuality in sports have improved since the research conducted on lesbian athletes in the mid-1990s.

In college sports, the National Collegiate Athletic Association (NCAA) announced its support of LGBTQ student-athletes, coaches, and administrators in intercollegiate athletics, in 2010. Since then, the association has been defending its core values of equality, inclusion, fairness, and respect in regard to all people involved in NCAA sports and events. The defense of these values has very publicly come into play in determining host cities for championship events. The NCAA expressed concern over Indiana's Religious Freedom Restoration Act and the hosting of the 2015 Men's Basketball Final Four Tournament, and it banned North Carolina from hosting championship events until 2019 after it passed the Public Facilities Privacy and Security Act (H.B. 2).

=== Canada ===
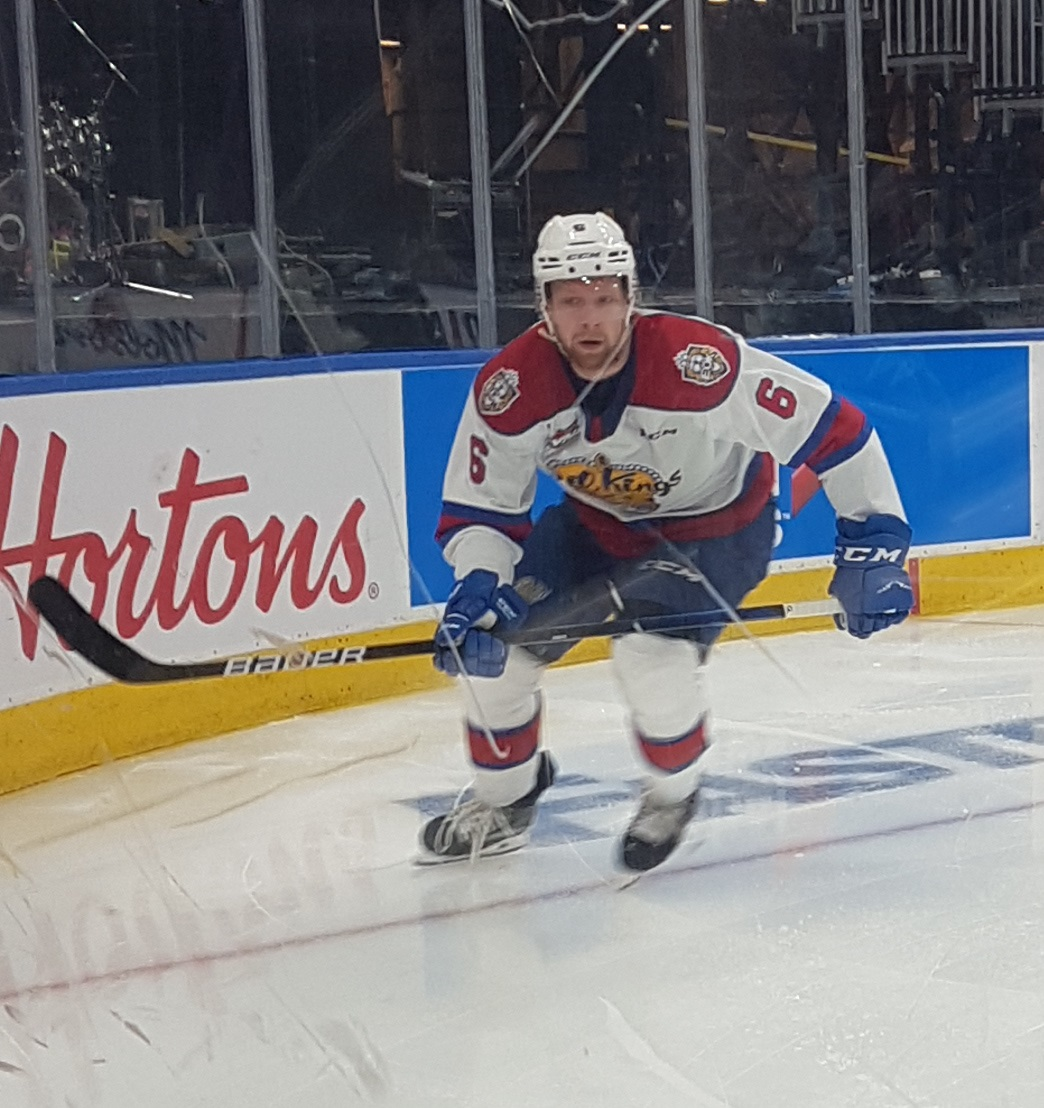
Luke Prokop

Canada is home to a large LGBTQ sports community, having hosted the inaugural World OutGames in 2006. Local organizations like Équipe Montréal, represent LGBTQ sport within their respective cities. There is also OutSport Toronto and Team Vancouver. The first North America Outgames, a gay, lesbian, bisexual and trans-gendered sports and culture event, were held in Calgary, Alberta, Canada, from April 1 to 8, 2007.

Canada was also a leader in creating the Pride House facilities for LGBTQ athletes at sporting events, organizing the first-ever Olympic Pride House when Vancouver hosted the 2010 Winter Olympics. Similarly, Toronto's Pride House during the 2015 Pan American Games was the first time a Pride House facility was available at the Pan Ams. At the 2018 Olympic Games in South Korea, the Canadian athletes' pavilion also doubled as a Pride House for all LGBTQ athletes at the games regardless of nationality, due to South Korean organizers' reluctance to organize a Pride House of their own.

In December 2013, The 519 received Toronto City Council approval to build a sports and recreation centre focused on sport inclusion. Once built, the new centre will provide a home to Toronto's over 6,000 LGBTQ sport participants.

In December 2014, Canadian skater Eric Radford publicly came out as gay in an interview with the LGBTQ publication Outsports. In doing so, he became the first competitive figure skater ever to come out at the height of his career, rather than waiting until he was near or past retirement; at the 2015 World Figure Skating Championships, Radford and Meagan Duhamel’s gold medal win in pairs skating made him the first openly gay figure skater ever to win a medal at that competition. In 2018, as part of the Canadian team he became the first openly gay man to have won a gold medal at any Winter Olympics.

On May 22, 2015, American Michael Sam signed a two-year contract with the Montreal Alouettes. The signing made him the first openly gay player in the Canadian Football League’s history. On August 7, 2015, he played for the Montreal Alouettes in a game against the Ottawa Redblacks, making him the first publicly gay player to play in a Canadian Football League regular season game. However, he left the league after that one game.

In 2021, Canadian Luke Prokop, who was drafted by the Nashville Predators in the 2020 NHL entry draft, became the first active player signed to a National Hockey League contract to come out as gay.

Canadian media have also often been leaders in covering the issue of homophobia in sports; in 1993, CBC Radio aired a groundbreaking hour-long documentary on LGBTQ sportspeople as a special episode of its sports series The Inside Track. Canadian filmmakers have also produced a number of notable documentary films about LGBTQ issues in sport, including Noam Gonick's To Russia with Love (2014), Michael Del Monte's Transformer (2017), Paul-Émile d'Entremont's Standing on the Line (2019), and The Hockey Player (2026). The Canadian drama film Breakfast with Scot, about a gay retired hockey player, was authorized by the Toronto Maple Leafs to use the team's real name and logo in the film, making it the first gay-themed film ever to receive this type of approval from a professional sports league.

Canadian sports teams are active partners in You Can Play, an international initiative to combat homophobia in sports. The initiative was launched in 2012 by Brian Burke while he was general manager of the Toronto Maple Leafs, but is active in both Canada and the United States. The Canadian Olympic Committee also organizes #oneteam, a speakers bureau for LGBTQ identified and supportive athletes to speak on homophobia in sports.

=== United States ===
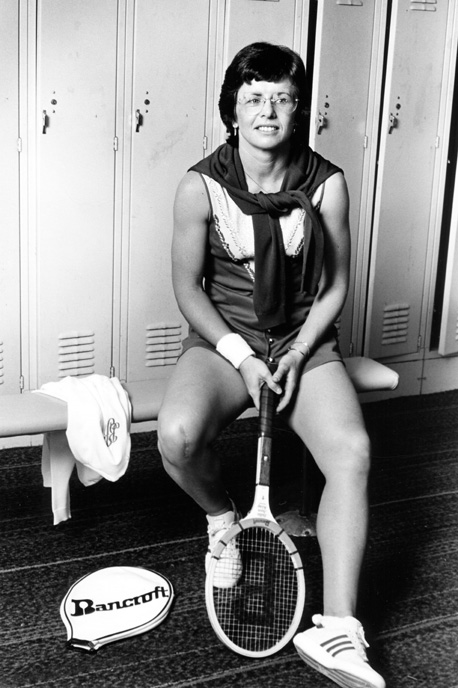
Billie Jean King in 1978 photographed by Lynn Gilbert (1978)

Prominent LGBTQ people in sports in the United States first came out publicly in the 1970s and 1980s. In 1975, former American football player David Kopay was the first professional athlete from a major team sport to come out as gay. After the public strongly denied Kopay's claims of other gay professional athletes, a study published in the Journal of Sex Research in February 1977 found that around 25% of all male college athletes have had gay experiences. Tennis player Billie Jean King acknowledged her relationship with Marilyn Barnett when it became public in a May 1981 palimony lawsuit filed by Barnett, making King the first prominent female professional athlete in the world to come out. Both athletes faced significant media scrutiny.

There has since been an increase in the number of individual athletes who have publicly come out as LGBTQ in the United States. Additionally, there have been many attempts since the 2000s by organizations such as the National Center for Lesbian Rights (NCLR) to break down homophobic attitudes in collegiate and professional team sports. The NCLR has worked with the San Francisco 49ers and collegiate athletic departments at universities such as North Carolina, Florida, and Stanford to revise team policies to more openly accommodate LBGTQ athletes.

Despite early resistance, LGBTQ athletes are now broadly accepted in women's leagues in the United States. Many women have come out in the National Women's Soccer League (NWSL), including prominent athlete Megan Rapinoe. In 2025, at least 26 NWSL players were out as lesbian or bisexual.

In men's professional sports, acceptance has increased more gradually. Few active players have come out. Some have come out in retirement.

In recent years, the 2020s anti-LGBTQ movement in the United States has impacted LGBTQ sportspeople, particularly transgender people in sports.

== Central and South America ==
=== Brazil ===
Jamerson Michel da Costa, nicknamed Messi, is the first Brazilian soccer player who came out as gay while pursuing his professional career, in September 2010.

Brazilian tennis player João Lucas Reis da Silva came out publicly in December 2024, making him the first out gay active professional male tennis player. He also played in the Rio Open in 2026, which made him the first openly gay man to compete in a main draw of an ATP match.

=== Argentina ===
In March 2020, Argentine player Sebastián Vega came out as gay through his social media accounts, becoming the first Argentine professional basketball player to do so. He later discussed the difficulties faced by openly gay male players on the court, noting that homophobic slurs are frequently used as insults.

=== Chile ===
In June 2020, Chilean player Daniel Arcos publicly came out as gay, becoming the first openly gay professional basketball player in Chile.

== Asia ==
=== India ===
Dutee Chand, a prominent female Indian athlete, came out in 2019 when she told reporters she is in a same-sex relationship. Her decision made her India's first openly gay athlete and was met by protests from her hometown, where she was declared an outcast. A couple of months later, in 2019 Summer Universiade, she claimed the gold medal.

=== Japan ===
In September 2026, Rui Takahashi, a volleyball player, became the first male professional athlete in Japan to come out publicly as gay.

== Europe ==
=== Czech Republic ===
In February 2023, Sparta Prague and Czech Republic national team midfielder Jakub Jankto came out as gay, making him the first active men's international soccer player to do so.

=== France ===
"Les Gaillards Paris Rugby Club" or "Les Gaillards Parisiens" is the first LGBTQ rugby team in France, created on 19 January 2004.

In 2018, France hosted the 10th Gay Games, helping to raise awareness for LGBTQ+ rights.

=== Germany ===
The Hamburger SV (HSV) player Heinz Bonn (1947–1991) was the first Bundesliga player to be publicly known as being gay, but only after his death. He played for HSV from 1970 to 1973. He was found murdered in his flat in Hannover on 5 December 1991, apparently by a male prostitute, according to police investigators, although the crime has never been solved. The historian Werner Skrentny has said at the time Bonn was playing, journalists had little interest in the private lives of soccer players and it would have been unthinkable for him to come out.

Following a series of injuries, German player Thomas Hitzlsperger retired from football in September 2013. He had played on the German national team and in the English Premier League. After his retirement, he came out as gay, the highest-profile male footballer in the world to do so.

Timo Cavelius, representing Germany at the 2024 Summer Olympics, became the first openly gay man to compete in Olympic judo.

=== Ireland ===
The first gay rugby team in Ireland, Emerald Warriors RFC, was established in 2003.

Ten-time national track and field winner Dennis Finnegan of Ireland came out as gay in 2020 as a guest on the Five Rings To Rule Them All podcast. Finnegan expressed on the podcast that he did so to give members of the LGBTQ+ community more "confidence."

=== Norway ===
In October 2016, Stabæk Fotball became the first European soccer club to host a pride parade preceding their home fixture against Sarpsborg 08. The team continues to host a pride parade preceding a home fixture each season.

=== United Kingdom ===
LGBTQ people in sports in the United Kingdom face varying levels of acceptance, with gay and bisexual women generally being more accepted than gay and bisexual men. Increasing restrictions on transgender people in sports in the United Kingdom mean that few if any openly transgender people are able to compete at elite levels.

==== Association football ====
In women's association football, the first known out player was English Football Hall of Fame inductee Lily Parr. She was openly a lesbian during her career from 1919 to 1951 at a time when female homosexuality, whilst (unlike male homosexuality) not illegal, was very much a taboo in British society. Several prominent players have come out as lesbians in recent decades, with attitudes around the women's game being more tolerant than the men's.

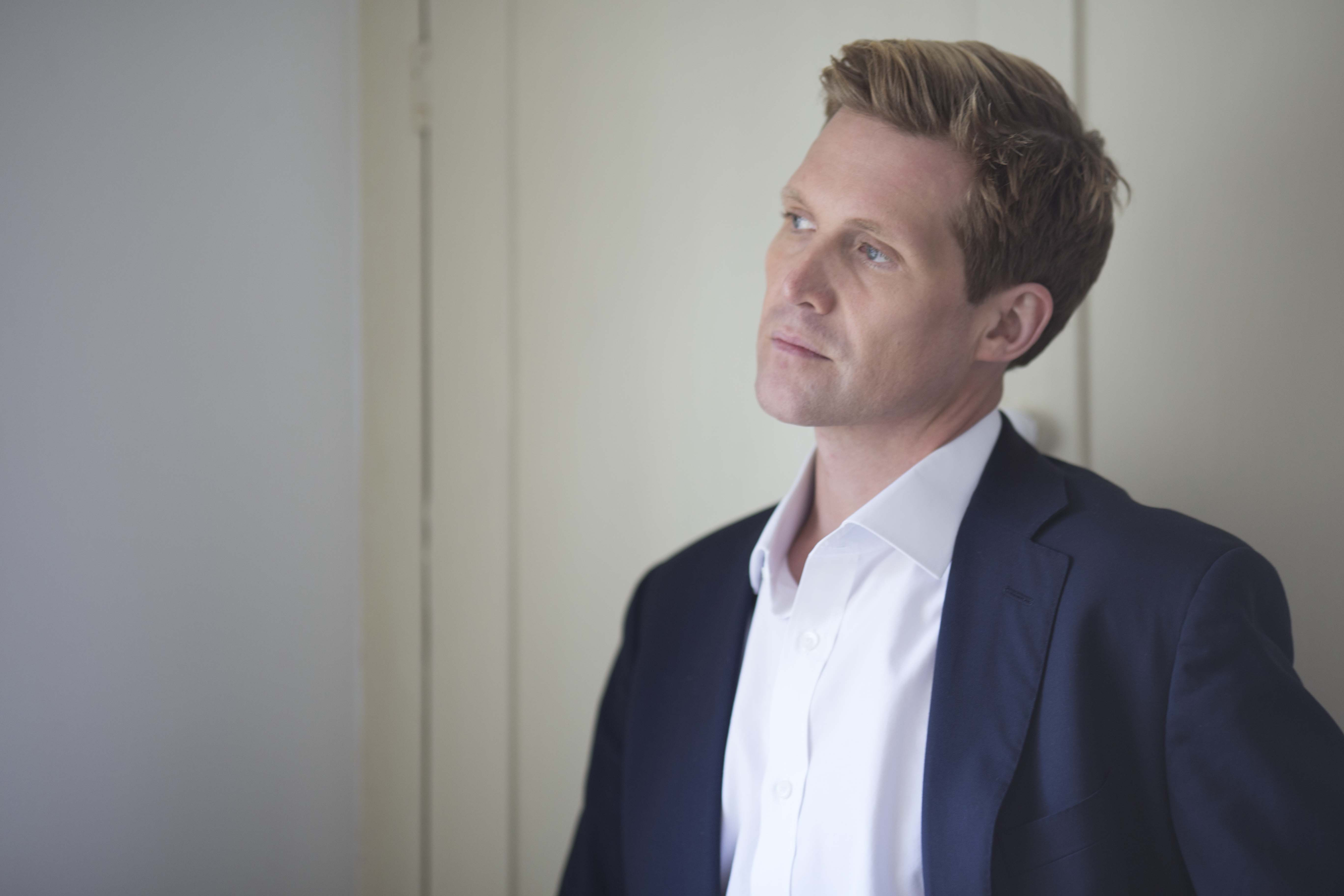
David Haigh was the first openly gay managing director of an English football club.

Several players and staff have come out as gay in British men's association football, beginning with English player Justin Fashanu in 1990. In 2013, David Haigh became the first openly gay managing director of an English soccer club. He led Leeds United to became the first Stonewall Diversity Champion in English soccer, championing gay equality within the club and wider soccer. Former Leeds United player Robbie Rogers, who was one of the first male professional soccer players to come out as gay, launched his 'Beyond It' anti-discrimination charity with David Haigh at the club.

In September 2022, Zander Murray became the first openly gay male senior soccer player in Scotland.

Despite several notable players and staff coming out, there has been little progress in the men's game. Homophobia remains deeply entrenched in the sport. This is complicated by the owners of many clubs being from countries where homosexuality is criminalized. To counteract the homophobia in the sport, several amateur and professional LGBTQ clubs and leagues have developed, including early ones such as the Gay Football Supporters Network (1989) and Stonewall F.C. (1991).

==== Rugby ====
The first openly gay rugby team in the world, the Kings Cross Steelers, was formed in 1995 in London. The first openly gay rugby team in Northern Ireland, the Ulster Titans, was formed in 2007, and the first Scottish gay rugby team, the Caledonian Thebans RFC, was formed in 2002.

The first decade of the 21st century saw two high-profile Welsh rugby union figures come out as gay while active. First, in 2007, international referee Nigel Owens came out. Then, in 2009, Gareth Thomas, at the time the country's most-capped player (and later a rugby league international), came out. Thomas was believed to be the first professional male player in a team sport to come out while active.

In August 2015, Keegan Hirst became the first British professional rugby league player to come out as gay. Later that same month, Sam Stanley became the first English rugby union player to come out as gay.

==== Cricket ====
In 1996, Graces Cricket Club was organized as the first gay cricket club in the world.

In 2011, English cricketer Steven Davies came out publicly on 27 February in an interview with The Daily Telegraph; he had come out to his family five years earlier and was also already out to his teammates. He was the first male international cricketer to come out as gay.

==== Other sports ====
Ishigaki Ju Jitsu Club began in 1994 in the United Kingdom, for gay and gay-friendly people.

Netherlands-born British squash player Jenny Duncalf revealed her relationship with her girlfriend, Australian squash player Rachael Grinham, in 2017, making them the first two squash players to publicly come out while still active in professional play.

The world's first LGBTQA inclusive lacrosse team, the Rainbow Rexes, of the United Kingdom, were founded in 2018.

== Oceania ==
=== Australia ===
In 1995 Ian Roberts, born in Britain, became the first high-profile Australian sports person and first rugby footballer in the world to come out to the public as gay.

The Sydney Convicts Rugby Club was launched in 2004 as Australia's first gay rugby union men's team.

Diver Matthew Mitcham was the 2008 Olympic champion in the 10m platform, with the 2nd highest single-dive score in Olympic history (at the time it was the highest scoring dive ever). This made him the first openly gay man to win an Olympic gold medal.

Australian squash player Rachael Grinham revealed her relationship with her girlfriend, Netherlands-born British squash player Jenny Duncalf, in 2017, making them the first two squash players to publicly come out while still active in professional play.

In May 2019, Andy Brennan came out as gay, becoming the first openly gay Australian male soccer player.

Josh Cavallo of Australia came out as gay in 2021, becoming the first active male top-flight professional soccer player to do so.

On 16 November 2022, Isaac Humphries came out as gay. The announcement meant Humphries was the first Australian male basketball player and the first player in the National Basketball League to be openly gay, and the only active openly gay male professional basketball player in a top-tier league anywhere in the world at the time.

==== Australian Football League ====
In August 2025, former Australian Football League (AFL) player Mitch Brown came out publicly as bisexual, becoming the AFL's first openly bisexual past or present player. Before his coming out, the AFL was the only major professional men's sport league worldwide to have never had an openly bisexual or gay past or present player. Later, in an interview with Melbourne community radio station JOY 94.9 on 25 March 2026, Leigh Ryswyk came out as gay, making him the first former AFL player to do so.

The AFL hosted their first Pride game in 2015 between the Sydney Swans and the Fremantle Football Club. Teams have continued to host Pride games since. In 2026, the Sydney Swans moved their annual Pride game from their match against the St Kilda Football Club to their match against the Western Bulldogs. This was due to allegations that St Kilda's Lance Collard used a homophobic slur and the ongoing tribunal hearings. The organizers of the Pride game determined the controversy around the allegations could distract from the event and impact the positive atmosphere of the game.

=== New Zealand ===
In 2022, Heath Davis came out as gay, making him the first former New Zealand national cricket team member to publicly disclose his homosexuality.

On 30 January 2023, Campbell Johnstone revealed in an interview with Hilary Barry on New Zealand television show Seven Sharp that he is gay, making him the first openly gay former All Black. The New Zealand national rugby union team, known as the All Blacks (Māori: Ōpango [ɔːpaŋɔ]), represents New Zealand in men's rugby union, which is considered the country's national sport.

== See also ==
- Homosexuality in basketball
- Homosexuality in American football
- Homosexuality in English football
- LGBTQ people in association football
- LGBTQ people in college sports
- LGBTQ people in ice hockey
- LGBTQ people in sports in the United States
- List of IGLFA member clubs
- List of LGBTQ sportspeople
- Pride Nights
- Principle 6 campaign
- Transgender people in sports
- Walk Like a Man, a 2008 documentary about two gay rugby clubs
