= Bristol Bisons RFC =

English rugby union team

(England) Bristol Bisons Rugby Football Club
- Union: Gloucestershire RFU
- Nickname: Bisons
- Founded: 2005; 21 years ago
- Location: Emersons Green, Bristol, England
- Ground: Cleve RFC
- Chairman: David McAndrew
- Coach: Sasha Acheson
- Captain: Daryn McCombe
- League: UKIGRC

Official website
- www.bisonsrfc.co.uk

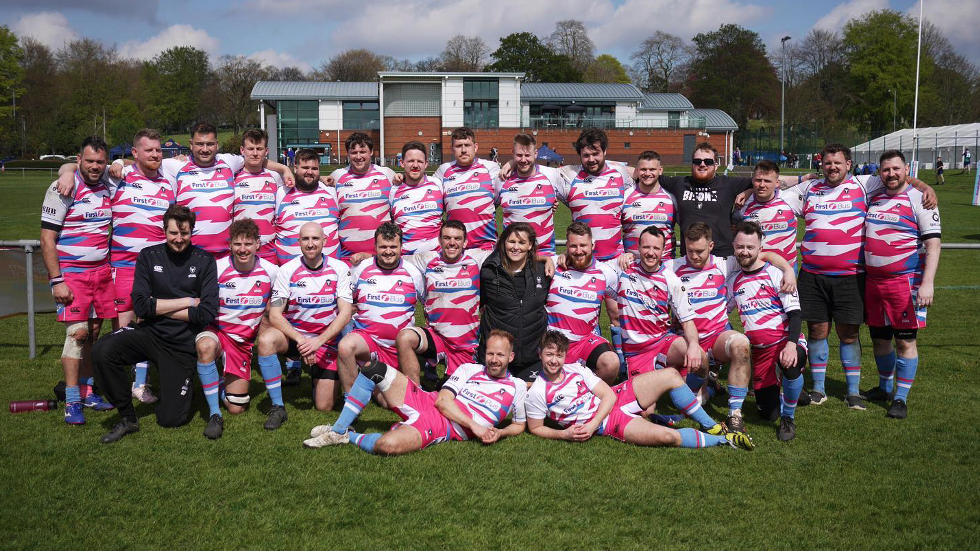
Bristol Bisons RFC Feb 2023

Bristol Bisons RFC is an inclusive English rugby union club based in Bristol. Founded in 2005 as the south west’s first inclusive rugby team, the Bisons have welcomed players (and supporters) of all abilities, backgrounds and sexualities from Bristol, Somerset, South Gloucestershire and the surrounding areas since that time.

== Club history ==
The Bristol Bisons RFC (Bisons) were established in 2005, following a visit to the Bingham Cup gay rugby tournament in the summer of 2004 in London. The founders felt that it would be good to spread the messages of an inclusive rugby team in the south west.

Training for the newly formed club started early in 2005 with its first match seeing the Bisons vs. a Barbarians side of players from Manchester and Bristol. By 2009, following a quiet spell, it was decided to relaunch the club with new kit and promotional material.

The club has had an active presence at Bristol Pride since 2010 and in July 2011, the team were chosen as hosts for the Union Cup 2013 European Gay rugby tournament, welcoming over 20 clubs to Bristol.

In 2023, after finishing top of the UK IGR Southern Development League, the Bisons were named IGR Southern Development League Champions, going on to become IGR UK Development League Champions.

In 2024, the Bisons finished top of the UK IGR South-West League, and were also named winners of the UK Championship Plate. The Bisons also entered into a new strategic partnership with Bristol Bears RFC as part of the Bears commitment to diversity and inclusivity. The club will look to collaborate together on several community initiatives.

The team also attended the 2024 Bingham Cup in Rome Italy, taking two teams to the tournament, the first time in its history. Both teams finished third in their respective tiers (Hoagland Cup and Gladiator Cup), finishing 17th overall, resulting in the Bisons best-ever Bingham placing.

In 2025, the Bisons were winners of the IGR's UK Challenger Shield and attended the Union Cup in Oslo, Norway, finishing in the top 8 in Europe.

Since June 2025, the Bisons have been hosted by and train every Monday and Thursday between 7-9pm at Cleve RFC.

As of 2025, the club now has nearly 100 active players and supporters, with current sponsorship and support from Bristol Beer Factory, Old Castle Green, Hawkland Construction, Bristol Bear Bar and the Queenshilling nightclub.

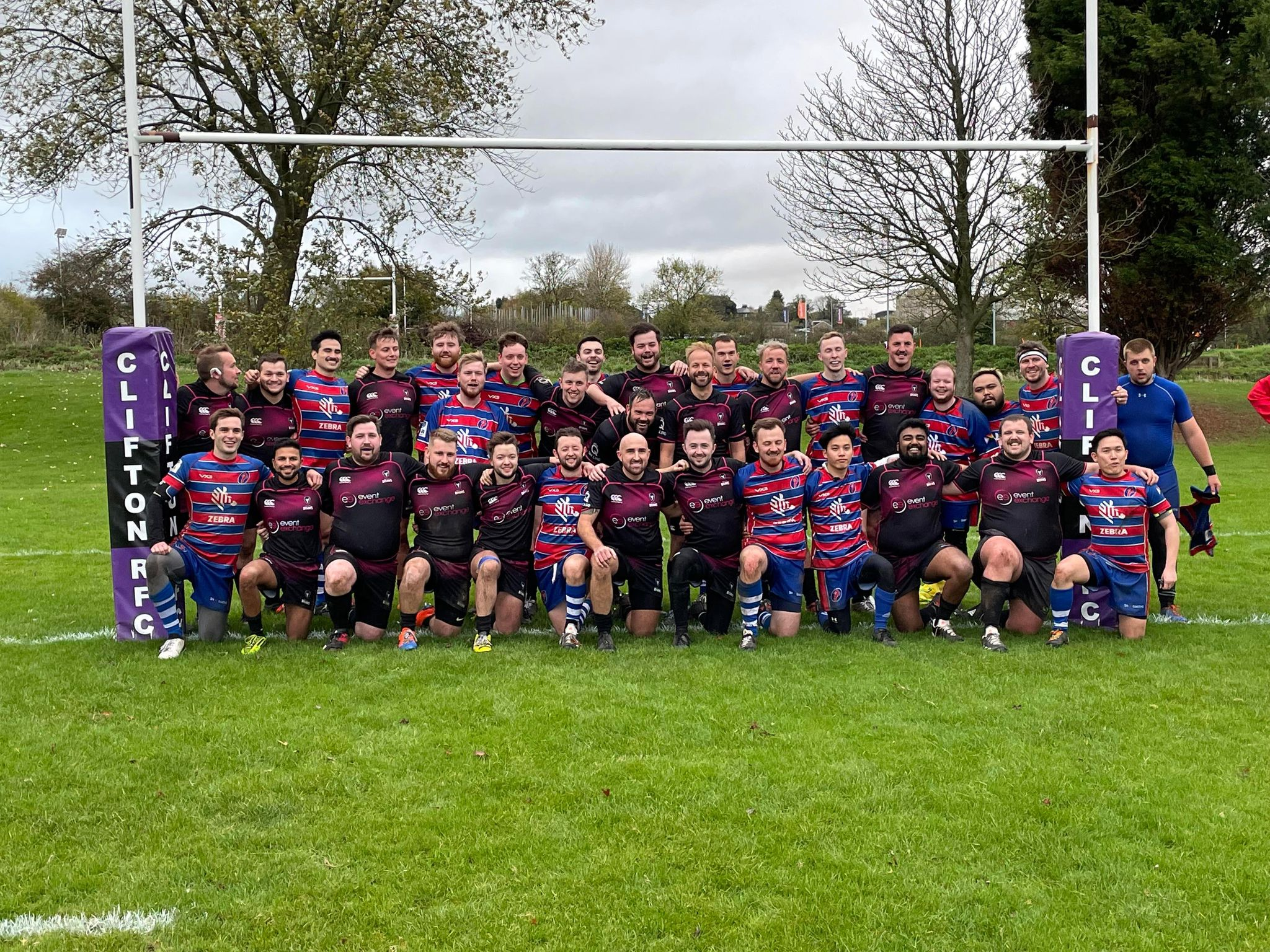
Bristol Bisons RFC vs. Reading Renegades RFC Nov 2022

== Tournaments ==
The following is a list of tournaments held by or attended by the team.

=== Tournaments hosted ===
- 2006 – Spring – Rugby Tournament, Bristol
- 2006 – Rugby 7's tournament at Bristol Gay Mardi Gras
- 2007 – Spring – Rugby Tournament, Bristol
- 2013 – Union Cup – Rugby Tournament, Bristol

=== Tournaments attended ===
==== Union Cup ====
- 2005 Montpellier, France, finished in seventh place
- 2007 Copenhagen, Denmark, part of a joint team with the Newcastle Ravens and Cardiff Lions that reached the final and lost to the Dublin Emerald Warriors RFC
- 2009 London, UK, first in the 7's after a closely fought final against the Paris team
- 2011 Amsterdam, Netherlands, second in the 10s tournament behind Montpellier, France
- 2013 Bristol, UK, hosted in Bristol, UK
- 2016 Madrid, Spain, narrowly lost out on winning the Silver Union Bowl, finishing third from bottom in the European rankings
- 2019 Dublin, Ireland, lost in the final to Kings Cross Steelers 3rds, finishing 10th over all in European rankings
- 2023 Birmingham, United Kingdom, hosted Union Cup, finishing 3rd over all (Beorma Cup) in European Rankings
- 2025 Oslo, Norway, finishing in the top 8 in Europe

==== Bingham Cup ====
- 2008 Dublin, Ireland, some members of the team played with the Cardiff Lions at the Dublin Bingham Cup in 2008
- 2012 Manchester, England
- 2018 Amsterdam, Netherlands, lost in the final of the Hoagland Bowl to Caledonian Thebans RFC, coming in 10th overall in Tier 2
- 2024 Rome, Italy. The Bisons took two teams to the tournament, the first time in its history. Both teams finished third in their respective tiers (Hoagland Cup and Gladiator Cup), finishing 17th overall, resulting in the Bisons best-ever Bingham placing.
- 2026 Brisbane, Australia. The Bisons won the Hoagland Cup.

== Memberships and affiliations ==
- Full member of the International Gay Rugby Association and Board (IGRAB)
- Affiliated members of the Gloucestershire Rugby Football Union (GRFU)
- Affiliated members of the Rugby Football Union (RFU)

== Awards ==
- 2019 - Attitude Pride Award for #KeepKenHome campaign, helping to support one of its players risking deportation to Kenya
- 2023 - Best Sports Group at the ShoutOut Listeners Awards
- 2023 - Top of the Table IGR Southern Development League
- 2023 - Winners - IGR Southern Development League Final
- 2023 - Winners - IGR UK Development League Grand Final (South vs. North)
- 2023 - Union Cup (European) - 3rd Place Beorma Cup
- 2023 - Winners - Unicorn Unity Cup
- 2024 - Winners - IGR South-West League
- 2024 - Winners - UK IGR Championship Plate
- 2024 - Bingham Cup (World) - 3rd Place Hoagland Cup and 3rd Place Gladiator Cup), finishing in 17th place out of 72 overall
- 2025 - Winners - UK IGR Challenger Shield
- 2025 - Union Cup (European) - Top 8 in Europe
- 2026 - Bingham Cup (World) - Winners, Hoagland Cup
