= Theban =

Theban can refer to:

- A thing or person of or from the city of Thebes, Greece
- A thing or person of or from the city of Thebes, Egypt
- A player from the Caledonian Thebans RFC
- The occult Theban alphabet
