= LGBTQ people in ice hockey =

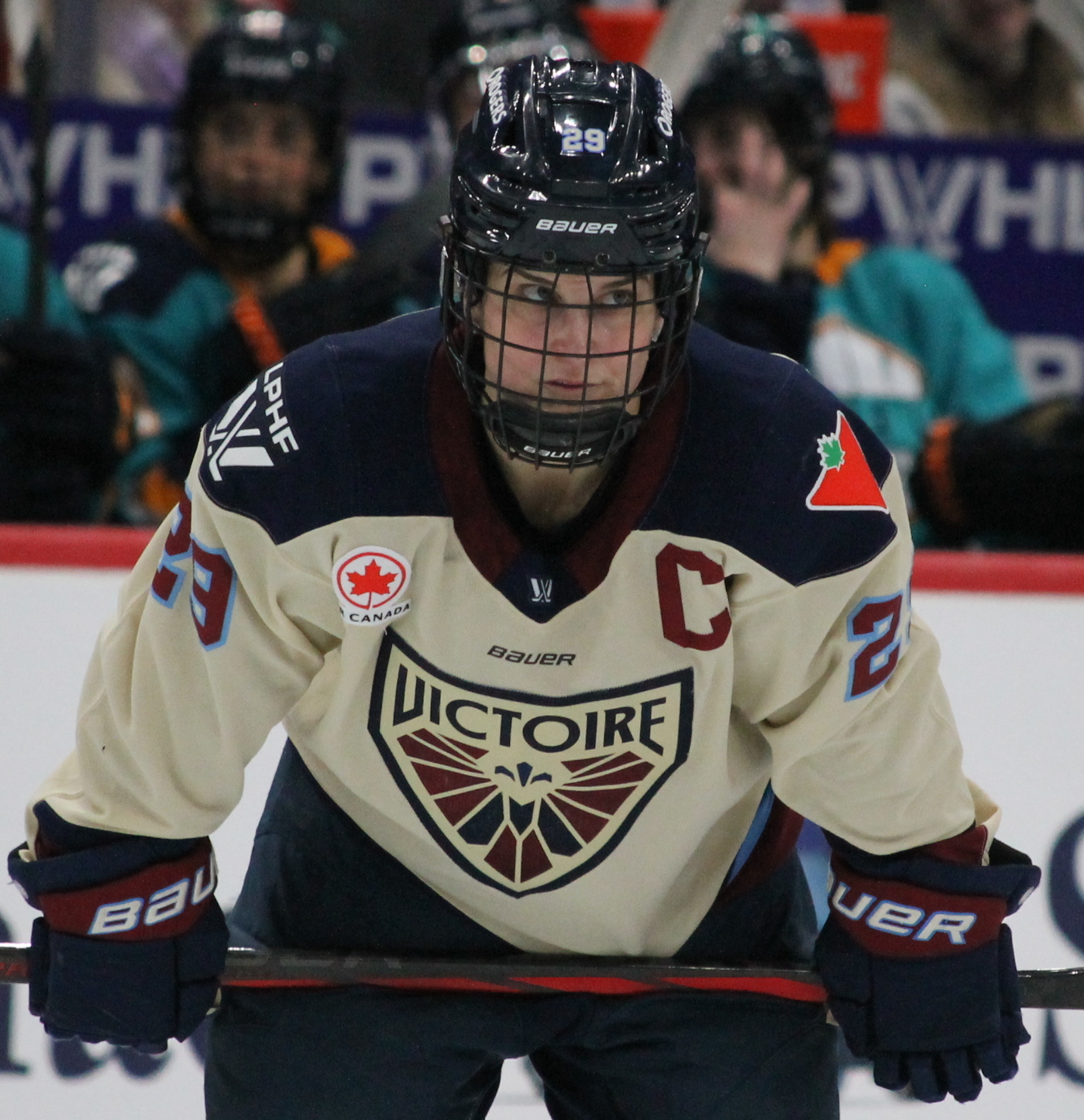
Marie-Philip Poulin, captain of the Montréal Victoire, is married to her teammate Laura Stacey.

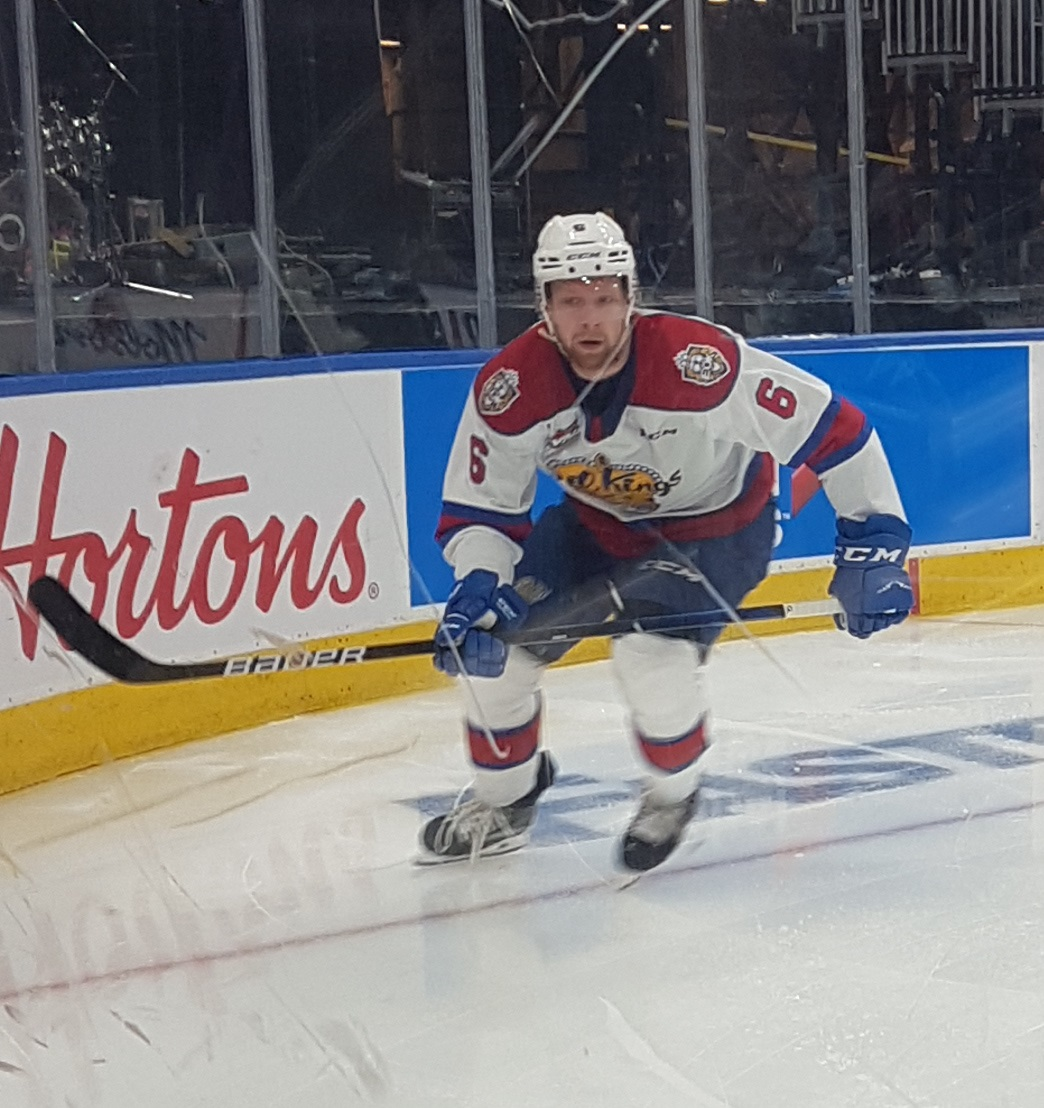
In 2021, Canadian Luke Prokop, who was drafted by the Nashville Predators in the 2020 NHL entry draft, became the first active player signed to a National Hockey League contract to come out as gay.

Homosexuality in ice hockey has historically been a taboo subject, especially in men's leagues. Players have faced varying receptions and levels of acceptance from sports organizations, fans, and other players depending on their gender, their country of origin, and the league they play in.

Men playing ice hockey have historically faced high levels of homophobia in and out of the locker room. Brock McGillis stated that “the language, behaviors and attitudes that are pervasive in the culture” make coming out in men's ice hockey very difficult. Several players who left hockey while closeted have attributed their departure to the homophobic nature of the sport.

Likely the first active professional men's hockey player to come out in any league was Danish player Jon Lee-Olsen, who came out in 2019. In 2021, Canadian Luke Prokop, who was drafted by the Nashville Predators in the 2020 NHL entry draft, became the first active player signed to a National Hockey League contract to come out as gay. Though Prokop has a contract with a National Hockey League (NHL) team, he plays in the American Hockey League (AHL). The NHL has no out players, past or present.

In women's hockey, many players are publicly out.

== Europe ==
In March 1995, Swedish hockey player Peter Karlsson was murdered for being gay. He was not publicly out.

In October 2019, Danish player Jon Lee-Olsen came out, possibly making him the first active professional men's player to come out as gay. Later that month, Janne Puhakka became the first professional Finnish player to come out as gay after retiring. He cited homophobia as one of the reasons he left ice hockey.

In 2020, Zack Sullivan became the first professional ice hockey player in the UK to come out when he came out as bisexual. He stated:

"I’m not doing this in the hope of any publicity. I’ve always been a very private guy, but I realize that I have a unique opportunity to do some good. If I can be open and honest about my sexuality, then hopefully that will give other hockey players around the country the same confidence to do the same."

== Oceania ==
Homophobic language is pervasive in ice hockey in Oceania. A 2020 study asked ice hockey players in the Australian Ice Hockey League (AHL) (16 to 31 years old) and players on the Under 18 rugby union teams in South Australia (16 to 18 years old) to self-report how often homophobic language was used in their locker rooms in the last two weeks. According to the study, over 50% of the players self-reported they had used homophobic language at least once, and nearly 70% believed their teammates had done so. Though the players competed in Australia, they were born in various countries.

Another 2020 study found that players in the AHL were 40% less likely to use homophobic language if their team hosted a Pride Night. The study also found that players who supported the LGBTQ community and believed their team would be welcoming to a gay player were just as likely to use homophobic language as those who did not.

== Women's ice hockey in North America ==
=== History ===
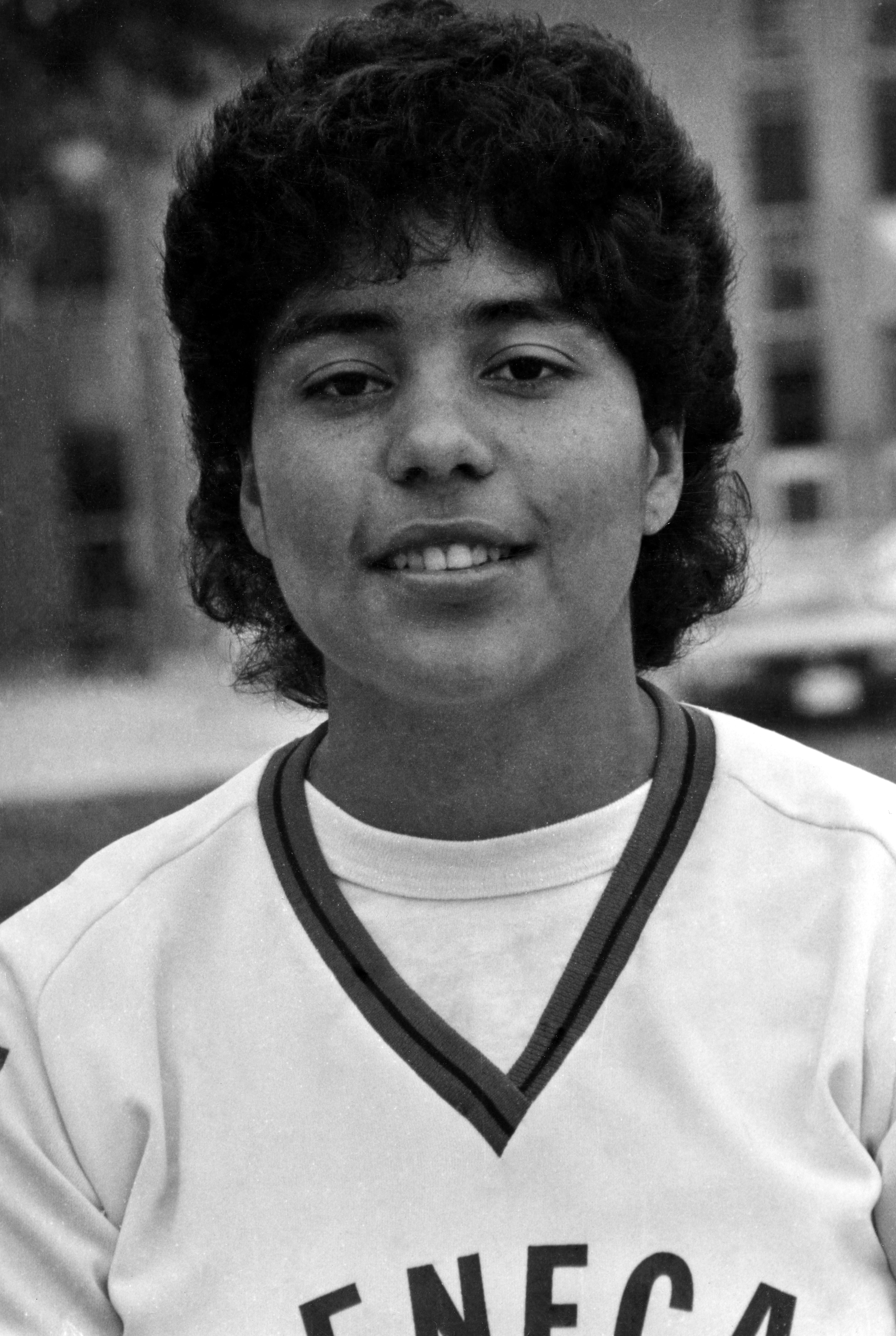
Angela James at Seneca College, c. 1983

Angela James played in the Central Ontario Women's Hockey League, precursor to the National Women's Hockey League and Canadian Women's Hockey League. She represented Canada women's national team internationally and was the team captain in the inaugural World Women's Championship in 1990. She has been called "the Wayne Gretzky of women's hockey" and remains the only Black Canadian to captain a national team.

James scored 34 points (22 goals, 12 assists) in 20 games over four Women's World Championships, including 11 goals in five games in the 1990 IIHF Women's World Championship tournament, a record that still stands today. James has won four world championship gold medals, two 3 Nations Cup gold medals, and one IIHF Pacific Rim Championship gold medal with Canada women's national team. In 2008, James, Cammi Granato (United States), and Geraldine Heaney (CAN) became the first women to be inducted into the IIHF Hall of Fame. In 2010, she was inducted into the Hockey Hall of Fame, accomplishing several firsts: the first woman (along with Cammi Granato), the first openly gay player, and the first Black woman—only the second Black player, seven years after Grant Fuhr.

Four-time Olympic medalist Julie Chu is considered among the earliest known LGBT female professional hockey players. She began dating her Canadian rival, four-time Olympic gold medalist Caroline Ouellette, around 2006.

Since then, many women playing ice hockey in the United States and Canada have come out publicly.

=== Current players and staff ===
In the 2025-26 season, 30 active players in the Professional Women's Hockey League (PWHL) were out as lesbian, bisexual, or queer.

The league has several prominent players or staff who have married each other. Caroline Ouellette, former captain of Team Canada and current assistant coach of the Montréal Victoire of the PWHL, is married to Julie Chu, a former US women's hockey captain. They captained their respective teams against each other in the 2014 Winter Olympics.

A married couple led the Canadian Olympic hockey team in the 2026 Winter Olympics. Marie-Philip Poulin is the captain of the Montréal Victoire and the captain of the Canada women's national ice hockey team. Poulin married her Montréal Victoire alternate captain and Team Canada teammate Laura Stacey on September 28, 2024. They have been in a relationship since 2017.

== Men's ice hockey in North America ==
=== History ===
==== 20th Century and early 2000s ====
Hobey Baker was an American amateur ice hockey player who was active from 1906 to 1916. He never came out publicly. In 2024, ESPN released a podcast with research suggesting that he was gay.

In 2006, a Sports Illustrated poll of roughly 1,400 professional athletes found that a majority would be willing to accept a gay teammate. NHL athletes seemed to be the most accepting of such teammates since 80% of NHL players polled approved of having a gay teammate. However, there remained no openly gay players in the NHL.

==== Brendan Burke and You Can Play ====
In November 2009, Brendan Burke came out publicly as gay after the story was leaked to ESPN. At the time, he was the student manager at for the Miami RedHawks men's ice hockey team. He had played varsity ice hockey in high school but quit because he was worried that his teammates would discover that he was gay. Upon coming out, his story made national headlines. His father was Brian Burke, who at the time was the president and general manager of the Toronto Maple Leafs. Brian was publicly accepting of his son, and they attended the 2009 Toronto Gay Pride Parade together.

Brendan died in a car accident in February 2010. On June 22, 2010, Brent Sopel brought the Chicago Blackhawks' recently-won Stanley Cup to the 2010 Chicago Gay Pride Parade in honour of Burke, stating to the press that honouring Burke's legacy and his father's example of familial support and tolerance was one of his reasons for marching in the parade. In November 2010, CBC aired a documentary titled The Legacy of Brendan Burke.

On March 4, 2012, Brendan's brother Patrick launched You Can Play in honour of Brendan. The organization's mission is to end homophobia in sports. It has partnered with the NHL and NHLPA. In February 2017, one player from each NHL team became a You Can Play ambassador.

Brock McGillis came out on November 3, 2016, in a Yahoo! Sports Canada article after his retirement from semi-professional hockey. He has spoken about the impact that Brendan Burke coming out had on him. The two spoke almost daily leading up to Brendan's death.

==== 2010s and efforts to increase inclusion ====
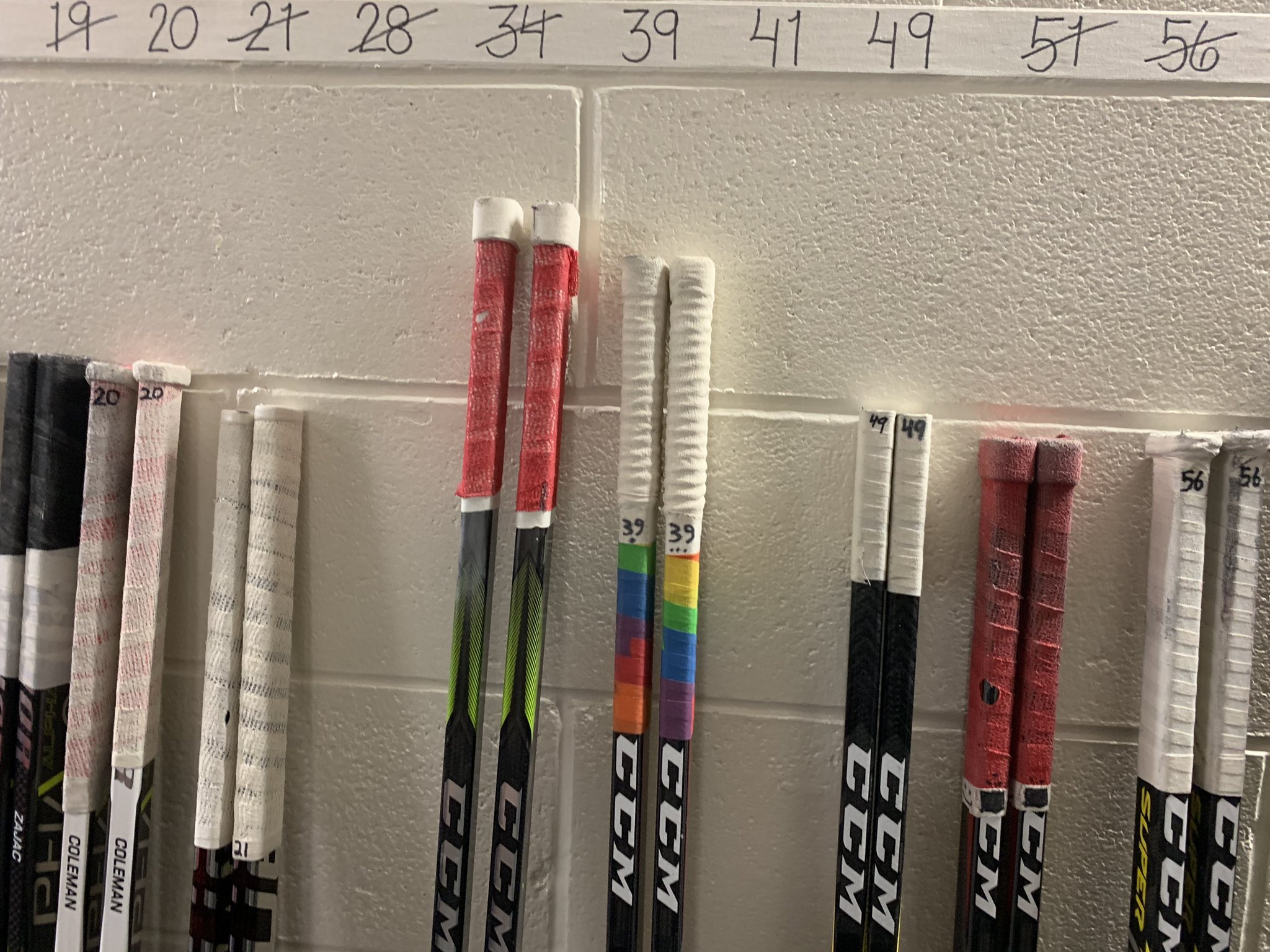
A photo of Kurtis Gabriel's stick with Pride Tape on it during the 2018–19 season.

The first Pride Night in the NHL was held on March 30, 2011, when the San Jose Sharks hosted the Dallas Stars. In 2013, more NHL teams introduced Pride Nights that often included players wearing Pride-themed jerseys. In 2014, the University of Alberta Institute for Sexual Minority Studies and Services launched a Kickstarter to fund Pride Tape, a hockey tape printed in rainbow stripes instead of the usual black or white. The Edmonton Oilers were the first team to use it on the ice. Teams integrated the Pride Tape into warmups on Pride Nights by wrapping it around their sticks or gear.

In April 2016, Andrew Shaw called a referee a homophobic slur. The NHL suspended him for one game and fined him $5,000. Shaw later apologized. In May 2017, for the same offense, Ryan Getzlaf was fined $10,000 but not suspended. He also apologized. In September 2017, the NHL and the National Hockey League Players' Association (NHLPA), along with 17 other hockey organizations, released the league's Declarations of Principles. The eighth principle reads:

All hockey programs should provide a safe, positive and inclusive environment for players and families regardless of race, color, religion, national origin, gender, age, disability, sexual orientation and socio-economic status. Simply put, hockey is for everyone.

This became part of the NHL's long-running "Hockey Is For Everyone" campaign. Soon after, in December 2017, the NHL hired Kim Davis as Executive Vice President of Social Impact, Growth Initiatives & Legislative Affairs, with a particular impact on improving diversity within the league.

By the 2017–18 season, all 31 NHL teams were hosting a Pride Night, with players often using rainbow-colored tape on their ice hockey sticks. On February 25, 2019, Kurtis Gabriel of the New Jersey Devils became the first NHL player to play a game while using Pride Tape and continue to use it past Pride Night.

==== 2020s ====
On November 5, 2020, NHL agent Bayne Pettinger came out as gay. He was congratulated by prominent players including Sidney Crosby and Connor McDavid.

In 2021, Canadian Luke Prokop, who was drafted by the Nashville Predators in the 2020 NHL entry draft, became the first active player signed to a National Hockey League contract to come out as gay. Prokop has not yet played in an NHL game. On November 17, 2023, Prokop became the first openly gay player in the American Hockey League's history, by making his first appearance in a game as a player for the Milwaukee Admirals.

In 2022 or 2023, Seattle Kraken trainer Justin Rogers became the first known openly gay support staff in the NHL.

The NHL released its first inclusion and diversity report in 2022. The self-reported data showed that among all NHL employees, including players and other staff, 93.14% were straight; 1.52% were bisexual; 1.12% were gay; 0.81% were lesbian; 0.40% selected "Other, including Queer/Asexual/Pansexual"; and 3% selected "Prefer not to answer."

==== 2023 Pride Tape ban and repeal ====
By the 2022–23 season, roughly half of all NHL teams had players wear rainbow-themed jerseys during warmups on Pride Nights. In that season, six players refused to wear Pride jerseys or use Pride Tape during Pride Night. Initially, this was seen as a safety decision by Russian players who did not want to face prosecution for promoting homosexuality according to Russian anti-LGBTQ law. However, several non-Russian players also refused to wear the jerseys, some of whom claimed it was for religious reasons.

In the summer of 2023, the NHL banned teams from using themed jerseys, including Pride jerseys on Pride Nights, during warmups or games, claiming it was a "distraction." In October, the NHL expanded the ban to include Pride Tape. Many players spoke out publicly against the ban, including Connor McDavid. In a social media post, Luke Prokop said, "Pride nights are an essential step towards fostering greater acceptance and understanding in hockey." On October 21, 2023, Travis Dermott used Pride Tape on his stick in defiance of the ban during a game between the Arizona Coyotes and Anaheim Ducks. Due to pressure from fans, players, and advocacy organizations, the NHL reversed course. The NHLPA announced on October 24, 2023, that the NHL had repealed the Pride Tape ban.

=== Pride Nights ===
The celebration of Pride Nights has been left up to individual teams, and many continue to hold them. Some teams continue to use Pride Tape on their sticks during warmups, with the choice left up to each player. The jersey ban remains in place. Some teams auction Pride jerseys instead of wearing them on the ice.

On August 28, 2026, the Dallas Stars announced they would not be hosting a Pride Night for the first time in five years.

=== Heated Rivalry and impact ===
The television show Heated Rivalry was released in late 2025. It portrayed a relationship between fictional gay and bisexual professional men's ice hockey players. It had immediate impact on cultural interest in hockey and the acceptance of homosexuality in the sport.

The show inspired former hockey player Jesse Kortuem to come out in January 2026. The Minnesotan left hockey at 17 because he could not see how to reconcile his sexuality with his athletic career.

The popularity of the show has resulted in increased ticket sales for some NHL teams, but some have expressed concern that acceptance of the fictional characters in the show is not reflected in acceptance of real players. LGBTQ+ advocate and athlete Mark Tewksbury has stated that current NHL players have reached out to him for helping coming out, but that it always fell through. One player cancelled a press conference the night before. Heated Rivalry lead actor Hudson Williams has stated that players in the NHL reached out to him after the show premiere. Author Rachel Reid had similar experiences.

The success of Heated Rivalry allowed a documentary about Luke Prokop's coming out journey, The Hockey Player, to be released in late June 2026. The documentary was struggling to attract and retain funding until funders saw an opportunity in the sudden popularity of LGBTQ+ players in ice hockey. At the time, he remained the only out professional men's ice hockey player in North America.

=== Current players and staff ===
In 2026, Luke Prokop remains the only active player signed to an NHL contract who is openly out as gay. Prokop has not yet played in an NHL game.

Bayne Pettinger remains the only openly gay NHL agent.

Seattle Kraken head trainer Justin Rogers remains the only known openly gay support staff in the NHL.

== LGBTQ hockey organizations and leagues ==
=== Advocacy organizations ===
You Can Play began in 2012 and has partnered with the NHL and NHLPA.

In January 2022, Brock McGillis announced the launch of Alphabet Sports Collective, an organization to support LGBTQ+ people in hockey.

=== LGBTQ+ leagues and teams ===
==== North America ====
- In 1985, the Los Angeles Blades became the first gay hockey team in the United States.
- The New York City Gay Hockey Association was organized in 1999.
- Coachella Valley Pride Hockey
- San Francisco Earthquakes
- Seattle Pride Hockey Association
- Team Trans

== In media and popular culture ==
The Canadian drama film Breakfast with Scot, about a gay retired hockey player, was authorized by the Toronto Maple Leafs to use the team's real name and logo in the film, making it the first gay-themed film ever to receive this type of approval from a professional sports league.

Check, Please! is a 2013 webcomic written and illustrated by Ngozi Ukazu. It follows vlogger and figure skater-turned-ice hockey player Eric "Bitty" Bittle as he deals with hockey culture in college, as well as his identity as a gay man.

The Game Changers series by Rachel Reid is series of romance novels about fictional professional hockey players who deal with being closeted. LGBTQ hockey leagues and teams have seen an increase in players since the release of television adaptation Heated Rivalry.

== List of players ==
These are lists of openly lesbian, gay, bisexual, or pansexual players as well as those who identify as belonging to the broader queer community.

=== Men ===
Name	Lifetime	Country	Highest league	Sexual orientation
Peter Karlsson	b. 1966–1995	Sweden	HockeyAllsvenskan	Gay
Brendan Burke	1988–2010	United States	High school varsity	Gay
Brock McGillis	b. 1983	Canada	OHL	Gay
Jon Lee-Olsen	1992	Denmark	Metal Ligaen	Gay
Janne Puhakka	1995–2024	Finland	Liiga	Gay
Zach Sullivan	b. 1994	United Kingdom	EIHL	Bisexual
Brock Weston	b. 1995	Canada	NCAA Division III	Gay
Luke Prokop	b. 2002	Canada	AHL	Gay

=== Women ===
Name	Lifetime	Country	Sport	Sexual orientation and/or gender identity
Caroline Ouellette	b. 1979	Canada	Ice hockey	Lesbian
Julie Chu	b. 1982	United States	Ice hockey	Lesbian
Marie-Philip Poulin	b. 1991	Canada	Ice hockey	Lesbian
Laura Stacey	b. 1994	Canada	Ice hockey	Lesbian
Erin Ambrose	b. 1994	Canada	Ice hockey	Lesbian
Gillian Apps	b. 1983	Canada	Ice hockey	Lesbian
Ebba Berglund	b. 1998	Sweden	Ice hockey	Lesbian
Nicole Bonamino	b. 1991	Italy	Ice hockey	Lesbian
Caitlin Cahow	b. 1985	United States	Ice hockey	Lesbian
Alex Carpenter	b. 1994	United States	Ice hockey	Lesbian
Emily Clark	b. 1995	Canada	Ice hockey	Lesbian
Mélodie Daoust	b. 1992	Canada	Ice hockey	Lesbian
Nancy Drolet	b. 1973	Canada	Ice hockey	Lesbian
Meghan Duggan	b. 1987	United States	Ice hockey	Lesbian
Kendra Fisher	b. 1979	Canada	Ice hockey, Inline hockey	Lesbian
Jayna Hefford	b. 1977	Canada	Ice hockey	Lesbian
Erika Holst	b. 1979	Sweden	Ice hockey	Lesbian
Angela James	b. 1964	Canada	Ice hockey	Lesbian
Brianne Jenner	b.1991	Canada	Ice hockey	Lesbian
Kathleen Kauth	b. 1979	United States	Ice hockey	Lesbian
Anna Kjellbin	b. 1994	Sweden	Ice hockey	Lesbian
Hilary Knight	b. 1989	United States	Ice Hockey	Queer
Charline Labonté	b. 1982	Canada	Ice hockey	Lesbian
Ylva Lindberg	b. 1976	Sweden	Ice hockey	Lesbian
Jamie Lee Rattray	b. 1992	Canada	Ice hockey	Lesbian
Jill Saulnier	b. 1992	Canada	Ice hockey	Lesbian
Ronja Savolainen	b. 1997	Finland	Ice hockey	Lesbian
Sarah Vaillancourt	b. 1985	Canada	Ice hockey	Lesbian
Micah Zandee-Hart	b. 1997	Canada	Ice hockey	Lesbian

== See also ==
- Transgender people in ice hockey
- Homosexuality in modern sports
- List of LGBT Olympians
- List of LGBT Winter Olympians
- Coming out
