= Pundit Arena =

Irish sports website

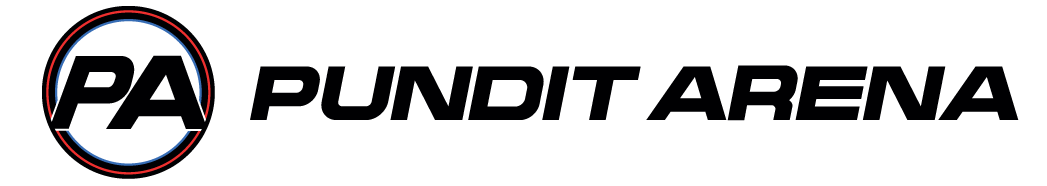
- Website type: Sports
- Available in: English
- Website: punditarena.com
- Current status: Active

Pundit Arena (styled as PUNDIT ARENA) with url punditarena.com, is an Irish sports website focusing on association football, rugby union, gaelic sports, mixed martial arts and golf. It was co-founded by University College Cork graduates, Richard Barrett and Ross O'Dwyer. In June 2019 the website was announced as the exclusive broadcaster of the LGBT+ inclusive Dublin 2019 edition of the Union Cup rugby tournament.
