= International Gay Bowling Organization =

The International Gay Bowling Organization (IGBO) represents over 5000 lesbian, gay, bisexual, and transgender (LGBT) members from Australia, Canada, Germany, New Zealand, United Kingdom and United States. The organization was established in 1980 to provide a collaborative sporting group within the LGBT community. The organization embraces the "ideals of Unity, Fellowship and Communication". By 2019, the group had more than 8,000 members.

== History ==
LGBT sports leagues began emerging in the United States in the 1970s, primarily as a social outlet for men and women who wished to fraternize with other homosexual amateur athletes in a non-bar atmosphere.

In 1989, the national tournament was held in Cincinnati, Ohio, and featured 770 competitors. Stand-up comedian Judy Tenuta performed during the first night of the event.

Over the past 30 years, the IGBO has dealt with topical issues such as increasing participation by women, memorializing members who have succumbed to AIDS, raising funds for charitable organizations and the ongoing pursuit of increasing membership worldwide.

== Structure ==
IGBO is a membership-based organization of member leagues, tournaments and individuals (associates). Leagues and tournaments join IGBO to network and promote their events across the organization. Individuals can become a part of IGBO by joining a member league or individually as an associate member.

IGBO conducts business through a board of elected volunteers and a series of committees. Twice annually, in November and May, IGBO conducts a conference to gather representatives from member leagues and tournaments and conduct business.

=== Host cities for past conferences ===
Host city	Annual Conference	Mid-Year Conference
San Antonio, Texas, US	2019	
Reno, Nevada, US	2024	2018
Denver, Colorado, US	2000, 2007, 2018*, 2026	
Oklahoma City, Oklahoma, US	1994, 2009	2007, 2017
Ft. Lauderdale, Florida, US	2002, 2017	
San Francisco, California, US		1987, 2016
Albuquerque, New Mexico, US	2016	
Pittsburgh, Pennsylvania, US		2015
Omaha, Nebraska, US	2015	
Jacksonville, Florida, US	2028	2014
Tucson, Arizona, US	2014	1994
Dallas/Fort Worth, Texas, US	1982, 1992	1985, 1989, 2013
Tampa, Florida, US	2013	1991
Seattle, Washington, US	1984, 2023	2012
New York City, New York, US	2012 (with Jersey City, NJ)	
Rochester, New York, US	2022	2011
Toronto, Ontario, CAN	1991, 2011	1997
Washington, DC, US	1988, 1999	2010
Columbus, Ohio, US	2001, 2010	
Syracuse, New York, US		2009
San Diego, California, US		2003, 2008
Atlanta, Georgia, US	1993, 2008	
Detroit, Michigan, US		1992, 2006
Kansas City, Missouri, US	2006, 2027	
Calgary, Alberta, CAN		2005
Milwaukee, Wisconsin, US	2005	1981, 1982, 1983, 1984, 1990
Fort Worth, Texas, US		2004
St. Louis, Missouri, US	2004	
Phoenix, Arizona, US	2003	
Auckland, New Zealand		2002
Houston, Texas, US	1981	2001
Minneapolis, Minnesota, US		2000
Honolulu, Hawaii, US		1999
Los Angeles, California, US	1990	1998
Cleveland, Ohio, US	1998	
Nashville, Tennessee, US	1997	
Orlando, Florida, US		1996
Philadelphia, Pennsylvania, US	1996	
Lexington, Kentucky, US		1995
Vancouver, British Columbia, CAN	1995	
San Antonio, Texas, US	2019	1993
Cincinnati, Ohio, US	1989	1986
Miami, Florida, US		1988
New Orleans, Louisiana, US	1987	
Las Vegas, Nevada, US	1986, 2021, 2025	
Louisville, Kentucky, US	1985	
Chicago, Illinois, US	1983	
