= Newcastle Ravens =

English rugby union club, based in Newcastle-upon-Tyne

(England) Newcastle Ravens
- Full name: Newcastle Ravens Rugby Football Club
- Union: Northumberland RFU
- Founded: 2006; 20 years ago by Dave Burke
- Location: Newcastle upon Tyne, Tyne and Wear, England
- Ground: Percy Park
- Chairman: Chris Buckton

Official website
- www.newcastleravens.co.uk

Newcastle Ravens Rugby Football Club is a rugby union team located in Newcastle upon Tyne, England.

== History ==
The team was organised to help encourage gay people to take part in the sport. The team was founded on 1 May 2006 by Dave Burke who was the first chairman and captain, and it is run by a committee of eight elected members. The Ravens were admitted as members of the International Gay Rugby Association and Board in 2006. The Ravens played at Novocastrians Rugby Football Club from 2006 to 2014, they have resided at Percy Park since 2014.

== Union Cup ==
The Ravens sent players to the 2007 Union Cup tournament in Copenhagen and played as part of the Cardiff Lions team. The combined squad recorded victories over NOP Amsterdam Rugby Club (35–5), Malmö Devilants (30–5 and 35–0) and the Caledonian Thebans RFC (5–25), drawing with the Emerald Warriors 10–10 on the way. The squad missed out in a tense final in Copenhagen to the Emerald Warriors RFC (10–5) after extra time. In May 2009 the club participated in the Union Cup tournament in London, hosted by the Kings Cross Steelers. In 2013 the Club entered the competition which was held in Bristol and also entered again in 2015, travelling to Brussels and again in 2017 at the tournament which was held in Madrid. The 2019 tournament was held in Dublin and the Ravens were proud to win the Union Plate Trophy beating Le Gaillard from Paris in the Final 35 – 7

== Newcastle Falcons Corporate Rugby ==
The club participated in the 2007 Newcastle Falcons Corporate Rugby Tournament. The Ravens had Falcons and England rugby team player Mathew Tait in their squad for the event, during which they achieved a draw and two losses.

== Caledonian Thebans Rugby Clinic ==
The Ravens attended the Caledonian Thebans RFC rugby clinic in 2006, 2007 and 2008. The 2007 tournament was capped with a mini 7s tournament and 15s game. The Ravens achieved a 3–1 win over the Thebans and a 0–0 draw with the Cardiff Lions. The 2008 and 2009 clinics finished with a 10s tournament, both of which were won by the Ravens.

== The Bingham Cup ==
The Ravens teamed up with the Caledonian Thebans RFC to attend the 2008 Mark Kendall Bingham Memorial Tournament in Dublin under the joint team name of Northern Stags. The Stags entered the tournament at the Shield level but were promoted to the Bowl where they finished as Quarter Finalists. The Newcastle Ravens entered their own team into the Bingham Cup 2012 in Manchester where they won the Hoagland Cup. The Ravens entered a team into the 2018 Amsterdam tournament and walked away with the Alice Hoagland shield. The Ravens were drawn against Kings Cross Steelers 3rd, Northampton Outlaws and Stockholm Berserkers in the second tier pool. Northampton Outlaws was the opening match, followed by Stockholm. Both were evenly matched close games of rugby. Both resulted in defeat on the first day. Day two, Kingscross Steelers were the final group opponents. Steelers scored a penalty early on in the game which motivated the Londoner's support. However, the Ravens responded with a second half try, silencing the Londoner's support. The game finished 5 v 3 to the Ravens.

== The Hadrian Cup ==
The club hosts an annual tournament, the Hadrian Cup, during February. The Hadrian Cup was named after the Roman Emperor Hadrian, who was known to have had a homosexual lover and who also built the famous Hadrian's Wall which stretches across England from Newcastle to Carlisle. The first tournament welcomed teams from Cardiff, Edinburgh, Manchester and Belfast. The tournament was changed to a 10's format in 2017 and the competition which was held in February 2018 was won for the second year running by the Emerald Warriors from Dublin. Other teams entered from Edinburgh, Glasgow, Reading, Brighton, Liverpool, Leeds and of course Newcastle. The tournament in 2019 was another huge success with 11 teams attending and it was won by the Ravens.

== Northumberland League ==
The club started competing in the Northumberland League in the 2013/14 season.

== Northern IGR League ==
International Gay Rugby introduced a Northern League for the 2017/18 Season with 4 teams taking part. Liverpool Tritons, Leeds Hunters, Manchester Village Spartans and of course Newcastle Ravens. The Ravens were League Champions in this inaugural year. in 2018 / 19 the number of teams increased to 7 and the Ravens were successful in retaining the league championship for a second year winning 12 out of 12 of their games.

== Enfys 7s ==
The Ravens entered the Enfys 7s competition in Cardiff in August 2018 and were winners in the 2nd tier bringing home the Plate Trophy.

== Ladies Team ==
In 2018 the Ravens became the first IGR Club in the UK to form a ladies team. Whilst this is still developing the ladies have entered a couple of Touch Rugby Tournaments so far.

== See also ==
- LGBT community
