= Jozi Cats =

- Founded: 2015
- Location: Johannesburg, South Africa

Jozi Cats is a South African gay and inclusive rugby club founded in 2015 and based in Johannesburg. The club is Africa's first gay and inclusive rugby club.

== History ==
The club was founded in 2015. During 2016 the club launched a recruitment campaign challenging homophobic slurs and stereotypes. The campaign, which attracted international attention, features posters of team members accompanied by words such as "queen", "fairy" and "pansy".

The club has toured towns and cities across South Africa such as Bloemfontein, Port Elizabeth, Cape Town and Stellenbosch spreading the message of tolerance and inclusiveness in sport.

In April 2017, after gaining the sponsorship of Exclusive Books, the largest book-selling chain in South Africa the Jozi Cats became the first non-European club invited to participate in the biennial Union Cup which was held in Madrid.

== Media Launch ==
With a small number of members, and difficulty the recruiting sponsors or number of members needed to be taken seriously as a rugby club, then-Chairman Teveshan Kuni approached then head-of Havas Public Relations Chris Verrijdt to see if some media attention could be generated to help bolster numbers. Verrijdt created the "Rugby That's So Gay!" campaign that focused on the same ideals the team were founded upon; an all-inclusive rugby team that uniquely addressed the issue of homophobia by way of sports.

The media campaign, which consisted of seven images of current players accompanied by a homophobic slur, and a group image announcing the name of the campaign was a success - grabbing the attention of over 315 million people in over 126 countries and was picked up by many international news outlets including Australia, United States of America, and a large amount of support via social media.
