= Manchester Village Spartans RUFC =

English rugby union club, based in Sale, Greater Manchester

(England) Manchester Village Spartans RUFC
- Manchester Village Spartans RUFC Logo
- Union: Cheshire RFU
- Founded: 1998; 28 years ago
- Location: Sale, Trafford, England
- Ground: Sale Sports Club
- Chairman: Christian Davis
- President: Ben Dawson
- Director of Rugby: Ale Lewis (Director of Rugby); Michael Clarke (Director of Touch Rugby)
- Coach(es): Ale Lewis (Union Coach); Christian Davis (Union Coach); Gareth Longley (Union Coach); Gregg Cropper (Touch Coach); Sarah Bellow (Touch Coach)
- Captain(s): George Campbell & Matt Brown (Union Club Captain); Ben Walker (Touch Club Captain)
- League(s): North West Intermediate Rugby Union League; IGR North; IGR Northern Touch Series

Official website
- villagespartans.co.uk

The Manchester Village Spartans RUFC is Manchester's gay and inclusive rugby union football team based at Sale Sports Club, Manchester.

The club welcomes players at all skill levels who do and do not identify as LGBT, and has both Rugby Union and Touch Rugby teams.

The club is a full and founding member of International Gay Rugby Association and Board (IGRAB), and in 2012 it hosted the Bingham Cup, the international gay and inclusive rugby championship.

== History ==
The Village Spartans were founded in 1998 in Manchester, UK, becoming the second gay and inclusive team in the United Kingdom, after the Kings Cross Steelers in 1995. This was in response to the hostile environment encountered by players at the time trying to participate within non-inclusive teams, and sought to establish a gay and inclusive team to counter this.

In August 1999, the Village Spartans and Kings Cross Steelers played the first match between two gay and inclusive rugby clubs in the United Kingdom. The Steelers won 22-15. This initial match evolved into the annual Pioneers Cup, which both the Spartans and Steelers host on a rotating basis. As both clubs have expanded multiple squads from both clubs compete in matches of similar skilled sides.

In 2002 the club changed its club colours to the Rainbow Flag of the LGBT Community, colours which have been retained throughout various kit designs ever since.

In 2012 the Spartans hosted the Bingham Cup, an international tournament for gay and inclusive teams from over a dozen countries, often termed the ‘gay rugby world cup’ for its scale.

In 2017 the Spartans bid for the 2019 Union Cup, a Pan-European gay and inclusive rugby tournament, losing out to the Emerald Warriors RFC from Dublin, Ireland.

2017 marked the first time the Spartans sent three teams to an international competition, with the 3rd (3XV) team winning the bronze bowl.

In 2017 the Spartans launched a full-time Touch Rugby programme, representing the world's first inclusive touch rugby club, and the first-time all people were able to join the club as players, regardless of sex or gender.

As of 2023 the Touch programme play in the newly founded IGR Touch series, local leagues, the yearly Pride in Touch Tournament, and the England Touch Association National Touch Series.

In 2019 the Spartans sent two teams to the pan-European gay and inclusive rugby tournament, the Union Cup. The 1st team made it to the final of the Union Cup division, losing to the Kings Cross Steelers 1st team, and placing as Union Cup runners up, and second in the tournament overall. The Spartans 2nd team made it to the final of the Challenger Cup division, winning the final and the Challenger Cup.

In 2019 the Spartans celebrated their 20th anniversary, with a series of birthday projects including the creation of a photographic celebration of inclusive rugby, 'Portraits of Pride' and culminating in a fundraising gala event in Manchester attended by players from across the global inclusive rugby game, rugby union celebrities and representatives of government and sporting agencies, recognising the club's contribution to the promotion and growth of inclusive rugby and marking the Manchester Village Spartans RUFC as the second oldest Gay and Inclusive rugby club in the world, still in existence today.

In 2022, the first IGR Touch Series took place in both the North and South with 7 teams taking part in the North. The Spartans Touch placed 1st for the overall series followed by Chester Centurions then Leeds Hunters.

At present, the club has the following teams:

- Manchester Village Spartans 1XV – North West Intermediate League Division 4 South
- Manchester Village Spartans 2XV – IGR North - League 1
- Manchester Village Spartans 3XV - IGR North - League 2
- Manchester Village Spartans Touch Team - IGR Northern Touch Series

The Spartans club house is the Sale Sports Club, based in Sale, Trafford.

== Name and kit ==
The Spartans take their name from the Spartans of Ancient Greece, whose warrior culture encouraged and celebrated male sexual and romantic love as a form of camaraderie and strength.

Since 2002 the club colours have been the rainbow flag of the LGBT community, and have been retained in various kit redesigns over the years. The Spartans are unique as the only UK gay and inclusive team to prominently feature the rainbow flag on their kit.

The logo shows a Spartan helmet with a rainbow plume, and the club has the moto Unione Fortior which means Strength in Union.

== Charitable Status ==
The Manchester Village Spartans have community amateur sports club (CASC) status, Scheme Number CH10207, a status different from charity status but conveying some of the same benefits.

== Results in Leagues and Tournaments ==
=== 2021 / 22 ===
Touch Team IGR Northern Touch Series - 1st Place Pride in Touch Tournament - 3rd out of 8

=== 2018 / 19 ===
1XV - Union Cup - Union Division - (2nd place) Union Cup Runners Up
2XV - Union Cup - Challenger Division - (1st place) Challenger Cup Winners
1XV - North West Intermediate League - Div 3 South
2XV - IGR North League - 4th out of 7

=== 2017 / 18 ===
1XV - North West Intermediate League – Div 3 South (10th Place)
2XV - North West Intermediate League – Div 5 East (10th Place)
1XV – Bingham Cup – Bingham Division - 12th out of 24
2XV – Bingham Cup – Challenger Division - 22nd out of 22

=== 2016 / 17 ===
1XV North West Intermediate League – Div 3 South (10th Place)
2XV North West Intermediate League – Div 5 East (10th Place)
1XV Union Cup – Cup – Semi Final
2XV Union Cup – Plate - Placed 10th
3XV Union Cup – Bowl – Bronze

=== 2015 / 16 ===
1XV North West Intermediate League – Div 4 East (2nd Place, promoted)

=== 2013 / 14 ===
1XV North West Intermediate League – Div 5E (4th Place)
2XV Birmingham Touch Tournament – (2nd Place)
1XV Bingham Cup - Sydney

=== 2012 / 13 ===
1XV North West Intermediate League – Div 5E (3rd Place)
1XV Hadrian's Cup – Newcastle, UK (2nd Place)
1XV Friendly Tour – Madrid, Spain (Friendly)
2XV Union Cup – Bristol, UK (3rd place)

=== 2011 / 12 ===
1XV North West Intermediate League – Div 5E (6th Place)
1XV Bingham Cup – Manchester, UK
2XV Bingham Cup – Manchester, UK
3XV Bingham Cup – Manchester, UK

=== 2010 / 11 ===
1XV North West Intermediate League – Div 5E (5th Place)
1XV Union Cup – Amsterdam, Netherlands
1XV Hadrian's Cup - Newcastle, UK (2nd)

=== 2009 / 10 ===
1XV North West Intermediate League – Div 5E (3rd Place)
1XV Bingham Cup – Minneapolis, USA
1XV Hadrian's Cup - Newcastle, UK

=== 2008 / 09 ===
1XV North West Intermediate League – Div 4E (14th Place)
1XV Union Cup – London, UK
1XV Hadrian's Cup - Newcastle, UK

=== 2007 / 08 ===
1XV North West Intermediate League – Div 5S (6th Place)
1XV Bingham Cup – Dublin, Ireland
2XV Bingham Cup – Dublin, Ireland
1XV Hadrian's Cup - Newcastle, UK (1st)

=== 2006 / 07 ===
1XV North West Intermediate League – Div 5E (13th Place)
1XV Friendly Tour – Cologne, Germany (Friendly)

=== 2005 / 06 ===
1XV North West Intermediate League – Div 5S (12th Place)
1XV Bingham Cup – New York, USA

=== 2004 / 05 ===
1XV Union Cup, Montpelier, France

=== 2003 / 04 ===
1XV Bingham Cup – London, UK

=== 2002 / 03 ===
1XV Bingham Cup – San Francisco, USA

=== 2001 / 02 ===
1XV – Washington Invitational, Washington DC, USA
