= Luke Prokop =

Canadian ice hockey player (born 2002)

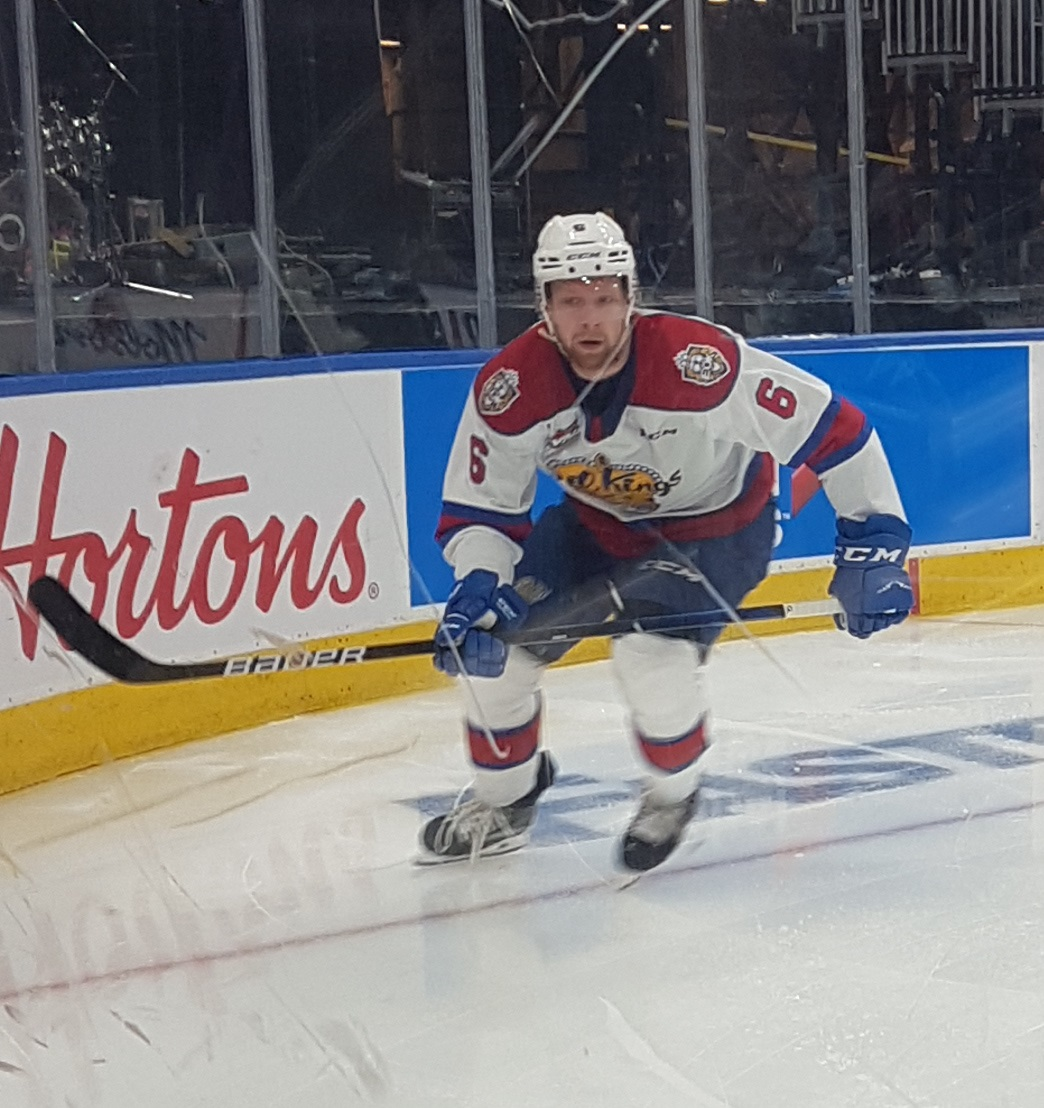
- Prokop with the Edmonton Oil Kings in 2022
- Born: May 6, 2002 (age 24) Edmonton, Alberta, Canada
- Height: 6 ft 5 in (196 cm)
- Weight: 224 lb (102 kg; 16 st 0 lb)
- Position: Defence
- Shoots: Right
- ECHL AHL team Former teams: South Carolina Stingrays; Milwaukee Admirals; Bakersfield Condors
- NHL draft: 73rd overall, 2020; Nashville Predators
- Playing career: 2022–present

Luke Prokop (born May 6, 2002) is a Canadian professional ice hockey defenceman who is currently under contract with the South Carolina Stingrays of the ECHL. He most recently played for the Bakersfield Condors of the American Hockey League (AHL). He was selected by the Nashville Predators, 73rd overall, in the 2020 NHL entry draft. In 2021, Prokop came out as gay, becoming the first player under contract with an NHL team to do so.

== Playing career ==
Prokop is from Edmonton, Alberta. He became a fan of Shea Weber, a right-handed defenceman, when he watched Weber playing ice hockey at the 2010 Winter Olympics for the Canadian men's national ice hockey team. Prokop became a fan of Weber's team, the Nashville Predators of the National Hockey League (NHL), and began wearing jersey number 6 in his honour.

Prokop attended the Pursuit of Excellence Hockey Academy in Kelowna, British Columbia, playing in the Canadian Sport School Hockey League (CSSHL). The Calgary Hitmen of the Western Hockey League (WHL) selected Prokop with their first round selection, the seventh overall, of the 2017 WHL Bantam Draft.. Prokop would spend one more season in the CSSHL with the Northern Alberta Xtreme (NAX) in Devon, Alberta. He played for Canada's national under-18 ice hockey team in the 2018 IIHF World U18 Championships..

The Predators selected Prokop in the third round, with the 73rd overall selection, of the 2020 NHL entry draft. In December 2020, he signed a three-year entry-level contract with the Predators, and spent the 2020–21 season with Calgary.

The Hitmen traded Prokop to the Edmonton Oil Kings on October 13, 2021. He opened the 2022–23 season with the Norfolk Admirals of the ECHL. On October 25, 2022, the Seattle Thunderbirds traded three conditional WHL draft picks to Edmonton for Prokop.

Prokop began the 2023–24 season with the Atlanta Gladiators of the ECHL. He scored five points in nine games with the Gladiators before being called up to their AHL affiliate team, the Milwaukee Admirals. On November 17, 2023, he became the first openly gay individual to play in the American Hockey League, a significant milestone for LGBT player representation in men's professional hockey. He went on to play the majority of the season in the ECHL, where he finished as Atlanta's top-scoring defenceman and 6th best overall with 28 points over 55 games.

In the 2024–25 season, Prokop appeared in 31 games with the Admirals and scored 4 points. At the conclusion of his entry-level contract with the Predators, Prokop was released as a free agent. On August 11, 2025, he was signed to a one-year contract with the Bakersfield Condors, the AHL affiliate of the Edmonton Oilers, for the 2025-26 season.

Prior to the 2026-27 season, Prokop signed with the South Carolina Stingrays of the ECHL, along with his brother Josh.

== Personal life ==
During his childhood, playing hockey was his main extracurricular focus. At 12–13 years old, he started to realize that he was a "good hockey player" and decided he wanted to make a career out of it. His older brother, Josh, is also an ice hockey player. The Calgary Hitmen signed Josh in September 2018. They both spent time playing with Calgary, before Luke was traded to the Edmonton Oil Kings. His parents own a golf course in Edmonton, Alberta (where Prokop is from) where he frequently visits.

On July 19, 2021, Prokop came out as gay, becoming the first player under contract with an NHL team to do so. On November 17, 2023, Prokop became the first openly gay player in the American Hockey League's history, by making his first appearance in a game as a player for the Milwaukee Admirals.

On June 29, 2026, a documentary about his life, career, and journey titled The Hockey Player was released in the United States and Canada. The success of fictional television show Heated Rivalry allowed The Hockey Player to be released. The documentary was struggling to attract and retain funding until funders saw an opportunity in the sudden popularity of LGBTQ+ players in ice hockey. At the time, he remained the only out professional men's ice hockey player in North America.

== Career statistics ==
=== Regular season and playoffs ===
			Regular season					Playoffs
Season	Team	League	GP	G	A	Pts	PIM	GP	G	A	Pts	PIM
2017–18	Calgary Hitmen	WHL	14	0	2	2	6	—	—	—	—	—
2018–19	Calgary Hitmen	WHL	62	1	9	10	12	11	0	4	4	0
2019–20	Calgary Hitmen	WHL	59	4	19	23	30	—	—	—	—	—
2020–21	Calgary Hitmen	WHL	15	2	4	6	14	—	—	—	—	—
2021–22	Calgary Hitmen	WHL	3	1	1	2	4	—	—	—	—	—
2021–22	Edmonton Oil Kings	WHL	55	10	23	33	34	19	4	12	16	4
2022–23	Norfolk Admirals	ECHL	8	1	0	1	6	—	—	—	—	—
2022–23	Seattle Thunderbirds	WHL	43	4	17	21	20	19	1	4	5	6
2023–24	Atlanta Gladiators	ECHL	55	5	23	28	16	—	—	—	—	—
2023–24	Milwaukee Admirals	AHL	9	0	2	2	6	—	—	—	—	—
2024–25	Milwaukee Admirals	AHL	31	1	3	4	6	—	—	—	—	—
2025–26	Bakersfield Condors	AHL	42	3	8	11	20	—	—	—	—	—
AHL totals			82	4	13	17	32	—	—	—	—	—

=== International ===
Year	Team	Event	Result	GP	G	A	Pts	PIM
2018	Canada White	U17	6th	5	0	1	1	0
Junior totals				5	0	1	1	0

== Awards and achievements ==
Award	Year	Ref
WHL
Ed Chynoweth Cup	2022, 2023	

== See also ==
- LGBTQ people in ice hockey
