= Brock McGillis =

Canadian ice hockey goaltender and LGBT activist

- Born: October 1, 1983 (age 42) Coniston, Ontario, Canada
- Height: 6 ft 0 in (183 cm)
- Weight: 183 lb (83 kg; 13 st 1 lb)
- Position: Goaltender
- Caught: Right
- Played for: Concordia Stingers; Duindam Wolves Den Haag; Kalamazoo Wings; Windsor Spitfires; Sault Ste. Marie Greyhounds
- Playing career: 2001–2010
- Website: brockmcgillis.com

Brock McGillis (born October 1, 1983) is a Canadian former ice hockey goaltender and LGBT+ advocate. He was among the first professional male hockey players to come out as gay.

== Playing career ==
From 2001 to 2002, McGillis played in the Ontario Hockey League with the Windsor Spitfires and the Sault Ste. Marie Greyhounds. After playing for a season with the Kalamazoo Wings in the United Hockey League (UHL), he left North America to play in the Netherlands.

From 2009 to 2010, he played at Concordia University in Montréal.

== Coming Out and Activism ==
McGillis came out on November 3, 2016, in a Yahoo! Sports Canada article after his retirement from semi-professional hockey.

McGillis has spoken about the impact that Brendan Burke coming out had on him. The two spoke almost daily leading up to Brendan's death in February 2010. At the time, McGillis was not out. However, it became knowledge among his hockey community that he was gay. It cost him business and people refused to work with him. However, he also had support among the community he worked with. After the Pulse nightclub shooting in June 2016, he felt compelled to attend a charity event that his friend advised him to avoid because he might be targeted for his sexuality. He said:

“I was so fed up with hiding. I couldn’t keep hiding. I was just so exhausted and thought I’m not doing this any longer. And I told my friend that you’re not doing this alone. I need to be there. I need to start to fight for myself.”

Immediately after the event, he decided to come out.

McGillis has been an activist for LGBT+ issues with regard to North American ice hockey. In January 2022, he announced the launch of Alphabet Sports Collective, an organization to support LGBTQ+ people in hockey.

McGillis has also contributed a chapter to Bob McKenzie's book Everyday Hockey Heroes. He appeared in the book Proud To Play, featuring LGBTQ+ athletes in Canada. He graced the cover of and featured in the September/October 2018 issue of IN Magazine.

McGillis has also appeared on Canadian television, including CBC News program The National, CTV's Your Morning, ET Canada Pride, and the Global National newscast. He shared the stage with Richard Branson and Billy Porter at the 2019 New York City WorldPride.
