= Zander Murray =

Scottish footballer (born 1991)

Personal information
- Date of birth: 2 November 1991 (age 35)
- Place of birth: Scotland
- Position: Forward

Senior career*
Years	Team	Apps	(Gls)
–2016	Pumpherston		
2016–2018	Broxburn Athletic		
2018–2019	Pumpherston		
2019–2023	Gala Fairydean Rovers		(1)
2023	Bonnyrigg Rose	15	(1)
2023–2024	Gala Fairydean Rovers		
- * Club domestic league appearances and goals

Zander Murray (born 2 November 1991) is a Scottish retired footballer who played as a forward for Bonnyrigg Rose, Motherwell & Airdrieonians as a youth.

== Career ==
His youth football career began at Motherwell before moving to Airdrieonians.

Murray played for Pumpherston. In 2016, he signed for Broxburn Athletic. In 2018, he returned to Pumpherston. In 2019, he signed for Gala Fairydean Rovers. He scored more than 100 goals for the club, including a club record 26 goals in the 2021–22 campaign in a best-ever league finish, while also reaching the East of Scotland Qualifying Cup final.

In early 2023, he signed for Bonnyrigg Rose of Scottish League Two, making his debut for the club during a 2–1 loss to Annan Athletic.

Zander became the first Scottish openly gay player in the SPFL.

He has been an advocate in tackling homophobia within Football and in Wider Society. Receiving numerous accolades and awards in doing so.

His ambassador work in football has featured in two documentaries, "Out on the Pitch" with BBC & "Rylan: Homophobia, Football and me".

He works with schools and youth football clubs across Scotland in collaboration with the education charity Time for Inclusive Education, delivering a workshop on challenging homophobia in football.

== Personal life ==
Murray came out as gay in 2022, becoming the first Scottish footballer to do so. He has worked as a career advisor.
