= Union Cup =

The Union Cup is a biennial European, non-professional, gay rugby union tournament, bringing together teams and joint teams from all over Europe. It is held every odd-numbered year.

== History ==
=== Montpellier 2005 ===
The first edition was held in May 2005 in Montpellier, France. The participating teams were Les Artichauds, Manchester Village Spartans, Kings Cross Steelers, Emerald Warriors RFC, Cardiff Lions, Los Valents Montpellier, Les Gaillards, NOP Amsterdam (later became Amsterdam Lowlanders) and the competition was won by Les Artichauds over the Manchester Village Spartans.

=== Copenhagen 2007 ===
The second edition was held in Copenhagen, Denmark in May 2007; the XVs competition was won by the Kings Cross Steelers London, while the 7s tournament was won by the Emerald Warriors RFC Dublin over the Cardiff Lions with a 10–5 final score.

=== London 2009 ===
The third edition was held in London in 2009, with visiting teams from Amsterdam, Bristol, Cardiff, Copenhagen, Dublin, Edinburgh, Manchester, Montpellier, Newcastle, Paris and a Barbarians side; the XVs competition was won by the Kings Cross Steelers London in a hard-fought 3–0 match against the Manchester Village Spartans, the Xs tournament was won by the Cardiff Lions who beat the Kings Cross Steelers Xs team 29–7 in the final, and the 7s tournament was won by the Bristol Bisons RFC in a 12–7 final against Les Coqs Festifs Paris.

=== Amsterdam 2011 ===
The fourth edition was held in Amsterdam, Netherlands, hosted by the Amsterdam Lowlanders in June 2011 with visiting teams from Amsterdam, Bristol, Brussels, Dublin, Edinburgh, London, Lisbon, Lyon, Manchester, Montpellier and Paris. The XVs competition was won by the Kings Cross Steelers I London, over the Manchester Village Spartans and the Emerald Warriors RFC Dublin, while the Xs competition was won by the Los Valents Montpellier, over the Bristol Bisons RFC and the Kings Cross Steelers II.

A video was created by the students of a local art university, and generally the competition found good coverage on the media, both on TV and on newspapers.

=== Bristol 2013 ===
In July 2011, Bristol Bisons RFC were successful in their bid for the 2013 Union Cup over the Emerald Warriors RFC from Dublin, Ireland.

19 squads took part from 17 different teams. In the 10s tournament Birmingham Bulls, Dublin Emerald Warriors RFC 2nds, Lisbon Dark Horses, Montpellier Los Valents, Paris Coq Festifs. 15's teams, Amsterdam Lowlanders, Berlin Bruisers, Bristol Bisons RFC, Bruxelles Straffe Ketten, Cardiff Lions, Edinburgh Thebans, Dublin Emerald Warriors RFC 1st, London Kings Cross Steelers 1st XV, London Kings Cross Steelers 2nd XV, Lyon Les Rebelyons, Manchester Village Spartans, Newcastle Ravens, Northampton Outlaws RFC, Stockholm Berserkers RFC.

The Kings Cross Steelers won the Union Cup for the fourth time with a win over Dublin Emerald Warriors RFC

With 500+ participants from all over Europe this is the largest Union Cup thus far.

=== Brussels 2015 ===
In April 2013, 3 teams / cities expressed bids for the Union Cup 2015 tournament. Caledonian Thebans From Edinburgh, Straffe Ketten From Brussels, Los Valents de Montpellier RFC From Montpellier. At 11.15pm BST, on 25 May 2013, it was announced in Bristol's "The Vault" venue, that Brussels – Straffe Ketten was the chosen city – club to host the Union Cup 2015. This will be the first time the Union Cup has been staged in Belgium. 700 players, fans and officials traveled to Brussels in May 2015 for the competition. The competition was held from 21 to 23 May 2015, with opening and closing ceremonies being held at the Square near the Bozar in the centre of Brussels, and the tournament itself at the pitches of Forest Rugby Club in Bempt in the south-west of the city. Winners were: Cup: Kings Cross Steelers from London (24–3 against Manchester Spartans) Plate: Straffe Ketten from Brussels (8–7 against Caledonian Thebans from Edinburgh) Bowl: Cardiff Lions (7–0 against Kings Cross Steelers II)

=== Madrid 2017 ===
For 2017 3 cities ran for the organisation of the Union Cup. Dublin withdrew before the official bids had to be in. The decision between Madrid and Newcastle was made in Brussels on 23 May 2015 in favor of Madrid. The Madrid Titanes Club de Rugby will be the hosts.

The Jozi Cats, from Johannesburg, South Africa became the first non-European team to participate in the cup.

=== Dublin 2019 ===
For 2019 3 teams ran for the organisation of the Union Cup. The Manchester Village Spartans Manchester, The Cardiff Lions Cardiff and The Emerald Warriors Dublin, who won the bidding process after two attempts for the years 2013 and 2017. The tournament was broadcast by the Pundit Arena website.

Birmingham 2023

After a two-year pause due to the pandemic, the Union Cup was announced to take place in Birmingham, United Kingdom, and to be hosted by the City of Birmingham's Birmingham Bulls over the weekend of 27 – 30 April 2023.

Oslo 2025

The next Union Cup will take place in Oslo, Norway over the weekend of 30th May to 1st June 2025.

== Tournament Summary ==
List of Union Cup Winners and Runners Up
| Year & Host City | Cup Champions | Cup Runners Up | Plate or Xs Champions | Plate or Xs Runners Up | Bowl or 7s Champions | Bowl or 7s Runners Up |
|---|---|---|---|---|---|---|
| 2005 (France) Montpellier | (France) Les Artichauds | (England) Manchester Village Spartans | | | | |
| 2007 (Denmark) Copenhagen | (England) Kings Cross Steelers | | | | (Republic of Ireland) Emerald Warriors | (Wales) Cardiff Lions |
| 2009 (England) London | (England) Kings Cross Steelers | (England) Manchester Village Spartans | (Wales) Cardiff Lions | (England) Kings Cross Steelers | | |
| 2011 (Netherlands) Amsterdam | (England) Kings Cross Steelers | (England) Manchester Village Spartans | (France) Los Valents de Montpellier | (England) Bristol Bisons | | |
| 2013 (England) Bristol | (England) Kings Cross Steelers | (Republic of Ireland) Emerald Warriors | | | | |
| 2015 (Belgium) Brussels | (England) Kings Cross Steelers | (England) Manchester Village Spartans | (Belgium) Straffe Ketten | (Scotland) Caledonian Thebans | (Wales) Cardiff Lions | (England) Kings Cross Steelers II |
| 2017 (Spain) Madrid | (England) Kings Cross Steelers | (France) Los Valents de Montpellier | (France) Tou'Win | (England) Northampton outlaws | (France) Rebelyons | (England) Brighton & Hove Sea Serpents |

List of Winning Teams
| Year & Host City | Challenger Bowl Final | Challenger Cup Final | Union Shield Final | Cú Chulainn Plate Final | Cú Chulainn Cup Final | Cú Chulainn Bowl Final | Union Bowl Final | Union Plate Final | Ann-Louise Gilligan Bowl Final |
|---|---|---|---|---|---|---|---|---|---|
| 2019 (Republic of Ireland) Dublin | (England) Kings Cross Steelers V | (England) Manchester Village Spartans | (England) Kings Cross Steelers III | (England) Northampton Outlaws | (England) Leeds Hunters | (Scotland) Dunfermline Knights | (England) Birmingham Bulls | (England) Newcastle Ravens | (Republic of Ireland) DCU |
