= Malmö Devilants =

Gay sports club in Malmö, Sweden

Malmö Devilants RFC is a Swedish gay rugby union and volleyball club in Malmö. Malmö Devilants was founded 2004 and was the first gay rugby team in Scandinavia. Malmö Devilants is a member of International Gay Rugby Association and Board. Devilants have been playing in Union Cup in 2005 and 2007. In 2007 the club also started a volleyball team.

== Malmö Devilants in Union Cup ==
=== 2007 ===
Malmö Devilants came fourth in Union Cup 2007. Beating NOP Amsterdam 20–10 before losing to Cardiff Lions (5–35), Emerald Warriors (5–60) and Caledonian Thebans (15–20).

== See also ==
- LGBT community

== Sources ==
- Union cup 2007
- IGRAB
- Malmö Devilants
