= Emerald Warriors RFC =

Irish rugby union club based in Dublin

(Ireland) Emerald Warriors Rugby Football Club
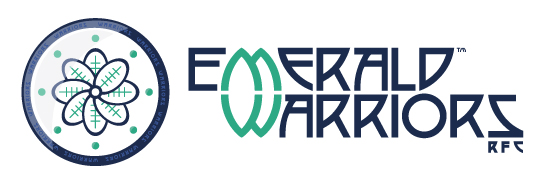
- Union: IRFU; Leinster
- Nickname: Warriors
- Founded: 2003; 23 years ago
- Location: Dublin, Ireland
- Ground(s): The High School, Dublin
- President: Richie Fagan
- Director of Rugby: Juliet Short
- Coach: Head coach Shane Dunne
- Captain: Eoin Kelly
- League(s): Leinster Metro League Division 8 and Division 10
Team kit

Official website
- www.ewrfc.ie

The Emerald Warriors are an Irish rugby team based in Dublin. They play in the Leinster Metro League Division 10 and 7 and are members of the International Gay Rugby Association and Board. They are the reigning bronze final champions since Union Cup Madrid 2017. The Warriors are Ireland's first primarily gay rugby team although it is open to anyone with an interest in playing rugby and includes heterosexual members.

== History ==
Emerald Warriors RFC was formed in August 2003 by Richie Whyte to provide gay and bisexual men the opportunity to play rugby in Ireland and internationally and to create links with similar teams and organisations in the UK, Europe and America. The team began playing in 2004 and took part in the Bingham Cup, often referred to as the 'Gay World Cup' that year, representing Ireland. They competed again in 2006 and went on to host the event in 2008, in Dublin City University's sports complex with endorsement from the IRFU. The event was deemed a success for rugby in general, for bringing gay rugby in Ireland to a new level of organisation and popularity by The Gay and Lesbian Equality Network (GLEN). They entered the Leinster Metro Junior league in 2007. They also competed in the Union Cup a biennial European, non-professional, gay rugby union tournament in London 2009, Amsterdam 2011 and Bristol 2013.

== Achievements ==
- The International Gay Rugby (IGR) Union Cup, Oslo, 2025 – Overall Winners
- The Bingham Cup, Ottawa, 2022 – Bingham Plate winners.
- The Union Cup, Madrid, 2017 – Bronze final winners.
- The Hadrian Cup, Newcastle, 2017 – Overall winners.
- The Union Cup, Newcastle, 2017 – Bronze Plate.
- The Bingham Cup, Minneapolis 2010 - Bingham Shield.
- The Union Cup, Copenhagen, 2007 – 7s Champions.

== Crest and colours ==
The club colours are green, white and blue. The team crest is based on a traditional Celtic shield with several rugby balls forming a decorative floral pattern at the center of the crest.

== Documentary film ==
The team was subject of a documentary film on Irish language station TG4 called Queering the Pitch which followed the Emerald Warriors, representing Ireland at the Bingham Cup in 2006. The documentary, which was directed by Tom Maguire, was also screened at GAZE: The Dublin International Lesbian & Gay Film Festival in 2007.

== Mention in court ruling ==
The club was mentioned in a 2009 Irish Supreme Court judgment on Portmarnock Golf Club when ruling on equality legislation regarding whether the club could prohibit women from joining. It ruled there is no prohibition on the establishment of clubs or associations whose membership is limited to persons of a particular gender and made a specific reference to the Emerald Warriors recognising that rugby is not a "need" of gay men.

== Other events ==
The Emerald Warriors hosted the Mark Bingham Memorial Cup in 2008 and will host the Union Cup in 2019. The team and its members have also taken part in events such as the Dublin Pride Parade and Mr Gay Ireland, with club member Barry Meegan who was asked by his teammates to represent the club, winning the competition in 2007 and raising money for HIV and AIDS related charities based in Dublin in the process.

== See also ==
- Ulster Titans
