= Caledonian Thebans RFC =

Scottish rugby union club, based in Edinburgh

(Scotland) Caledonian Thebans RFC
- Full name: Caledonian Thebans Rugby Football Club
- Nickname: The Thebans (Ἱερὸς Λόχος)
- Founded: 18 May 2002; 24 years ago
- Ground: The Royal High School
- Coach: Stuart Dennis (Head Coach)
- Captain(s): Simon Jones (Men's+ Captain), Amelia Elms (Women's+ Captain), Dan McGreevy (Touch Captain)
- League(s): Arnold Clark East Region League Division 3 Union Cup, Bingham Cup

Official website
- www.caledonianthebans.com

Caledonian Thebans Rugby Football Club is Scotland's leading inclusive rugby club, with teams playing both rugby union and touch rugby.

Established in 2002, the Thebans were based at Edinburgh's Murrayfield Stadium and have over 100 registered players. The club supports its players and supporters – whether gay or straight, experienced or new to the game – to enjoy rugby at a competitive level.

Through twice-weekly coaching sessions and regular matches against both mainstream and inclusive clubs (whose members are often drawn from the LGBT community), the Thebans aim to develop confident players and encourage participation in rugby union and touch rugby from groups who may have been under-represented in the sport.

== History ==
The Thebans was formed as a club primarily for gay and bisexual men who wanted to play rugby, but may have lacked the confidence to join a mainstream team. The club came to life on 18 May 2002 when Colm Cunningham, a gay man from Northern Ireland, put up a poster in the Laughing Duck – a now defunct Edinburgh gay bar.

In 2006 the club became more performance orientated. The club's playing squad now also includes a diverse mix of gay, bisexual and straight players.

In February 2016, the club played its first competitive fixture against Glasgow Alphas RUFC, the second inclusive team to be formed in Scotland.

In 2023 the Thebans established a women's+ team, the Caledonian Thebans Hydra – reflecting the Thebans' aim of promoting inclusion and encouraging participation in the game.

In 2025 the Thebans established a touch team, The Caledonian Thebans Midas.

== International competition ==
Caledonian Thebans RFC has represented Scotland at international tournaments for inclusive clubs since 2002.

The Thebans have been most successful at the biennial Union Cup, the European championships for inclusive teams. In the 2014 tournament, held in Brussels, a strong Thebans squad finished as runners-up in the Silver Plate final – losing 8–7 to hosts Straffe Ketten.

May 2016 saw the Thebans travel to Nashville, Tennessee to fight for inclusive rugby's world cup, the Bingham Cup, which takes place every second year. Unable to attend the 2014 tournament, held in Sydney, the Thebans are raising funds to send a full squad to Bingham 2020 to ensure Scotland is once again represented in this global competition. In 2016 we won the Hoagland Cup in Nashville, Tennessee.

== Affiliation ==
The Thebans are affiliated to the Scottish Rugby Union, with whom the club has built strong ties. The Thebans are also part of the International Gay Rugby Association and Board.

== Name ==
The club's name is a reference to the Sacred Band of Thebes, an elite and highly successful military unit in the Theban army of ancient Greece, which was made up of male couples. The Sacred Band of Thebes was completely annihilated, however, by Alexander the Great under Philip II of Macedon in the Battle of Chaeronea in 338 BC.
