= Minneapolis Mayhem =

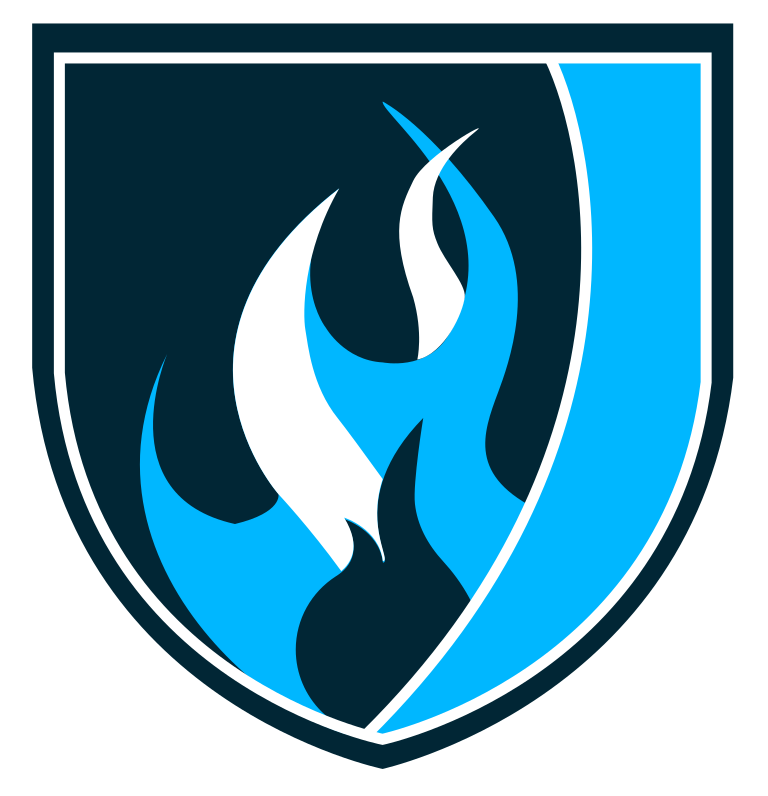
The crest of the Minneapolis Mayhem

The Minneapolis Mayhem Rugby Football Club is one of the nation’s few male rugby clubs that makes the sport accessible to traditionally underrepresented groups, including people of color, gay and bisexual men, and transgender people.

The original goal of the Minneapolis Mayhem is:

"to foster local, regional, national and international participation and competition in the game of Rugby Union Football, and to create an environment where members of the community can learn the laws and practice of Rugby, thus improving their capabilities as players."

Players started to gather in 2004. The team was officially incorporated in 2005. Since then, the Mayhem have been fortunate enough to play against teams from Minnesota, across the country, and around the world.

Historically, Mayhem RFC has been a member of the Minnesota Rugby Football Union (MNRFU), the Midwest Rugby Football Union (MRFU), USA Rugby, and International Gay Rugby Association and Board (IGRAB). The club trains and plays regularly in Minneapolis and surrounding areas.

== History ==
=== Founding and Before COVID-19 ===
Dave Peil, then owner of Grumpy’s Bar in Minneapolis, worked with a local rugby club The Metropolis RFC hosting fundraisers and third halves, tossed around the idea of starting a new predominantly gay rugby club.

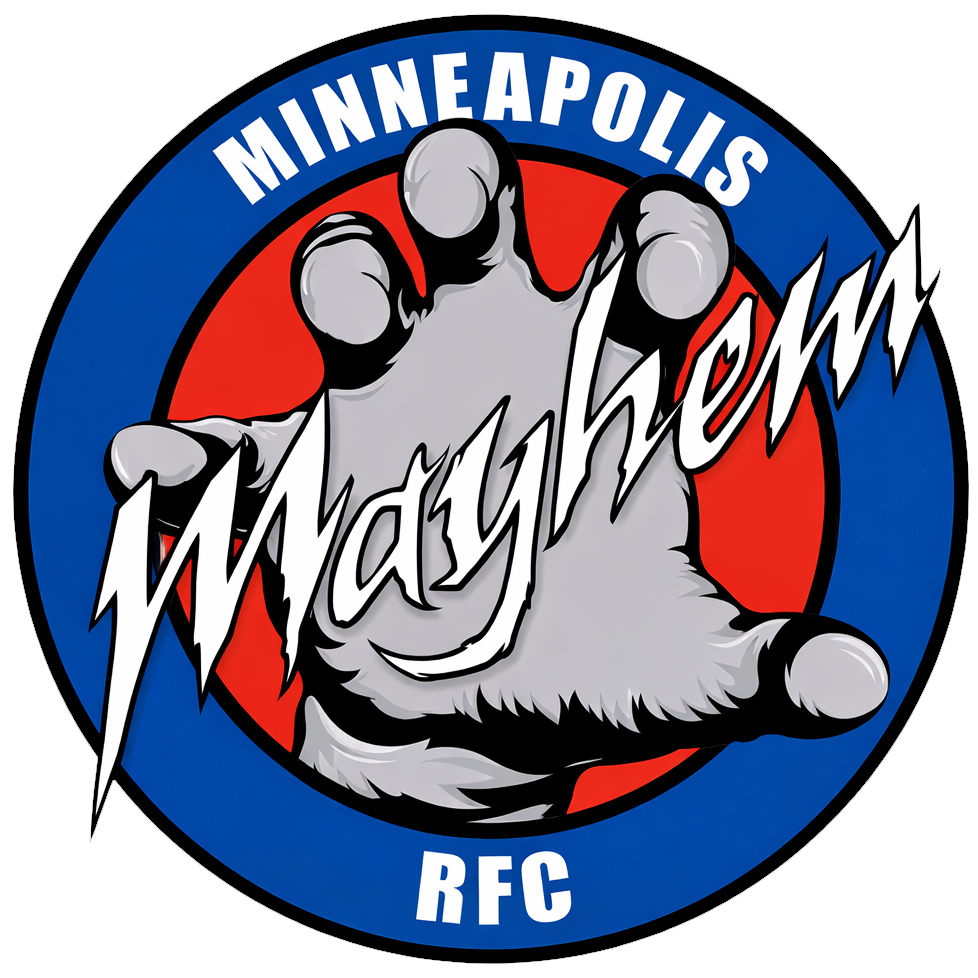
The first Minneapolis Mayhem RFC logo.

Following the model laid out in the “Starting a Club” primer by San Francisco Fog RFC founder Derrick Mickle, Peil set out generating interest through posters in bars, talking to whoever would listen, and starting a Yahoo Group (TCGayRugby) to communicate with interested people. The interest came in from around the country, board members from clubs in larger cities offering advice and words of caution that it may take a year to get enough players to field a team. By November 2004 the outline for the future of the club was in place. A short-term goal was enough members to make strong showing at the Pride Festival in June 2005, a major recruiting opportunity.

The first board was elected on February 26th 2005, naming newly founded team the Minneapolis Freeze. The name was then officially changed on March 6 when it was discovered there was an inactive club in Northern MN who had that name. The second choice of The Minneapolis Mayhem was chosen and continues today.

The first practice was on March 2nd 2005, held under the Hennepin Avenue Bridge in Minneapolis. 22 people came out for the first practice.

=== After COVID-19 ===
In 2022, a car theft by the Kia Boys during a round-robin match in Milwaukee resulted in the loss of a set of Mayhem Jerseys. Following this loss, a new set of jerseys were purchased using a design that won an internal contest among active Mayhem players.

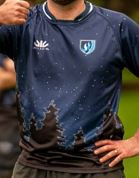
The latest design of the Mayhem's jersey

The former cheer of the Mayhem is "Tahi! Rua! Toru! Mayhem! Mayhem! Mayhem!" which is "1, 2 ,3..." in Maori. In January 2024, the team approved a new cheer: "So our fans can hear it! Mayhem! So our family can hear it! Mayhem! So they can hear it! Mayhem Mayhem Mayhem!"

== Fundraising Activities ==
The Mayhem hold multiple fundraising activities each year. Their annual team drag show, Miss Mayhem, remains one of the most popular fundraisers held by Mayhem. Additional fundraisers include themed beer busts, car washes, silent auctions, and partnerships with local breweries.

Mayhem also raises money for the Special Olympics through participating in the Twin Cities Polar Plunge.

== Bingham Cup ==
The Mayhem played in their first Bingham Cup in 2006, hosted by the Gotham Knights in New York, NY. Just over 12 months after forming, the Minneapolis Mayhem placed 5th out of 10 teams in the Plate Division.

The Minneapolis Mayhem submitted a bid to host the Bingham Cup in 2010. The only other team to submit a bid was the Sin City Irish RFC, a non-IGRAB, team. On January 21, 2009, it was announced that the Minneapolis Mayhem will host the 2010 Bingham Cup at the National Sports Center in Blaine, Minnesota.

Since then, the Minneapolis Mayhem has participated in the 2016 Bingham Cup in Nashville, Tennessee, the 2018 Bingham Cup in Amsterdam, and the 2022 Bingham Cup in Ottawa, Canada.

Mayhem did not send a team to the 2024 Bingham Cup in Rome, Italy. However, multiple Mayhem players attended and played with other teams such as the Berlin Bruisers and Gotham Knights.

== NORAM Cup ==
In 2025, the Minneapolis Mayhem defeated the Washington Renegreys, the second side of the Washington Renegades, to win the North American Bowl at the NORAM Cup Tournament. The Mayhem defeated six teams to secure the championship.

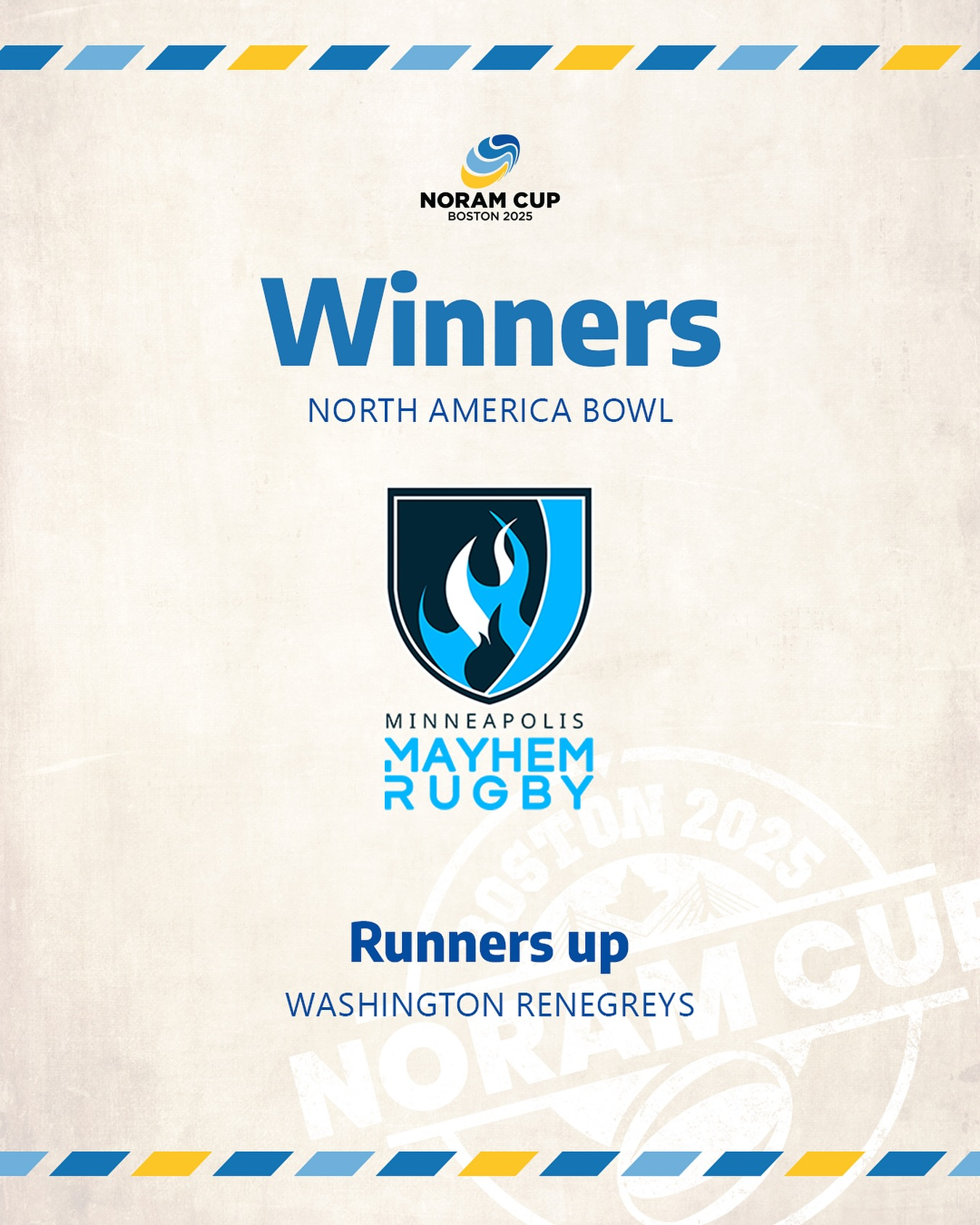
The 2025 NORAM Cup's declaration of the Minneapolis Mayhem's victory in the North American Bowl division of the NORAM tournament.

Held from May 30 to June 1, the Mayhem competed in the second tier of the IGR North American Cup Tournament (NORAM). The Mayhem beat the Atlanta Bucks, Madison Minotaurs, and the Washington Renegreys to secure the number one seed out of the pool play phase of the tournament. The next day, during the knock-out phase of the tournament, the Mayhem defeated the Seattle Quake's second side, Chicago's first side, and the Renegreys a second time to win the tier. The final point differential for the tournament was 147-3. Mayhem only let three points during a penalty kick against the Renegreys in the final match. Mayhem did not allow any tries.
