= Walk Like a Man (2008 film) =

- Directed by: Patricia Zagarella; Jim Morgison
- Produced by: Patricia Zagarella; Jim Morgison
- Edited by: Rachel Kittner; Scott Doniger
- Music by: Peter Fish
- Release date: February 2008
- Country: Australia
- Language: English

Walk Like a Man, full title Walk Like a Man: A Real Life Drama About Blood, Sweat & Queers, is a 2008 Australian documentary film about gay rugby union, co-produced and co-directed by Patricia Zagarella and Jim Morgison and narrated by Australian former rugby league international Ian Roberts.

== Synopsis ==
Filmed in San Francisco, Sydney, Australia, and New York, United States, it concentrates on preparations for the 2006 New York final of the Bingham Cup (Mark Kendall Bingham Memorial Tournament), effectively the World Cup of gay rugby union, by the two finalist teams, the reigning incumbent champions San Francisco Fog RFC and the up-and-coming rivals, the Sydney Convicts. The Convicts end up winning the Cup with a score of 16–10.

== Cast ==
Narrator

- Ian Roberts

San Francisco Fog

- Annah-Ruth Dominis
- Pete Dubois
- Sean Dmyterko
- Bryce Eberhart
- Leandro Gonzales
- Andrew Sullivan

Sydney Convicts

- Luke Carpenter
- Angus Donald
- Sam Irvine
- Andrew Purchas
- Rob Rosenberg
- Charlie Winn
- Steve Thorne

Commentators

- Peter FitzSimons
- Alice Hoagland
- Esera Tuaolo
- Chris Stahl

== Background ==
The Bingham Cup is named after Mark Bingham, a gay rugby player and a member of San Francisco Fog. During the 9/11 attacks, he was a passenger on United Airlines Flight 93 and stormed the cockpit and prevented the hijackers from hitting their eventual target.

== Production ==
The film, whose full title is Walk Like A Man: A Real Life Drama About Blood, Sweat And Queers, was directed and produced by Patricia Zagarella and Jim Morgison, and written by Lester Shane and Patrick Downs. Production completed in 2007.

== Release ==
The film was released in February 2008. It was shown on Australian Special Broadcasting Service and also shown on Logo TV.

== Reception ==
In 2020, NME rated the film no. 8 in its list of "The 15 greatest Australian LGBTQI films of all time".
