= Boston Ironsides RFC =

Boston Ironsides
- Full name: Boston Ironsides Rugby Football Club
- Union: NERFU
- Nickname: The Ironsides
- Founded: 2002; 24 years ago
- Location: Boston, Massachusetts
- Ground: Joe Moakley Park
- League: NERFU 04
Team kit

Official website
- www.bostonironsides.org

Boston Ironsides Rugby Football Club is a rugby union football club based in Boston, Massachusetts. The Ironsides play in the New England Rugby Football Union as a Division 4 Men's Team; retaining around 40-60 members (players and supporters) each season.

The Boston Ironsides are affiliated with World Rugby, based in Dublin, Ireland. They are sanctioned by USA Rugby, the governing body for the sport of rugby in the United States. Their geographical union is NERFU, the New England Rugby Football Union. The Ironsides represent Massachusetts, Rhode Island, Connecticut and New Hampshire as New England's only competitive and fully accredited member of the International Gay Rugby Association and Board (IGRAB), headquartered in London, England. IGRAB is an organization that promotes rugby as an inclusive, non--discriminatory sport which everyone can play, regardless of sexual orientation, gender, race, religion, nationality, ethnic origin, political beliefs, athletic ability, age, physical challenge, mental challenge, or health status. IGRAB organizes the biennial Mark Kendall Bingham Memorial Tournament, popularly known as the Bingham Cup, the Rugby World Cup for gay and gay-friendly teams.

The Bingham Cup is named for Mark Bingham, an openly gay rugger and one of the heroes who gave their lives to thwart the terrorist hijackers of United Flight 93 on September 11, 2001.

== History ==
Players of the team in 2006

At the height of American patriotism following the attacks on 9/11, members of New York's Gotham Knights arrived in Boston to begin laying the initial groundwork and recruiting players for a Boston-based gay-friendly rugby club. On July 28, 2002 the Boston Ironsides RFC (Rugby Football Club) was formed. The Ironsides grew rapidly and became competitive in their division. This momentum culminated in May 2006, when the Ironsides won the inaugural Bingham Bowl at the Mark Kendall Bingham Memorial Championship.

Following a period of inactivity after this achievement, the team began a renewed recruitment effort in early 2010. A dynamic coaching staff and the dedication of key team leaders have revitalized the Ironsides with an energy that can be seen on the pitch. In June 2012 the Ironsides shut out opponents on the first day of competition at the VI Bingham Cup in Manchester, United Kingdom and quickly became known as a force to be reckoned with in amateur rugby union.

The Ironsides sent several players to the 2014 Bingham cup, and were the first team to register.

In 2016, the Ironsides went to Nashville to compete in their Bingham Cup.

2018 took the Ironsides to Amsterdam for their Bingham Cup.

In 2019, the Ironsides grew to over 60 members and were able to field two separate teams on the same day. With one team competing in D4 NERFU Competition against Rutland Rugby Club, and the other competing in a friendly against the South Shore Anchors Old Boys.

In 2020, the Ironsides were scheduled to compete at the Ottawa Bingham Cup, but due to COVID-19, the tournament, and the season as a whole was cancelled. No rugby competitions were played this year.

In 2021, the Ironsides continued onward with the Spring season cancelled due to COVID-19 once again. The team continues its efforts off the field in social engagement and philanthropy while they wait to resume play.

In 2022, the Ironsides headed to Ottawa to compete in the rescheduled Bingham Cup.

In 2023, the Ironsides, as well as a mixed team with the Village Lions, took 2nd in the Inaugural NORAM Cup.

== Press ==
The Boston Ironsides have been featured in several newspapers over the years.

- Bay Windows Article on the 2006 Bingham Bowl win
- InNewsweekly Article on the 2006 Bingham Bowl win
- Boston.com article on the Boston Ironsides
- Improper Bostonian article

== Affiliations ==
- World Rugby
- USA Rugby
- NERFU
- IGRAB
