= Gotham Knight =

Gotham Knight or Gotham Knights refer to:

- Batman
- Batman: Gotham Knight, a 2008 animated superhero anthology film
- Batman: Gotham Knights, a monthly American comic book series that was published by DC Comics
- Gotham Knights (rugby union), a division III men's club in the Metropolitan New York Rugby Union
- Gotham Knights (video game), a 2022 video game
- Gotham Knights (TV series)
