= San Francisco Fog =

San Francisco Fog may refer to:

- San Francisco fog, a fog that frequently occurs in the area of San Francisco, California, U.S.
- San Francisco Fog RFC, a rugby football club
- San Francisco Fog (MISL), later the Kansas City Comets, a defunct indoor soccer team
