= Walk Like a Man =

Walk Like a Man may refer to:

== Music ==
- "Walk Like a Man" (The Four Seasons song), 1963, also covered by Divine in 1985
- "Walk Like a Man" (Grand Funk Railroad song), 1973
- "Walk Like a Man", a song by Bon Jovi from Lost Highway
- "Walk Like a Man", a song by Bruce Springsteen from Tunnel of Love
- "Walk Like a Man", a song by MURS from Murs 3:16: The 9th Edition
- "Walk Like a Man", a song by Tim McGraw from Live Like You Were Dying

== Film and television ==
- Walk Like a Man (1987 film), a 1987 comedy film
- Walk Like a Man (2008 film), a 2008 documentary film
- "Walk Like a Man" (The Sopranos), a 2007 episode of The Sopranos
- "Walk Like a Man", an episode of Yes, Dear
