= Ulster Titans =

Irish rugby union club, based in Belfast

(Northern Ireland) Ulster Titans Rugby Football Club
- Union: IRFU; Ulster
- Nickname: Titans
- Founded: 2007; 19 years ago
- Disbanded: 2010; 16 years ago
- Location: Belfast, Northern Ireland
- League(s): Ulster Magners Minor League, East 2

The Ulster Titans was a Northern Irish rugby union team based in Belfast. They played East 2 of the Ulster Magners Minor League and are members of the International Gay Rugby Association and Board. The club colours are black, yellow and white.

== History ==
The club was founded in February 2007 in order to provide diverse people a chance to play rugby. They first participated in the Bingham Cup 2008 and won the Bingham Shield in a final against Toronto Muddy York. Paul Leonard was chosen as the first Captain in 2007. The founding members are Belfast born Sean Mc Evoy and Dublin born Trevor Mc Mahon who were also chairmen for the club.

Due to dwindling numbers meaning that a full team could no longer support the requirements of the local league the club was officially disbanded in 2010. Many of its members went on to play in other local IRFU affiliated clubs and as part of Barbarian teams in the 2012 Bingham Cup.

== See also ==
- Emerald Warriors RFC
