= Ottawa Wolves =

- Full name: Ottawa Wolves Rugby Football Club
- Unions: Rugby Canada; IGR
- Branch: Eastern Ontario Rugby Union
- Emblem: howling wolf
- Founded: 2008
- Region: Rugby Ontario
- Ground: Springhurst Park
- President: Emilie Létourneau
Team kit	2nd kit

Official website
- ottawawolves.ca

The Ottawa Wolves are a rugby union football club for men and women in Ottawa, Ontario, Canada. The men's side of the club is predominantly made up of gay men, but both sides of the team are inclusive of anyone who wishes to join regardless of sexual orientation.

== History ==
The Ottawa Wolves RFC was founded in 2008 by Carl Pilon and Jay Smidt, both Hero award recipients, with the mission to promote and encourage participation in rugby among those who have traditionally been under-represented in the game, with an emphasis on gay men.

The club played its first game in October 2008 at the inaugural Dirty Rugger Tournament, where they tied the Muddy York 5-5.

The following year, the Ottawa Wolves joined both the Ontario Rugby Union and the International Gay Rugby Association and Board (IGR), and played their first season as the only team in the EORU Men's Division II developmental league. In a 7-game season against teams in Men's Division I, the Ottawa Wolves finished with 513 points against, and 0 points for. The Ottawa Wolves' first league try, scored by Danny Donnini, came in their 2009 playoff game against the Barrhaven Scottish III.

The team's first victory came on August 1, 2009, against the Muddy York in Montreal. Shortly afterward, the club followed that victory with their second against the Ottawa Senators RFC.

In 2010, the team participated in a rugby match with the Muddy York during Pride Week. The historic match was played on the main lawn of Parliament on August 28, 2010.

Expanding on the success of the men's side as a community fixture, the Wolves' women's side commenced its inaugural season in the spring of 2013.

As a gay-identified team, The Ottawa Wolves have participated in Capital Pride since 2008.

== Involvement in IGR ==
On July 23, 2009, The Ottawa Wolves RFC became a member club of International Gay Rugby (IGR); they joined the Vancouver Rogues and the Toronto Muddy York RFC as Canada's third IGR club.

The IGR sanctions the biennial Mark Kendall Bingham Memorial Tournament, known casually by the name of its principal trophy, The Bingham Cup. In 2010, The Ottawa Wolves participated in the 5th Bingham Cup in Minneapolis, USA, losing the 3rd division final to the Seattle Quake RFC. At the 6th Bingham Cup in Manchester, UK, The Ottawa Wolves claimed the Hoagland Tribute Cup in a hard-fought match against the Bristol Bisons, winning with the prize with a final score of 5–0. In August 2014, The Wolves brought a full men's side and a partial women's side to the 7th Bingham Cup in Sydney, Australia. The Wolves lost in the Division 3 final to the Philadelphia Gryphons, having arrived at the final undefeated. The tournament was witnessed by more than 6000 spectators including Australia's Governor General, Sir Peter Cosgrove, and ARU CEO, Bill Pulver.

== Club Presidents ==
2008 - Carl Pilon
2009 - Carl Pilon
2010 - Carl Pilon
2011 - John Festarini
2012 - John Festarini
2013 - Dave Rose
2014 - Jerome Hamoline
2015 - Sylvain Roussell
2016 - Miguel Olivier
2017 - Nadine Elle
2022 - Emilie Létourneau
