= Flight 93 (film) =

2006 television film directed by Peter Markle

- Film poster
- Written by: Nevin Schreiner
- Directed by: Peter Markle
- Starring: Jeffrey Nordling; Colin Glazer; Brennan Elliott; Ty Olsson; Jacqueline Ann Steuart; Barry W. Levy; Biski Gugushe; Dominic Rains
- Music by: Velton Ray Bunch
- Country of origin: United States
- Original languages: English; Arabic

Production
- Executive producers: David Gerber; Delia Fine
- Producer: Clara George
- Cinematography: Mark Irwin
- Editor: Scott Boyd
- Running time: 89 minutes
- Production companies: The Gerber Company; Fox Television Studios

Original release
- Network: A&E
- Release: January 30, 2006

Flight 93 is a 2006 American drama television film directed by Peter Markle and written by Nevin Schreiner, which chronicles the events onboard United Airlines Flight 93 during the September 11 attacks in 2001. It premiered on January 30, 2006, on A&E, and was re-broadcast several times throughout 2006.

== Plot ==
On the morning of September 11, 2001, first officer LeRoy Homer Jr. leaves his family for work. Passengers board United Airlines Flight 93 at Newark Liberty International Airport for a flight to San Francisco. Among them are four al-Qaeda hijackers: Ziad Jarrah, Saeed al-Ghamdi, Ahmed al-Haznawi, and Ahmed al-Nami.

Forty-six minutes after takeoff, the hijackers seize control of the aircraft, attacking passengers, crew members, and the pilots. Homer manages to transmit a distress call before he and Captain Jason Dahl are incapacitated.

Using airphones, the passengers learn from family members about the attacks on the World Trade Center and the Pentagon. Realizing that their aircraft is also part of the attacks, several passengers organize an attempt to retake the plane. They hope passenger Donald Greene, who has flying experience, will be able to control the aircraft if they reach the cockpit.

After making final calls to their loved ones, the passengers begin their counterattack and fight their way toward the cockpit. As they get closer, the remaining hijackers realize that they may lose control of the aircraft. The passengers eventually breach the cockpit, but Jarrah deliberately sends the aircraft into a nosedive before they can regain control. Flight 93 crashes into a field in Pennsylvania, killing everyone aboard. The film concludes with emergency personnel arriving at the crash site and a depiction of the site changing over time.

== Cast ==
=== Passengers ===
- Jeffrey Nordling as Tom Burnett
- Colin Glazer as Jeremy Glick
- Brennan Elliott as Todd Beamer
- Ty Olsson as Mark Bingham
- Jacqueline Ann Steuart as Lauren Grandcolas
- Laura Mennell as Honor Elizabeth Wainio
- Jerry Wasserman as Mark Rothenberg
- Greg Thorlacius as Louis J. Nacke II
- Keith Martin Gordey as Donald Greene
- Meghan Heffern as Nicole Carol Miller (uncredited)
- Chad Hershler as Richard Guadagno (uncredited)
- Kenneth Kantymir as Andrew Garcia (uncredited)
- Michael Robinson as Alan Anthony Beaven (uncredited)

=== Crew ===
- Barry W. Levy as Captain Jason Dahl
- Biski Gugushe as First Officer LeRoy Homer Jr.
- Wanda Cannon as Deborah Welsh
- Patricia Harras as Sandra Bradshaw
- Karen Holness as CeeCee Lyles
- Linda Darlow as Lorraine G. Bay
- BJ Harrison as Wanda Anita Green

=== Hijackers ===
- Dominic Rains as Ziad Jarrah
- Zak Santiago as Ahmed al-Haznawi
- Shawn Ahmed as Saeed al-Ghamdi
- Asim Wali as Ahmed al-Nami

=== Passengers' relatives ===
- Kendall Cross as Deena Burnett (Tom Burnett's wife)
- April Telek as Lyzbeth Glick (Jeremy Glick's wife)
- Marilyn Norry as Alice Hoagland (Mark Bingham's mother)
- Kirsten Williamson as Melodie Homer (LeRoy Homer Jr.'s wife)
- Gwynyth Walsh as Esther Heyman (Honor Elizabeth Wainio's mother)
- Rob Morton as Vaughn Hoglan (Mark Bingham's maternal uncle)
- Jenn Forgie as Kathy Hoglan (Vaugh Hoglan's wife)
- Kate Robbins as Joanne Makely (Jeremy Glick's mother-in-law)
- Madison Bell as Anna Claire Burnett (Tom Burnett's daughter)
- Drew Shluter as Halley Elizabeth Burnett (Tom Burnett's daughter)
- Sydney Shluter as Madison Margaret Burnett (Tom Burnett's daughter)

=== Others ===
- Monnae Michaell as Lisa Jefferson
- Tom Butler as Colonel
- Michael Adamthwaite as Major
- Michael Daingerfield as FBI Agent
- Chris Kalhoon as Junior Officer
- Daryl Shuttleworth as Boston Supervisor
- Aaron Pearl as Boston Controller #1
- Roger Haskett as Boston Controller #2
- Adam J. Harrington as Dixie (F-16 Pilot)
- John Furey as Cleveland Controller #1
- Ingrid Torrance as Cleveland Controller #2
- Benita Ha as Gate Agent
- Michael Kopsa as Newark Controller
- Hrothgar Mathews as Michael Woodward
- Bill Mondy as United Executive #2
- Sean Campbell as Fire Captain
- Anthony Harrison as Small Plane Pilot
- Ivan Cermak as JFK Controller
- Leah Allers as Telephone Operator Supervisor Miss Dooley (uncredited)

== Production ==
Executive producer David Gerber said that the filmmakers used phone records, transcripts, interviews with family members of the victims, and months of research in developing the film. Gerber said the production also conducted extensive research into the passengers and crew and sought to limit dialogue that could not be verified.

By December 2005, director Peter Markle was completing production on the film in Los Angeles.

== Awards ==
The film received the award for "Outstanding Sound Editing for a Miniseries, Movie or a Special" at the 2006 Emmy Awards.

- Chris Julian, Foley Artist
- Mark Linden, Sound Editor
- Tara A. Paul, Effects Editor
- Geoff Raffan, Dialog Editor
- Carlos Ramirez, ADR/Dialog Editor
- Joan Rowe, Foley Artist
- David A. Scharf, Dialog Editor
- Harry Snodgrass, Supervising Sound Editor

== Home media ==
The DVD version was released on June 26, 2006. It came in 3 languages, English, Arabic, and Japanese.

== See also ==
- Flight 93 (disambiguation)
- List of cultural references to the September 11 attacks
