= Chris Julian (producer) =

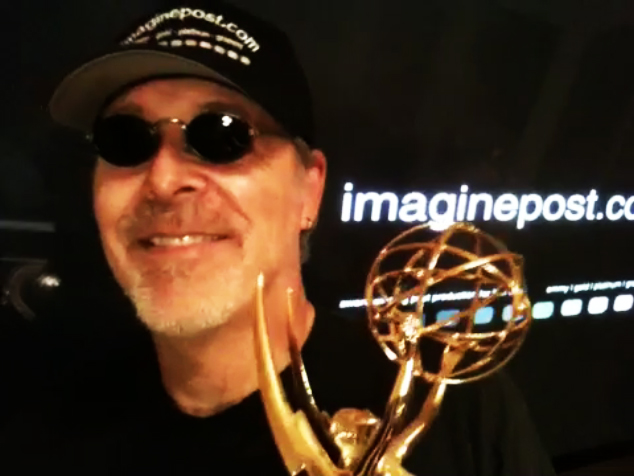
- Chris Julian with Emmy Award

Background information
- Born: Chris Julian Irwin; November 12, 1957 (age 68); Boston, Massachusetts, U.S.
- Origin: Westfield, New Jersey, U.S.
- Genres: Film sound, film editing, R&B, funk, soul, rock & roll, swing, jazz, hip hop, and others
- Occupations: Foley artist, foley mixer, sound supervisor and editor, picture editor, musician, conductor, producer, screenwriter, songwriter, arranger, composer
- Instruments: Voice, trombone, timpani, guitar, bass, strings, horns, keyboards, electronic
- Years active: 1979 – present
- Labels: Imagine Post, Calliope, BANG
- Website: chrisjulian.com

Chris Julian Irwin (born November 12, 1957), known professionally as Chris Julian, is an American film and music producer.

== Musical career ==
Julian is classically trained in voice, trombone and timpani. As a contemporary engineer, session player, producer and arranger he plays guitar, bass, strings, horns, and keyboards, and arranges, records, and programs samples and drum loops. He has produced songs for artists ranging from Stetsasonic to Jimmy Webb. Julian toured as a lead singer for six years around the United States with his rock band.

=== Calliope Productions ===
In 1984, Julian, with partners Fortunato Procopio and Joe Teig, founded Calliope Productions, a New York City based recording studio and production company. The studio became the center for the East Coast hip hop movement known as the "Native Tongues." Julian collaborated with hip hop artists such as De La Soul, Biz Markie, Naughty by Nature, Deee-lite, Tribe Called Quest, 3rd Bass, and P.M. Dawn, "forging a new African American roots awareness, and a progressive, brainy, 'hippy' sensibility within the hip hop community." As producer, composer, engineer, writer, and instrumentalist, Julian's work spanned several genres as he collaborated with celebrities Don Was, Manny Marroquin, Jimmy Webb, Art Garfunkel, Chaka Khan, David Bowie, Isaac Hayes, Vanessa Williams, and David Crosby. Calliope closed its doors in 1994.

=== BANG Music ===
Julian was the co-owner and co-founder of BANG Music, a youth oriented commercial music production company. At BANG, Julian and his colleagues wrote and produced commercials for Coca-Cola, Pepsi, Mercedes-Benz, Anheuser-Busch, Ford, Burger King, The American Cancer Society, Procter & Gamble, Sony, and other national sponsors.

=== Awards ===
Julian won an Emmy "For Outstanding Sound Editing For A Mini-Series, Movie, or Special" in 2006 for his work on the A&E TV film, Flight 93.

=== Music industry ===
Date	Artist	Album/Single	Award (Gold/Platinum Record)
1989	De La Soul	3 ft. High and Rising	Gold
1989	De La Soul	Me, Myself & I	Gold
1990	Deee-Lite	Groove is in the Heart	Gold
1990	Deee-Lite	World Clique	Gold
1990	3rd Bass	The Cactus Album	Gold
1990	Partners in Kryme	Turtle Power	Gold
1990	Biz Markie	The Biz Never Sleeps	Gold
1990	Biz Markie	Just a Friend	Gold
1990	Biz Markie	Just a Friend	Platinum
1991	De La Soul	De La Soul is Dead	Gold
1991	3rd Bass	Pop Goes the Weasel	Gold
1991	3rd Bass	Derelicts of Dialect	Gold
1991	P.M. Dawn	Set Adrift on Memory Bliss	Gold
1991	P.M. Dawn	Of the Heart, Of the Soul & Of the Cross	Gold
1991	Naughty by Nature	Naughty by Nature (Album)	Gold
1991	Naughty by Nature	Naughty by Nature (Greatest Hits)	Gold
1991	Teenage Mutant Ninja Turtles	Teenage Mutant Ninja Turtles	Gold
1991	Teenage Mutant Ninja Turtles	Teenage Mutant Ninja Turtles	Platinum
1992	Black Sheep	A Wolf in Sheep's Clothing	Gold
1992	A Tribe Called Quest	The Low End Theory	Gold
1992	Naughty by Nature	Naughty by Nature (Album)	Platinum
1992	Naughty by Nature	Naughty by Nature (Greatest Hits)	Platinum
1993	P.M. Dawn	The Bliss Album	Gold
1996	A Tribe Called Quest	People's Instinctive Travels, Parts of Rhythm	Gold
1999	Gang Starr	Full Clip	Gold
2000	De La Soul	3 ft. High and Rising	Platinum
2009	Digable Planets	Reachin' (Album)	Gold
2009	Digable Planets	Reachin' (Single)	Gold

=== Film industry ===
Date	Title	Venue	Award Category/Type	Win/Nomination/Official Selection
2001	Judy's Time	American Cinema Editors	Eddie	Nomination
2001	Judy's Time	Heartland Film Festival	Jimmy Stewart Crystal Heart Memorial Award	Win
2002	Judy's Time	International Documentary Association	IDA Award for Best Documentary	Win
2005	Faith Of My Fathers	Emmy Award	Art Direction for a Miniseries or Movie	Nomination
2005	Faith Of My Fathers	American Society of Cinematographers	Cinematography - Movie of Week/Mini-Series/Pilot	Nomination
2005	Ellie Parker	Sundance Film Festival	Grand Jury Prize	Nomination
2005	Faith Of My Fathers	Emmy Award	Cinematography for a Miniseries or Movie	Nomination
2005	Faith Of My Fathers	Emmy Award	Camera Picture Editing for a Miniseries or Movie	Nomination
2005	Faith Of My Fathers	Emmy Award	Camera Sound Mixing for a Miniseries or Movie	Nomination
2005	Ellie Parker	Seattle International Film Festival	Audience Award Best Narrative Feature	Win
2005	Ellie Parker	Seattle International Film Festival	New American Cinema Special Jury Prize	Win
2006	Flight 93	Emmy Award	Single-Camera Sound Mixing for a Miniseries or Movie	Nomination
2006	Flight 93	Emmy Award	Single-Camera Picture Editing for a Miniseries or Movie	Nomination
2006	Flight 93	Emmy Award	Outstanding Made for Television Movie	Nomination
2006	Flight 93	Emmy Award	Writing for a Mini-series, Movie, or Dramatic Special	Nomination
2006	Flight 93	Emmy Award	Sound Mixing for a Mini-series or a Movie	Nomination
2006	Flight 93	Emmy Award	Directing for Mini-series, Movie, or Dramatic Special	Nomination
2006	Flight 93	Cinema Audio Society	Sound Mixing for TV Movies and Mini-Series	Win
2006	Sasquatch Dumpling	Slamdance Film Festival	Audience Award Best Narrative Feature	Win
2006	Flight 93	Emmy Award: Chris Julian	Sound Editing for a Mini-series, Movie, or Special	Win
2007	Flight 93	Directors Guild of America	USA DGA Award	Nomination
2007	Flight 93	PGA Golden Laurel Award	Television Producer of Year Award in Longform	Nomination
2007	Flight 93	Writers Guild of America	WGA Award (TV)	Win
2007	Humble Pie	Bend Film Festival	Best Screenplay Jury Prize	Win
2007	Humble Pie	Bend Film Festival	Best Of Show Award	Win
2007	Humble Pie	Bend Film Festival	Best Actor Jury Prize	Win
2008	Donut Shop Hero	Show Off Your Shorts	Best Short Comedy	Nomination
2008	Donut Shop Hero	Tiburon International Film Festival	Best Feature: Best Comedy Golden Reel Award	Win
2008	Donut Shop Hero	The Indie Fest	Award Of Merit	Win
2008	Donut Shop Hero	Tiburon International Film Festival	Best Feature: Best Film Golden Reel Award	Win
2009	Bitch Slap	Toronto International Film Festival	n/a	Official Selection
2009	Outrage	Best Unsung International Film Festival	Action Films From All Over The World	Official Selection
2009	Hard Breakers	Maverick Movie Awards	Best Actress	Nomination
2009	Hard Breakers	Maverick Movie Awards	Best Sound Design/Editing	Nomination
2009	Donut Shop Hero	Las Vegas International Film Festival	Silver Ace Award	Win
2009	Melancholy Baby	Accolade Competition	Official Selection	Win
2009	Melancholy Baby	USA Film Festival/Shorts	Film & Video Competition	Win
2009	Outrage	Action on Film International Film Festival	Best Science Fiction Film	Win
2010	Outrage	Amelia Film Festival	n/a	Official Selection
2010	This Is Nowhere	South By Southwest Film Festival	n/a	Official Selection
2010	Bitch Slap	Cannes International Film Festival	n/a	Official Selection
2010	Bitch Slap	Cucaloris Film Festival	n/a	Official Selection
2010	Bitch Slap	Stockholm International Film Festival	n/a	Official Selection
2010	Bitch Slap	Oslo International Film Festival	n/a	Official Selection
2010	Bitch Slap	Helsinki International Film Festival	n/a	Official Selection
2010	Bitch Slap	Torino Film Festival	n/a	Official Selection
2010	Bitch Slap	Athens International Film Festival	n/a	Official Selection
2010	Bitch Slap	Dallas International Film Festival	n/a	Official Selection
2010	Bitch Slap	Estepona Horror Film Festival	n/a	Official Selection
2010	Bitch Slap	Fangoria Trinity of Terrors	n/a	Official Selection
2010	Coyote County Loser	Big Bear International Film Festival	n/a	Official Selection
2010	Coyote County Loser	Fallbrook Film Festival	n/a	Official Selection
2010	Coyote County Loser	540 Film Festival	n/a	Official Selection
2010	Coyote County Loser	Breckenridge Festival of Film	Best Comedy	Win
2011	Out of Nowhere	South by Southwest Film Festival	n/a	Official Selection
2011	Out of Nowhere	Indianapolis International Film Festival	n/a	Official Selection
2011	Out of Nowhere	Los Angeles International Short Film Festival	n/a	Official Selection
2011	Out of Nowhere	Abu Dhabi International Short Film Festival	n/a	Official Selection
2011	Out of Nowhere	Cinequest International Film Festival	n/a	Official Selection
2011	Out of Nowhere	New York Rooftop Film Series	n/a	Official Selection
2011	Out of Nowhere	Seattle International Film Festival	n/a	Official Selection
2011	Paper In My Pockets 24/7	Burbank International Film Festival	n/a	Official Selection
2011	Patient Zero	Los Angeles Film Festival	n/a	Official Selection
2011	Patient Zero	Festival de Cannes Short Film Corner	n/a	Official Selection
2011	Reality Clock	USC First Frame Festival	n/a	Official Selection
2011	Away From The Ranch	Long Island International Film Expo & Ivy Film Festival	n/a	Official Selection
2011	Patient Zero	Newport Beach International Film Festival	n/a	Official Selection
2011	Away From The Ranch	Newport Beach International Film Festival	n/a	Official Selection
2011	Out of Nowhere	St. Louis International Film Festival	n/a	Official Selection
2011	From The Midst of Pain	Wales International Film Festival	Best U.S. Documentary	Win
2011	Reality Clock	Los Angeles 3D Movie Festival	Award for Outstanding Student Achievement	Win
2011	Reality Clock	Alfred P. Sloan Foundation	Sloan Science & Film Award	Win
2011	From The Midst of Pain	Mojave Film Festival	Best Documentary	Win
