= Copenhagen Wolves RFC =

- Full name: Copenhagen Wolves Rugby Football Club
- Nickname: The Wolves
- Founded: 2017
- Location: Copenhagen, Denmark
- Chairman: Wai Hoe Chum
- Coach(es): Iain Todd (head), Peter Munk
- Captain: Brendan Fitzpatrick
- League: 2. Division
Team kit

Copenhagen Wolves RFC is the rugby section of Pan Idræt, and is a member of the Danish Rugby Union (Rugby Danmark) and the International Gay Rugby (IGR). As Denmark's only LGBT+ inclusive rugby team, the Wolves promote diversity, inclusivity, and visibility for LGBT+ individuals in rugby.

== Background ==
Following the principles of Denmark's first inclusive rugby team, CPH Scrum RFC (est. 2004, renamed Copenhagen Wolves RFC in 2011, and revived in 2017), the team provides a welcoming environment for anyone interested in rugby, regardless of experience or background.

== Aims and activities ==
The Wolves are committed to inclusivity and actively campaign for inclusion of transgender players while working to grow and diversify the rugby community in Denmark. They also participate in local and international matches as a member of Rugby Danmark and the IGR, respectively.
