= Nashville Grizzlies RFC =

Tennessee rugby club

Nashville Grizzlies RFC
Name	Nashville Grizzlies Rugby Football Club
Mascot	Grizzly bear
Colors	Navy blue, maroon, & gold
Founded	2006
Motto	Tecum Fratre
Sport	Rugby Union Football
Union	MidSouth Rugby Football Union
Website	www.GrizzliesRugby.org

Nashville Grizzlies RFC (Rugby Football Club) is a men's rugby union football club in Nashville, Tennessee. The club was formed in 2006 to bring the sport to typically under-represented populations (specifically gay men) although it welcomes anyone interested in the sport. The club is made up of approximately 90 members (as of March, 2011) consisting of both active players, as well as non-playing Auxiliary members.

== Competitions ==
=== Local ===
The club competes locally within Division III of the MidSouth Rugby Football Union, a local area union within the USA Rugby South territorial union, itself part of USA Rugby.

=== National/International ===
The club is also a member club of the International Gay Rugby Association & Board (IGRAB), an umbrella organization for gay rugby clubs worldwide. As an IGRAB member, the club plays against other member clubs across the United States and internationally in one-on-one matches and in formal and informal tournaments.

In October 2010, the club played in the Hellfest tournament, hosted by the Dallas Diablos RFC. The team placed fourth out of a field of eight teams. May 2011 saw the Grizzlies competing in the Chicago Dragons Midwest Invitational tournament, placing fourth of seven teams. The team placed third of six teams in Spring Fever IGRAB Invitational Tournament hosted by the St. Louis Crusaders in March 2012.

The team has thrice competed in IGRAB's Mark Kendall Bingham Memorial Tournament (aka, the Bingham Cup), the gay rugby union world cup. Club members playing as part of the World Barbarians side won the Plate Division at the 2008 tournament in Dublin, Ireland. The club traveled to Manchester, England for the 2012 Bingham Cup, placing 15th out of a field of 40+ teams. The Grizzlies were named the inaugural recipients of the Ben Cohen StandUp Award, given "for outstanding team sportsmanship in the game of rugby" at the Manchester awards banquet.

In 2014 the team submitted a bid and won the honor of hosting the Bingham Cup in 2016.

== Social & Community Activities ==
Like most rugby clubs, the Nashville Grizzlies conduct and participate in a number of activities off the pitch. After each home match, the club holds a Third Half social which is open to the public and the opposing side. Club nights are held each month at one of several local bars as both social/recruiting functions and fundraisers.

The club also holds an annual fun run and pub crawl (the Grizzlies Red Dress Rampage) which is a joint fundraiser for the team and for Nashville's Belcourt Theatre. The team also works with the Nashville chapter of Habitat for Humanity, and each year sponsors a roller disco party in support of Nashville Pride.
