= The Flight That Fought Back =

2005 American TV series

- DVD cover
- Written by: Phil Craig; Victoria Spark
- Directed by: Bruce Goodison
- Starring: Kiefer Sutherland
- Country of origin: United States
- Original language: English

Production
- Producer: Phil Craig
- Running time: 90 minutes

Original release
- Network: Discovery Channel
- Release: September 11, 2005

The Flight That Fought Back is a 2005 American docudrama film produced by the London-based company Brook Lapping Productions for the Discovery Channel, about United Airlines Flight 93. The program debuted in the United States on September 11, 2005, marking the fourth anniversary of the event on which it is based.

The dramatic film, narrated by Kiefer Sutherland and featuring a cast of actors playing hijackers, passengers and crew, and interviews with witnesses and relatives/acquaintances of the real individuals involved, reconstructs the events that led to Flight 93's crash in Stonycreek Township, Pennsylvania, approximately 150 miles (240 km) northwest of Washington, D.C., during the September 11 attacks in 2001.

== Crew ==
The film was directed by Bruce Goodison and edited by London-based documentary filmmaker Joby Gee. It starred Greg Benson as passenger Tom Burnett, Jason LeGrande as passenger Mark Bingham, and Pej Vahdat as terrorist Ziad Jarrah. Original music was provided for the film by London-based post-rock musician Mark Beazley, more frequently known as Rothko, and composer Gavin Skinner.

== Charity ==
Discovery is donating all proceeds from sales from the DVD to the construction of the permanent Flight 93 National Memorial.

== Reception ==
The film received an Emmy nomination for Outstanding Made-for-Television Movie.

== International release ==
The film aired on Five in the United Kingdom on January 5, 2006; on Channel One in Russia on September 8, 2007; on the Japanese Discovery Channel as well as the German television channel Kabel1 on September 11, 2007; and on Irish channel RTÉ2 on September 11, 2010.

== See also ==
- Flight 93 (disambiguation)
