= Los Angeles Rebellion =

American rugby union club

Los Angeles Rebellion

Since 2001, the Los Angeles Rebellion Rugby Union Football Club is the first rugby union club in Southern California that deliberately welcomes players, coaches and supporters of all ages, races, genders and sexual orientations.

The Rebellion RFC is a member of IGRAB: The International Gay Rugby Association and Board, also SCRFU: Southern California Rugby Football Union, USA Rugby, and IRB: the International Rugby Board.
