= Flight 93 (disambiguation) =

United Airlines Flight 93 was a plane hijacked as part of the September 11, 2001, attacks.

Flight 93 or United 93 may also refer to:

== Arts, entertainment and media ==
- Flight 93 (film), a 2006 TV drama about United 93
- United 93 (film), a 2006 docudrama about United 93
- "Flight 093 Is Missing", a season 2 episode of Airwolf

== Other uses ==
- Pan Am Flight 93, in the Dawson's Field hijackings in September 1970

== See also ==
- Flight 93 National Memorial, in Pennsylvania, U.S., at the site of the crash of United 93
- I Missed Flight 93, a 2006 TV documentary
- The Flight That Fought Back, a 2005 docudrama film about United 93
- "The Flight 93 Election", a 2016 essay by Michael Anton
