= Tel Aviv Ibex =

Tel Aviv Ibex RFC
- Full name: Tel Aviv Ibex Rugby Football Club
- Unions: Rugby Israel; International Gay Rugby
- Emblem: Nubian ibex
- Founded: 2021; 5 years ago
- Ground(s): Sportek Tel Aviv, Yarkon Park
- Coach(es): Michal Vaizman (2021/2022); Jeremy Schauder (2022- )

Largest win
- Bingham Cup Gladiator Plate (2024)

Official website
- www.ibexrfc.com

Tel Aviv Ibex (Hebrew: אייבקס תל אביב; Arabic: آيبكس تل ابيب) is a rugby union club based in Tel Aviv, Israel. It is the first and only LGBTQ+ inclusive men's rugby club in Western Asia.

== History ==
=== Foundation and name ===
The club was founded in 2021 with just ten players, most of whom had not played rugby before. One founding member later described to Mako News how as a school kid he was always "the student chosen last in sports lessons". The club was initially called the Tel Aviv Leviathans, later renaming, getting the new name from the desert-dwelling species of wild goat native to the Levant.

=== Subsequent chronology ===
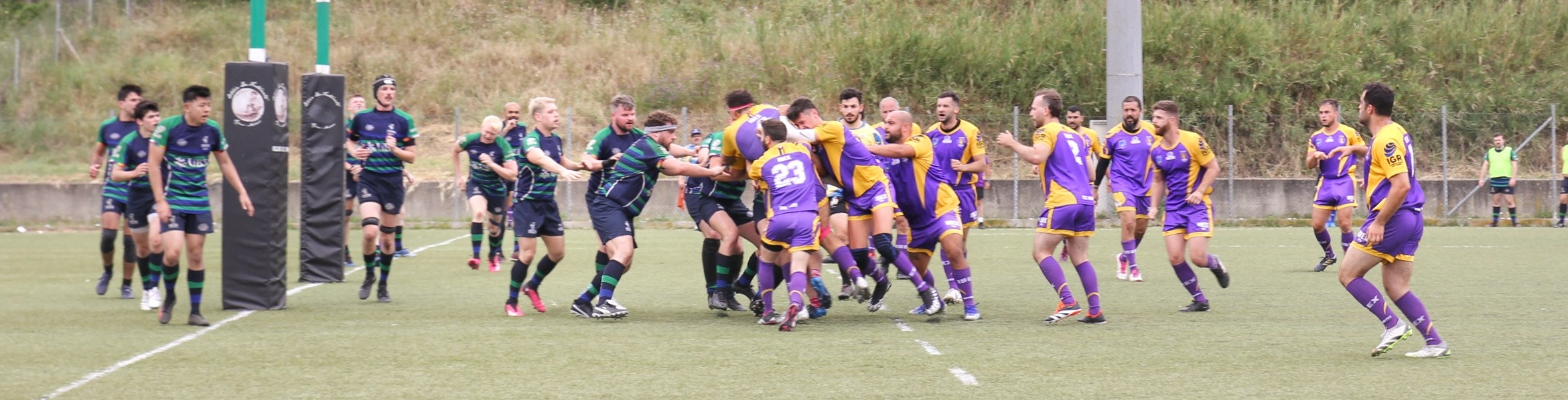
Playing against London's Kings Cross Steelers at Stadio del Rugby di Corviale in Rome, beating the Steelers 22-3

The club affiliated with the Academic Sports Association (ASA) in 2022, and in 2023 became a member of International Gay Rugby.

In April 2023 Ibex partnered with two other inclusive clubs — the Berkshire Unicorns and the Bristol Bisons — to compete at the Union Cup in Birmingham. Ibex contributed four players to a joint team playing under the Berkshire Unicorns banner.

In May 2023 the club won a national sevens tournament hosted by Yizre'el Rugby Club.

The club competed at the biennial Bingham Cup in Rome in May 2024, winning the Gladiator Plate against Orlando Otters RFC with a score of 19-5.

The team was expelled from the 2025 International Gay Rugby Union Cup tournament after the Oslo-based Norwegian team refused to play them, stating some members of the team served in the IDF, which is compulsory in Israel.

== Composition ==
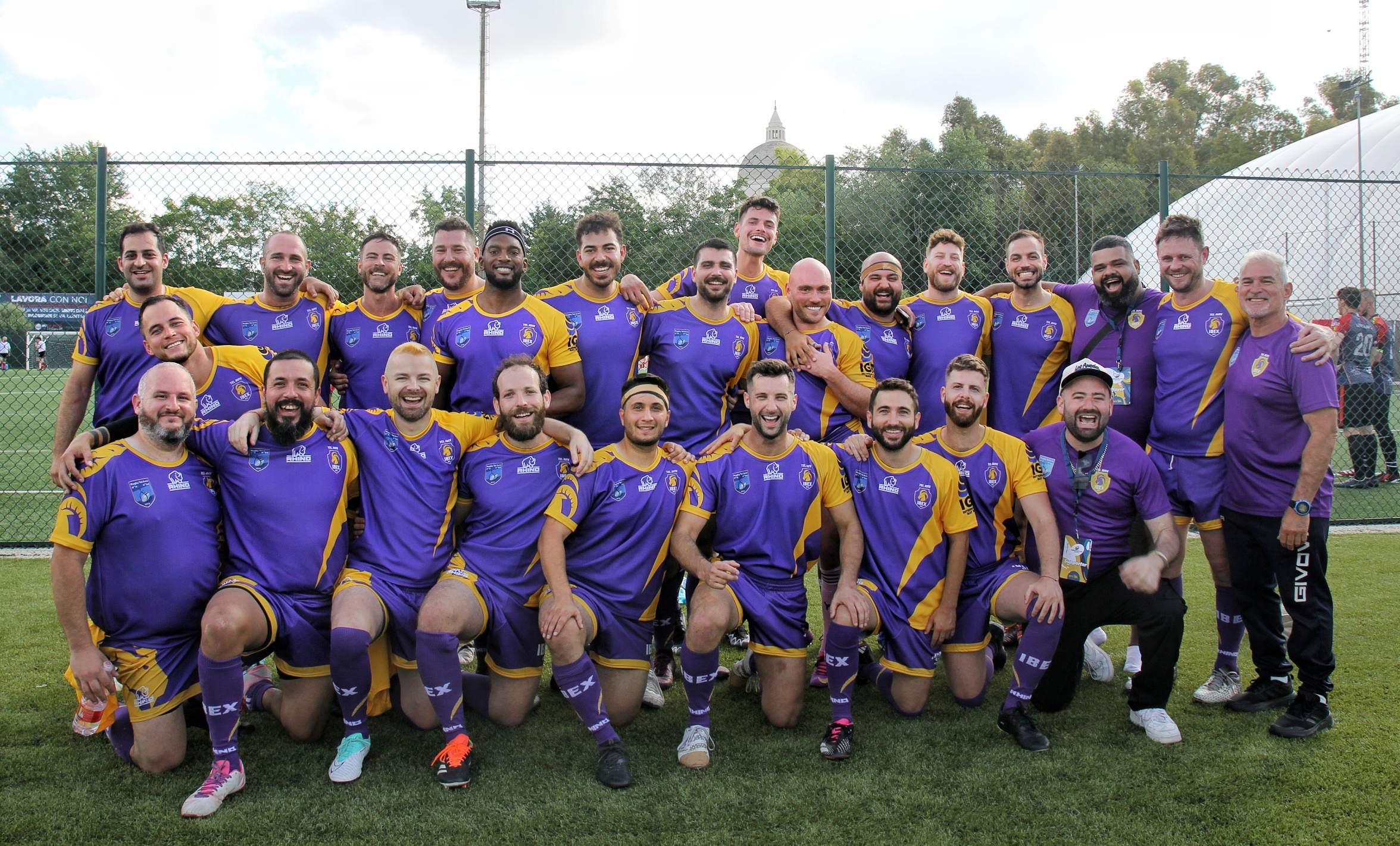
The club's Bingham Cup 2024 squad at Dabliu Eur Sport Club in Rome

Ibex players come from a variety of cultural backgrounds and sexual identities, including both members of the LGBTQ+ community and straight allies.

According to an i24NEWS news report on the club in June 2024, Ibex counts both Jewish Israelis and Palestinians amongst its team, with the report describing it as "a delicate coexistence that keeps politics off the rugby pitch, but forces the players to encounter viewpoints they might not otherwise hear".
