= Northern California Rugby Football Union =

Northern California Football Union
- Abbreviation: Northern California GU
- Formation: 2013
- Region served: California; Nevada, United States of America

The Northern California Rugby Football Union (NCRFU) is the Geographical Union (GU) for Adult rugby union teams in Northern California, as well as northern Nevada. The NCRFU is part of USA Rugby.

The NCRFU is traditionally one of the strongest unions in American rugby. Cal Men's Rugby has won over twenty Collegiate Division I national championships, and NCRFU member clubs Stanford Women's Rugby, the Hayward Griffins, the Berkeley All Blues, the Reno Zephyrs, Mission RFC, UCSC Women's Rugby, and the now defunct Old Blue RFC have all won national championships in their respective divisions. SFGG RFC is a perennial Rugby Super League playoff team, winning the national championship in 2009. The NCRFU also administers a large high school rugby division, from which Jesuit High School has won four national championships.

NCRFU select players are eligible to be selected for "Grizzly" Select Sides.

== Men's Club Teams ==
=== Division I ===
- East Palo Alto Razorbacks RFC (East Palo Alto, CA)
- Sacramento Lions RFC (Sacramento, CA)
- San Francisco Golden Gate RFC (San Francisco, CA)
- San Jose Seahawks (San Jose, CA)
- Fresno RFC (Fresno, CA)
- Santa Rosa Rugby Club (Santa Rosa, CA)

=== Division II ===
- Bay Area Baracus RFC (San Francisco, CA)
- Berkeley RFC (Berkeley, CA)
- Diablo Gaels RFC (Walnut Creek, CA)
- Marin REDS Rugby Club (Marin City, CA)
- Sacramento Capitals RFC (Sacramento, CA)
- Silicon Valley Rugby Football Club (Sunnyvale, CA)
- South Valley Bucks RFC (Morgan Hill, CA) - Defunct
- Vacaville RFC (Vacaville, CA)

=== Division III ===
- Aptos Beach Dog RFC (Aptos, CA)
- Arroyo Grande RFC (Arroyo Grande, CA)
- BA Chiefs RFC (San Francisco, CA)
- Chico Mighty Oaks (Chico, CA)
- Colusa County RFC (Colusa, CA)
- Humboldt Old Growth RFC(Humboldt, CA)
- Mendocino Steam Donkeys (Ukiah, CA)
- Paso Robles RFC (Paso Robles, CA)
- Redwood Empire RFC(Santa Rosa, CA)
- Reno Zephyrs RFC (Reno, NV)
- San Bruno Saints RFC (San Bruno, CA)
- San Francisco Fog RFC (San Francisco, CA)
- Shasta Highlanders RFC(Shasta, CA)
- Sierra Foothills RFC (Penryn, CA)
- Silicon Valley Rugby Football Club (Sunnyvale, CA)
- Stanislaus RFC (Modesto, CA)
- State of Jefferson RFC (Yreka, CA)
- Vallejo Barbarians RFC(Vallejo, CA)
- Washoe Wolves RFC (Reno, NV)

== Women's Club Teams ==
- Berkeley All Blues (Berkeley, CA)
- Sacramento Amazons (Sacramento, CA)
- San Francisco Golden Gate (San Francisco, CA)
- San Jose Seahawks Women's RFC (San Jose, CA)
- Silicon Valley Rugby Football Club (Sunnyvale, CA)

== Men's Collegiate Teams ==
=== Division I ===
- University of California, Santa Cruz
- UCSB
- Sacramento State University
- Santa Clara University
- Stanford University
- St. Mary's College of California
- University of California, Berkeley
- University of California, Davis

=== Division II ===
- California Maritime Academy
- Humboldt State University
- San Francisco State University (Gators Rugby Football Club)
- San Jose State University
- Santa Rosa Junior College
- Sierra College
- University of San Francisco
- California State University, Fresno
- University of the Pacific, Stockton*University of Nevada, Reno
- Sonoma State University

== Women's Collegiate Teams ==
=== Division I ===
- Chico State University
- Sacramento State University
- Stanford University
- University of California, Berkeley
- University of California, Davis
- University of Nevada, Reno

=== Division II ===
- Humboldt State University
- Santa Clara University
- St. Mary's College of California
- University of California, Santa Cruz
- San Jose State University

== Boy's High School/Youth Teams ==
=== Bay Conference ===
- Alameda Islanders Under 19 RFC, Alameda, CA
- Bellarmine College Prep (originally College Park)
- Berkeley Rhinos
- Bishop O'Dowd High School
- Danville Oaks RFC
- DeLaSalle High School
- Delta Youth
- Diablo Rugby Club
- Hayward Rugby Club
- Lamorinda Rugby Club
- Los Gatos Youth Rugby - defunct
- Marin Highlanders RFC
- North Bay Rugby Club - The Wildcats
- Oakland Military Institute
- Oakland Warthogs
- Piedmont International Touring Side
- Pleasanton Cavaliers
- San Francisco Golden Gate
- Santa Clara Youth Rugby - defunct
- Silicon Valley Rugby Football Club (Sunnyvale, CA)
- St. Francis High School Rugby

=== Redwood Empire Conference ===
- Elsie Allen High School (Santa Rosa, CA)
- Montgomery
- Rohnert Park Barbarians
- Santa Rosa
- Windsor
- Fortuna

=== Sacramento Valley Teams ===
- Center Parkway Harlequins
- Christian Brothers RFC
- CK McClatchy Rugby
- Cougar Rugby Club
- Elk Grove United Rugby Club
- Granite Bay Rugby Club ()
- Gridley Rugby
- Jesuit High School Rugby Club
- John F Kennedy High School Boys Rugby Club.
- Mother Lode RFC
- Sacramento Eagles Rugby Club
- SacPD PAL Rugby Club
- Sierra Foothills Rugby Club
- Solano-Yolo Rugby Club
- Vacaville ([Vacaville])

=== Skyhawk Conference (South Bay) ===
- Bellarmine College Preparatory (San Jose, CA)
- East Palo Alto Razorbacks (East Palo Alto, CA)
- Live Oak High School (Morgan Hill, CA)
- Peninsula Green Rugby (Redwood City, CA)
- Silicon Valley Rugby Football Club (Sunnyvale, CA) was *Silicon Valley Durabos ()
- San Mateo Warriors U19(San Mateo, CA)

== Girl's High School/Youth Teams ==
- Dixon High School, Dixon, CA
- Alameda Riptide Under 19, Alameda, CA
- American Youth Rugby Union, Mountain View, CA
- All Blues Berkeley Red Hawks (formerly Golden Star), Berkeley, CA
- Danville Oaks RFC
- Davis High School
- Bishop O'Dowd High School
- Fortuna High School
- Mother Lode RFC
- Sacramento Amazons u19
- Santa Rosa RFC
- Santa Clara Youth Rugby, Santa Clara County Youth Rugby, CA - Defunct
- Silicon Valley Rugby Football Club (Sunnyvale, CA)

== See also ==
- USA Rugby
- Rugby union in the United States
