= Berlin Bruisers =

German rugby union club, based in Berlin

- Union: International Gay Rugby Association and Board
- Nickname: Bruisers
- Founded: 2012; 14 years ago
- Location: Berlin, Germany
- Ground(s): Treptow, Neue Krugallee
- President: Ulrich Stadfeld
- Coach(es): Ailish Brennan, Rodolfo Antinoni, Timothée Prouvost
Team kit

Official website
- www.berlinbruisers.com

The Berlin Bruisers are a queer rugby union club based in Berlin, Germany. They were founded in 2012, and are the first team of its kind in Germany. Although they are a primarily queer rugby club, the club is open to anyone with an interest in playing rugby union and includes members of all sexualities and gender identities. The club is affiliated with International Gay Rugby.

The Berlin Bruisers have three teams:

- a team for men*, which until the season 2023/2024 used to play in the German Rugby-Regionalliga North-East. The team also participate in the Union Cup, and the Bingham Cup.

- a team for FLINTA* (Frauen, Lesben, Inter-, Nongender, Transgender und A-Gender-Personen), which plays in the Rugby-Regionalliga for 7s and participates to the SG Berlin

- a all gender Touch Rugby Teams, which takes part to international, national and regional tournaments.

== History ==
The Berlin Bruisers were founded in 2012 by Dave Egan. Their first training ground was at Tiergarten, and Tempelhofer Feld, with Michael Felts as coach.

The first match was a friendly game against the Emerald Warriors on 16 March 2013 at Tempelhofer Feld, and was lost 45–22.

Their first official match took place at Union Cup 2013 in Bristol against the Stockholm Berserkers.

They are also participated in the Union Cup (2013-Bristol, 2015-Brüssel, 2017-Madrid, 2019-Dublin, 2025 Oslo), and the Bingham Cup (2018-Amsterdam, 2024 Rom).

First trainings were at Tiergarten, Volkspark Friedrichshain and Tempelhofer Feld (coach: Michael Felts), later at Berliner Sport-Club (coach: Santiago Rubio, Rodolfo Antonini). During the season 2019/20, 2020/2021, 2021/2022 the Men* Team have formed a joint team with the second team of the Berlin Grizzlies (coach: Rodolfo Antonini 2019-2020 and then Michael Jackson). After that the team played one season without SG and then formed an SG with SC Siemenstadt (Coach Mattiu Peel). Since the season 2024/2025, they have been trained by Ailish Brennan.

The FLINTA-Team started during the season 2021/2022 in the Regionalliga for 7s Rugby. They formed with other berlin rugby clubs a joint team for Rugby XV. They are coached by Rodolfo Antonini.

The Touch-Team started 2023 and are coached by Timothée Prouvost.

The team trains in Treptow-Köpenick.

== Crest and colours ==
The club colours are dark violet and white. The team crest is a shield with a bandaged head in form of a rugby ball on shoulders.

== Bash About ==
Since 2014, the Berlin Bruisers have been organised a bi-annual barbarian rugby tournament in Berlin. At the first Bash About, Gareth Thomas, the Welsh and British Lions international was a guest coach.

Due to the COVID-19 pandemic, the Bash About tournament had to be cancelled in 2020.

== Documentary film ==
From 2016 to 2017 a documentary film about the Bruisers titled 'Tackling Life' was shot by Johannes List. It premiered in 2018, winning the Audience Award at Dok.fest München 2018 and Best Documentary at the First Steps Awards 2018 . The film was also shown at the Berlinale 2019 in the section Gast der Perspektive Deutsches Kino.

== Trivia ==
The Bruisers hold the Guinness World record for the most passes thrown per minute (237 Rugby ball passes in 3 Minutes).

In 2018 the Berlin Bruisers performed in the video for the CSD anthem by Maksim Reimer.

In 2019, the club was portrayed in a special edition of Meat Magazine.
