= Les Gaillards =

French rugby union club, based in Paris

- Full name: Les Gaillards Paris Rugby Club
- Nickname: Les Gaillards
- Founded: 2003; 23 years ago
- Location: Paris, France
- Chairman: Maxime Hazouard
- Coach(es): Quentin Romary; Maxence Blanc; Nicolas Carles; Astrid Beaussier; Hippolyte Mandagot
- Captain: David Guardiola
- League(s): FFSE Division 3 AFFR Division 3 IGR
Team kit

Les Gaillards Paris Rugby Club, also known as Les Gaillards Parisiens, is the first LGBT rugby team in France, created on 19 January 2004 and recognised as an association of general interest since 23 February 2023 by the Préfecture de Paris.

The association is a member of the Fédération sportive LGBT+ and of the International Gay Rugby Association and Board which has over 70 member clubs.

== History ==
=== Creation of the team and the name ===
"Les Gaillards" came into being informally during April 2003 through a discussion on Yahoo Groups, which allows the creation of web forums based on discussion topics. Fans of rugby union, all homosexuals, met on a forum to share their difficulties in practising the sport in a context of homophobia, experienced by several of them.

Les Gaillards set themselves the goal of creating a collective that would enable members to play amateur rugby without suffering discrimination based on sexual orientation or gender. Anyone over the age of majority may join the group.

The Gaillards' first training session took place in the Bois de Vincennes on 1 November 2003.

=== Declaration to the Prefecture and first tournaments ===
The "Les Gaillards Parisiens" association was registered with the Paris Prefecture on 29 January 2004, following the Constitutive Assembly held in Vincennes on 24 January 2004, with the aim of entering the AFFR championships for the Île-de-France region and the IGR. The same year, the association took part in the Bingham Cup in London.

From 5 to 7 May 2005, Montpellier's newly-formed LGBT team, Los Valents in collaboration with the IGR, organised the first Union Cup, in which Les Gaillards took part (3rd place).

In February 2007, the "Les Gaillards" brand and logo were registered with the INPI.

=== 2020's ===
The COVID-19 pandemic and the ban on gatherings following the confinement of March 19, 2020 decided by the President of the French Republic Emmanuel Macron interrupted the sports seasons of associations and clubs in France.

A new coaching team will join the association from September 2021, under the direction of Thibault Le Maistre. The same year, to respond to an increasingly strong demand from members, a Touch' rugby section was created to allow the practice of contactless rugby.

In August 2022, "Les Gaillards" is the only French team to participate in the Bingham Cup in Ottawa, a global tournament organized by the IGR and bringing together 45 inclusive teams. The Gaillards join the 4th division because it is forbidden for French rugby teams to engage in scrums. The IGR, taking note of this constraint, therefore demoted the Gaillards and imposed a game of 14 against 15 on them. Despite this, the team won all those matches and reached the final stages of the 3rd division and won the Hoagland Bowl.

To mark the 15th anniversary of the team "Les Coqs festifs", another inclusive rugby team based in Paris, the "Festive Cup" is organized at the Marcoussis national rugby center, in partnership with the French Rugby Federation. The tournament, taking place over one day, brings together several French and European teams and sees "Les Gaillards" win all the matches played.

In April 2023, in Birmingham, the new session of the Union Cup took place. Initially scheduled for 2021, the tournament was postponed several times due to the COVID-19 pandemic, making the practice of rugby and international travel too restrictive. "Les Gaillards", for the first time in their history, are sending two teams to represent this tournament. A female delegation is also present for the first time. At the end of 3 days of the tournament, team 1 of the Gaillards won the "Mercian Cup", rewarding the best team in the 2nd division of the tournament. Team 2 finished 4th in the 3rd division.

On the occasion of the Rugby World Cup which takes place in France from September 8, 2023, Cyril Leroy, founding member of the Gaillards, brings the ball from the France-New Zealand opening match to the Stade de France. This sequence would like to salute its commitment to the inclusion of LGBT+ in sport and the creation of the first inclusive rugby team in France. The magazine Têtu devotes an article to the team in its September 2023 edition.

On September 20, 2023, MP Jean-Carles Grellier officially presents the medal of honor of the National Assembly during a meeting around inclusiveness in sport, in the presence of MP Véronique Riotton and MP Belkhir Beladdad.

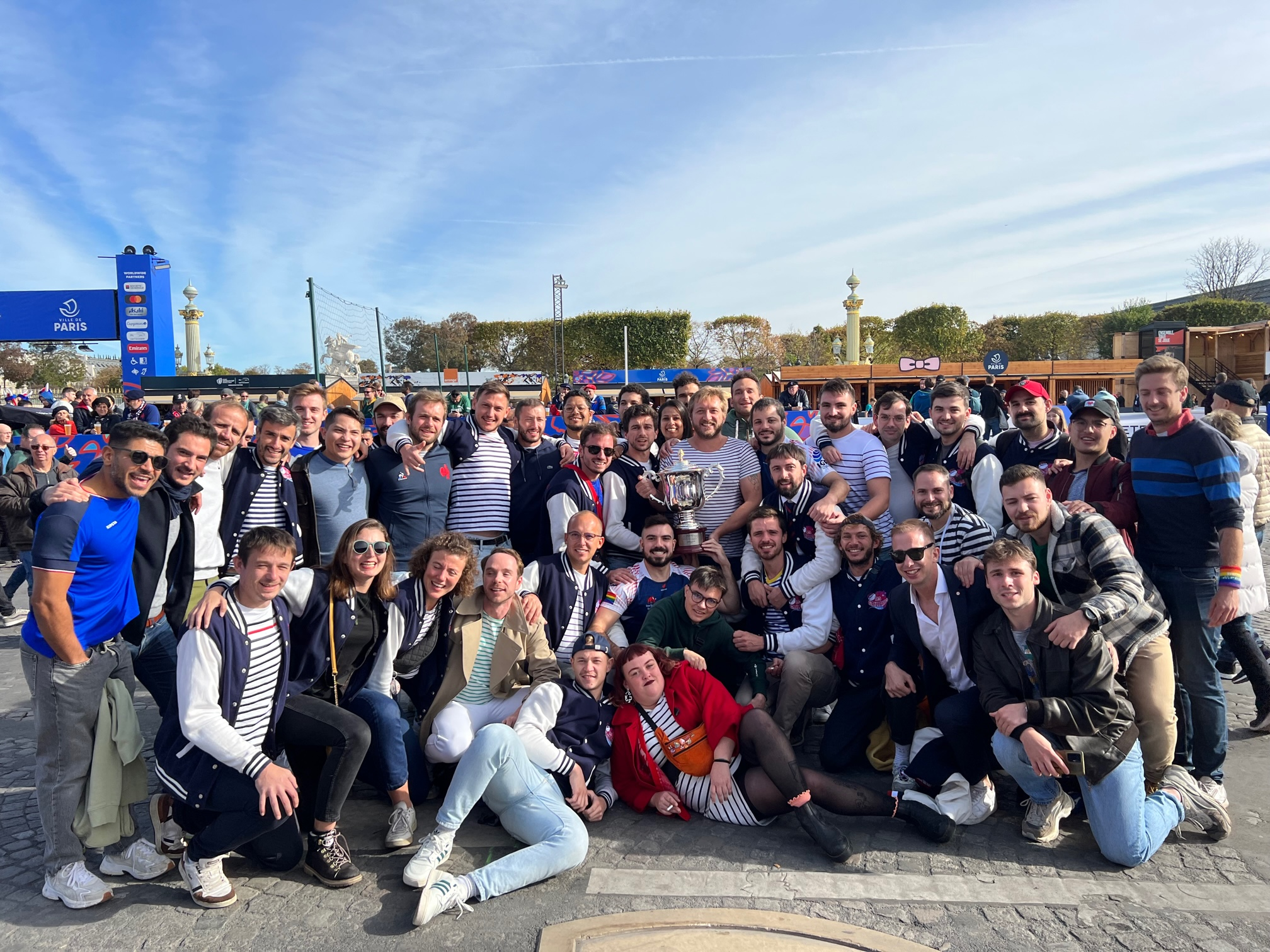
Les Gaillards and "Pride Rugby Cup", Paris, 15th October 2023

On Saturday October 14, 2023, World Rugby, France 2023, the FFR, the National Rugby League and the CADET (Anti-Discrimination and Equal Treatment Commission, internal commission at FFR) are organizing a tournament bringing together at the Marcoussis national rugby center, 8 inclusive European teams (4 French and 4 foreign) to highlight the work of teams and associations fighting against homophobia and discrimination in rugby. Les Gaillards won the tournament by beating the London Stags in the final. The trophy, a replica of the Webb Ellis trophy, was presented the next day to the rugby village at Place de la Concorde, in Paris, from the hands of the Minister of Sports Amélie Oudéa-Castera.
