= Muddy York RFC =

(Canada) Muddy York RFC
- Full name: Toronto Muddy York Rugby Football Club
- Unions: Rugby Canada; International Gay Rugby
- Nickname: Muddy
- Founded: 2003
- Region: Rugby Ontario
- Ground(s): Sunnybrook Park, Toronto, Ontario, Canada
- President: Eddy Sutton
- Coach: Mike Blakey

Official website
- www.muddyyork.ca

The Toronto Muddy York Rugby Football Club is a Canadian rugby union team based in Toronto. Muddy York RFC was Toronto's first amateur gay team and Canada's second inclusive rugby team. The team is open to players of any sexual orientation and gender. Muddy York was founded by Dave Galbraith in 2003, and is a member of Rugby Ontario and International Gay Rugby organizations.

== Name and Coat of Arms ==
"Toronto Muddy York", a reference to a historical nickname for Toronto. The team colors – navy blue and canary yellow – come from both the City of Toronto's coat of arms and the Rugby School in Warwickshire, where the game was created in 1823. Blue symbolizes tradition, loyalty, unity, and strength; while yellow symbolizes success, athletic achievements, and joy.

== Competitions ==
Muddy has held an inaugural tournament called the Dirty Rugger Tournament, which houses the Beaver Bowl cup since 2009. They have played in the Bi-Yearly Bingham cup since New York in 2006 every time

== Outside of Rugby ==
The Gay Who Wasn't Gay Enough is a YouTube video that has surpassed 500k views. Muddy York was involved in a photo series called Boys will be Boys by Giovanni Capriotti. It won first in sports at the 2017 World Press Photo of the Year awards and the series was displayed at Bingham 2018 Amsterdam. Was featured on an episode of the 3rd season of 1 queen 5 queers.

== Club Presidents and Commissioners ==
- 2003 - Dave Galbraith
- 2004 - Marc Charrier
- 2005-2006 - Mike Cole
- 2007 - Oliver S
- 2008-2009 - Brandon Taylor
- 2010-2013 - James McCabe
- 2014-2016 - John Jeffries
- 2017-2018 - Omar Aljebouri
- 2019 - Neil Littlejohns
- 2020-2021 - Ian Michado Royer
- 2022 - Quinton Leduc
- 2023-2024 - Kevin Joseph
- 2025 - Paul Avery
- 2026 - Eddy Sutton
