= International Gay Rugby =

Umbrella organisation for rugby clubs

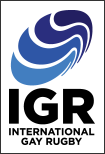
Official logo

International Gay Rugby (IGR), founded in 2000, formerly known as the International Gay Rugby Association and Board (IGRAB), is the umbrella organisation for the world's gay and inclusive rugby clubs. Based in London, UK, IGR is recognised by World Rugby as the representative organisation of the LGBT and inclusive rugby community, up to the point they both have signed a Memorandum of Understanding outlining a commitment between the two organisations to work together to educate and eliminate homophobia in rugby.

Also, IGR provides its member clubs with development support and resources in the areas of club organisation, recruitment, retention, fundraising, event management, and regional and national union relations. IGR ensures the regular celebration of the Bingham Cup, the biennial world championships of gay and inclusive rugby, as well as the Union Cup, the European tournament and NORAM, the North American tournament.

== Member clubs ==
As of May 2021 IGR lists 94 gay and inclusive rugby clubs as members.

=== Africa ===
==== South Africa ====
- Jozi Cats, Johannesburg

=== Asia ===
==== Israel ====
- Tel Aviv Ibex RFC (formerly Tel Aviv Leviathans RFC), Tel Aviv

==== Japan ====
- Osaka Rugby, Osaka
- Tokyo Tyrants Rugby Club, Tokyo

=== Europe ===
==== Austria ====
- Vienna Eagles RFC, Vienna

==== Belgium ====
- Brussels Straffe Ketten, Brussels

==== Denmark ====
- Copenhagen Wolves RFC, Copenhagen

==== England ====
- Berkshire Unicorn, Maidenhead, Berkshire
- Birmingham Bulls, Birmingham, West Midlands
- Brighton & Hove Sea Serpents, Brighton & Hove, Sussex
- Bristol Bisons, Bristol
- Chester Centurions, Chester, Cheshire
- Colchester Kings, Colchester, Essex
- Coventry Corsairs, Coventry, West Midlands
- Derby Raiders, Derby, Derbyshire
- Hull Roundheads, Hull, Yorkshire
- Kings Cross Steelers, London
- Leeds Hunters, Leeds, Yorkshire
- Liverpool Tritons, Liverpool, Merseyside
- The London Stags, London
- Manchester Village Spartans, Manchester
- Newcastle Ravens, Newcastle upon Tyne, Tyne & Wear
- Northampton Outlaws, Northampton, Northamptonshire
- Reading Renegades, Reading, Berkshire
- Sheffield Vulcans, Sheffield, Yorkshire
- Typhoons RUFC, Preston, Lancashire
- Westcountry Wasps RFC, Teignmouth, Devon (Devon's first LGBTQ+ Inclusive rugby club)
- Wessex Wyverns, Southampton, Hampshire
- The Worcester Saxons RFC, Worcestershire
- York R I Templars, York, Yorkshire

==== Scotland ====
- Caledonian Thebans, Edinburgh
- Glasgow Raptors, Glasgow
- Aberdeen Taexali, Aberdeen
- Dunfermline Knights, Dunfermline

France

- Les Coqs Festifs, Paris
- Les Gaillards, Paris
- Los Valents de Montpellier, Montpellier
- Rebelyons, Lyon
- Tou'Win, Toulouse

==== Greece ====
- Athenian Centaurs RFC, Athens

==== Ireland ====
- Belfast Azlans, Belfast, Northern Ireland
- Cork Hellhounds, Cork, Ireland
- Emerald Warriors, Dublin, Ireland

==== Italy ====
- Libera Rugby, Rome
- Raccoons Rugby Roma, Rome

==== Germany ====
- Berlin Bruisers, Berlin
- Cologne Crushers, Cologne, North Rhine-Westphalia
- Munich Monks, Munich, Bavaria

==== Netherlands ====
- ARC Lowlanders, Amsterdam

==== Norway ====
- Oslo Raballders RUFC, Oslo

==== Portugal ====
- Lisbon Dark Horses, Lisbon

==== Scotland ====
- Caledonian Thebans, Edinburgh
- Glasgow Raptors, Glasgow
- Dunfermline Knights, Dunfermline
- Aberdeen Taexali, Aberdeen

==== Spain ====
- Madrid Titanes, Madrid
- Barcelona Panteres, Barcelona

==== Sweden ====
- Stockholm Berserkers RFC, Stockholm

==== Wales ====
- Cardiff Lions, Cardiff
- Swansea Vikings, Swansea
- Wrecsam Rhinos, Wrexham

=== North America ===
==== Canada ====
- Armada Montréal, Montreal, Quebec
- Ottawa Wolves, Ottawa, Ontario
- Toronto Muddy York, Toronto, Ontario
- Vancouver Rogues, Vancouver, British Columbia

==== Mexico ====
- Mexico City Spicy Barbarians, Mexico City

==== United States ====
- Atlanta Bucks, Atlanta, Georgia
- Baltimore Flamingos, Baltimore, Maryland
- Boston Ironsides, Boston, Massachusetts
- Charleston Blockade, Charleston, South Carolina
- Charlotte Royals, Charlotte, North Carolina
- Chicago Dragons, Chicago, Illinois
- Colorado Rush, Denver, Colorado
- Columbus Coyotes, Columbus, Ohio
- Columbus Kodiaks, Columbus, Ohio
- Crescent City Rougaroux, New Orleans, Louisiana
- Dallas Diablos, Dallas, Texas
- Dallas Lost Souls, Dallas, Texas
- Gotham Knights, New York City, New York
- Los Angeles Rebellion, Los Angeles, California
- Madison Minotaurs, Madison, Wisconsin
- Milwaukee Beer Barons, Milwaukee, Wisconsin
- Minneapolis Mayhem, Minneapolis, Minnesota
- Nashville Grizzlies, Nashville, Tennessee
- Orlando Otters, Orlando, Florida
- Philadelphia Gryphons, Philadelphia, Pennsylvania
- Phoenix Storm, Phoenix, Arizona
- Portland Lumberjacks, Portland, Oregon
- San Diego Armada, San Diego, California
- San Francisco Fog, San Francisco, California
- Seattle Quake, Seattle, Washington
- Space City Rugby, Houston, Texas
- St. Louis Crusaders, St. Louis, Missouri
- Village Lions RFC, New York, NY
- Washington Renegades, Washington, DC
- Washington Scandals, Washington, DC

=== South America ===
==== Argentina ====
- Ciervos Pampas Rugby Club, Buenos Aires
- Huarpes Rugby Club, Mendoza
- Ruda Macho Rugby, Buenos Aires

==== Chile ====
- Titanes Rugby Club, Santiago

=== Oceania ===
==== Australia ====
- Adelaide University Sharks, Adelaide, South Australia
- Brisbane Hustlers, Brisbane, Queensland
- Melbourne Chargers, Melbourne, Victoria
- Perth Rams, Perth, Western Australia
- Sydney Convicts, Sydney, New South Wales

==== New Zealand ====
- New Zealand Falcons, Auckland

=== International ===
- International Society of Inclusive Rugby Referees
- IGR World Barbarians

== See also ==
- Mark Kendall Bingham Memorial Tournament
- Bingham Cup
- Union Cup
- LGBT community
