= Alice Hoagland =

American flight attendant and activist

- Hoagland in 2014
- Born: c. 1949
- Died: December 22, 2020 (aged 71); Los Gatos, California, U.S.
- Education: Brigham Young University
- Occupation: Flight attendant
- Known for: Aviation security, LGBT rights, rugby activism (2001-2020)
- Children: Mark Bingham

Alice Hoagland (c. 1949 – December 22, 2020) was an American flight attendant and activist. Following the death of her son, Mark Bingham, aboard United Airlines Flight 93 during the September 11 attacks, she dedicated herself to advocacy for aviation security, LGBT rights, counter-terrorism efforts, and competitive youth sports.

== Early life and education ==
Hoagland grew up in Iowa and Ohio. She was baptized as a Mormon at the age of 15 and attended Brigham Young University. She left the church in the late 1970s after its leaders opposed the Equal Rights Amendment.

== Career and advocacy ==
Hoagland worked as a flight attendant for 20 years.

In 1991, her son, rugby player Mark Bingham, came out to her as gay. Hoagland became a supportive parent and later credited him with teaching her how to live.

On September 11, 2001, her son called her from United Airlines Flight 93 and left a voicemail saying he loved her. As a former flight attendant, she later reflected that she had wanted to advise him to stay seated and avoid drawing attention. Despite this, she called back and left voicemails on his cell phone telling him and fellow passengers to attempt to overpower the hijackers.

Following his death in the attack, Hoagland dedicated herself to advocacy for improved aviation security, counter-terrorism efforts, LGBT rights, and competitive youth sports.

In 2002, she was among the Flight 93 family members who listened to the cockpit voice recording of the flight's final minutes. That same year, she carried forward her son's athletic legacy by attending the first Mark Kendall Bingham Memorial Tournament, becoming a figure in the international gay rugby movement.

In November 2008, Hoagland was selected by the Pentagon lottery as one of the first relatives permitted to observe the military commission trials of accused 9/11 conspirators at Guantánamo Bay. That same month, she spoke at a rally opposing California Proposition 8 in San Jose and participated in planning meetings for further same-sex marriage advocacy.

Hoagland was a regular presence at subsequent rugby tournaments, including the 2012 Bingham Cup in Manchester, England. International Gay Rugby named one of its prizes the Hoagland Cup in her honor, first awarded at the 2016 tournament. Also in 2016, she publicly supported efforts allowing 9/11 victims' families to sue Saudi Arabia over alleged involvement in the attacks.

Her life and advocacy were chronicled in Jon Barrett's 2002 book Hero of Flight 93: Mark Bingham, the television movie Flight 93, an episode of Real Sports With Bryant Gumbel, and the documentary The Rugby Player.

== Personal life ==
By 2008, Hoagland lived in Redwood Estates, California.

Hoagland had Addison's disease. She died at her home in Los Gatos, California, on December 22, 2020, at the age of 71.
