= San Francisco Fog RFC =

American rugby union football club

(United States) San Francisco Fog RFC
- Full name: San Francisco Fog Rugby Football Club
- Union: USA Rugby; Northern California Rugby Football Union
- Nickname: Fog
- Founded: 2000
- Ground(s): Crocker Amazon Fields, San Francisco, California, USA
- President: Zackary Forcum

Official website
- www.fogrugby.com

San Francisco Fog Rugby Football Club (RFC), also known as "The Fog", is a rugby union football club in San Francisco, California. It is the first such team in the western United States established specifically to actively reach out to traditionally under-represented groups in rugby, such as people of color, gay men, and women. It welcomes players who do not fit into those categories. The club has over 100 members.

== Origins ==
The club was conceived by Derrick Mickle in April 2000, upon learning of the success of the Washington Renegades RFC, established in October 1998 as the first gay/inclusive ruby club in the United States. Through an outreach effort, he recruited the assistance of Cameron Geddes and Bryce Eberhart to help found and start the club. All three had played for their college rugby teams and leveraged their experiences to shape the direction and serious purpose of the club.

With the unexpected financial backing of an anonymous donor in summer 2000, the club's organizing efforts accelerated in August and September 2000. The club had its first practice with nine players on October 14, 2000. Later that month, the club teamed up with other gay and bisexual rugby union teams worldwide to create International Gay Rugby (IGR) in October 2000, with the Fog as a founding member club. Originally called the International Gay Rugby Association and Board (IGRAB), IGR is currently recognised by World Rugby as the representative organization of the LGBT and inclusive rugby community, up to the point they both have signed a Memorandum of Understanding outlining a commitment between the two organizations to work together to educate and eliminate homophobia in rugby.

The Fog formally incorporated as a non-profit organization in the State of California soon after, with Mickle, Geddes and Eberhart as its first elected officers. Mickle served as president for the club's first two years and was the driving organizational force behind running the club during those initial years.

The club started from an enviable foundation of solid financial resources; a critical mass of players with prior rugby experience; and an experienced coach skilled at developing new players who had little-to-no team sports experience. As word spread through San Francisco's gay community, the club quickly added players. The club was 40+ players strong, including a handful of non-gay players, when it was admitted to the Northern California Rugby Football Union in spring 2001 with a unanimous vote. The club had its first union match against the Bay Area Barracus on April 7, 2001, one year after the club's conception. The club joined regular Division III union play, in the fall of 2001. The club observed its 20th anniversary on October 14, 2020.

== Mark Bingham ==
Perhaps the Fog's most famous member was Mark Bingham, who joined the club in February 2001. Bingham had been a rugby player since his teenage years, and played on the rugby team at the University of California, Berkeley, a team consistently rated among of the best collegiate rugby teams in the United States.

Derrick Mickle first met Mark Bingham and Jason Reimuller in fall 1998 while playing on a gay flag football team in San Francisco. The three bonded over their shared experience playing rugby in college. Bored with flag football, the three had a discussion pondering what it would be like to play for a gay rugby team, unaware of the existence of the Washington Renegades, the London Kings Cross Steelers, the Ponsonby Heroes (Auckland, New Zealand), and the Manchester Village Spartans (Manchester, England, United Kingdom). Mickle kept in touch with the two over the next couple of years, and reached out to them when the club started practices. Bingham and Reimuller eventually joined the club a few months after the club's first practices. Like all team members who joined the Fog in its first year, Bingham is considered a founding member of the team. Although Bingham had no formal leadership role in the club and was not involved in the organizing efforts to start the club, his charismatic leadership; hard-hitting, but supportive and encouraging playing style; and elevated level of play were a source of aspiration and inspiration for his teammates.

In May 2001, the Washington Renegades hosted an IGRAB International Invitational for gay rugby union teams in Washington D.C., United States. The event was officially a rugby sevens tournament among the existing IGR teams at the time. In addition to the tournament, there were exhibition rugby union (XVs) matches. In the exhibition match between the Fog and the Renegades, the two played against each other for the first time in a XVs match. The Fog won 19–0. Bingham was a critical player for the team, and instrumental to the Fog's wins during the tournament.

By summer 2001, Bingham was planning to move his public relations business to New York City in fall 2001 and relocated there himself permanently. Inspired by the success of the Fog, Bingham connected with Scott Glaessgen, a rugby player and local in New York City. The two made plans to start an inclusive rugby club there after Bingham's move. It was on his way back from a planning/business trip to New York City that Bingham became one of the heroes of the September 11, 2001 attacks on the United States. Bingham is believed to have been among the passengers to storm the cockpit of Flight 93, which was downed in Shanksville, Pennsylvania. Some speculate the plane's destination was the U.S. Capitol building. Bingham was 31.

Carrying on with Bingham's intention, Glaessgen went on to recruit others to found the Gotham Knights, New York City's gay/inclusive rugby club.

In the months following the events of September 11, 2001, the club was the focus of much media attention. Significantly, the team was profiled on HBO's Real Sports with Bryant Gumbel in a segment that aired October 16, 2001. The segment, "Good Sports, Good Men", reported by Mary Carillo and produced by Nick Dolin, is a very personal look at Bingham's relationship with the San Francisco Fog as a member of the club. The title is taken from Bingham's email to the team upon acceptance to the Northern California Rugby Football Union in spring 2001. Given his years playing rugby, Bingham was highly skeptical the union would accept a predominantly gay rugby team. In his email to the team, Bingham wrote: "We need to work harder. We need to get better...We have the chance to be role models for other gay folks who wanted to play sports, but never felt good enough or strong enough. More importantly, we have the chance to show the other teams in the league that we are as good as they are. Good rugby players. Good partiers. Good sports. Good men."

In October 2001, the San Francisco Fog successfully lobbied IGR for the right to put on the Bingham Cup tournament, a XVs rugby tournament in San Francisco in June 2002. Eight teams traveled to San Francisco during Pride weekend of June 28–29, 2002 to compete over two days with the Fog coming out on top as the Cup's first winners. The event was held in San Francisco's Golden Gate Park. It was organized by Chris Zerlaut, who secured sponsorship from Nike and Guinness. The tournament was covered by press from around the world, including ESPN. The event was profiled in a two-page article in Rugby World magazine. The Fog A side emerged undefeated, defeating the London Kings Cross Steelers 27–5 in the final. Alice Hoagland, Mark Bingham's mom, presented the Fog with the trophy.

The media publicity surrounding Bingham's death had a profound impact on the development gay/inclusive rugby clubs, a movement Bingham's death was a catalyst for setting into motion. On top of the many books, movies, television segments and articles about Bingham himself, the Bingham Cup tournament itself has been the subject of numerous documentaries and press articles. Hoagland became a 9/11 activist and, perhaps unexpectedly, a "gay-rugby godmother" and beloved figure of the gay rugby movement. She presented the cup to the winners of every staged Bingham Cup until her death December 22, 2020 at age 71.

== Competitions ==
The men's side competes seasonally in Division III of the Northern California Rugby Football Union (NCRFU), a division of USA Rugby. It competes in the International Gay Rugby (IGR) season. Within IGR, the club competes every two years for the Bingham Cup, winning the first two tournaments in 2002 (San Francisco, California, United States) and 2004 (London, England). Other tournaments the team competes in include Scrum by the Sea, Seattle Magnitude XVs, and the Wild West Rugby Fest.

The women's side competes seasonally in Division I of the Pacific Coast Rugby Football Union, and in tournaments such as the Chico Holiday Classic and the Champagne Classic.

== Coat of arms ==
After a trip to London and Manchester in January 2001, Pete Arden developed the club's coat of arms, a link to—and reminder of—the culture in which the game originated. The team's coat of arms consists of three silver stars within a black diagonal stripe on a wavy blue-and-silver background. In heraldry terms, the coat of arms is blazoned "barry nebuly of six argent and azure, on a bend sable three mullets of the first".

The coat of arms elements represent various aspects of the club. The patterned background is called barry nebuly, and is often taken to represent clouds, water, or air, suitable for a team named after San Francisco's most famous meteorological phenomenon. The stars (or "mullets") stand for the club's three constituencies: the players, the coaching staff, and the supporters.

In 2007, the American Heraldry Society's Fall 2007 Design Award was made to the San Francisco Fog Rugby Football Club for its distinctive coat of arms. The Society's Design Award is awarded twice yearly in the spring and fall for excellence in heraldic design.

== Community outreach ==
The club is well known in the San Francisco rugby community for sponsoring free "Rugby 101" beginner's clinics, where people who have never played rugby before can try out the game. The club also publishes a guide to fundamentals and another on how to buy a kit for a new player. The San Francisco Fog also promote the culture of rugby by making available many traditional rugby songs and the socials form an important part of the atmosphere of the club.

== See also ==
- Sports in the San Francisco Bay Area
