= Gotham Knights (rugby union) =

US rugby union club, based in New York

(United States) Gotham Knights RFC
- Full name: Gotham Knights Rugby Football Club
- Union: USA Rugby; Metropolitan New York Rugby Union
- Nickname: Knights
- Founded: 2001
- Ground(s): Randalls Island, Manhattan, New York City, USA

Official website
- www.gothamrfc.org

The Gotham Knights Rugby Football Club is a division III men's club in the Metropolitan New York Rugby Union. Their home pitch is on Randalls Island in Manhattan. The team finished fourth in the 2012 Bingham Cup, an international gay rugby tournament, coming off a 2010 win in Minneapolis.

== History ==
Gotham Knights RFC is New York's entry to the growing worldwide ranks of multiethnic and non-discriminatory rugby union teams worldwide. Following in the tradition of International Gay Rugby Association and Board teams like Kings Cross Steelers in England in 1995 and the San Francisco Fog RFC and the Washington Renegades in 2000, recent part-time New York City business owner and resident, Mark Bingham, discussed with local rugby player Scott Glaessgen how to form a New York team. Their plans were cut short by the terrorist attacks on September 11, 2001 when Bingham was killed in the crash of United Airlines Flight 93 in rural Pennsylvania.

The inspiration of Bingham’s life, work, and dedication to the sport of rugby led Glaessgen and other New York City rugby players to meet in late 2001 to establish Gotham Knights RFC. Practices started in December 2001 and continued in the cold, early months of 2002 under difficult pitch conditions, but within weeks the membership grew exponentially. By late February, the team had elected Toby Butterfield as its first president, a board of directors, incorporated as a New York State not-for-profit corporation, ordered equipment, decided team colors and applied for membership in the Met New York Rugby Union.

The club invited Australian Geoff Quinn to be its first head coach for fall 2002. In 2003, Steven Cain became head coach with assistance from Harold Bahr, who took over as head coach from fall 2003 until fall 2006, when players Keiran Lanham and Callum Sigg shared the head coaching responsibility. In 2007, Peter Rizzo became head coach until his departure for Brisbane, Australia in 2008. Spencer Blake stepped into the breach as a player-coach in fall 2008. Jeff Simpson was head coach during a period of team rebuilding in 2009. Philippose Kyriacou became head coach in late 2009. Lenny Pereira became Gotham's head coach for 2011. Gotham's longtime assistant coach Bob Hoban has been with the club since 2002, joined at times by Bob Murphy, Tony Buzzeo, Jeff Simpson, John Dent and others. Currently, Lawrence Blaber, Jr. ("Junior"), a former New York Rugby Club Assistant Coach, serves as Gotham's head coach.

Gotham's first A-side Captain in 2002 was Scott Glaessgen, followed in 2003 by Stace Houk. Luke Martland became captain in Fall 2003, followed for several years by Joe Rice. Keiran Lanham became captain in 2006, followed in 2008 by John Bockwoldt, Eric Di Palma in 2009, Joe Hunt in 2010, and Miguel Hammond in 2011. Joe Hunt held the title of Team Captain going into the Spring 2013 Season.

Toby Butterfield remained as president until 2004, and went on to join the board of Met New York Rugby, becoming its president in 2008. Gotham's president in 2004 and 2005 was Adam Josephs. Alex Fallis was president in 2006 and 2007. ames Bain was president in 2008. John Vernon was president in 2009. Yacov Braunstein became president in January 2010. Longtime player Jon Morgan held the Gotham President position for 2011 and 2012.

Every November from 2002 through 2008, the Knights hosted the East Coast Rugby Invitational, at first featuring both traditional and predominantly gay rugby teams from across eastern North America, and later incorporating college teams.

The Knights were the host team for the 2006 Bingham Cup held over Memorial Day weekend. 29 teams from 22 clubs in 6 countries participated in various divisions, including the Bingham Cup's first ever Women's division. The Knights advanced to the quarterfinal round of the 2004 Bingham Cup held in London and were runners up for the Bingham Plate that year. In 2006, the Knights advanced to the semifinal round of the Cup division, finishing 4th place in the top division, and the B side placed 4th in the Plate division.

In the Fall 2007 Union season, the Knights finished 2nd in the Union—the first time a predominantly gay team has reached the championship finals in the MetNY Rugby Union. They competed in the Territorial Playoffs in April, 2008, where there were defeated by the South Buffalo Thugs.

In June 2008, the Knights traveled to Dublin, Ireland to compete in the 2008 Bingham Cup. Gotham competed in the premiere Cup division, emerging as the top US side. In pool play, the Knights easily dispatched the Boston Ironsides (50 – 0) and San Francisco Fog’s B-Side (39 – 0), but lost a close match to the Kings Cross Steelers' A-side, which placed second overall (8-16). In the knockout rounds, Gotham defeated perennial rival Washington Renegades (10-0), but lost a hard-fought semifinal match to eventual world champion Sydney Convicts (10-35; notably, the Knights were the only team to score a try against the Convicts in the tournament). In the consolation final, the Knights beat the San Francisco Fog’s A-side (8-5) in dramatic fashion, with the winning try scored on the last play of the match. The win clinched the Knights third overall in the tournament and earned them bragging rights as the best gay rugby team in North America at that time.

Gotham has as an annual fundraiser their Bachelor Auction. In 2009 the Knights issued their first calendar featuring their own players.

In 2010 the Gotham Knights A-side won the Bingham Cup in Minneapolis, Minnesota. The Gotham B-side placed 2nd in the Crest division winning 4 of their 6 scheduled matches, only losing by 2 points in the final against the Phoenix Storm. At the 2012 Bingham Cup held in Manchester, England, Gotham Knights A-side finished 4th place losing to San Francisco Fog in the semi-final.

In 2016, Gotham Knights A defeated Kings Cross Steelers A to claim the Bingham Plate while Gotham Knights B, combining with the Stockholm Berserkers, were runners up to the Chicago Dragons B for the Challenger Julep.
