= Bingham Cup =

Rugby union competition

The Mark Kendall Bingham Memorial Tournament or the Bingham Cup is a biennial international, non-professional, gay rugby union tournament, first held in 2002. It is named after Mark Bingham, who died on board United Airlines Flight 93 when it crashed during the September 11, 2001 attacks. The most recent tournament was held in Brisbane, Australia in August 2026 and was won by English team King's Cross Steelers.

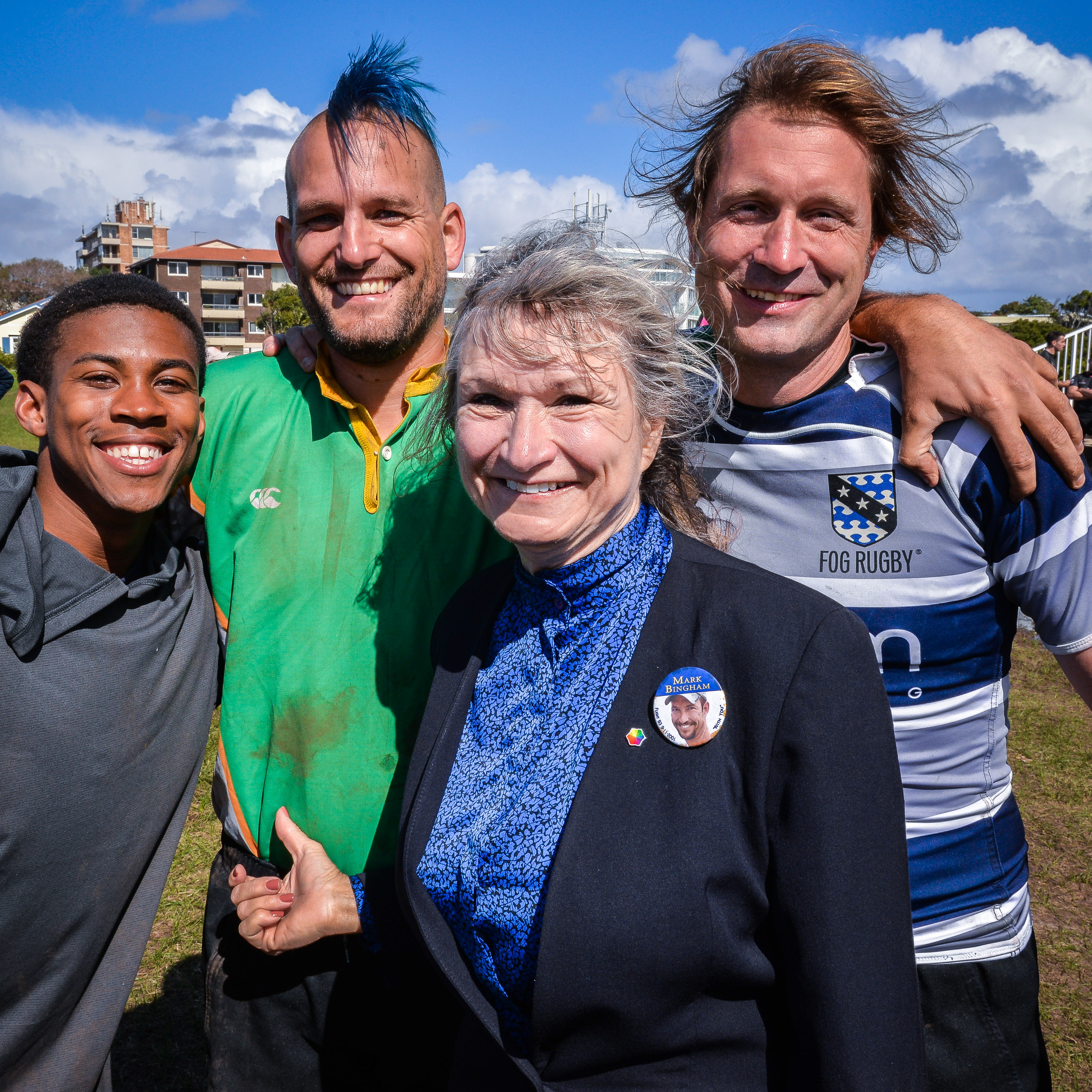
Mark Bingham's mother (Alice Hoagland) and his friend Jason Reimuller (R) at training for Bingham Cup 2014 in Sydney

== History ==
=== Founding ===
In October 2000, gay and bisexual rugby union teams worldwide founded the International Gay Rugby Association and Board (IGRAB) as a body to promote rugby union as an all-inclusive non-discriminatory sport which everyone can play, regardless of sexuality.

An informal invitational tournament, held in May 2001, was formally inaugurated by IGRAB as a new international rugby union competition — a gay rugby union world cup — which in a unanimous decision by all the members of IGRAB became known as the Bingham Cup.

The tournament was named after Mark Bingham, a former University of California, Berkeley rugby star who had played in the May 2001 tournament for San Francisco Fog RFC and cofounded the Gotham Knights RFC. Bingham died in the September 11, 2001 attacks on board United Airlines Flight 93. According to Jon Barrett of The Advocate, he is generally accepted to be one of a group of passengers who fought with the hijackers aboard the flight, which eventually led to the hijackers crashing the plane into a vacant field in Pennsylvania instead of targets in Washington, D.C. At the time of his death, there were around eight gay-inclusive rugby clubs worldwide, and he was helping to create others.

=== Washington invitational, 2001 ===
In May 2001, in a precursor to the tournament, the Washington Renegades hosted an IGRAB International Invitational for gay rugby union teams in Washington D.C., United States.

The event was officially a Rugby sevens tournament among the existing IGRAB teams at the time. In addition to the tournament, there was an exhibition rugby union or XVs matches. In the exhibition match between the San Francisco Fog RFC and the Renegades, the two played against each other for the first time in a XVs match. The Fog won 19-0.

=== San Francisco, 2002 ===
In October 2001, following the 2001 invitational, the San Francisco Fog successfully lobbied IGRAB for the right to put on a XVs rugby tournament in San Francisco in June 2002.

The tournament was fashioned in the style of the Rugby World Cup, both the tournament and the cup prize were named in honor of Mark Kendall Bingham, a club founder who died on United Airlines flight 93 during the September 11th terrorist attacks. Later the name Bingham Cup become the informal name.

Eight teams traveled to San Francisco during gay pride weekend of June 28–29, 2002 to compete over two days with the Fog coming out on top as the Cup’s first winners.

The event was sponsored by Nike and Guinness and was covered by press from around the world, including ESPN.

The Fog A side emerged undefeated, defeating the London Kings Cross Steelers 27-5 in the final. Alice Hoagland, Mark Bingham’s mom, presented the Fog with the trophy. The event was profiled in a two-page article in Rugby World magazine.

=== London, 2004 ===
In May 2004, the Bingham Cup competition was hosted by London, England, club Kings Cross Steelers. From eight teams just two years prior, twenty teams from four countries were fielded for the 2004 cup, which was won for the second time by the San Francisco Fog RFC. During the 2004 cup, the Bingham Bowl Division was introduced, a middle tier award won by the Philadelphia Gryphons. The inaugural bowl was literally a bowl from the kitchen of the Esher RFC in London.

=== New York, 2006 ===
Hosting of the third Bingham Cup was awarded to New York City's Gotham Knights RFC in October 2004 in a unanimous vote by the International Gay Rugby Association and Board and was held on Randall's Island in New York's East River on Memorial Day weekend, May 26–28, 2006. 29 teams from 22 clubs in 6 countries participated.

The tournament field was divided into 3 divisions, the Bingham Cup for the strongest teams, Bingham Bowl and Bingham Plate. 2006 also included the first ever Women's division, with 2 teams entering.

In March 2006, the Bingham Cup Organizing Committee announced that donations would be made to two charities: The Mark Kendall Bingham Leadership Fund, a scholarship established in Bingham's name at the University of California-Berkeley, his alma mater, and the Flight 93 Memorial Fund administered by the National Park Service to be constructed in Somerset County, Pennsylvania.

Over 800 registered participants from 29 teams in nine countries took part in the largest Bingham Cup tournament to date.

Australia

- Sydney Convicts (A & B)

Canada

- Muddy York (Toronto)

Ireland

- Emerald Warriors (Dublin)

Netherlands

- Amsterdam NOP

United Kingdom

- Cardiff Lions
- Kings Cross Steelers (London)
- Manchester Village Spartans RUFC

United States

- Austin Lonestars,
- Atlanta Bucks,
- Chicago Dragons,
- Dallas Diablos,
- Gotham Knights (New York A & B),
- Boston Ironsides,
- Los Angeles Rebellion,
- Minneapolis Mayhem,
- Phoenix Storm,
- Philadelphia Gryphons,
- Portland Avalanche,
- San Francisco Fog (A & B),
- Seattle Quake,
- Washington Renegades (A & B),
- Scottsdale Lady Blues,
- Bingham Motleys,
- IGR World Barbarians,

Teams participating for the first time included the Cardiff Lions, the Phoenix Storm, the Portland Avalanche, the Chicago Dragons, the Amsterdam NOP, and the Minneapolis Mayhem.

The cup final was between reigning champions San Francisco Fog A and the Sydney Convicts A, who won the game 16-10. Boston Ironsides defeated the Dallas Diablos to win the inaugural Bingham Bowl. Sydney Convicts B beat the IGR World Barbarians to win the Bingham Plate. The final standings for the tournament are as follows:

Bingham Cup Division

- Sydney Convicts A
- San Francisco Fog A
- Washington Renegades A
- Gotham Knights A
- Seattle Quake
- Kings Cross Steelers
- Los Angeles Rebellion
- Manchester Village Spartans

Bingham Bowl Division

- Boston Ironsides
- Dallas Diablos
- Philadelphia Gryphons
- Austin Lonestars
- Chicago Dragons
- Atlanta Bucks
- Portland Avalanche
- Emerald Warriors

Bingham Plate Division

- Sydney Convicts B
- IGR World Barbarians
- Washington Renegades B
- Gotham Knights B
- Minneapolis Mayhem
- Cardiff Lions
- Phoenix Storm
- San Francisco Fog B
- Toronto Muddy York
- Amsterdam NOP

The 2008 documentary film Walk Like a Man focuses on the Sydney Convicts and San Francisco Fog as they prepare and compete for this Bingham Cup.

=== Dublin, 2008 ===
On December 1, 2006, IGRAB announced the success of the bid of Emerald Warriors to host the 2008 competition in Dublin Ireland. Other bidding cities included Sydney, Australia, and Paris, France. In addition, Las Vegas, Nevada, Seattle, Washington, Cardiff, Wales, and Toronto, Ontario, Canada also considered bidding to host the 2008 tournament.

The fourth Bingham cup was held in Dublin on the weekend of the 13–16 June, at Dublin City University campus. 32 teams competed across four divisions (the Cup, the Plate, the Bowl and the Shield). The Sydney Convicts (A Team) took the cup back with them to Australia after winning the Cup competition for the second time in a row, this time defeating the Kings Cross Steelers (A Team) in the Cup final. The IGR World Barbarians team, made up largely of the Nashville Grizzlies, beat the Sydney Convicts (B Team) in the Plate final. Belfast team the Ulster Titans won the shield. The Atlanta Bucks defeated the Kings Cross Steelers (B Team) in the Bowl division, making them the only North American team to win a title in this year's tournament.

=== Minneapolis, 2010 ===
On January 21, 2009, IGRAB announced that the hosting rights for the 2010 Mark Kendall Bingham Memorial Tournament had been awarded to the Minneapolis Mayhem. The tournament was held at the National Sports Center in Blaine, Minnesota, June 17–20, 2010.

The Cup returned to US soil as the 2006 tourney hosts, the Gotham Knights pulled an upset win over the reigning champions, the Sydney Convicts. The 2010 tournament introduced the Crest and Spoon divisions. The Phoenix Storm won the Crest after defeating the Gotham Knights B-Side in the final. The Bingham Spoon was claimed for the first time by the Seattle Quake B when they defeated the Ottawa Wolves in the final.

=== Manchester, 2012 ===
It was announced on September 29, 2010, that the Manchester Village Spartans RUFC, England, would host the 2012 Bingham Cup, beating the Sydney Convicts' bid by 6 votes. Notably, Manchester's bid was actively supported by straight professional English rugby player Ben Cohen. The competition was held at Broughton Park RUFC, Manchester, June 1–3 and boasted the largest number of inclusive teams in the tournament's history.

=== Sydney, 2014 ===
In August 2014, the Sydney Convicts brought the Bingham Cup competition to the southern hemisphere. Twenty-four teams traveled to New South Wales, Australia for three rainy days of competition at the home of the Woollahra Colleagues RFC. The home-town Convicts ultimately won the Cup for the second consecutive tournament.

=== Nashville, 2016 ===
Hosting of the eighth Bingham Cup was awarded to Tennessee's Nashville Grizzlies, marking the first time the tournament would be held in the American South. The tournament was held on Memorial Day weekend at Nashville's Ted Rhodes Park with players housed at Vanderbilt University. Forty-five teams competed for tournament prizes in twelve divisions. The winners of the twelve divisions were as follows (in ascending order):

- Challenger Julep - Chicago Dragons B
- Challenger Cup - Dallas Lost Souls
- Hoagland Spoon - Ottawa Wolves
- Hoagland Vase - Kings Cross Steelers C
- Hoagland Shield - Nashville Grizzlies A
- Hoagland Bowl - Columbus Coyotes
- Hoagland Cup - Caledonian Thebans
- Hoagland Plate - San Diego Armada
- Bingham Shield - Washington Renegades B
- Bingham Bowl - IGR World Barbarians
- Bingham Plate - Gotham Knights A
- Bingham Cup - Melbourne Chargers A

In addition, the Nashville tournament hosted the inaugural Bingham Old Boys match & marked the first awarding of the Bingham Cane for the winning team.

=== Amsterdam, 2018 ===
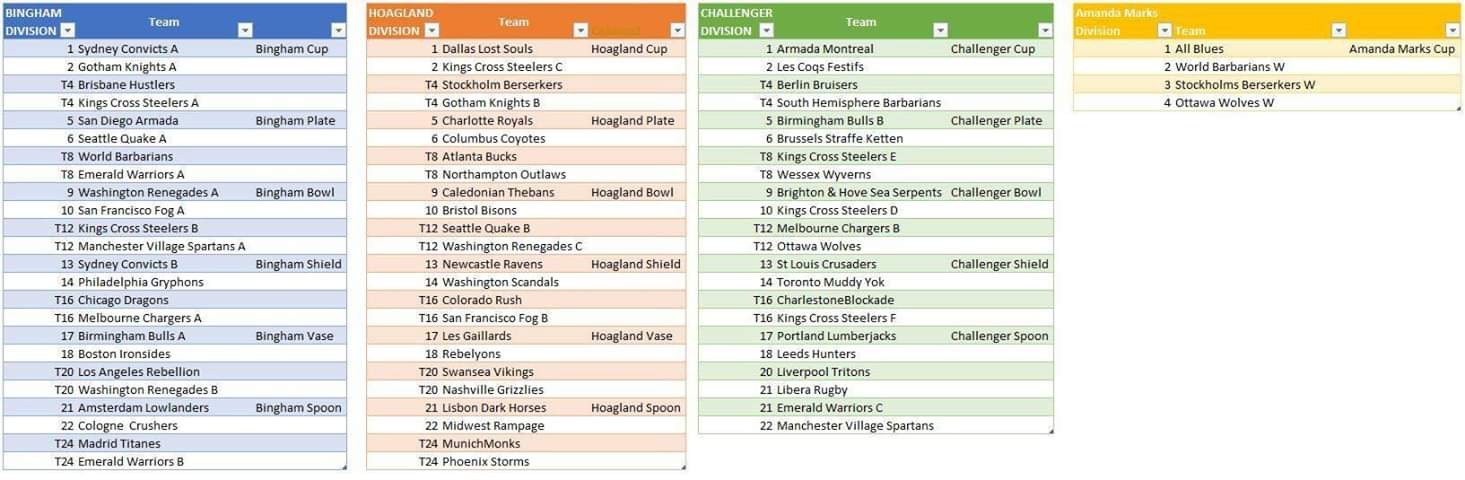
Bingham Cup 2018 Full Results Table

- Bingham Cup - Sydney Convicts A
- Bingham Plate - San Diego Armada
- Bingham Bowl - Washington Renegades A
- Bingham Shield - Sydney Convicts B
- Bingham Vase - Birmingham Bulls A
- Bingham Spoon - Amsterdam Lowlanders
- Hoagland Cup - Dallas Lost Souls
- Hoagland Plate - Charlotte Royals
- Hoagland Bowl - Caledonian Thebans
- Hoagland Shield - Newcastle Ravens
- Hoagland Vase - Les Gaillards Parisiens
- Hoagland Spoon - Lisbon Dark Horses
- Challenger Cup - Armada Montreal
- Challenger Plate - Birmingham Bulls B
- Challenger Bowl - Brighton & Hove Sea Serpents
- Challenger Shield - St Louis Crusaders
- Challenger Spoon - Portland Lumberjacks

=== Ottawa, 2020 ===
On October 4, 2018, IGR announced that the 2020 Bingham Cup was awarded to the Ottawa Wolves and that the tournament would be played in Ottawa, Ontario, Canada. Ottawa was to be the first city in Canada to host the tournament, which was originally scheduled to be played August 8–17, 2020.

On March 28, 2020, IGR announced that the 2020 Bingham Cup was postponed until August 2022 because of the Covid-19 outbreak.

=== Ottawa, 2022 ===
The 10th edition of Bingham began on August 18th, 2022, in Ottawa, Canada Host by club Ottawa Wolves

- Bingham Cup - London Kings Cross Steelers
- Bingham Plate - Dublin Emerald Warriors
- Bingham Bowl - Seattle Quake
- Bingham Shield - Washington Renegades
- Hoagland Cup - London Kings Cross Steelers
- Hoagland Plate - Montréal Armada
- Hoagland Bowl - Paris Gaillards
- Hoagland Shield - Washington Renegades
- Challenger Cup - Baltimore Flamingos
- Challenger Plate - Nashville Grizzlies
- Challenger Bowl - Toronto Muddy York
- Challenger Shield - Preston-Brighton-Toronto Snakes on a Plane
- Amanda Cup - Ottawa Wolves

=== Rome, 2024 ===
The 11th edition of Bingham was held in Rome by Host club Libera Rugby, from the 23rd to the 26th of May 2024.

- Bingham Cup - Paris Les Gaillards 1
- Bingham Bowl - London Kings Cross Steelers 1
- Bingham Plate - New York Gotham Knights 1
- Bingham Shield - Washington Renegades
- Hoagland Cup - London Kings Cross Steelers 2
- Hoagland Bowl - Montréal Armada 1
- Hoagland Plate - Melbourne Chargers
- Hoagland Shield - Baltimore Flamingos
- Hoagland Vase - Sydney Convicts
- Hoagland Tankard - Washington Renegades 3
- Challenger Cup - Cork Hellhounds
- Challenger Bowl - Yorkshire Roses
- Challenger Plate - Wessex Wyverns
- Challenger Shield - Flying Monks
- Challenger Vase - Colchester Kings
- Challenger Tankard - Wisconsin Beer Bulls
- Challenger Secpter - Brighton & Hove Sea Serpents
- Challenger Spoon - Montreal Berserker
- Gladiators Cup - Caledonian Thebans
- Gladiators Bowl - Touwin 2
- Gladiators Plate - Tel Aviv Ibex
- Gladiators Shield - Straffe Flamingos
- Amanda Cup - Amsterdam Lowlanders
- Amanda Bowl - Les Simone

=== Brisbane, 2026 ===
The 12th edition of Bingham was held in Brisbane in August 2026.

== Tournament Summary ==
List of Bingham Cup Winners and Runners Up
Year & Host City	Champions	Runners Up
2002 (United States) San Francisco	(United States) San Francisco Fog	(England) Kings Cross Steelers
2004 (England) London	(United States) San Francisco Fog	(England) Manchester Village Spartans
2006 (United States) New York City	(Australia) Sydney Convicts	(United States) San Francisco Fog
2008 (Republic of Ireland) Dublin	(Australia) Sydney Convicts	(England) Kings Cross Steelers
2010 (United States) Minneapolis	(United States) Gotham Knights	(Australia) Sydney Convicts
2012 (England) Manchester	(Australia) Sydney Convicts	(United States) San Francisco Fog
2014 (Australia) Sydney	(Australia) Sydney Convicts	(Australia) Brisbane Hustlers
2016 (United States) Nashville	(Australia) Melbourne Chargers	(Australia) Sydney Convicts
2018 (Netherlands) Amsterdam	(Australia) Sydney Convicts	(United States) Gotham Knights
2020 (Canada) Ottawa	Cancelled	Cancelled
2022 (Canada) Ottawa	(England) Kings Cross Steelers	(United States) Gotham Knights
2024 (Italy) Rome	(France) Les Gaillards Parisiens	(Australia) Sydney Convicts
2026 (Australia) Brisbane	(England) Kings Cross Steelers	(Australia) Sydney Convicts

== See also ==
- Union Cup
