= Mark Bingham =

Passenger on United Airlines Flight 93 (1970–2001)

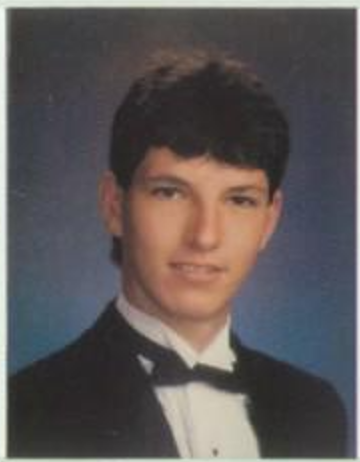
- Bingham's senior portrait c. 1987–1988
- Born: Mark Kendall Bingham; May 22, 1970; Phoenix, Arizona, U.S.
- Died: September 11, 2001 (aged 31); Stonycreek Township, Pennsylvania, U.S.
- Cause of death: Plane crash during the September 11 attacks
- Education: University of California, Berkeley (BS)
- Height: 6 ft 4 in (193 cm)
- Partner: Paul Holm
- Mother: Alice Hoagland

Rugby union career
Amateur team(s)
Years	Team	Apps	(Points)
- Los Gatos High School
–	California Golden Bears		
–	San Francisco Fog RFC		

Mark Kendall Bingham (May 22, 1970 – September 11, 2001) was an American public relations executive who founded his own company, the Bingham Group. During the September 11 attacks in 2001, he was a passenger on United Airlines Flight 93. Bingham was among the passengers who, along with Todd Beamer, Tom Burnett and Jeremy Glick, formed a plan to retake the plane from the hijackers. During the struggle, the aircraft crashed into a field near Shanksville, Pennsylvania, preventing the hijackers from reaching their intended target in Washington, D.C., believed to be either the U.S. Capitol Building or the White House.

Bingham's efforts on United Flight 93, as well as his athletic physique, were noted for prompting a reassessment of gay stereotypes.

== Early life ==
Mark Kendall Bingham was born on May 22, 1970, the only child of Alice Hoagland and Gerald Bingham. When he was two years old, his parents divorced. Raised by his mother and her family, he grew up in Miami, Florida, and Southern California before moving to the San Jose area in 1983. Bingham was an aspiring filmmaker, and as a teenager he began using a video camera as a personal diary to document his life and those of his family and friends. He graduated from Los Gatos High School in 1988, serving as a two‑year captain of the rugby team. As an undergraduate at the University of California, Berkeley, Bingham played on two of Coach Jack Clark's national-championship-winning rugby teams in the early 1990s. He also joined the Chi Psi fraternity, eventually becoming its president. Upon graduation at the age of 21, Bingham came out as gay to his family and friends.

== Rugby and business career ==
A large athlete at 6 ft 4 in (193 cm) and 225 pounds (102 kg), Bingham also played for the gay-inclusive rugby union team San Francisco Fog RFC. He played No. 8 in their first two friendly matches. He played in their first tournament, and taught his teammates his favorite rugby songs.

At the time of his death, Bingham had recently opened a satellite office of his public relations firm in New York City and was spending more time on the East Coast. He discussed plans with his friend Scott Glaessgen to form a New York City rugby team, the Gotham Knights.

== September 11, 2001 ==
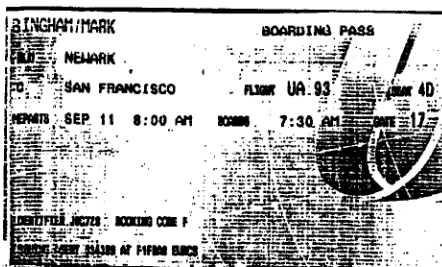
Mark Bingham's boarding pass for Flight 93

On the morning of September 11, Bingham overslept and nearly missed his flight, on his way to San Francisco to be an usher in his fraternity brother's wedding. He arrived at Terminal A at Newark International Airport at 7:40 am, ran to Gate 17, and was the last passenger to board United Airlines Flight 93, taking seat 4D next to passenger Tom Burnett.

Flight 93 was scheduled to depart at 8:00 am, but the plane did not leave until 42 minutes later because of runway traffic delays. Four minutes later, American Airlines Flight 11 crashed into the World Trade Center's North Tower. At 9:03 am, as United Airlines Flight 175 crashed into the South Tower, Flight 93 climbed to cruising altitude, heading west over New Jersey and into Pennsylvania. At 9:25 am, while above eastern Ohio, pilots Jason Dahl and LeRoy Homer received an alert, "Beware of cockpit intrusion," on the cockpit computer device ACARS (Aircraft Communications and Reporting System). Three minutes later, Cleveland controllers heard screams over the cockpit's open microphone. Moments after that, the hijackers, led by Lebanese national Ziad Jarrah, took control of the plane and told passengers, "Keep remaining sitting. We have a bomb on board". Bingham and the other passengers were moved to the back of the plane. Within six minutes, the aircraft changed course and headed for Washington, D.C. Several passengers made phone calls to loved ones, who told them about the two planes that had crashed into the World Trade Center.

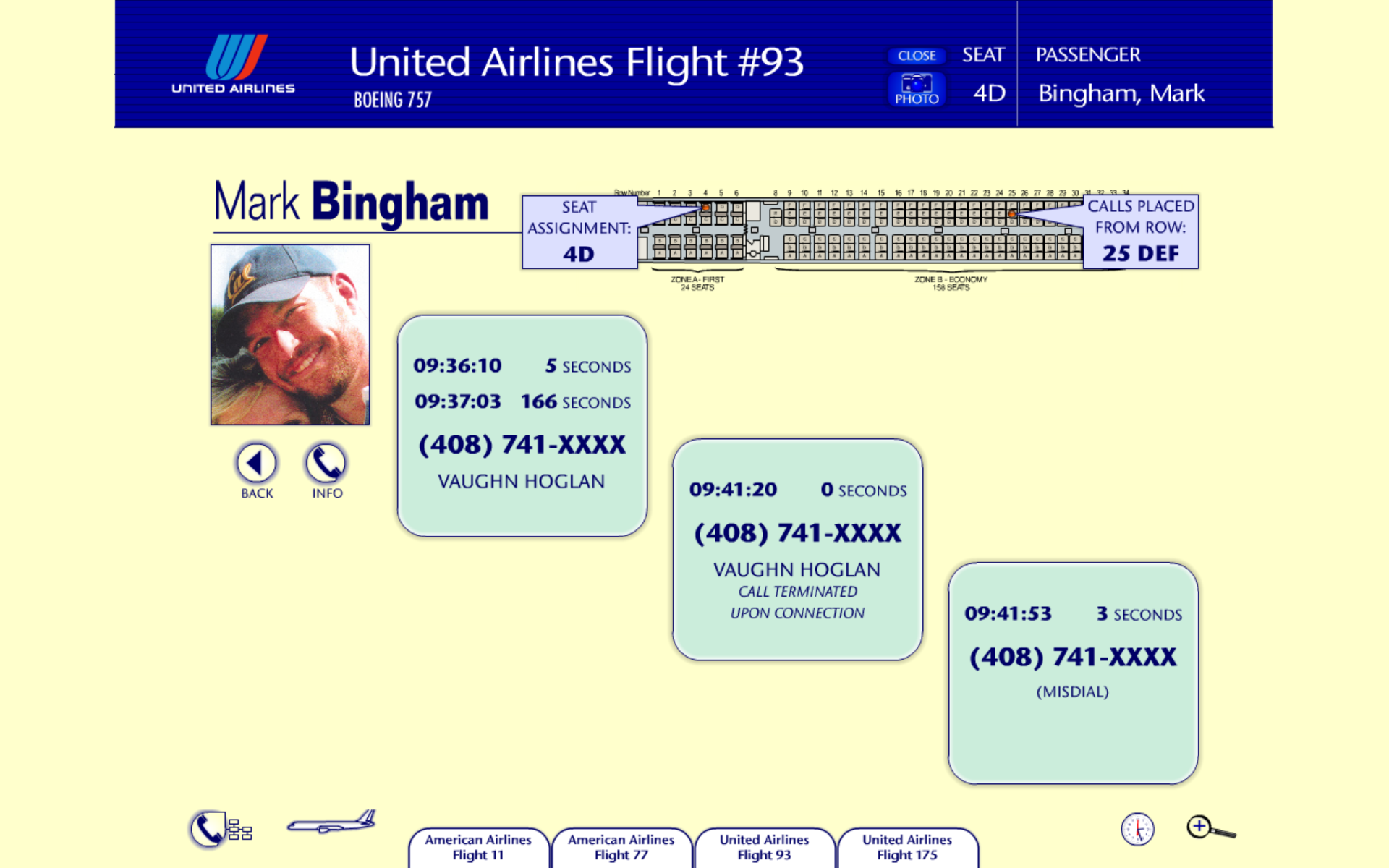
Phone call details

After the hijackers veered the plane sharply south, the passengers decided to act. Bingham, along with Todd Beamer, Tom Burnett, and Jeremy Glick, formed a plan to retake the plane. They relayed this plan to their loved ones and the authorities via telephone. Bingham reached his aunt's home in California. He said, "This is Mark Bingham. I want to let you guys know that I love you, in case I don't see you again...I'm on United Airlines, Flight 93. It's being hijacked." According to The Week, Hoagland formed the impression that her son spoke "confidentially" with a fellow passenger to form a plan to retake the plane. According to ABC News, the call cut off after about three minutes. Hoagland, after seeing news reports of the hijacking, called him back and left two messages, saying, "Mark, this is your mom. The news is that it's been hijacked by terrorists. They are planning to probably use the plane as a target to hit some site on the ground. I would say go ahead and do everything you can to overpower them, because they are hellbent. Try to call me back if you can." Bingham, Burnett, and Glick were each more than 6 feet (1.83 m) tall, well-built, and fit. As they made their decision to retake the plane, Glick relayed this over the phone to his wife, Lyz. Beamer, speaking to GTE-Verizon supervisor Lisa Jefferson and the FBI, said that he too was part of this group. They were joined by other passengers, including Lou Nacke, Rich Guadagno, Alan Beaven, Honor Elizabeth Wainio, Linda Gronlund, and William Cashman, along with flight attendants Sandra Bradshaw and CeeCee Lyles, in discussing their options and voting on a course of action, ultimately deciding to storm the cockpit.

According to the 9/11 Commission Report, the cockpit voice recorder revealed pounding and crashing against the cockpit door and shouts and screams in English. "Let's get them!" a passenger cried. A hijacker shouted, "Allāhu ʾakbar!" ("God is great"). Jarrah repeatedly pitched the plane to throw passengers off their feet, but they continued their assault. One passenger was heard shouting, "In the cockpit. If we don't, we'll die." At 10:02 am, a hijacker ordered, "Pull it down! Pull it down!" The Commission later reported that the plane's control wheel was turned hard to the right, causing it to roll on its back and crash into an empty field in Shanksville, Pennsylvania, at 580 miles per hour (930 km/h), killing everyone on board. The plane was 20 minutes of flying time from its suspected target, the White House or the U.S. Capitol Building in Washington, D.C. According to Vice President Dick Cheney, President George W. Bush gave the order to shoot the plane down.

Bingham is buried at Madronia Cemetery in Saratoga, California.

== Legacy ==
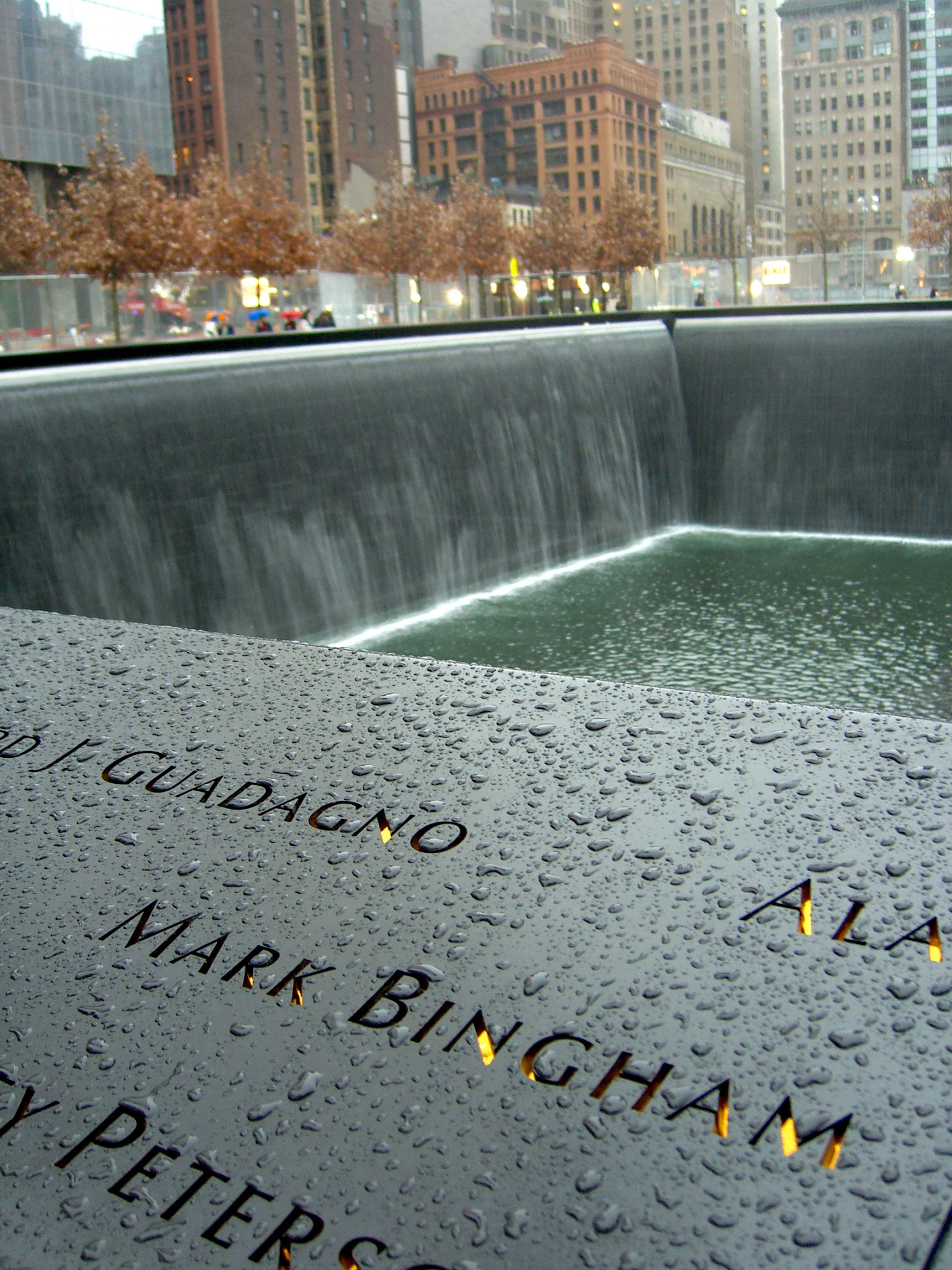
Bingham's name is located on Panel S-67 of the National September 11 Memorial's South Pool, along with those of other passengers of Flight 93.

Bingham's former partner of six years, Paul Holm, said, "If he knew that lives were at stake, I'm convinced with every bone in my body that he would have jumped into action, he was physically fit and strong, and guns and weapons didn't bother him."

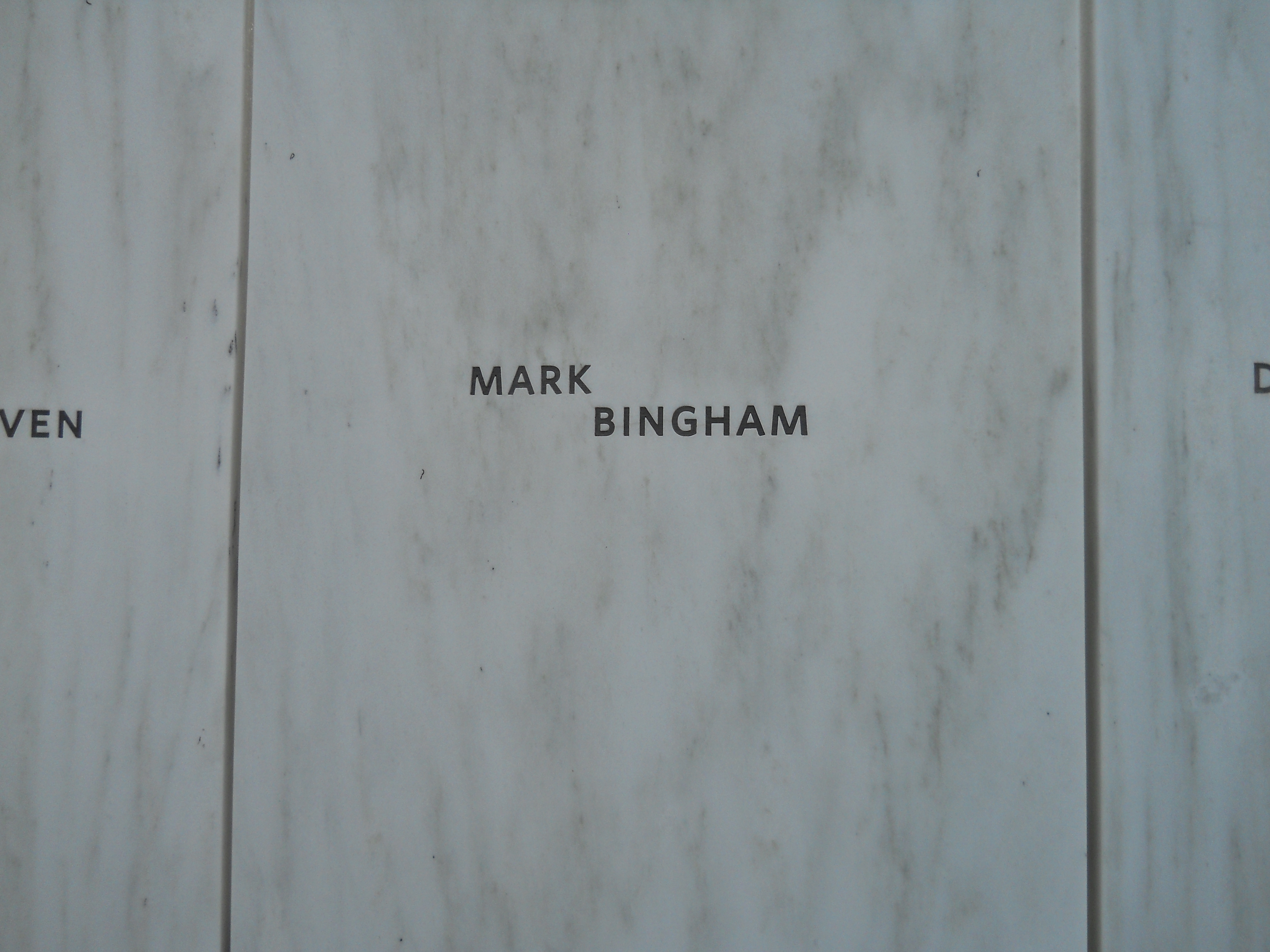
Bingham's name on the Flight 93 National Memorial

U.S. Senators John McCain and Barbara Boxer honored Bingham at a ceremony for San Francisco Bay Area victims of the attacks, presenting a folded American flag to Holm.

The Mark Kendall Bingham Memorial Tournament (the Bingham Cup), a biennial international rugby union competition predominantly for gay and bisexual men, was established in 2002 in his memory.

Bingham, along with the other passengers on Flight 93, was posthumously awarded the Arthur Ashe Courage Award in 2002.

The Eureka Valley Recreation Center's Gymnasium in San Francisco was renamed the Mark Bingham Gymnasium in August 2002.

Singer Melissa Etheridge dedicated the song "Tuesday Morning" in 2004 to his memory.

Beginning in 2005, the UC Berkeley Foundation and the California Alumni Association named the Mark Bingham Award for Excellence in Achievement by Young Alumni in his honor. According to the university, the award recognizes "a young alumnus/a who graduated within the last 10 years who has made a significant contribution to his/her community, country, or the world at large." The award is presented at the school's annual Berkeley Charter Gala.

At the National 9/11 Memorial, Bingham and other passengers from Flight 93 are memorialized at the South Pool, on Panel S-67.

At the Flight 93 National Memorial in Pennsylvania, Bingham's name appears on the 40 8-foot-tall (2.4-meter) panels of polished granite that form the memorial's Wall of Names.

The 2013 feature-length documentary The Rugby Player focuses on Bingham and the bond he had with his mother, Alice Hoagland, a former United Airlines flight attendant who, after his death, became an authority on airline safety and a champion of LGBT rights. Described by ESPN as "an insightful and stereotype-shattering exploration" of Bingham's life, the film, directed by Scott Gracheff, uses extensive video footage Bingham recorded from his teens until weeks before his death. The film's alternate title, With You, is a popular rugby term and one of Bingham's favorite expressions. The film premiered on Australia's ABC2 on August 20, 2014.

== In popular culture ==
- He has been portrayed by Jason LeGrande in the 2005 television film The Flight That Fought Back, American actor Cheyenne Jackson in United 93, and Canadian actor Ty Olsson in Flight 93.
- Bingham was also referenced, although not by name, in the song Tuesday Morning by Melissa Etheridge on her Breakdown album.
