= Washington Renegades RFC =

Washington Renegades
- Founded: 1998
- Location: Washington, D.C.

Official website
- www.dcrugby.com

The Washington Renegades are a Division III and Division IV rugby union club based in Washington D.C. Established on October 24, 1998, by Mark Hertzog.

In October 1999, the club played its first 15s match against the Roanoke Rugby Football Club. In July 2000, the team competed in a sevens tournament held in London, England, against teams from London and Manchester. In May 2001, the club held its inaugural International Rugby Invitational, which included teams from San Francisco, Manchester, England and Buenos Aires. Also attending were individual players from Chicago, London and Melbourne. In 2002 and 2004, the club participated in the IGRAB Rugby Festival and Mark Bingham Cup, named for former UC Berkeley and San Francisco Fog RFC rugby player Mark Bingham, who died on September 11, 2001.
