= Ottawa Trans Library =

Community center in Ottawa, Canada

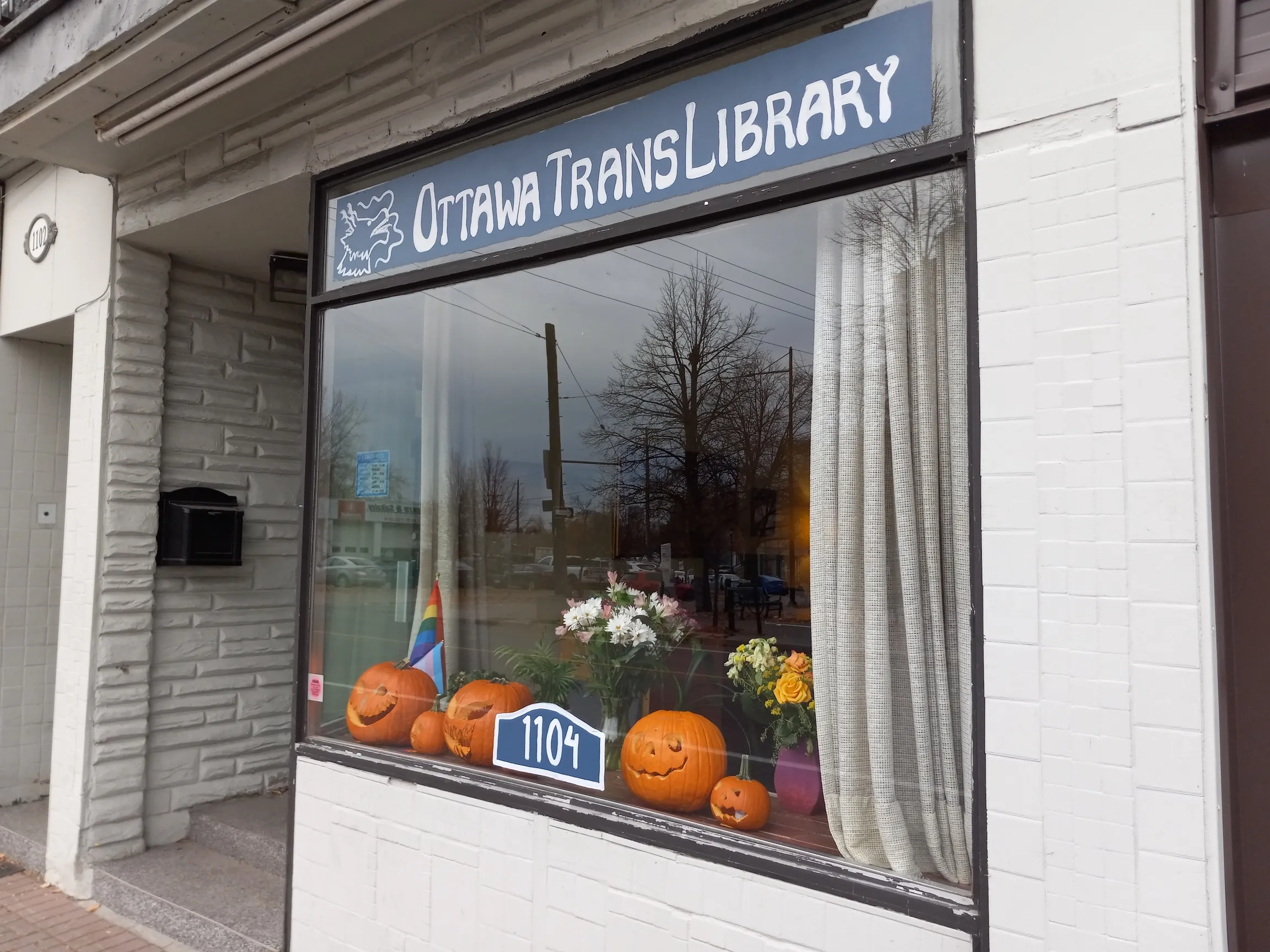
- Exterior view of the Ottawa Trans Library.
- Founded: May 29, 2022; 4 years ago
- Founder: Tara Sypniewski
- Type: Not-for-Profit Corporation November 1, 2022
- Location: Ottawa ON, Canada
- Products: Books by trans authors, historical works on trans issues and people, non-trans titles, and future plans include a music library.
- Services: Lending library Resource center Community space Community events Book donations
- Website: Ottawa Trans Library

The Ottawa Trans Library is a library focusing on transgender books, founded by Tara Sypniewski in the Hintonburg neighbourhood and opened on May 29, 2022. The library functions as a non-profit lending library and community center.

== Background ==
In the late 1970s, Tara Sypniewski sought to research transgender experiences using limited resources like Deborah Heller Feinbloom's Transvestites & Transexuals: Mixed Views from the Ottawa Public Library. Since the 1980s, Sypniewski had participated in Ottawa's transgender community and its organizations, and she established the Ottawa Trans Library in 2022 as a library and community space.

== Services ==
The library is structured into a lending section dedicated to trans-themed books and a free library housing non-trans titles. The library receives donations, and its catalog includes graphic novels, local zines, and even transphobic titles.

Since its inception, the Ottawa Trans Library has experienced significant growth, expanding its collection from 190 titles to approximately 700 by February 2024. It has plans to establish a music library, supported by a donation of 500 albums from trans musicians.

== See also ==
- Transgender culture
- Ottawa Public Library
- Ottawa Capital Pride
- LGBTQ rights in Canada
- Transgender rights in Canada
- Timeline of LGBTQ history in Canada
