= Ādisōke =

- Interactive map of the Ādisōke area
- Former names: OPL and LAC Joint Facility

General information
- Type: Library and civic centre
- Location: 555 Albert Street, Ottawa, Canada
- Coordinates: 45°24′55″N 75°42′35″W
- Construction started: 2020
- Construction stopped: estimated late 2024/early 2025
- Cost: ~ CAD $334 million
- Client: City of Ottawa

Design and construction
- Architecture firm: Joint venture: Diamond Schmitt and KWC Architects

Ādisōke is the name of an upcoming joint facility between the Ottawa Public Library (OPL) and Library and Archives Canada (LAC). The OPL and LAC Joint Facility project's goal is to bring together the extensive collections of both institutions into one centre. It includes a series of community and creative spaces that aim to appeal to all residents and visitors of Ottawa. The official name and branding for the facility was released in October 2023.

== A brief history of LeBreton Flats ==
The LeBreton Flats area is steeped in historical importance, all of which add to the significance of the efforts being made to revitalise its name and historic association. Prior to the naming of LeBreton Flats, the key feature of the site was the Chaudière Falls, which hold a deep significance to the First Nations communities. This was the site for gatherings and sacred ceremonies, namely by the Algonquin, Huron, Odawa, Ojibwa and Iroquois communities. In 1809, the first owner of the land Robert Randall bought what was then known as lot 40 for the purpose of milling lumber, but would soon run into financial problems, leaving the lot vacant for another decade. Concurrently, a proposed canal that would connect the lower part of the St Lawrence River and the Ottawa River via the sacred Chaudière Falls was underway. This connection increased the ease of travel though the existing trade routes and made the land more appealing. Therein began the battle for lot 40, in which Lieutenant LeBreton would underhandedly acquire the land and a life-long enemy in Lord Dalhousie. The land would later be divided and sold for profit.

By the end of the 19th century the LeBreton Flats area housed a thriving lumber industry around which many of its workers resided. Unfortunately, the area was devastated by the great fire of 1900 which destroyed the community and a large portion of Ottawa. This historic event shifted the population towards other neighbourhoods and lead to the creation of a new type of industrial town. This new community was indicative of a bustling society, but only lasted till the 1962 bulldozing of LeBreton Flats to make way for new headquarters and freeway additions. Although these plans were never fully realised, 2800 residents of the area were displaced, leaving a bitter historic mark on the site of LeBreton Flats.

== Site selection and environmental sensitivity ==
The centre's building is to be located on 555 Albert street with views onto the neighbouring Chaudière Falls while “bridging the boundary of town and crown” and has been described as “a natural extension of Ottawa’s traditional downtown”.

The facility's location at the junction of LeBreton Flats and Chinatown positions it as the primary library branch for the district, further establishing the area as a central cultural and community hub.

The site was chosen though a laborious evaluation of factors:

1. Configuration
2. Access
3. Unobstructed sight lines
4. Cost
5. Proximity to other cultural institutions.

Due to the historic richness of the site and the extensive evaluation conducted, the sensitivity directed towards the land holds much importance. In the beginning of the project's life there already existed a mandate that demanded at minimum a LEED Gold rating but through an iterative design process the standard has been elevated to a goal of Net-Zero. This upgrade was feasible through the funding offered by the federal government and includes the refinement of the building's envelope and insulation, triple glazing of windows, an indoor green wall, a green roofing system, a solar rooftop and embedded wall panels. This act of environmental sensitivity will result in a reduction of 30 percent of greenhouse emissions and aims to emphasise the direction in which Ottawa is moving to building a sustainable and healthy future for its present and future residents.

The mass timber curvilinear roof required specific dispensation from the city, as it is an alternative solution to non-combustible construction. The timber will act as a source for carbon sequestration, helping to capture and store atmospheric carbon. The amount of concrete used throughout the building will be decreased by the introduction of fly-ash and blast-slag as substitutes, where applicable. To achieve these levels of energy efficiency, energy modeling was utilised. This dedication to moving towards a more sustainable city can be seen additionally, by the federal government's renewing of the Cliff Plant facility that is aiming to provide carbon-free energy for the surrounding area. By being supplied hot and cold water from this plant, which in turn is to power the air-conditioning and heating systems, this building may become a benchmark of what civic centres are to strive toward from an environmental standpoint.

== Interior plan and spatial configuration ==
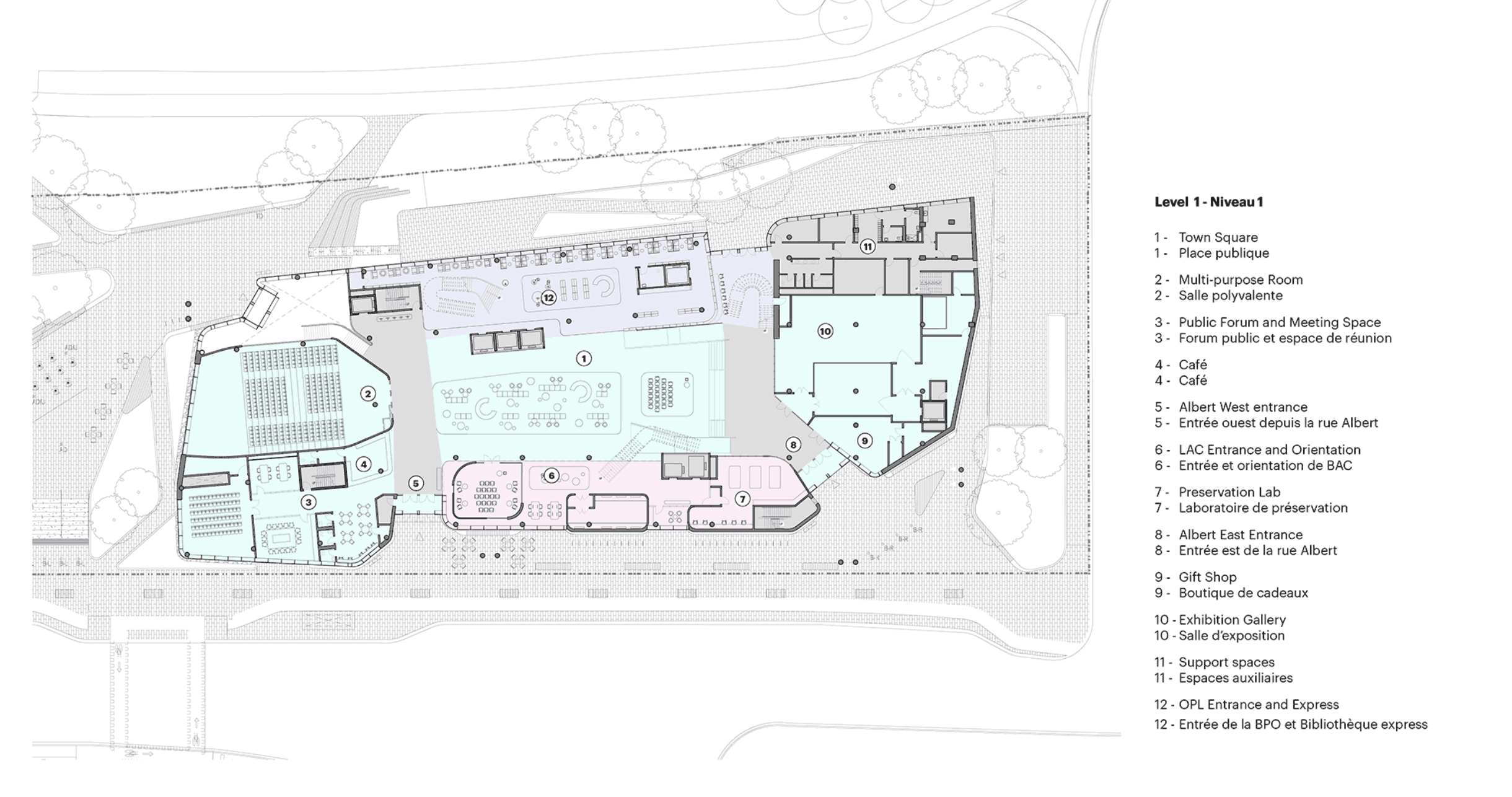
Latest orthographic drawings of level 1.

The form of the OPL and LAC Joint Facility is such that it follows the adjacent landscape's undulations evidently seen in the roof's shape which mimics the flow of the Ottawa River. The community influence is the founding reason for the form of the building, as there was a deterrence from the initial traditional rectilinear shape proposed. Instead, the public preferred sinuous and strongly connected spaces that do not allow for the strict demarcation offered by harsh edges. This involvement of the community is a key element that gives ownership of the building to the people and was further witnessed through the relentless commitment to online consultation, even during the COVID-19 pandemic. This joint consultation process is still continuing between all parties involved.

The building program is set around one of the main features named "the town hall”, which is visible from all 5 levels above ground. This space offers a flexible multi-functioning program that ranges from being a community visiting centre to holding large events. The size and availability of natural light throughout the hall create a central point around which the other spaces are visibly wrapped. It is this absence of sharp edges which allow for smooth circulating spaces and an equal experience for all visitors, of varying accessibility needs. This concept is further witnessed through the choice of glass as the elevator material, opening up the view from different levels for everyone to enjoy.

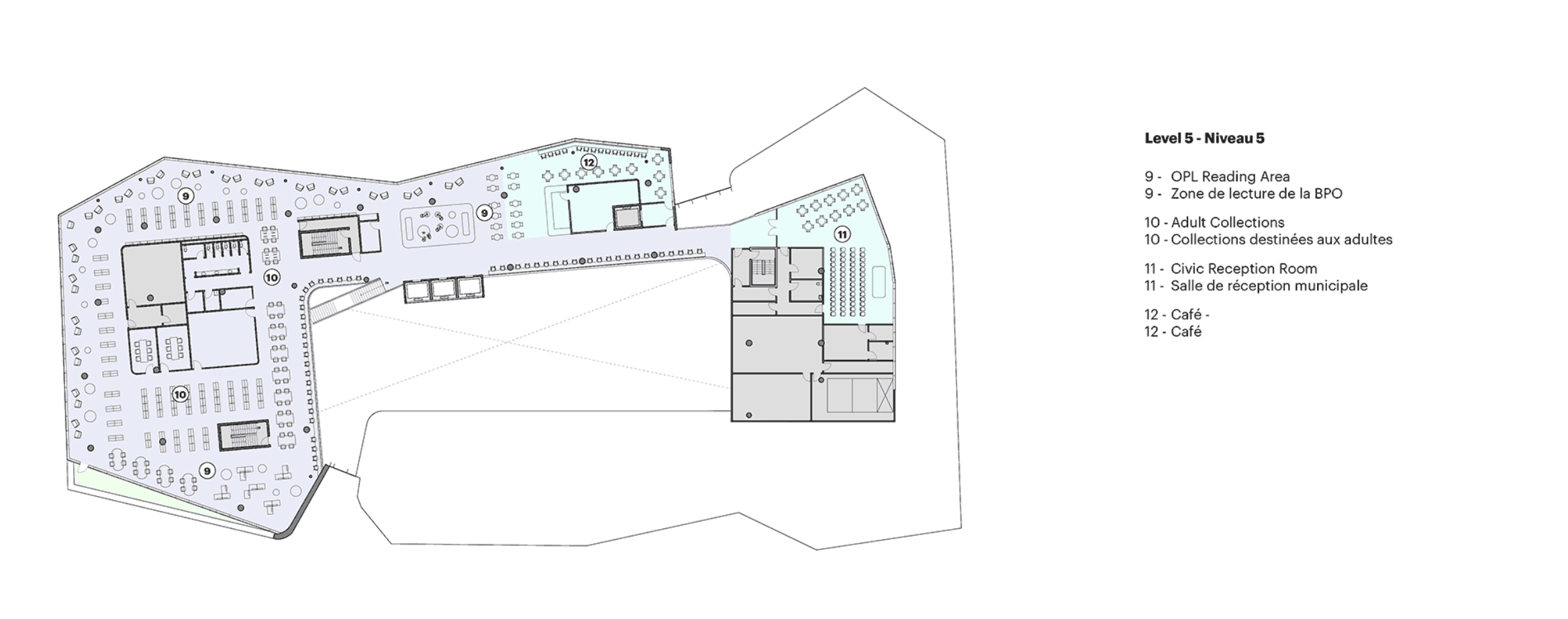
Latest orthographic drawings of level 5.

On the first level, most of the spaces are shared spaces: namely the Exhibition gallery, which aims to showcase artwork and artefacts from the Ottawa Public Library, The Ottawa Community and The Ottawa City Archives in a manner that expresses the concepts of heritage and culture in Canada; to the west is a multipurpose room that can house around 320 people. There are three means of entry: from the east right into the core of the building, along Albert street to the west and access from Pimisi station. Through the west entry there is a café to the left, an OPL designated space straight ahead and the LAC Orientation and Preservation Lab to the right. The centre is a merger of the two institutions, but is split sixty/ forty, giving the Ottawa Public Library a slightly larger claim of space. Below ground houses a large portion of the services and handling spaces for both partners, effectively freeing up space above ground for more communal and educational activity.

An all-inclusive space is one of the main goals of this centre, and therefore has programmed spaces that are meant to appeal to all visitors. The second-level houses a children's discovery and outdoor space that intends to stimulate imagination and engage all the domains of early childhood development by balancing educative and free play inside and outside the building. The floors above the first are shaped in two halves connected by bridge-like connectors. On the second floor these connectors bring together the discovery space and the well-anticipated joint genealogy research room, which combines a vast collection from the two partners. Connected vertically to the children spaces is a teen centre that is in close proximity to a design studio and CNC digital production centre, which further expresses the diversity of spaces present.

The fourth and fifth levels offer an array of adult fiction and non-fiction spaces of which the top level connects to a rooftop café. The roof top café has been noted as a key feature, based on its Northern view of the Ottawa River, Chaudière Falls and Parliament Hill. The clear view of these Ottawan staples act as a method of wayfinding and works further to ground the building in the landscape. The north and northeast sides of the room are fully glazed allowing for natural light to permeate the atmosphere. Both levels containing the adult collections are in close proximity to the well-awaited reading rooms. The fourth floor houses the largest portion of the LAC's programming, most importantly the LAC reference room which will inform the visitors on military history, sports archives and indigenous history. The fifth floor is the smallest and does not have LAC spaces, but rather shared and strictly OPL programs. The size of which is due to the undulating roof.

== First Nations engagement and materiality ==
The beginning stages of the design process included visits to local First Nation communities as the first method of outreach, namely Kitigan Zibi and Pikwakanagan. From this point there has been a continual dialogue. It was in these preliminary stages that a crucial design element was expressed by the community, ensuring that the interior atrium space was not “white and sterile” but rather “warm and inviting”. From these words of warning, a material palette was formed, one that begins at the wooden-cladded entrance and continues throughout the entire building. The remaining façade consists of limestone, creating a connection to the adjacent escarpment, and glass curtain walls mainly on the upper floors to allow for daylighting.

The encouraged public participation was integral and was placed before the acquirement of an architectural firm. As the history of Lebreton Flats began with the First Nations communities, creating a building that connected to their current needs and created a welcoming environment for all was of paramount importance. The goal of these meetings was to “foster friendship, build trust and ensure mutual benefits, while respecting cultural practices and traditional Indigenous knowledge”. There has been an acknowledgement of the effects of this building on First Nations communities on a local, neighbouring and global scale, which requires the ongoing and open conversation which has been promised. On the second floor, there is a round community gathering room, where all are welcome to learn about the rich history of the local First Nations community. Through the eastern entrance on Albert street is a plaque that features a wayfinding wheel and animals of significance to the Algonquin community, for which local indigenous artist Simon Brascopé has been commissioned. Additionally, all visitors will be welcomed in Algonquin dialects from an audio recording, as a sign of honour.

== Transport ==
Ottawa's increasing availability for cyclist and pedestrian circulation was taken into consideration through the design process of the centre. By including 200 bicycle storage spaces and the impending road alterations, this ensures a more seamless experience for all visitors. These road modifications are underway on Albert and Slater (2019-2021). Additionally, the LRT (light rail transit) has recently added Pimisi Station located 300 metres away, creating a quick connection to the new centre. This network of diverse transport systems is in line with the city's movement towards a greener way of living for all residents of Ottawa and also connects to the NCC's (National Capital Commission’s) plans to develop other parts of the LeBreton Flats area.

== Impacts of Covid-19 and future effects ==
In recent months, the COVID-19 virus has affected the lives of all around the world, and thus has brought to light the importance of adjustable architecture. The centre's large footprint and open spatial configuration allows for social distancing to occur, if still necessary in the upcoming years. This highlights the importance of architecture outside of places of residence that can be used safely and comfortably to house activity but still adapt to the ever-changing battlefield that the COVID-19 pandemic has created. In reaction to the pandemic, steps are being taken to ensure safety of the public, although the exact methods are still partially unknown and will be unveiled as the building process continues. There has been mention of increasing sanitation stations, increasing airflow rates and placing importance of air scrubbers and air purifiers throughout the building.

The creation of rich environments has become increasingly essential as people spend more time indoors. When the doors to the OPL and LAC Joint Facility open, there will be an array of indigenous and non-indigenous works of art which aim to breathe more life into the facility and add to the already-intriguing atmosphere.
