= Capital Pride (Ottawa) =

Annual LGBT pride week festival in Ottawa, Ontario

Ottawa Capital Pride Fierté dans la capitale

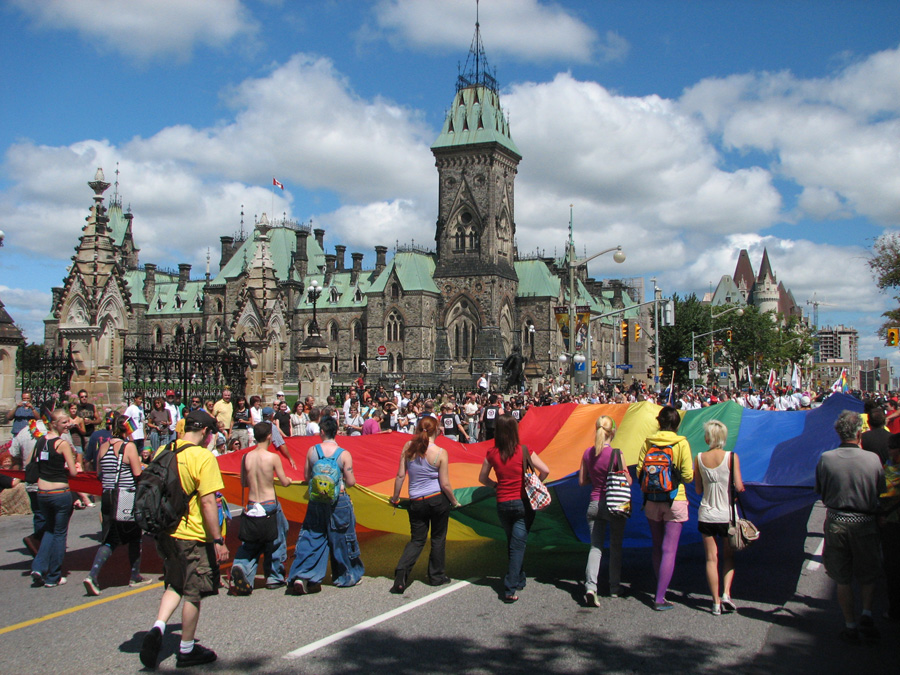
- Parade marchers passing the Parliament Buildings during the Ottawa Pride parade on August 26, 2007
- Status: Active
- Genre: Pride festival and parade
- Begins: August 22, 2026
- Ends: August 30, 2026
- Frequency: Annually, mid to late August
- Locations: National Capital Region; Ottawa, Ontario; Gatineau, Quebec
- Coordinates: 45.424721°N 75.695000°W
- Country: Canada
- Years active: 40
- Inaugurated: June 28, 1986
- Founder: Gays of Ottawa (GO)
- Previous event: August 16-24, 2025
- Next event: August 2027
- Organiser: Pride Week Committee (since May 9, 1997)
- Filing status: Not-for-Profit Corporation
- Website: Ottawa Capital Pride

Ottawa Capital Pride is an annual LGBTQ pride event, festival, and parade held in Ottawa, Ontario, Canada, and Gatineau, Quebec, from mid to late August. Established in 1986, it has evolved into a 7- to 9-day celebration of the 2SLGBTQIA+ community, advocating for equality, diversity, and inclusion in the National Capital Region. The festival offers bilingual events in English and French, known as 'Capital Pride / Fierté dans la capitale', blending local pride with national importance.

The Ottawa Pride Parade, initiated in 1989 and now held on the fourth Sunday of August, has expanded in size and impact. Serving as a platform for LGBTQ+ rights and visibility, it has achieved milestones in legal victories and inclusivity initiatives. Despite facing challenges, including financial hardships and occasional controversies, Ottawa Pride remains a prominent symbol of LGBTQ+ pride and unity in the Ottawa community. It also welcomes 2SLGBTQIA+ diversity from around the world, bridging local and national pride.

== Mission ==
Capital Pride's mission is to create opportunities to celebrate, advocate, educate and connect people, respecting the full diversity of the 2SLGBTQ+ community.

== History ==
=== Emergence and advocacy (1970s) ===
August 28, 1971: About 100 people from Ottawa, Montreal, Toronto, and surrounding areas gathered on Parliament Hill amidst pouring rain for the historic 'We Demand Rally,' the first-ever protest in Canada advocating for LGBT rights. Ten demands for equal rights within the burgeoning queer community were presented.

September 14, 1971: A small group of gay men gathered for the first time, inspired by the We Demand protest. This meeting led to a crucial development on October 13, 1971, when the Gays of Ottawa (GO) / Gai(e)s de l’Outaouais (GO) organization was formally established. GO emerged as Ottawa's inaugural queer rights organization, advocating for LGBT rights, community education, and empowerment.

In 1972, GO began publishing a newspaper, GO Info, which it published until 1995.

May 19 to 20, 1973: Gays of Ottawa (GO) hosted the inaugural national interprovincial conference of Gay Liberation groups in Canada. Activists from Quebec City, Halifax, Toronto, Vancouver, Saskatoon, and Montreal gathered in Ottawa.

October 15, 1974: Gays of Ottawa picketed the Immigration Department to protest screening policies discriminating against gays and lesbians seeking entry to Canada. Based in Ottawa they were frequently called on to wage the national battle for gay rights. On October 23, the federal government changed its policy after the immigration minister met with GO officials.

July 1, 1975: The National Gay Rights Coalition (NGRC) was founded at a national conference in Ottawa, with active involvement from Gays of Ottawa. The NGRC emerged as a civil rights organization, aiming for the "removal of all federal legislation which permits, condones, or encourages discrimination against homosexuals" and the "implementation of legislatively guaranteed civil rights for gay people."

May 22, 1976: The Ottawa Police conducted the city's first bathhouse raid at Club Baths, resulting in the arrest of 27 men on charges such as 'found-ins' and 'gross indecency.' Financial papers and a membership list with over 3,000 names were seized. Similar raids occurred in Toronto and Montreal as part of a broader 'clean-up' campaign before the 1976 summer Olympics.

May 24, 1976: In response to the raid, Gays of Ottawa organized a press conference, followed by a protest at the Ottawa Police Headquarters at 60 Waller Street on May 28, with approximately 50 participants. Drawing lessons from the 1975 'Vice Ring' case, which resulted in the death of Warren Zufflet, the Ottawa Citizen chose not to publish the names of the arrested individuals.

Feb 16, 1979: A fire completely destroyed the Gays of Ottawa GO Centre, consuming the building along with the majority of paperwork, erasing much of the records from the first decade.

From June 27 to July 2, 1979, the seventh annual Canadian Lesbian and Gay Rights Coalition (CLGRC) conference, titled "Celebration '79: Celebrating Ten Years of Lesbian/Gay Liberation", took place in Ottawa with support from the Gays of Ottawa (GO). Over 200 delegates attended, and Mayor Marion Dewar designated June 27 as "Human Rights Day". The conference aimed to commemorate a decade of gay liberation in Canada, coinciding with the tenth anniversary of the Omnibus Bill.

However, the event received mixed reviews, marked by tensions between advocates of local grassroots action and those favouring a national strategy. Heated debates emerged on the issue of lesbian participation, mirroring broader discussions within the gay liberation movement and reflecting the evolving landscape of the Canadian LGBTQ+ rights movement during that period.

=== Evolution and challenges (1980s) ===
During the 1980s, Ottawa's lesbian and gay community experienced a unification. The Gays of Ottawa (GO) saw greater female participation and membership. This transformed GO into a co-sexual organization, empowering women in prominent roles. The AIDS crisis further increased opportunities for women. Heidi McDonell notes that Ottawa's smaller size fostered closer collaboration between men and women.

In a letter notifying physicians within the medical community, the emergence of the outbreak was described as 'rather devastating.' – The New York Times coverage on a rare cancer found in gay men, 1981.

On July 3, 1981, Barry Deeprose, a volunteer with Ottawa's Gayline, came across an unusual article on the organization's notice board. The article, sourced from The New York Times, July 3, 1981, "Rare Cancer Seen in 41 Homosexuals", highlighted a rare cancer found in gay men. "I had the sense that something dreadful had gone wrong," Deeprose recalls.

The Gayline faced an influx of anxious callers seeking information about AIDS. Operators, while uncertain, advised callers to shower before sex and avoid engaging in sexual activities with individuals displaying skin lesions. Barry Deeprose recalls, "People would be calling us to find out symptoms; people would be calling us with symptoms."

On August 24, 1982, Gays of Ottawa (GO) organized a public meeting with officials from Health and Welfare Canada's Laboratory Centre for Disease Control. Around seventy individuals attended seeking information, despite the limited knowledge available.

On September 11, 1982, Mayor Marion Dewar cut the pink ribbon at Ottawa's first feminist bookstore, the Ottawa Women's Bookstore, symbolizing a period of growth in the women's community. The mayor of Ottawa at that time was sincerely supportive of the lesbian and gay community.

In 1983, another emergency community meeting on AIDS at the Gays of Ottawa GO Centre drew a full house. Dr. Gordon Jessamine, chief epidemiologist at the Laboratory Centre for Disease Control in Ottawa, shared early, reliable information about AIDS. GO activist Lloyd Plunkett noted, "We had people standing in the hallways. They couldn't even see the speaker. People were really scared and wanted to know what was happening."

In 1983, Linda Wilson a 27-year-old chemist become the first female president of Gays of Ottawa (GO). She passed a bylaw that mandated equal representation between men and women on the board.

On July 19, 1983, 28-year-old Peter Evans became Ottawa's first identified AIDS patient, publicly disclosing his diagnosis to counter the recent flood of media misinformation.

During an August 28 radio show, Peter Evans engaged with host Bill Prankard, correcting misinformation and advocating for increased AIDS funding over shutting down establishments. Prankard suggested the epidemic might be a "judgment of God", prompting Peter to highlight the broader impact on patients with cancer and multiple sclerosis. The exchange led to complaints from Gays of Ottawa (GO) to the Canadian Radio-Television and Telecommunication Commission, citing the host's dissemination of false information and unbalanced coverage.

On October 1, 1983, the first AIDS Walkathon fundraiser took place, with Peter Evans leading the initial blocks of the walk. The route stretched from Ottawa to Kingston, raising over $5,000.

As of October 13, 1983, there were 44 reported cases of AIDS in Ottawa, according to Dr. Clayton. Among them, 40 cases involved men, and 4 cases involved women.

In November 1983, Gays of Ottawa (GO) co-founds the Ottawa-Hull Coalition against Bill C-157 and presents a brief on behalf of the Coalition for Gay Rights in Ontario (CGRO) to a Senate Committee examining Bill C-157 and federal government security provisions, including the RCMP and CSIS, which granted significant powers against the LGBT community.

On January 7, 1984, the LGBT community mourned the death of Peter Evans, Ottawa's first recorded AIDS casualty and the 35th Canadian reported to have died of AIDS. He died at the Ottawa General Hospital, which later became a prominent AIDS treatment center for the region.

July 9, 1985, the AIDS Committee of Ottawa (ACO) was established as a community-based organization co-founded by Barry Deeprose and Bob Read to respond to the emerging HIV/AIDS crisis. The ACO played a crucial role in providing support, education, and advocacy for individuals affected by HIV/AIDS in the Ottawa area. On August 7, 1987, the organization achieved a milestone by officially incorporating as a non-profit charity, coinciding with increased funding availability.

On October 9, 1985, the inaugural community information meeting, led by Barry Deeprose and featuring Dr. Gilles Melanson, who was the first openly gay doctor in Ottawa, drew a full house. The gathering occurred a month before the virus test became available in Canada, underscoring the attendees' palpable anticipation and concerns.

In 1986, the AIDS Committee of Ottawa (ACO) initiated various educational campaigns to promote safe sex:

- Condom Blitz: ACO executed a campaign distributing condoms and information across diverse venues, including bars. This initiative aimed to enhance awareness of safe sex practices.
- Innovative Demonstrations: They incorporated entertaining demonstrations during condom blitzes, using a zucchini and a wooden dowel named "Mr. Woody." These activities contributed to the overall effectiveness of their educational efforts.
- Captain Condom Campaign: ACO introduced a cartoon series featuring Captain Condom, portrayed in postcards. These postcards encouraged gay and bisexual men to take pride in their sexuality while promoting safer sex. The campaign emphasized diverse backgrounds and body types.
- Explicit Ads Controversy: ACO encountered controversy over explicit sexuality in ads, notably the Captain Condom series. Despite opposition, ACO sought to incorporate sexuality into social discourse to increase acceptability.

These multifaceted efforts reflect ACO's comprehensive strategy, combining condom distribution, visual campaigns, and engaging demonstrations to advocate safer sex practices and raise awareness about AIDS.

Established in 1986, the Canadian AIDS Society (CAS) emerged during the peak of the AIDS crisis with 16 initial members, including the AIDS Committee of Ottawa. Initially operating from a shared office in Edmonton, CAS achieved charitable status in 1988 and relocated to Ottawa. CAS serves as a national representative for its members, guided by the perspectives of people living with HIV/AIDS.

In May 1986, a gay student at Gloucester High School challenged homophobia by coming out in a letter to the school paper. Many students were outraged, and a petition was sent to the principal. Oscar's letter was one of many courageous acts in which gay, lesbian and bisexual students were coming out in Ottawa.

==== First Pride Event ====
On June 28, 1986, Ottawa hosted its first lesbian and gay Pride event, where around 50 individuals gathered at Strathcona Park for a picnic organized by the members of Gays of Ottawa. The event featured music, dancing, and vibrant balloons adorned with messages such as 'gay pride' and gender symbols representing the lesbian and gay community.

Following this historic moment, Ottawa Pride picnic events continue to this day, taking place in various parks across the city. Here is a list of the previous Pride picnics and their respective locations:

- 1986 - Strathcona Park
- 1987 - Strathcona Park
- 1988 - Jack Purcell Park
- 1989 - Jack Purcell Park
- 1990 - Jack Purcell Park
- 1991 - Ballantyne Park
- 1992 - Festival Plaza
- 1993 - Festival Plaza
- 1994 - Victoria Island
- 1995 - Wellington Park
- 1996 - Festival Plaza
- 1997 - Festival Plaza

In 1987, the province of Ontario allocates $164,000 to the AIDS Committee of Ottawa (ACO) for prevention and health services. ACO appoints Grant MacNeil as an interim executive director, succeeded by David Hoe in March 1988. During the first year, five staff members are hired.

On July 1, 1987, Martin Mallon, a gay man, was thrown off a cliff at Major's Hill Park in Ottawa and died two days later.

In July 1987, the Coalition for Gay Rights in Ontario acquires a draft of the Ministry of Education guidelines and ensures copies are sent to the Ontario AIDS Network. The AIDS Committee of Ottawa is able to respond, and the Ontario Human Rights Commission is requested to intervene to address the blatant homophobia in the document.

In September 1987, the Coalition for Gay Rights in Ontario (CGRO) changed its name to the Coalition for Lesbian & Gay Rights in Ontario (CLGRO).

On October 16, 1987, Regional Chair Andrew Haydon opposed AIDS funding, expressing reluctance to support programs targeting a specific group. Later, he proposed mandatory AIDS testing for all regional employees. In response, Federal Health Minister Perrin Beatty rebuked Haydon's call for compulsory testing.

In May 1988, AIDS Action Now activists organized a press conference in front of Parliament Hill in Ottawa, publicly consuming non-approved drug treatments to protest the government's restrictions through the Emergency Drug Release Program. They published a guide with information obtained from the Fourth International Conference on AIDS in Stockholm, held from June 12 to 16, 1988.

In September 1988, Bruce House, an AIDS hospice located in Ottawa, was established to provide housing assistance and hospice care for individuals affected by AIDS. The AIDS Committee of Ottawa hired five employees to manage its growing services. Originating as a sub-committee of the AIDS Committee of Ottawa, known as the AIDS Housing Group, Bruce House sought funding and a home to support primarily gay men in the advanced stages of the disease. Officially incorporated on October 6, 1989, Bruce House remains active today.

On December 1, 1988, the World Health Organization officially declared World AIDS Day.

In 1989, the AIDS Committee of Ottawa (ACO) played a pivotal role in advocating for the introduction of anonymous HIV testing in the province. This initiative aimed to provide a crucial incentive for gay men to undergo testing, contributing to the broader efforts in HIV/AIDS prevention and support in the Ottawa community. In October 1989, the ACO reported 52 deaths and identified 46 individuals living with AIDS in Ottawa.

==== First Pride Week and Pride Parade ====
On June 9, 1989, the first-ever Lesbian and Gay Pride Week in Ottawa unfolded from June 9 to June 18, culminating in the city's first-ever Ottawa Pride Parade on Sunday, June 18. Organized by the members of Gays of Ottawa (GO), the parade kicked off at Somerset and Metcalfe, concluding at the picnic site in Jack Purcell Park. Organizers estimated around 300 marchers participated in this historic event for the local community.

Pride Week Exhibit: June 15 to 18, 1989, organized by the AIDS Committee of Ottawa, the U.S. Names Project AIDS Memorial Quilt exhibit was featured at Lansdowne Park in the Coliseum building. Showcasing 1,200 panels, including 268 from Canadian contributors, and attracted approximately 4,000 visitors, marking a significant chapter in the commemoration of those impacted by AIDS in Ottawa.

On June 27, 1989, Gays of Ottawa (GO) changed its name to the Association of Lesbians and Gays of Ottawa (ALGO).

==== Escalation of violence in Major's Hill Park in 1989 ====
From June 18 to July 31, 1989, a series of tragic incidents unfolded at Major's Hill Park in Ottawa. On June 18, Peter Vainola, a local plumber and singer, met an unfortunate death after falling from the cliffs. Subsequently, on July 1, Norman Chenier and Phillip Jennings both experienced falls from the same cliffs, with Chenier requiring intensive care and Jennings in serious condition. Charles Papps suffered non-life-threatening injuries on July 15. Another violent attack happened on July 31 when John Richard Miller lost his life after being thrown off the cliff.

On August 21 to 22, 1989, Alain Brosseau was thrown off the Alexandra Bridge into the Ottawa River, resulting in his death. On the same night, Alain Fortin and Wilfred Gauthier were brutally attacked in their home by a gang of six youths, the same group involved in Brosseau's murder. Gauthier suffered a throat slash, and Fortin was stabbed in the eye and hand; fortunately, both survived the assault.

LGBT community faced discrimination, violence, and inadequate police protection.

=== Challenges and legal victories (1990s) ===
In 1990, the second Ottawa Pride Parade encountered an unexpected hurdle when the City Council initially proclaimed it as "Lesbian and Gay Pride Day" on June 17, 1990. However, this proclamation was later withdrawn due to its coinciding with Father's Day. Despite this setback, Pride Week coordinator Graham Haig took swift legal action, leading to a favorable ruling by an Ontario Supreme Court judge. This triumph not only reinstated the proclamation but also ensured the Parade proceeded as planned. Nevertheless, this legal victory marked the beginning of a challenging period for Ottawa Pride in the 1990s, as the organization became embroiled in local political battles over proclamations.

In 1991, the city opted to omit the term "Pride" from its declaration, choosing "Lesbian and Gay Day" over the initially used "Lesbian and Gay Pride Day" in 1990. The organizers reluctantly accepted this decision, expressing concern over City Council's failure to acknowledge the significance and empowerment linked with the concept of pride within the Lesbian and Gay community.

In 1992, tensions escalated when Mayor Jacquelin Holzman, responding to the proclamation request, explicitly excluded "bisexuals" by rewriting the declaration. The Ottawa City Council voted against the inclusion of "bisexuals" in the official proclamation, opting instead for the stigmatizing phrase "alternative lifestyles.”

This controversial decision prompted activist Kathryn Payne to file a complaint with the Ontario Human Rights Commission. This marked the beginning of a prolonged legal battle to advocate for the inclusion of bisexuality in the naming and mayoral proclamation for Ottawa's Pride Week. The dispute persisted for five years before a settlement was finally reached, and Payne emerged victorious shortly before Mayor Jacquelin Holzman's retirement in 1997.

Amidst this struggle, in 1996 the Chief Commissioner Maxwell Yalden made the following statement: "... the Universal Declaration of the United Nations on Human Rights, and indeed the Canadian Human Rights Act, says all human beings are equal in their rights. All. That doesn't mean all minus homosexuals."

On April 29, 1996, the federal Justice Minister Allan Rock introduced Bill C-33 to include sexual orientation as a prohibited ground of discrimination covered in the Canadian Human Rights Act; Royal Assent was granted on June 20, 1996.

In 1997, the Regional Chair of Ottawa-Carleton Peter Clark proclaimed "Lesbian, Gay, Bisexual, and Transgender Pride Week." The settlement with the Ontario Human Rights Commission and the amendment to the Canadian Human Rights Act strengthened LGBT rights. It's noteworthy that these advancements occurred just before the retirement of Mayor Holzman, concluding a five-year battle for recognition and equal rights with the City of Ottawa.

==== Pride Events Moved from June to July ====
In 1994, Ottawa Pride events, encompassing the week-long festival, Pride Picnic, and the Pride Parade, made a move to July, a shift that endured until the conclusion of 2004, spanning the following 10 years.

On July 17, 1994, Joanne Law and Diana Coltridge walked in the Ottawa Pride Parade under the Gender Mosaic banner, marking a significant first.

The Ottawa Pride Picnic and some of the festival events occur at Festival Plaza at Ottawa City Hall from 1996 to 2001.

On May 9, 1997, the Pride Week Committee (National Capital Region) / Comité de la semaine de la fierté (Région de la capitale nationale) was incorporated in Ottawa, Ontario. It operates as a Not-for-Profit Corporation and is currently listed as active.

May 21, 1997, marked a significant decision by the Ottawa City Council, voting 8 to 2 in favor of adding "bisexual" and "transgender" to the Pride Week proclamation. This choice designated July 12 to 20, 1997, as the inaugural Lesbian, Gay, Bisexual, and Transgender (LGBT) Pride Week in Ottawa.

On July 13, 1997, the Pride flag was raised for the first time at Ottawa City Hall.

In 1998, Prime Minister Jean Chrétien, in a letter for Pride Week, emphasized the significance of diversity as a source of strength in Canadian society. He underscores Canada's commitment to being a nation where individuals can be different and equal simultaneously. The letter emphasizes the importance of the Canadian Human Rights Act, advocating for equal opportunities without discrimination based on various factors. Chrétien calls for the continued effort to nurture and protect these principles, ensuring Canada remains a country of inclusiveness, tolerance, and justice. The Ottawa Pride Week Committee further ensured its visibility by printing PM Chrétien's letter on page three of the Ottawa-Hull July 10–19, 1998 Pride Week Festival guide, themed "Pride for All Seasons!" This allowed the message to reach a broader audience within the LGBTQ community.

=== Transformation and challenges (2000s) ===
In 2002 the Pride Committee moved the Pride event from the Festival Plaza to Bank Street (Ottawa's Gay Village) with support from the Bank Street BIA.

From July 8 to 14, 2002, Ottawa Police and the LGBT Police Liaison Committee actively participated in Pride events. They reported a historic milestone with a record-breaking attendance of over 55,000 people at the July 14th Pride parade.

On June 11, 2003, Renée Sauve and Tracey Braun made history as the first same-sex couple to be married in Ottawa.

Commencing on November 20, 2003, the first Transgender Day of Remembrance vigil in Ottawa was held at the Human Rights Monument on Elgin Street. Approximately 50 attendees, including various transgender individuals, were present, alongside members from Pink Triangle Services, Pflag, Egale, the Ottawa Police Service, and local union representatives. The vigil was organized by Melanie P.

On July 10, 2004, the inaugural Ottawa Dyke March took place, signifying solidarity with dyke marches globally. Over the years, this event has expanded from a march, rally, and community picnic to also serve as a deliberate and peaceful political protest. The Ottawa Dyke March aims to enhance the visibility of dykes, advocate for political change, and protest against the corporatization of the Pride Parade, among other vital causes. In 2006, for instance, after the march, participants had a picnic complemented by a variety show and other events, furthering the event's alignment with its core values. The theme for 2018 was 'Dykes Shaping the Arts,' placing a spotlight on dyke artists for the first time.

==== Pride Rescheduled from July to August ====
In 2005, the Pride Festival was relocated from Bank Street back to Festival Plaza due to high costs and Pride Committee's outstanding debts. Additionally, the festival dates were rescheduled from July to August due to availability constraints at the Festival Plaza. This is why Ottawa's Pride festival takes place in mid-August, hosting its Pride Parade in late August.

Published on August 25, 2005, Allendria Brunjes of The Charlatan newspaper at Carleton University interviews Tamara Stammis, the chair of planning and events for Ottawa Pride Week:

Allendria Brunjes states in her article:

- This year the celebration started August 19 and will run until August 28, 2005 the day of the pride parade.

Allendria Brunjes quotes Tamara Stammis:

- "the events this year are not at the same place or time as usual due to financial issues."
- "We had to move the date and the site because it was not feasible for us to close Bank Street again," she said, adding that "Festival Plaza, where most of the events are being held, was the best option and it was booked at other plausible times."

=== Financial challenges and rebranding ===
Starting in 2006, the Pride Week Committee of Ottawa-Gatineau faced financial challenges, leading to a five-year hiatus in printing the Pride Guide. Capital Xtra stepped in, publishing the Ultimate Pride Guide during this period until the end of 2010.

Between 2006 and 2008, the Ottawa Pride festival underwent a rebranding, changing its name from Ottawa Pride to Capital Pride.

=== Evolution and milestones (2010s) ===
In 2010, Pride Week included a rugby match between Canada's only two predominantly gay rugby teams, the Toronto Muddy York and the Ottawa Wolves. The historic match was played on the main lawn of Parliament on August 28, 2010.

On November 20, 2010, Ottawa's Transgender Day of Remembrance featured the inaugural use of the "Trans Flag", designed by Michelle Lindsay. The event marked its significance with official unveilings by Ottawa Police, Paramedics, and City Halls in both Ottawa and Gatineau in 2010 and 2011.

August 2011 marked a significant moment as, for the first time in five years, the Pride Week Committee produced its official Pride Guide for the Capital Pride Festival in Ottawa and Gatineau.

On October 14, 2011, Jamie Hubley, son of Ottawa city councillor Allan Hubley, tragically took his own life after enduring relentless anti-gay bullying. His struggles, starting in Grade 7, included incidents like students attempting to force batteries into his mouth due to his preference for figure skating over ice hockey|hockey. In response, numerous Canadian media and political figures contributed videos to the online It Gets Better Project. Additionally, spurred by Jamie Hubley's heartbreaking experience, the Legislative Assembly of Ontario passed a 2012 act imposing stricter penalties for bullying in schools.

On November 4, 2011, Ottawa officially designates Bank Street in Centretown as the 'Gay Village,' adorned with rainbow signs.

In 2014, Capital Pride ran into financial troubles after 'accounting irregularities' kept the organization from paying vendors over $100,000. The organization declared bankruptcy in December 2014.

In early 2015, Ottawa Capital Pride implemented a new governance structure, introducing the Community Advisory Committee for direction and policies, and the Festival Operations Committee for managing the annual festival. They rebranded, adopting the term 'Rainbow Community' and a 'Super Rainbow' logo, while naming the festival Fierté dans la Capital(e) Pride Festival.

On June 1, 2016, a historic moment unfolded on Parliament Hill in Ottawa as Prime Minister Justin Trudeau raised the Pride flag for the first time in Canadian history. This symbolic gesture acknowledged the persistent efforts of those who tirelessly fought for equal rights for LGBT Canadians.

In July 2017, Ottawa Capital Pride requested off-duty Ottawa Police attending the August festival not to wear uniforms during the parade to foster inclusivity. Initially opposed, Chief Bordeleau later agreed, fostering dialogue with LGBTQ2 police. The request aimed to address discomfort in marginalized communities, showcasing a commitment to progress despite disagreements and acknowledging complexities in building trust and inclusivity.

On August 27, 2017, Prime Minister Justin Trudeau made history as the first sitting prime minister to participate in the Ottawa Capital Pride parade. Additionally, General Jonathan Vance, the Chief of the Defence Staff, joined other senior members of the Canadian Armed Forces, including heads of the army and navy. A substantial LGBTQ2 contingent of approximately 100 uniformed military personnel contributed to the parade, celebrating the strength found in diversity.

On November 28, 2017, Prime Minister Justin Trudeau delivered a historic apology in the House of Commons, acknowledging the injustices faced by LGBTQ Canadians during the Gay Purges. Many were criminally charged or dismissed from the Canadian military, mounted police, or federal public service due to their sexual orientation.

From August 19 to 26, 2018, Ottawa Pride hosted its largest pride celebration to date, drawing a record-breaking attendance of over 105,000 festival-goers.

On August 17, 2019, Ottawa Mayor Jim Watson publicly came out as gay, marking a historic moment just before Pride Week. His revelation made history as he became Ottawa's first openly gay mayor.

Capital Pride announced the appointment of its first-ever executive director, Osmel Guerra Maynes, on January 6, 2020.

=== COVID-19 pandemic (2020-2021) ===
2020

On May 11, 2020, Ottawa's in-person Pride festival and parade were cancelled due to the COVID-19 pandemic in Canada. Ontario's state of emergency extension and the City of Ottawa's prohibition on city-led mass events, parades, and festivities prompted this decision.

Capital Pride opted for an online 'Virtual Festival' held from August 23 to 30, 2020, themed 'Wherever We Are.' The event featured a Miss Capital Pride pageant, won by Icesis Couture, who later triumphed in the second season of Canada's Drag Race in 2021.

2021

The Virtual Capital Pride Festival took place from August 22 to 29, 2021, with the theme 'We Still Demand!' commemorating the 50th anniversary of the historic 'We Demand Rally' for LGBT rights on Parliament Hill on August 28, 1971.

On August 11, 2021, it was announced that a limited-capacity, one-day, in-person event would be held outdoors on the Great Lawn at Lansdowne Park, taking place on Sunday, August 29, 2021, from 3:00 pm to 10:00 pm.

=== After the pandemic (2022-present) ===
On June 1, 2022, the Ottawa Trans Library opened in the Hintonburg neighbourhood as a non-profit lending library and community center focused on trans issues. Its collection includes works by trans authors and fiction with trans characters, serving as an educational resource hub for both the Ottawa trans community and the general public.

Hate Crimes Surge: Reported hate crimes against transgender, agender, and sexual orientation have surged in recent years, according to Statistics Canada.

- In 2021, there were 33 alleged hate crimes targeting transgender or agender individuals, compared to 7 in 2016. Similarly, hate crimes based on sexual orientation rose from 176 incidents in 2016 to 423 in 2021, indicating a 64% increase between 2020 and 2021.
- The Ottawa Police Service noted a 23.5% increase in hate-and-bias-motivated incidents since 2022, highlighting the prevalence of transphobia within society. Of the 221 reported hate-motivated incidents in the city, 32 targeted the 2SLGBTQIA+ community, ranking second after the Jewish community.

Chief Eric Stubbs emphasized the likelihood of underreporting of hate crimes and hate-and-bias-motivated incidents against the 2SLGBTQIA+ community, acknowledging their actual prevalence is higher. He stressed the importance of reporting these incidents, noting that police data provides only a partial understanding of the issue.

On August 25, 2023, in downtown Ottawa, the March for Trans Rights took place, advocating for increased support and visibility for transgender individuals. Co-organizer Fae Johnstone, also the grand marshal of the 2023 Capital Pride Parade, emphasized the importance of solidarity and action amidst ongoing challenges faced by the trans community. The march highlighted concerns regarding safer schools, refugee support, healthcare access, and discrimination.

Speakers at the trans rally included Fae Johnstone, Jade Peek, co-organizer and Director of Operations with Kind Space, Celeste Trianon, a trans advocate and organizer of the Montreal Trans March, Tara Sypniewski, a trans historian and founder of the Ottawa Trans Library, and Sharp Dopler, a carrier of ceremony and LGBT Purge survivor. They collectively discussed the importance of inclusive policies and societal acceptance, reaffirming their commitment to fostering a safe and inclusive environment for all participants despite potential challenges.

On August 27, 2023, the annual Pride Parade attracted thousands of participants and spectators to downtown Ottawa streets adorned with rainbow colours. Approximately 10,000 individuals took part in the parade, with thousands more lining the route along Elgin Street, Gladstone Avenue, and Kent Street. Participants highlighted the significance of attending the parade in light of concerns over increasing anti-trans hate across Canada. Fae Johnstone, the Grand Marshal of the parade, stressed the importance of solidarity and advocacy within the 2SLGBTQIA+ community.

In conjunction with the parade, the federal government announced funding of up to $1.9 million for seven 2SLGBTQI+ organizations in the Ottawa area. This funding coincided with the parade and underscores the government's commitment to supporting 2SLGBTQI+ initiatives and organizations in the region.

On August 6, 2024, Ottawa Capital Pride published a statement on their website expressing solidarity with Palestinians, including references to an "ongoing genocide" in Gaza. This statement became the focal point of significant controversy, particularly drawing backlash from several Jewish organizations.

In response, Ottawa Mayor Mark Sutcliffe announced that he would not attend any Capital Pride events in 2024. Following this, the Children's Hospital of Eastern Ontario (CHEO) and the Ottawa Hospital also decided to withdraw their participation from the parade. CHEO's CEO, Alex Munter, cited concerns that the Pride Parade had shifted from supporting the 2SLGBTQ+ community to protesting Israel, making some members of the community feel unsafe or unwelcome.

== Ottawa Pride Festival timeline ==
The first recorded Ottawa Pride event took place on June 28, 1986, and marked the beginning of Pride celebrations in the city.

The first Ottawa Pride Parade took place on Sunday June 18, 1989.

The second Ottawa Pride Parade occurred on June 17, 1990. Initially, City Council proclaimed it "Lesbian and Gay Pride Day", but later withdrew the proclamation due to its conflict with Father's Day. Nevertheless, following legal action led by Pride Week coordinator Graham Haig, an Ontario Supreme Court judge ruled in favor of Ottawa Pride, reinstating the day and allowing the parade to proceed. Despite this legal victory, Ottawa Pride was not immune to the local political disputes that characterized much of the 1990s, which included ongoing conflicts over proclamations.

Over the years, the Ottawa Capital Pride Parade has grown in size and significance, attracting participants and spectators from various backgrounds who come together to show their support and solidarity.

=== Main Pride Festival Events ===
Ottawa pride parades, events and dates
Year	Event and date	Year	Event and date
1986	Pride Event: June 28, 1986	1987	Pride Event: June 1987
1986	Pride Picnic: Strathcona Park	1987	Pride Picnic: Strathcona Park
1988	Pride Event: June 1988	1989	Pride Event: June 9–18, 1989
1988	Pride Parade: NA	1989	Pride Parade: June 18, 1989 (1st Pride Parade)
1988	Pride Picnic: Jack Purcell Park	1989	Pride Picnic: Jack Purcell Park (June 18)
1990	Pride March: June 17, 1990 (2nd Pride Parade court-ordered)	1991	Pride Parade: June 23, 1991 (3rd Pride Parade)
1990	Pride Picnic: Jack Purcell Park	1991	Pride Picnic: Ballantyne Park
1992	Pride Festival: June 12–21, 1992	1993	Pride Festival: June 11–20, 1993
1992	Pride Parade: June 21, 1992	1993	Pride Parade: June 20, 1993
1992	Pride Picnic: Festival Plaza	1993	Pride Picnic: Festival Plaza
1994	Pride Festival: July ? - 17, 1994	1995	Pride Festival: July 15–24, 1995
1994	Pride Parade: July 17, 1994	1995	Pride Parade: July 24, 1995
1994	Pride Picnic: Victoria Island	1995	Pride Picnic: Wellington Park
1996	Pride Festival: July 13–21, 1996	1997	Pride Festival: July 12–20, 1997
1996	Pride Parade: July 14, 1996	1997	Pride Parade: July 13, 1997
1996	Pride Picnic: Festival Plaza (July 14)	1997	Pride Picnic: Festival Plaza (July 13)
1998	Pride Festival: July 10–19, 1998	1999	Pride Festival: July 9–18, 1999
1998	Pride Parade: July 12, 1998	1999	Pride Parade: July 11, 1999
1998	Pride Picnic: Festival Plaza (July 12)	1999	Pride Picnic: Festival Plaza (July 11)
2000	Pride Festival: July 7–16, 2000	2001	Pride Festival: July 6–15, 2001
2000	Pride Parade: July 9, 2000	2001	Pride Parade: July 8, 2001
2000	Pride Picnic: Festival Plaza (July 9)	2001	Pride Picnic: Festival Plaza (July 8)
2002	Pride Festival: July 8–14, 2002	2003	Pride Festival: July 7–13, 2003
2002	Pride Parade: July 14, 2002	2003	Pride Parade: July 13, 2003
2002	Pride Picnic: Bank Street (July 14)	2003	Pride Picnic: Bank Street (July 13)
2004	Pride Festival: July 5–11, 2004	2005	Pride Festival: August 19–28, 2005
2004	Pride Parade: July 11, 2004	2005	Pride Parade: August 28, 2005
2004	Pride Picnic: McNabb Park (July 10)	2005	Pride Picnic: Festival Plaza (Aug 28)
2006	Pride Festival: August 21–27, 2006	2007	Pride Festival: August 17–26, 2007
2006	Pride Parade: August 27, 2006	2007	Pride Parade: August 26, 2007
2006	Pride Picnic: Festival Plaza	2007	Pride Picnic: Festival Plaza (Aug 26)
2008	Pride Festival: August 18–24, 2008	2009	Pride Festival: August 21–30, 2009
2008	Pride Parade: August 24, 2008	2009	Pride Parade: August 30, 2009
2008	Pride Picnic: Minto Park (Aug 23)	2009	Pride Picnic: Festival Plaza
2010	Pride Festival: August 20–29, 2010	2011	Pride Festival: August 19–28, 2011
2010	Pride Parade: August 29, 2010	2011	Pride Parade: August 28, 2011
2010	Pride Picnic: Jack Purcell Park (Aug 24)	2011	Pride Picnic: Hintonburg Park (Aug 23)
2012	Pride Festival: August 17–26, 2012	2013	Pride Festival: August 16–25, 2013
2012	Pride Parade: August 26, 2012	2013	Pride Parade: August 25, 2013
2012	Pride Picnic: Hintonburg Park (Aug 21)	2013	Pride Picnic: Hintonburg Park (Aug 20)
2014	Pride Festival: August 15–24, 2014	2015	Pride Festival: August 17–23, 2015
2014	Pride Parade: August 24, 2014	2015	Pride Parade: August 23, 2015
2014	Pride Picnic: Hintonburg Park (Aug 19)	2015	Pride Picnic: Hintonburg Park (Aug 19)
2016	Pride Festival: August 15–21, 2016	2017	Pride Festival: August 21–27, 2017
2016	Pride Parade: August 21, 2016	2017	Pride Parade: August 27, 2017
2016	Pride Picnic: Hintonburg Park (Aug 17)	2017	Pride Picnic: Hintonburg Park (Aug 23)
2018	Pride Festival: August 19–26, 2018	2019	Pride Festival: August 18–25, 2019
2018	Pride Parade: August 26, 2018	2019	Pride Parade: August 25, 2019
2018	Pride Picnic: Hintonburg Park (Aug 19)	2019	Pride Picnic: Hintonburg Park (Aug 18)
2020	Pride Virtual Festival: August 23–30, 2020	2021	Pride Virtual Festival: August 22–29, 2021
2020	Pride Parade and picnic cancelled due to the pandemic	2021	Pride Parade: cancelled due to the pandemic
2020	Global Pride online event: June 27, 2020	2021	Pride Event: one day event August 29, 2021
2022	Pride Festival: August 21–28, 2022	2023	Pride Festival: August 19–27, 2023
2022	Pride Parade: August 28, 2022	2023	Pride Parade: August 27, 2023
2022	Pride Picnic: Hintonburg Park (Aug 21)	2023	Pride Picnic: Hintonburg Park (Aug 20)
2024	Pride Festival: August 17–25, 2024	2025	Pride Festival: August 16–24, 2025 (tentative)
2024	Pride Parade: August 25, 2024	2025	Pride Parade: August 24, 2025 (tentative)
2024	Pride Picnic: Hintonburg Park (Aug 18)	2025	Pride Picnic: (tentative)

While Ottawa Pride Parades typically take place on the fourth Sunday of August, there may be occasional variations due to factors such as event planning, logistics, and community considerations.

== Winter Pride ==
Winter Pride is an annual festival in Ottawa and Gatineau, collaborating with Winterlude, managed by Canadian Heritage since 1979. Ottawa Pride joined in 2019.

Stay informed about the latest 2SLGBTQI+ events during Winterlude by using the official calendar filter on the Winterlude website.

=== Winter Pride Festival Events ===
Ottawa winter pride festivals and ice parades schedule
Year	Event and date	Year	Event and date
2019	Winter Pride Festival: February 6–10, 2019	2020	Winter Pride Festival: February 4–9, 2020
2019	Ice Pride Parade: February 10, 2019	2020	Ice Pride Parade: February 9, 2020
2021	Winter Virtual Pride: February 8–12, 2021	2022	Winter Virtual Pride: February 5–10, 2022
2021	Ice Pride Parade: cancelled due to the pandemic	2022	Ice Pride Parade: cancelled due to the pandemic
2023	Winter Pride Festival: February 8–12, 2023	2024	Winter Pride Festival: February 5–11, 2024
2023	Ice Pride Parade: February 12, 2023	2024	Ice Pride Parade: February 11, 2024
2025	Winter Pride Festival: February 3–9, 2025 (tentative)	2026	Winter Pride Festival: February 2–8, 2026 (tentative)
2025	Ice Pride Parade: February 9, 2025 (tentative)	2026	Ice Pride Parade: February 8, 2026 (tentative)

== Gallery ==
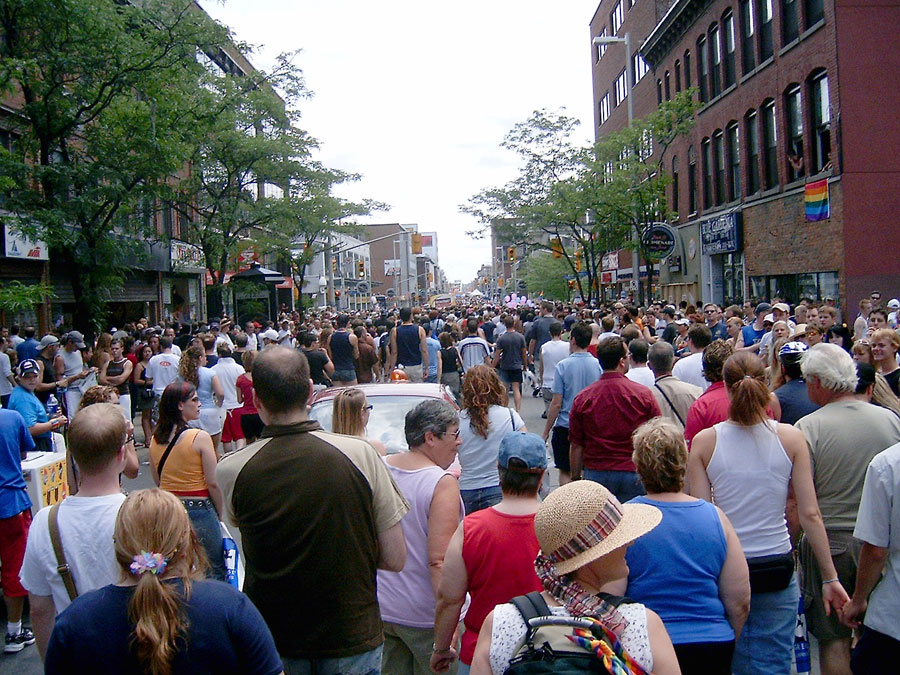
2004's parade on Bank Street in Ottawa

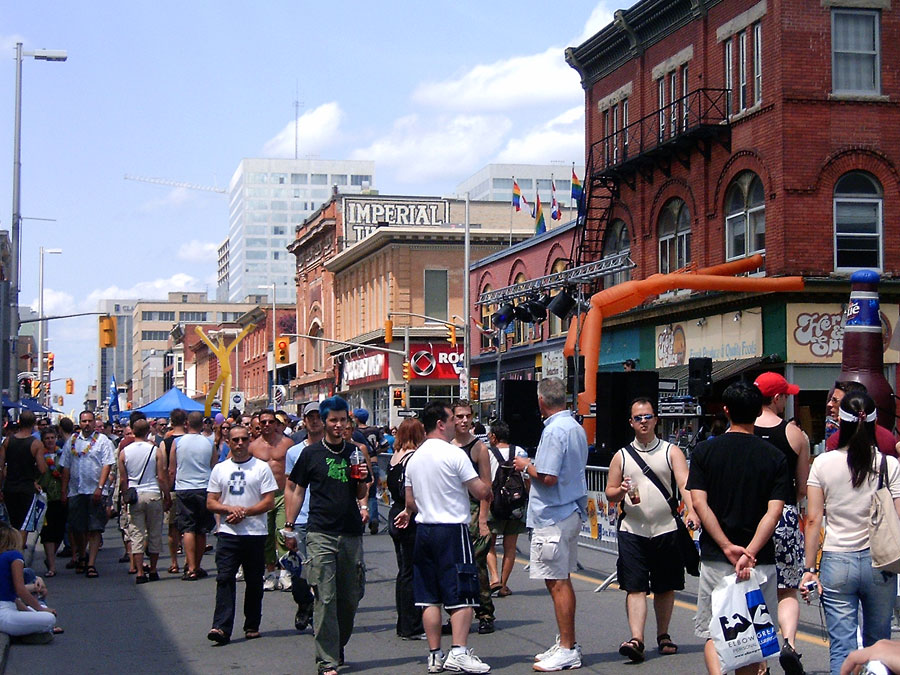
2004's after-parade street party on Bank Street

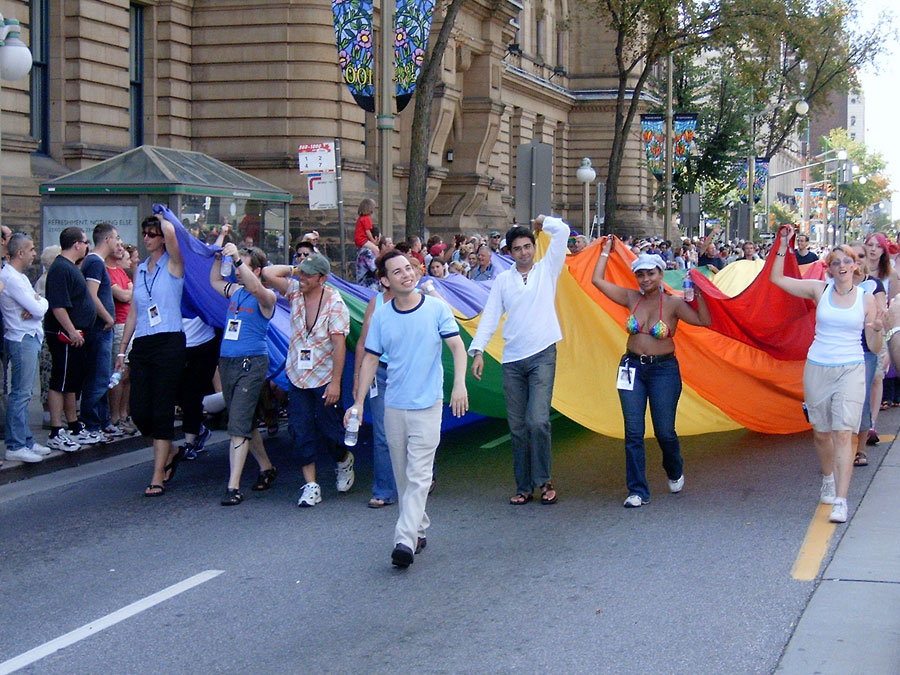
Alex Munter on Wellington Street heading the 2005 parade

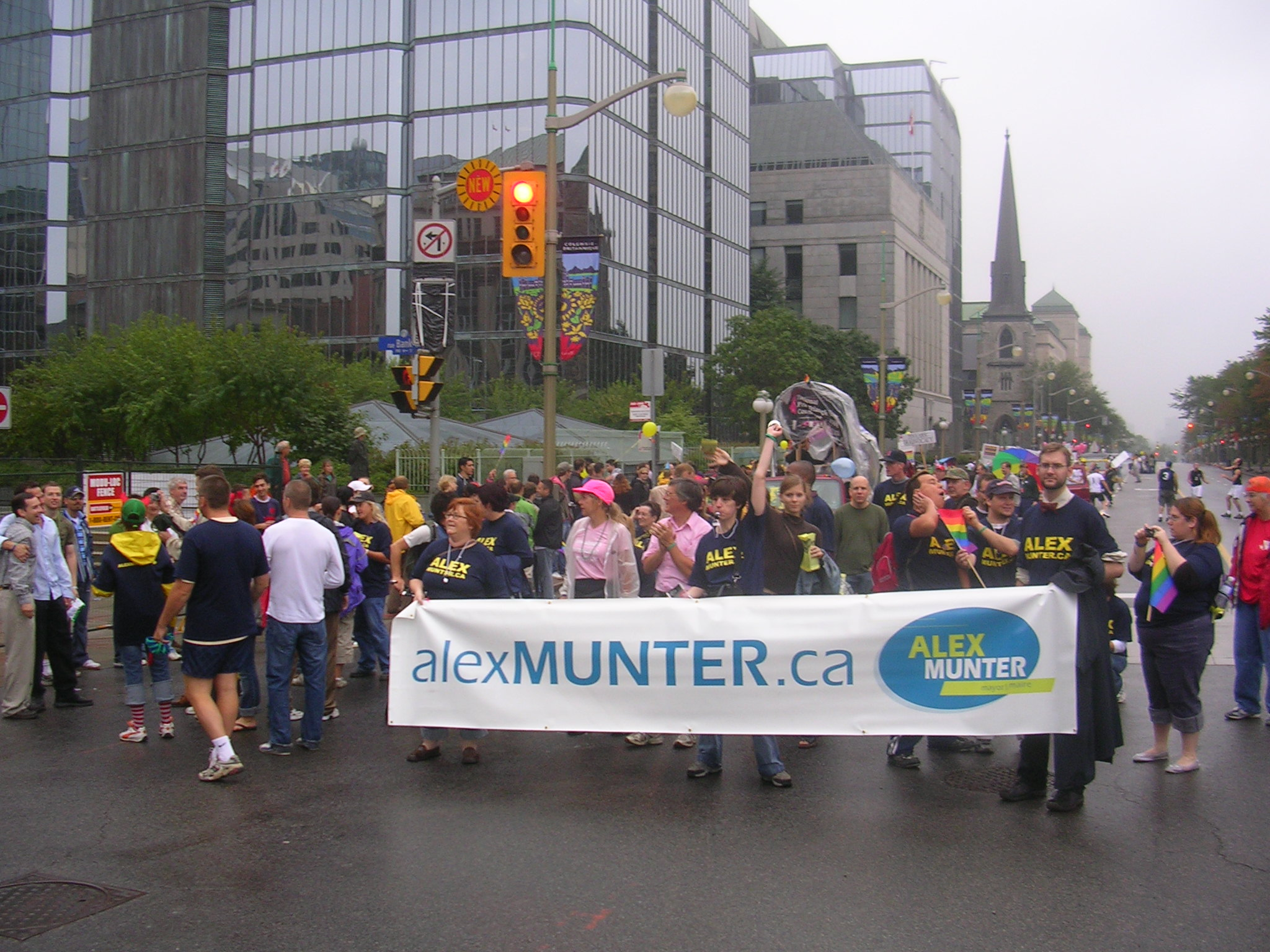
Alex Munter mayoral campaign at the 2006 parade

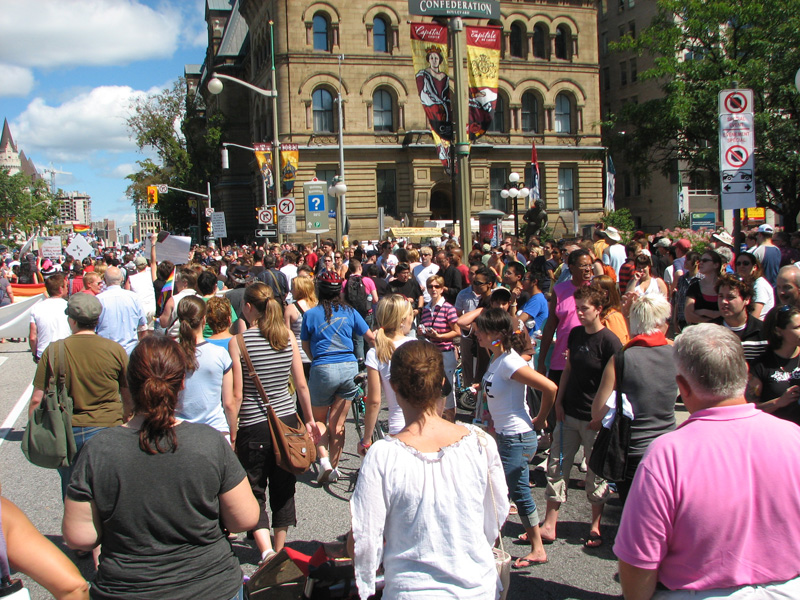
Onlookers and supporters in the 2007's parade, Wellington Street

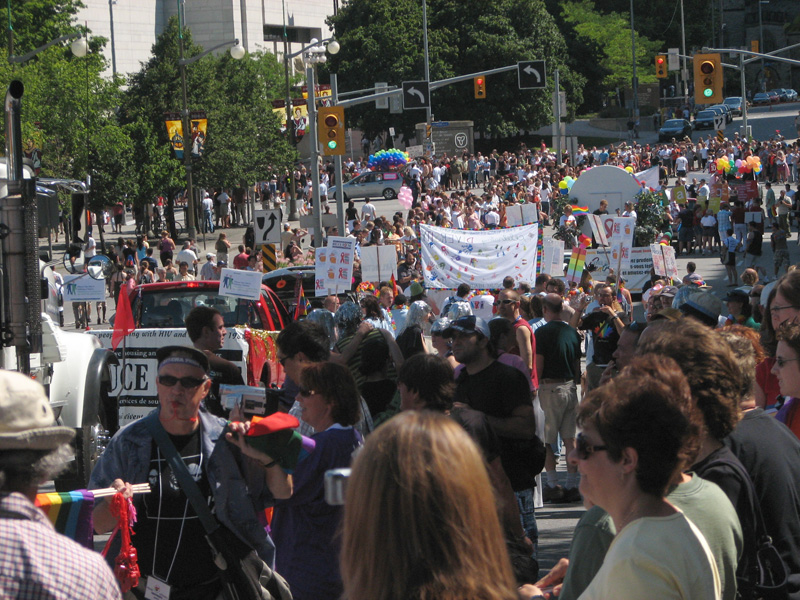
2007's parade on Elgin Street in Ottawa

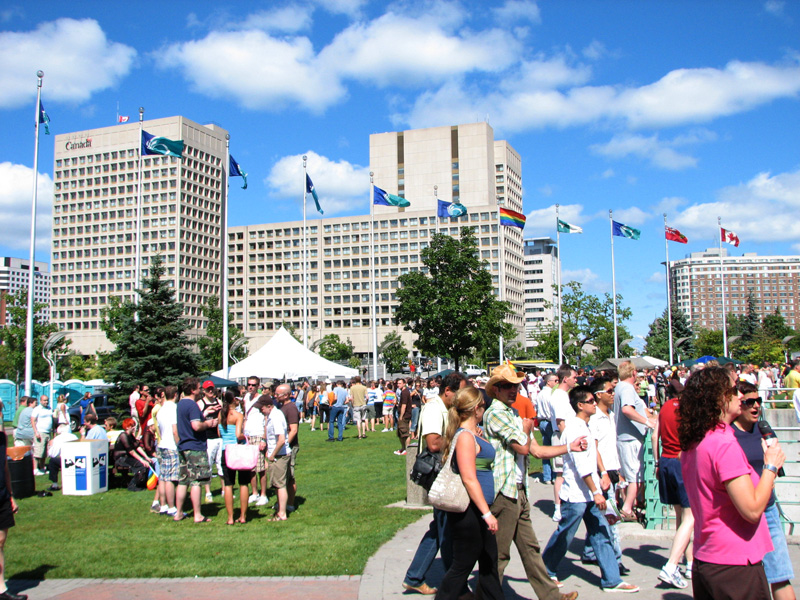
2007's street party at the Festival Plaza on Ottawa's City Hall grounds

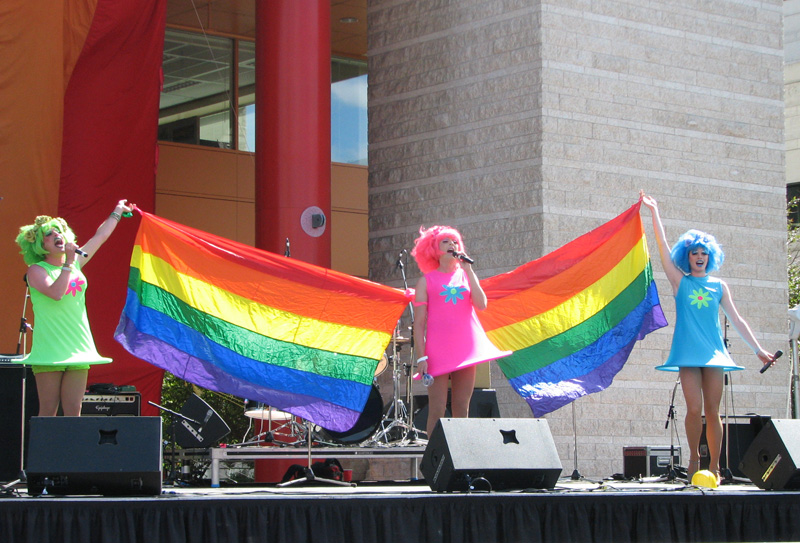
The B-girlz performing at the 2007 Capital Pride

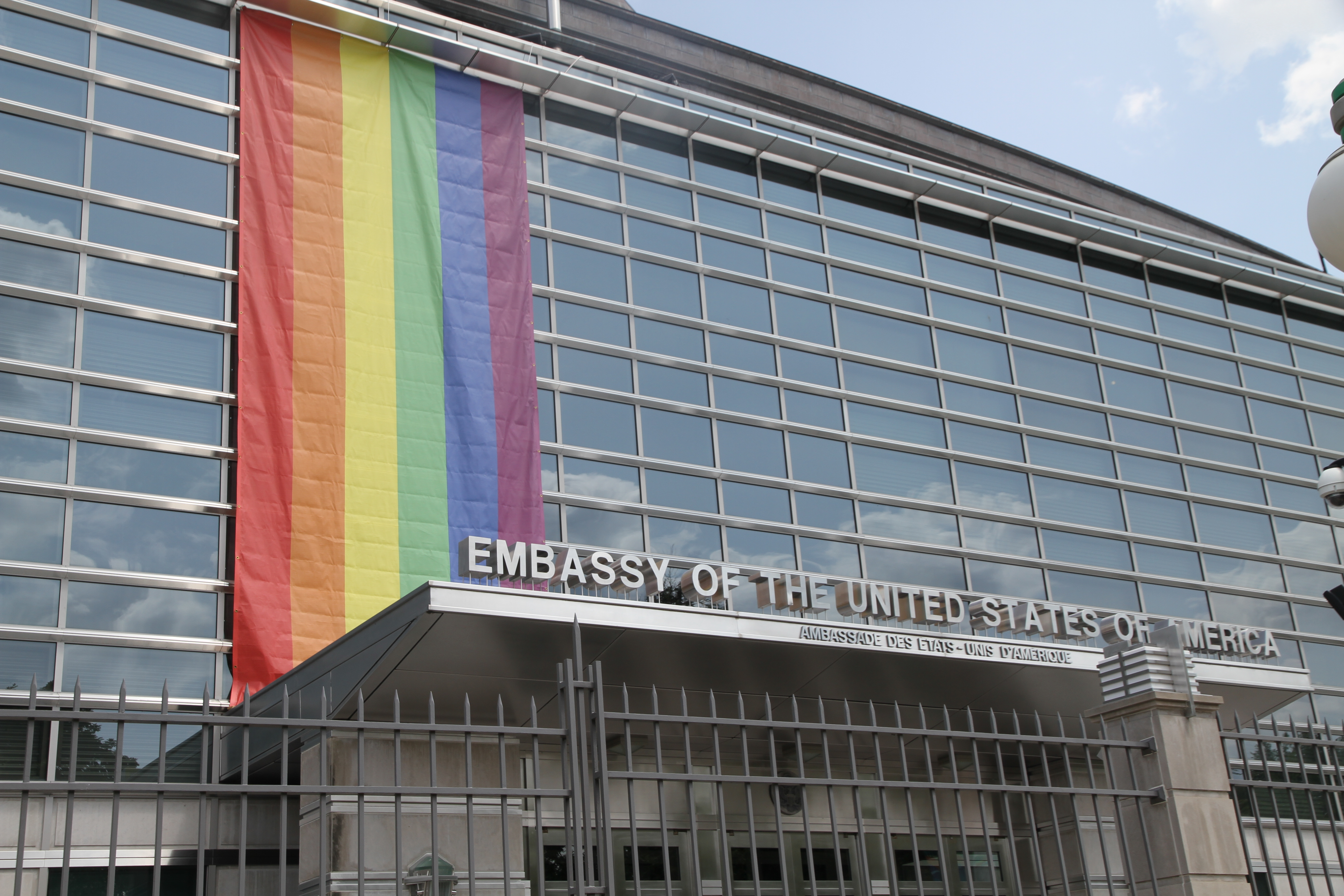
The U.S. Embassy in Ottawa showing support for Pride, 2014

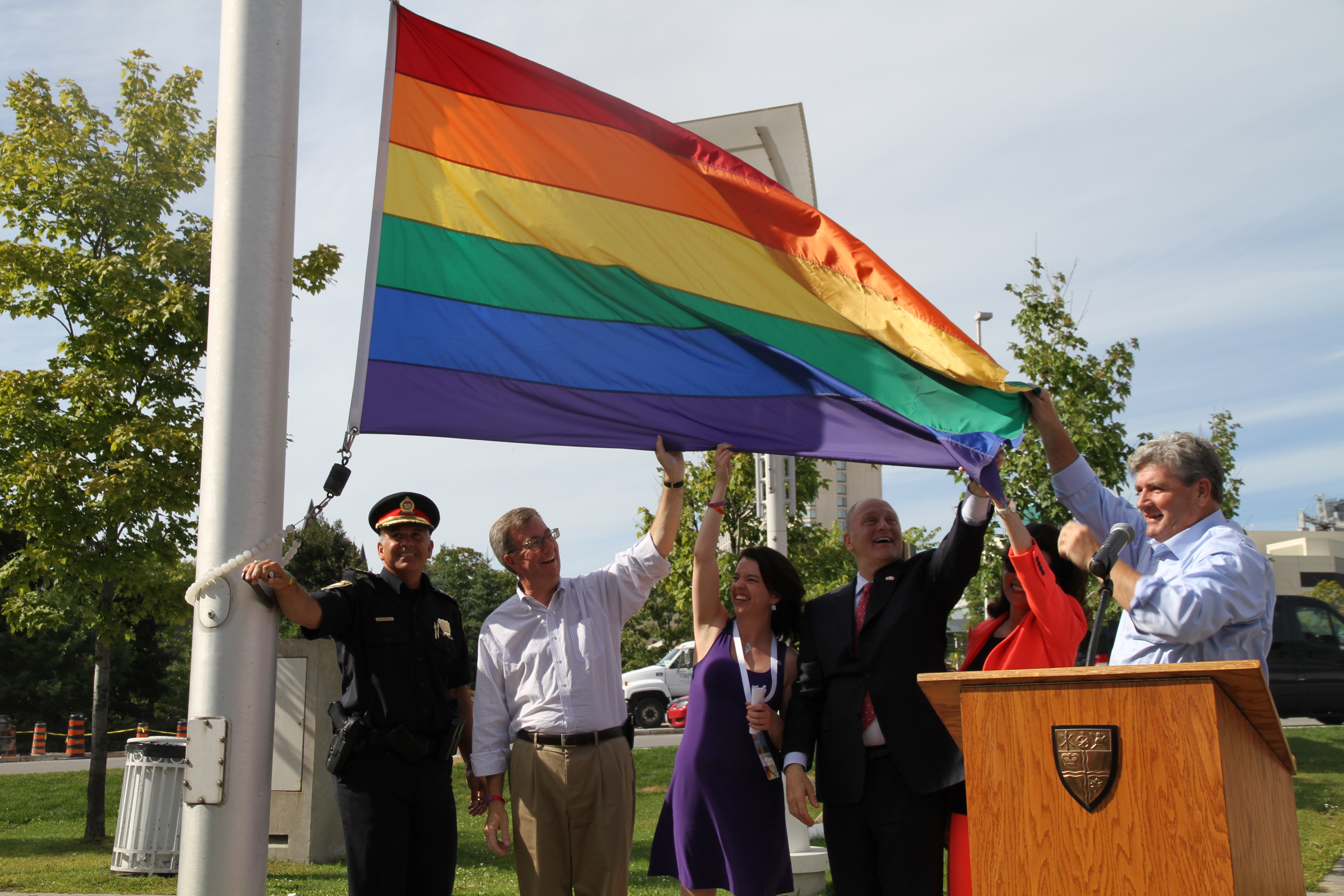
Chief Charles Bordeleau, Mayor Jim Watson, Pride chair Jodie McNamara, and US Ambassador Bruce Heyman in 2014

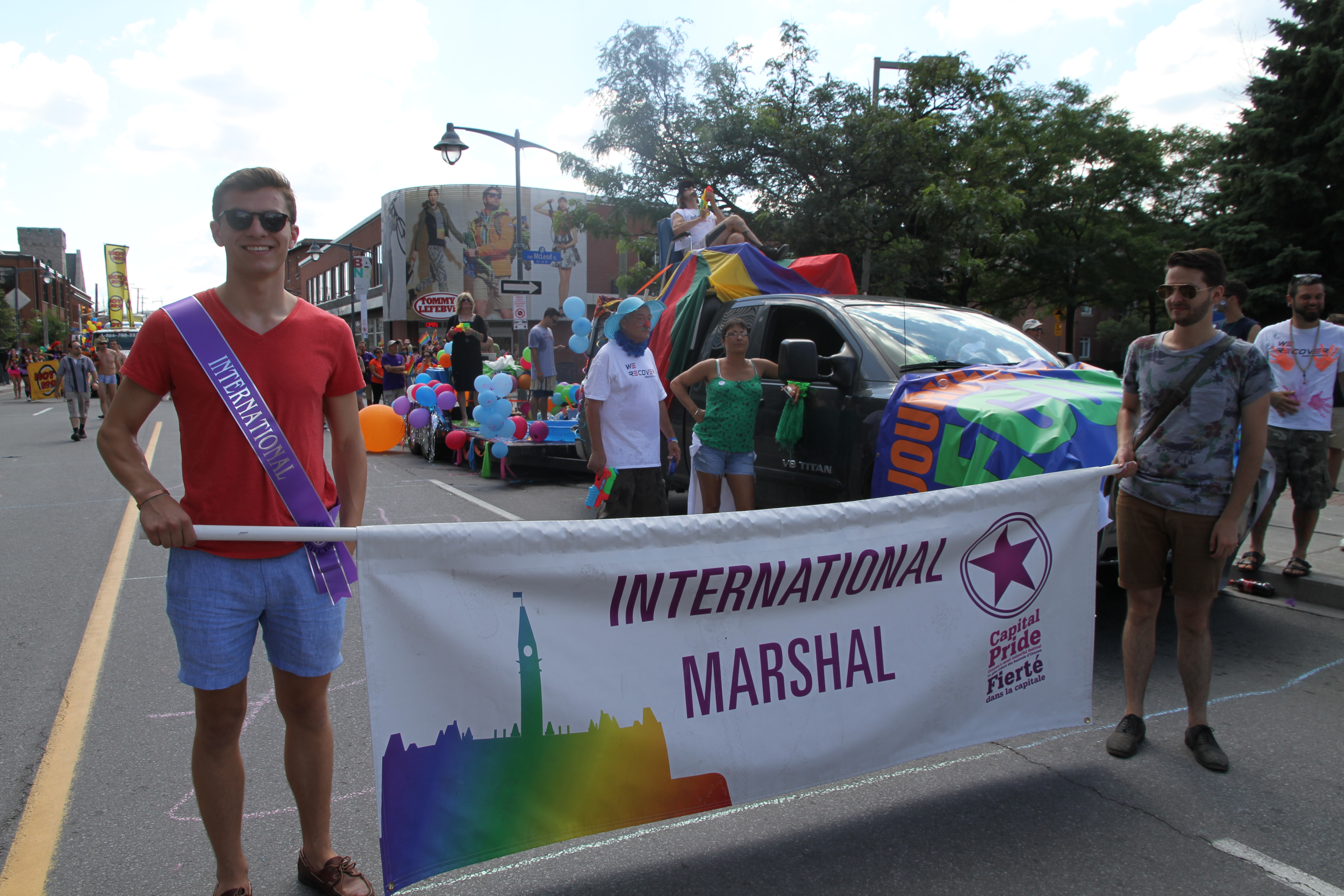
International Marshal Cason Crane participating in the 2014 parade

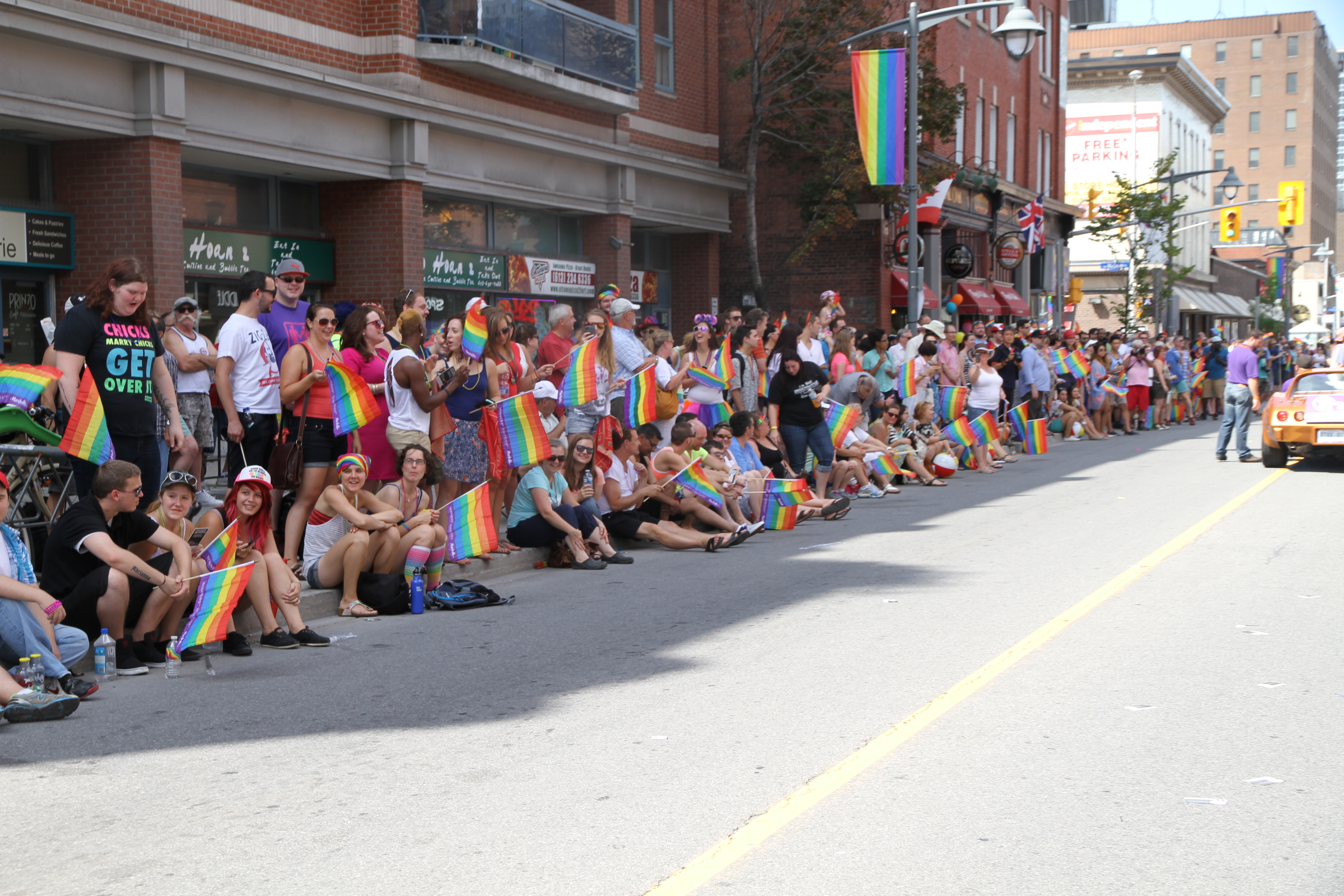
Spectators lining Bank Street during the 2014 parade

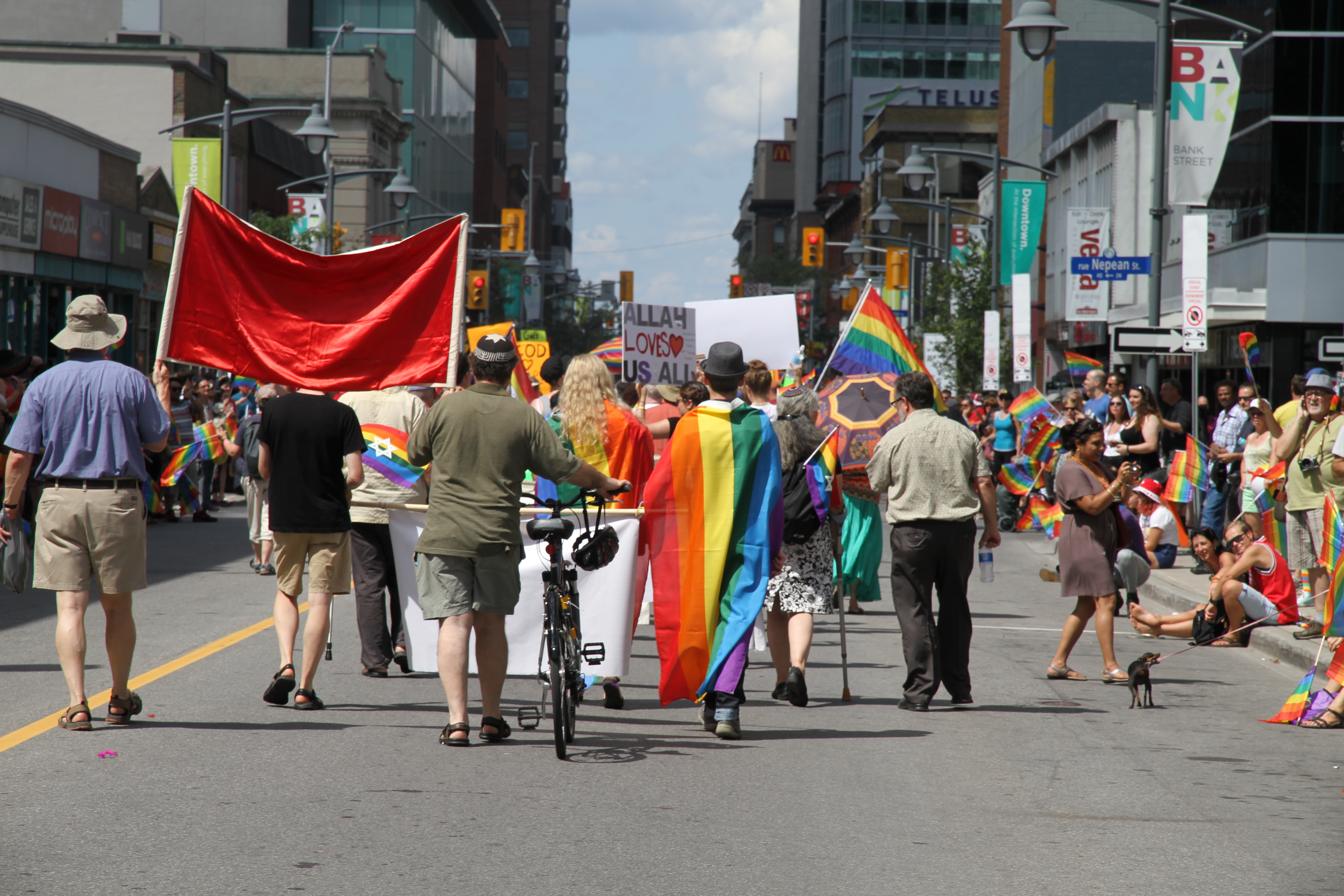
Participants marching down Bank Street in the parade, 2014

== See also ==
- LGBT rights in Canada
- Transgender rights in Canada
- Intersex rights in Canada
- Same-sex marriage in Canada
- Timeline of LGBT history in Canada
