= Ottawa Public Library =

Coordinates: 45°25′12″N 75°41′43″W

Ottawa Public Library Bibliothèque publique d'Ottawa
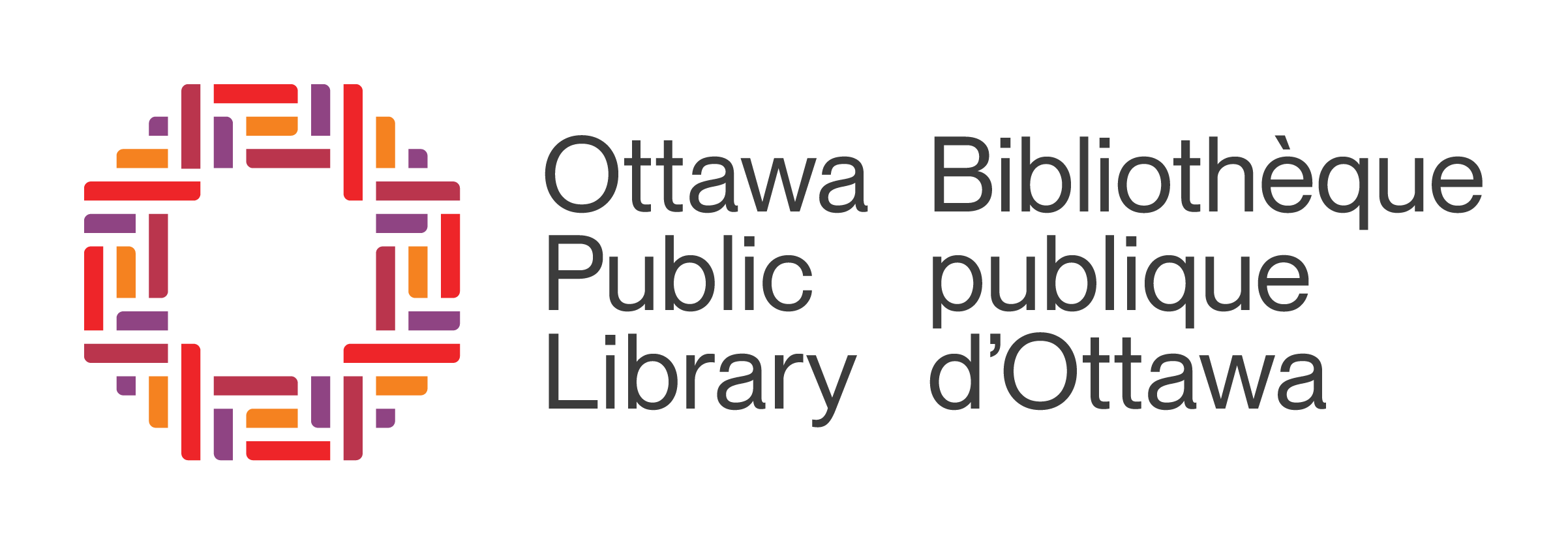

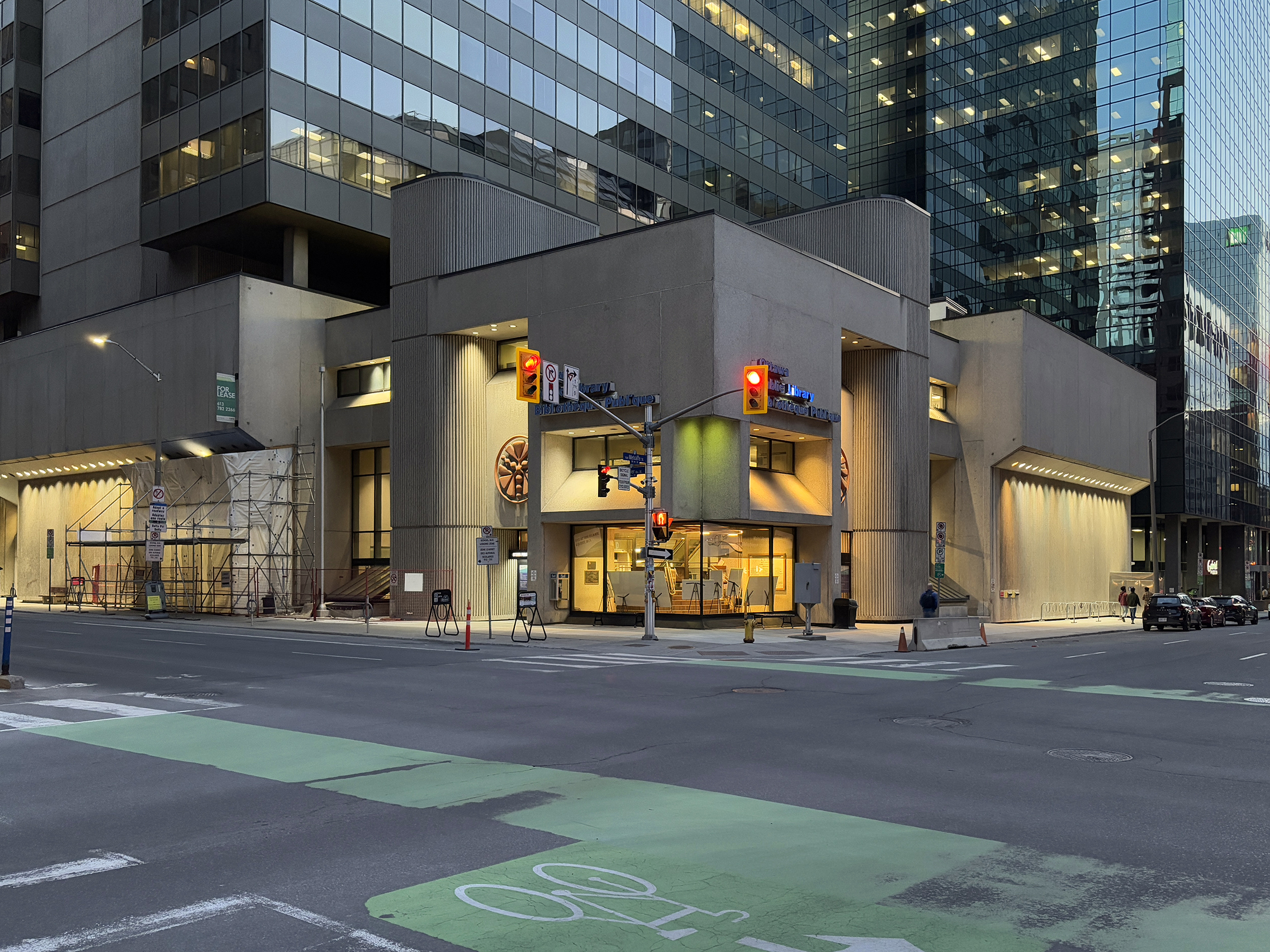
- Main branch of Ottawa Public Library in Downtown Ottawa
- Location: Ottawa, Ontario, Canada
- Type: Public Library system in Ottawa
- Established: 1906
- Branches: 34

Collection
- Items collected: business directories, phone books, maps, government publications, books, periodicals, genealogy, local history
- Size: 2.3 million items

Other information
- Website: about.biblioottawalibrary.ca/en/

The Ottawa Public Library (OPL; French: Bibliothèque publique d'Ottawa) is the library system of Ottawa, Ontario, Canada. The library was founded in 1906 with a donation from the Carnegie Foundation.

== Services ==
- Information and reference services
- Access to full text databases
- Community information
- Reader's advisory services
- Programs for children, youth and adults
- Delivery to homebound individuals
- Interlibrary loan

=== Information technology ===
The library originally provided Windows 95 computers to use with some preloaded applications such as Office 2000 and WordPerfect. In January 2005, it upgraded three branches to Windows XP. The rest received that operating system by April of that year. In March 2014, Windows 7 was rolled out and the software was upgraded to Office 2007, but WordPerfect is now absent. Children accounts are filtered, while adults have the option of choosing unfiltered or filtered Internet access.

Later, they added Wi-Fi hotspots at their branches.

It is also possible to obtain free downloadable e-books, Zinio magazines, audiobooks and MP3 music from the library.

== Origin of the OPL ==
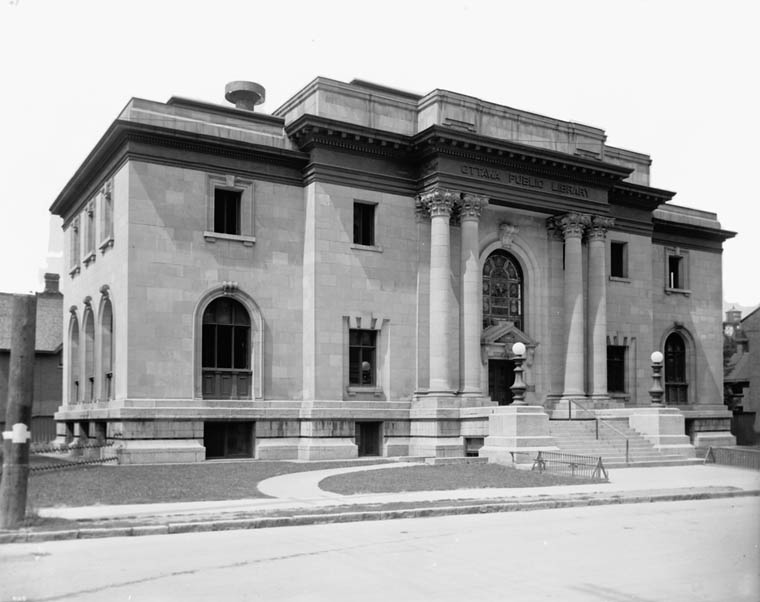
The original Ottawa Public library building, designed by Edgar Lewis Horwood (1903-5)

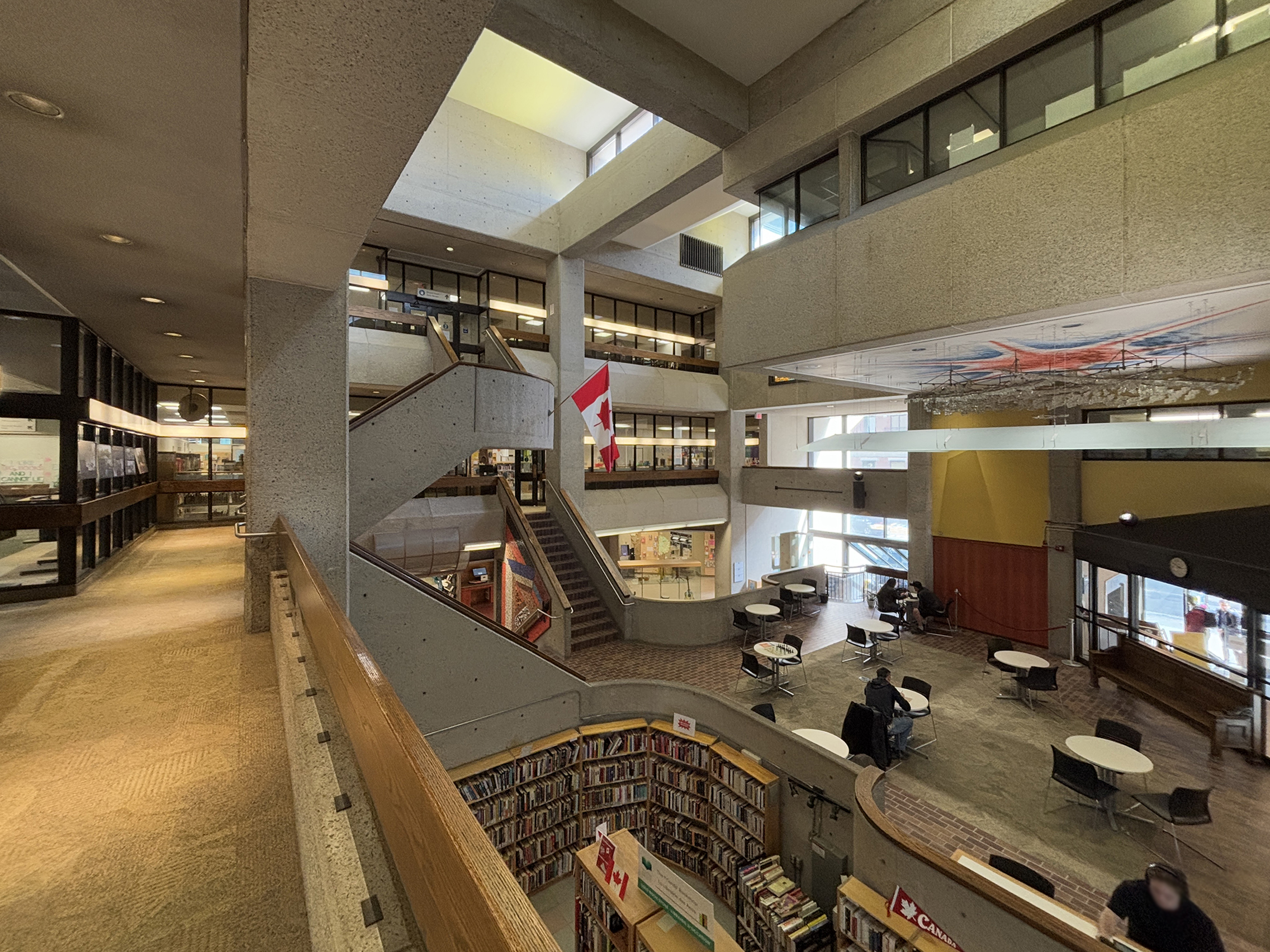
Main branch interior

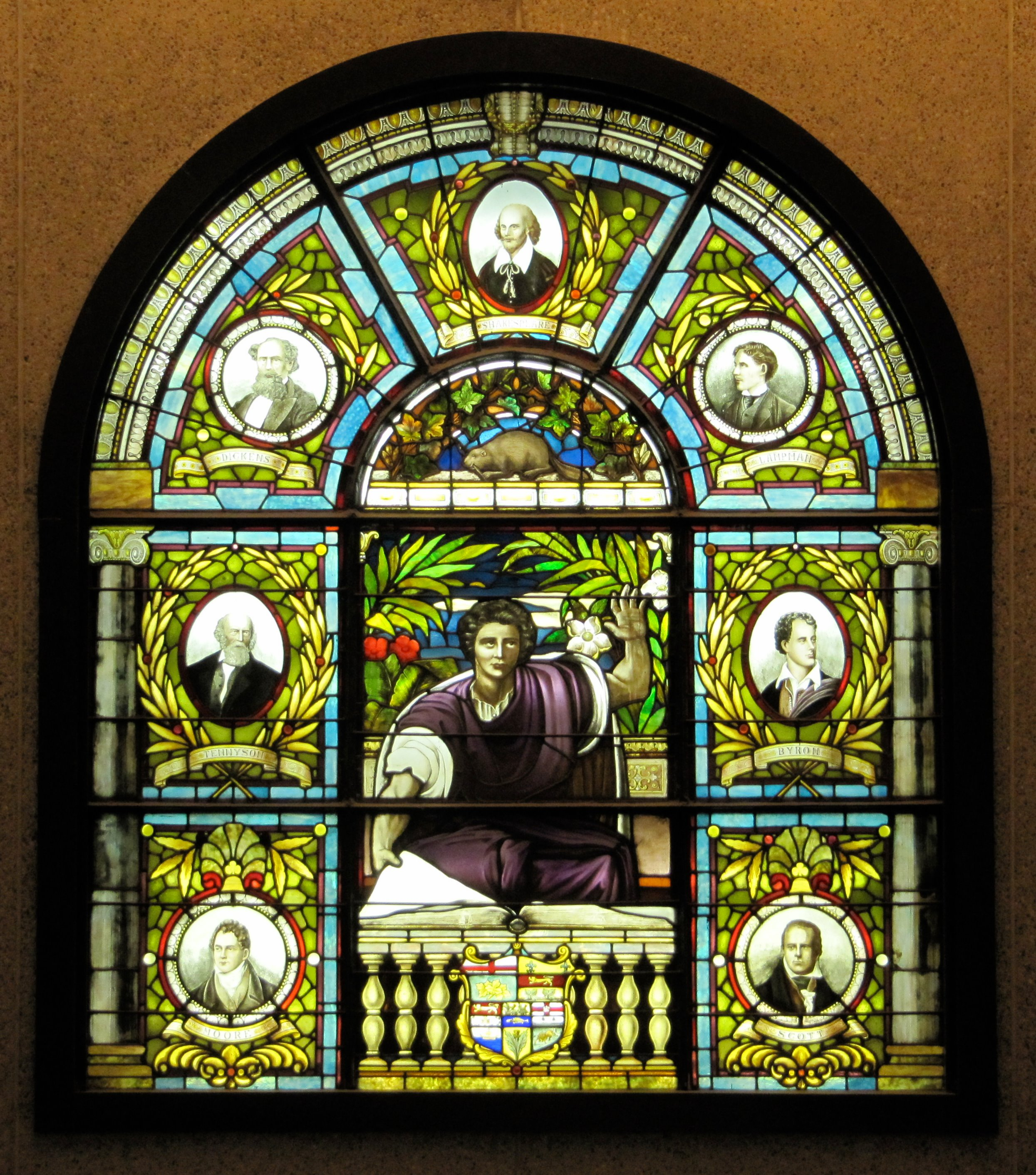
Stained glass at Ottawa Public Library features Charles Dickens, Archibald Lampman, Sir Walter Scott, Lord Byron, Alfred, Lord Tennyson, William Shakespeare and Thomas Moore

Prior to the twentieth century, Ottawa had a few reading rooms in hotel lobbies, and also some small fee-based libraries for working men such as the Bytown Mechanics' Institute, but no truly free place in which anyone could read. The city's active Local Council of Women took up the cause of a free library for all. The first definite step taken for founding a Free Public Library was that of the Ottawa women in the early part of 1895. To attain this end, the Committee obtained the co-operation of the Evening Journal. The proprietor generously placed his paper at the disposal of the ladies for a Woman's Issue. Mary McKay Scott was Managing Editor. The paper was issued April 13, 1895, and a profit of $500.00 realized. To secure municipal assistance, a by-law was submitted in January 1896. The by-law was defeated. They announced, just before the election of 1896, that the mansion of George Perley, a local lumber baron, was donated in his will as a home for the library. However, the city voted down the motion to build a library, as well as another motion to build a firehall; the city just didn't have any money to spare for "luxuries".

Only in 1901, when letters were mailed to Andrew Carnegie. Carnegie replied that he would offer $100,000 to the city to build the library if they provided a site and a pledge of $7,500 a year to maintain it. They eventually agreed in January 1903, and within a few years the library was built and open to the public.

The day after its official opening, in 1906, the original Carnegie library opened several hours later than expected, because the mass of people who had come to the opening day left the entire library in complete disarray, and had walked off with many items.

== Present day OPL ==
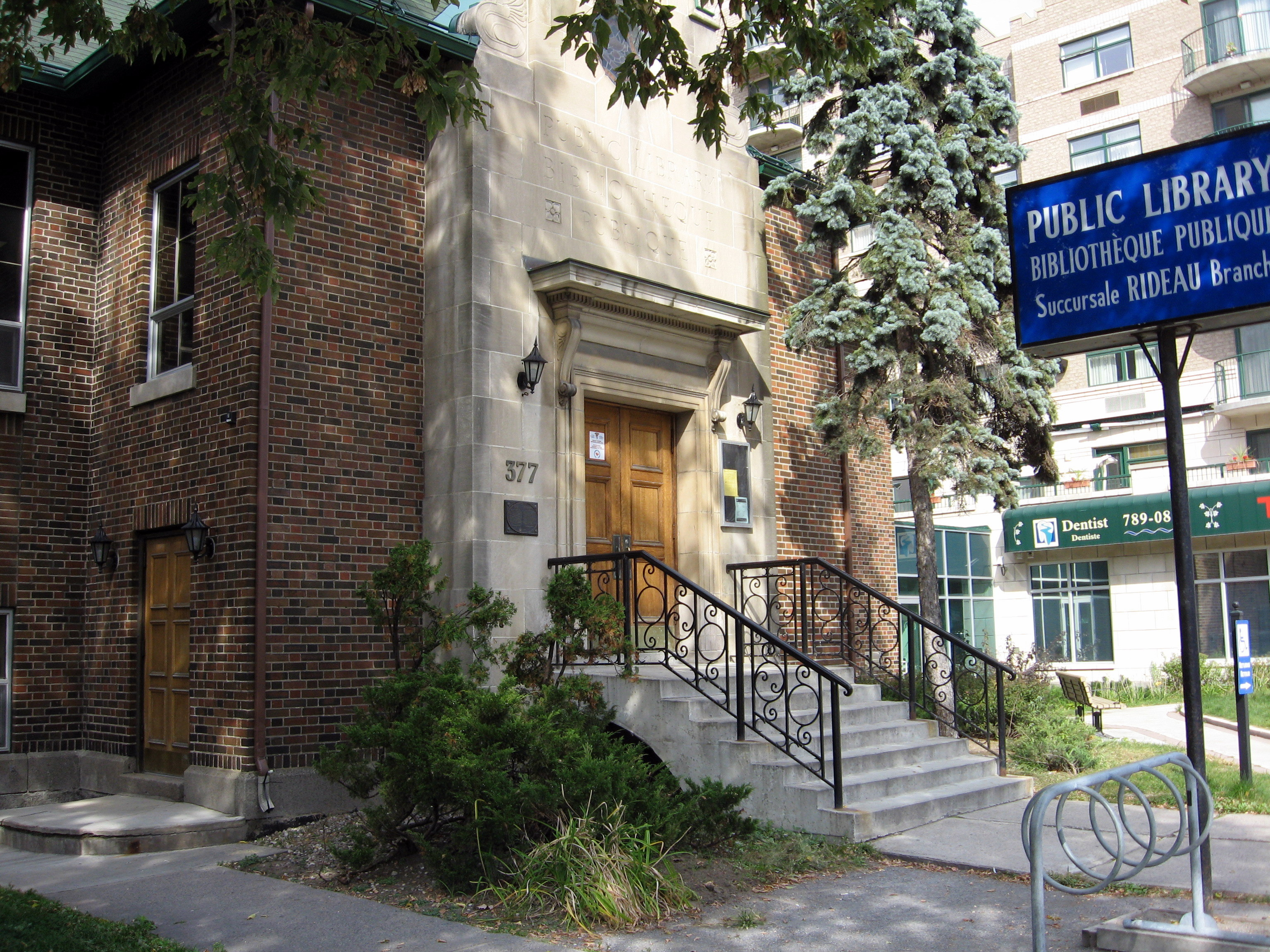
The Rideau branch on Rideau Street

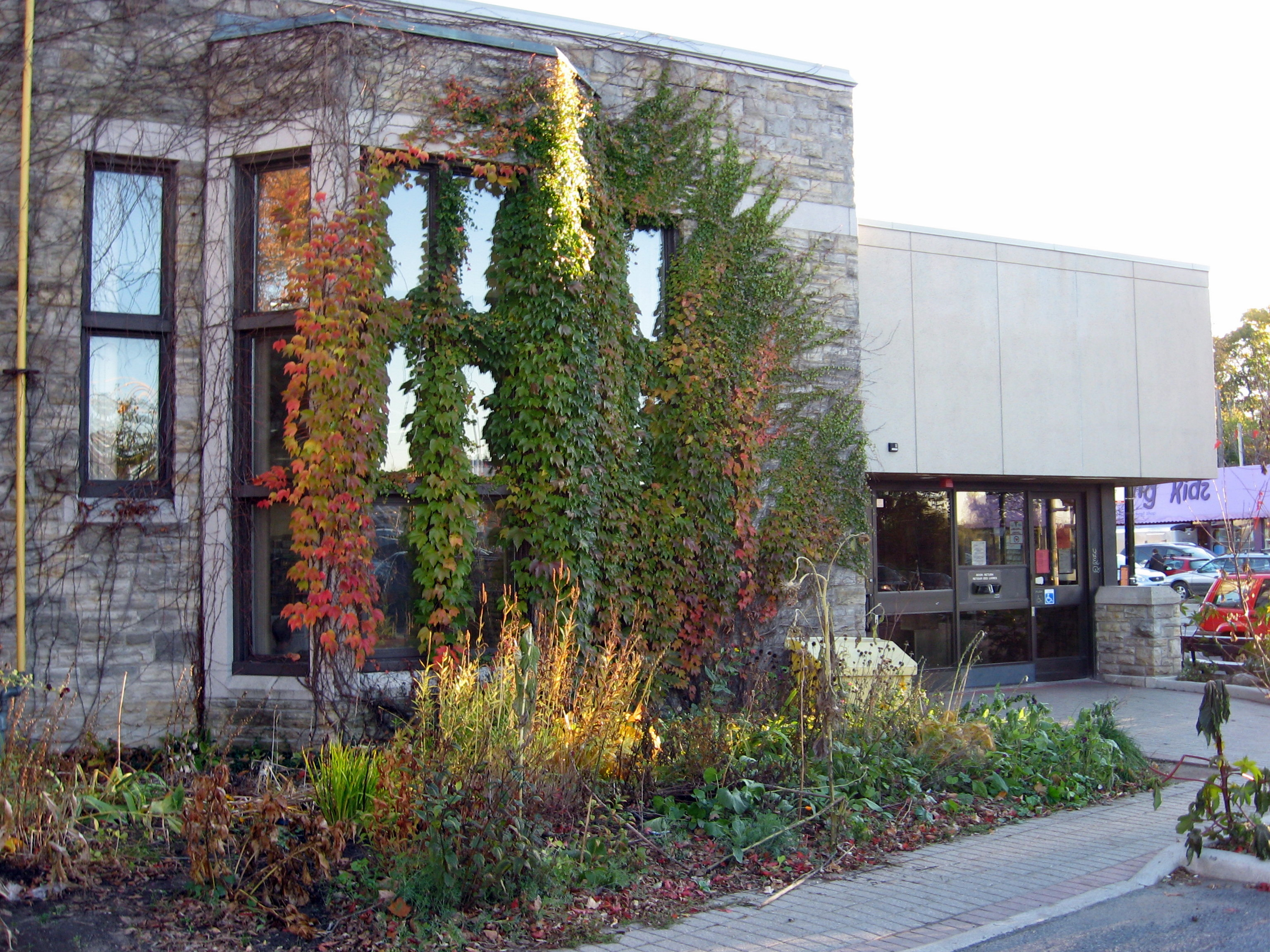
The Sunnyside branch in Old Ottawa South

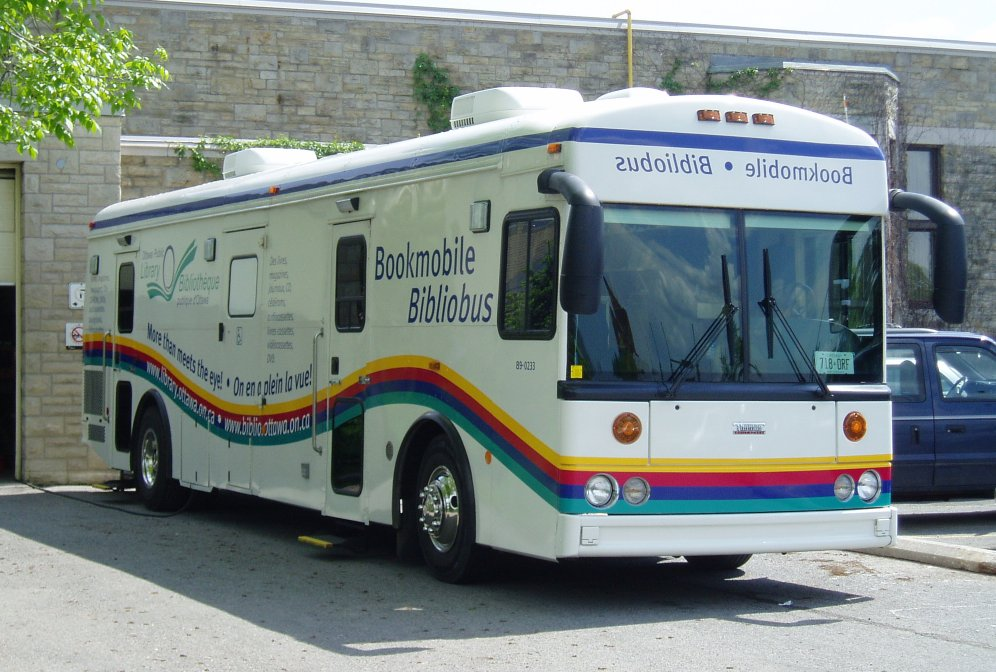
The OPL bookmobile, when it was headquartered at the Sunnyside Branch. It is now headquartered at the Greenboro District Branch, which opened in 2006.

The Main Library is located in Downtown Ottawa at the corner of Metcalfe Street and Laurier Avenue West, at the same spot as the original Carnegie library, although nothing remains of the original building but a stained glass window. Several of the Corinthian columns from the old Carnegie library survive in the Rockeries in Rockcliffe Park, a rock garden maintained by the National Capital Commission. The library now has thirty-three branches spread throughout urban and rural Ottawa.

Before the City of Ottawa's amalgamation in 2001, which resulted in the merging of eleven separate municipal library systems, the Ottawa Public Library itself only had eight libraries, including Sunnyside, Rideau, and Rosemount. Today, the library is divided into district branches Nepean Centrepointe, Cumberland and Greenboro, community branches such as Sunnyside, Ruth E. Dickinson and Carlingwood and several rural branches.

Patrons throughout the new city have greatly benefited from the 2001 merger as they can now easily order almost items from another branch, and return books to any branch in the city. Ordering items via the library website for pickup at a local branch has been very popular, with over 5 million visitors to the website in 2007. The new system is very centralized, which has meant a loss of decision-making power in many ways, including the choice of books for purchase and the old, local ways of running the smaller libraries. Patrons can however suggest items for the library to purchase.

The current CEO of OPL is Sonia Bebbington as of October 31, 2022. The OPL is governed by a board of nine part-time members appointed by the City of Ottawa, five city councillors and four members of the public. The Library is funded mainly by the city through local tax revenues. Some revenue also comes from the province, and traditional library sources of fees, fines, and fundraising.

The library system has 2.3 million items, 91.7% percent of which are books. The library also has a large audio-visual collection including DVDs, CDs, and downloadable books and music. Since Ottawa has a significant francophone population, a large portion of the collection is in French, with some branches such as Vanier working almost exclusively in French. Smaller collections offer a wide array of other languages, notably Chinese, Hindi, and Arabic. According to the latest Ontario library statistics, only the Toronto Public Library has larger holdings. The library hosts a full range of programming for both adults and children, with children's programming being extremely popular. There are also 359 public internet stations and 79 electronic databases.

The Library's two bookmobiles, which operated out of the Sunnyside branch for almost 50 years, stop at regularly scheduled places throughout the city in an effort to reach areas without library branches. Many of these neighborhoods are poorer, more remote, or simply too far from a branch. During a funding crisis in 2004, the older bookmobile was nearly decommissioned, but it was kept in service with a second, new bookmobile added in 2005. The Bookmobile headquarters was moved to the new Greenboro District Library in June 2006.

The large new Greenboro District Library, built in the city's rapidly growing South end, opened on June 7, 2006, replacing the Blossom Park Branch established by the former City of Gloucester.

== New central library ==
In recent years, numerous cities such as Vancouver, Seattle and Salt Lake City, have had great success in constructing new central libraries as part of downtown revitalization efforts. These urban landmarks have created new civic spaces that both create community and are key component of an information society. Accordingly, there is pressure for Ottawa to have a great design and follow other Canadian cities such as Calgary and Halifax, who have erected new libraries in recent years. There was an offer to the City Council from a developer for a partnership to build in the still-mostly-empty Lebreton Flats. The OPL-LAC Joint Facility (Ottawa Public Library and Library and Archives of Canada) will be located at 555 Albert Street at the edge of LeBreton Flats; it will be named Ādisōke ("storytelling" in Anishinābemowin Algonquin) and is expected to open in 2026.

== City of Ottawa Central Archives and Ottawa Public Library Materials Centre ==
The City of Ottawa Central Archives and Ottawa Public Library Materials Centre is located at 100 Tallwood Dr. The Leadership in Energy and Environmental Design (LEED) building was designed by Shoalts and Zaback Architects, and Barry J. Hobin and Associates Architects. The building features a variety of energy-saving technologies and renewable resources. The Archives includes a public reference room, exhibition gallery, conservation laboratory, and art vaults. The Library Materials Centre, features an Automated Materials Handling System, which helps sort and deliver the library materials to all 33 branches and the Bookmobile. The central archives and library materiels center was included amongst other architecturally interesting and historically significant buildings in Doors Open Ottawa, held June 2 and 3, 2012.

== See also ==
- Ask Ontario
- Bytown Mechanics' Institute
- Ottawa Trans Library
- List of Carnegie libraries in Canada
- List of public libraries in Ontario
- List of national and state libraries
