= Rugby union in Israel =

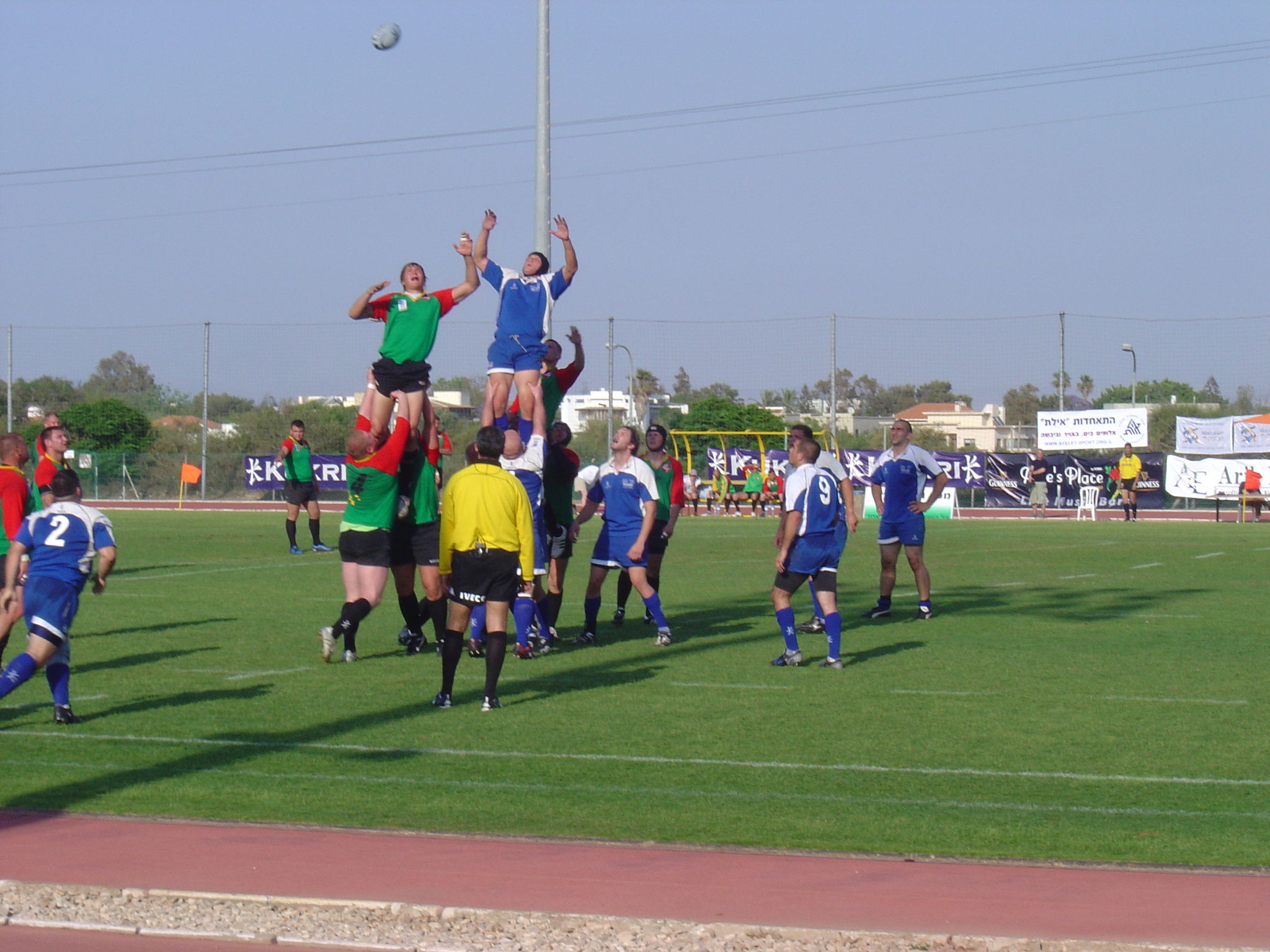
- Lithuania playing Israel
- Country: Israel
- Governing body: Rugby Israel
- National team: Israel
- First played: 1920s, 1930s
- Registered players: 1400
- Clubs: 10 (formally organised)

National competitions
- Rugby World Cup; Rugby World Cup Sevens; IRB Sevens World Series; European Nations Cup

Rugby union in Israel was brought to the country by British soldiers during the British Mandate for Palestine. Rugby Israel was founded as the Israel Rugby Union in 1975, and joined the IRB in 1988. For political reasons it is also part of FIRA-AER, the European rugby body, rather than the Asian Rugby Football Union.

== History ==
Rugby union was brought to the country by British soldiers during the Mandate era. Around the same time, there was an influx of Jews from various parts of the British Commonwealth and the Francophonie who tried to establish the game. In the 1950s, Leo Camron, a former player for Natal, organised teams amongst the various immigrants, and within the IDF.

Post-War rugby found a new advocate in South African Leo Camron. A graduate of Natal University, Camron was a former artillery captain of the South African Army who had served in the North African campaigns of WWII, and went to Palestine to join Machal and fight in the 1947–1949 Palestine war. In South Africa, Camron had also played for the Natal rugby team. In 1951, succeeded in obtaining an appointment in the sports department of the IDF.

In 1952, Camron organised independent Israel's first rugby match, between a group of South Africans, and a team of parachutists in the IDF. The South Africans won 18–6. The match ball was somewhat unusual, being a shoe wrapped in a towel. The game proved fairly popular in the IDF, thanks partly to its emphasis on aggression and team tactics. Camron soon organised other games, mainly between soldiers, and immigrants from the British Commonwealth. Camron made an attempt to get the IDF to adopt the game, but was unsuccessful due to institutional bureaucracy. This was a bitter blow to his campaign, and led to him taking a more passive role in Israeli rugby, until his death in 2007.

Israeli rugby went into decline during the 1960s, until in the 1970s, a new wave of immigrants from rugby playing countries arrived, particularly from South Africa. A major focus for the Israeli game was the Kibbutz Yizre'el (Hebrew: יִזְרְעֶאל) near Afula in the north west of the country, which had a number of South Africans living in it. It also garnered an interest in areas with large English-speaking populations such as Ra'anana (Hebrew: רַעֲנָנָה) in west Central Israel and Jerusalem.

A national league was set up in 1972, and the Israel Rugby Union (now Rugby Israel) formed in 1975.

== Maccabiah Games and Internationals ==
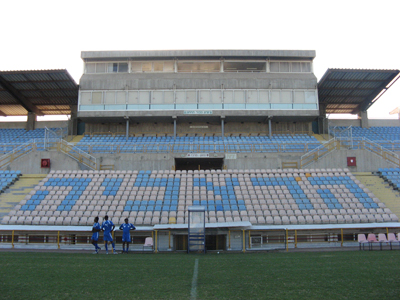
Herzliya Municipal Stadium which is used to host international rugby, particularly during the Maccabiah Games

Israel's first international match was away to Switzerland on 25 May 1981, and ended 9–9. Israel rugby in this period countered its isolation, by building up contacts with British military teams based in Cyprus, and teams and organisations based in South Africa and France.

The game was given a further shot in the arm when it was included in the four-yearly Maccabiah Games in 1981 - the so-called "Jewish Olympics" - in 1993, it was won by a South African national Jewish side.

The high point of Israeli rugby has been seen as their shock 67–8 win against Hungary in the World Cup Qualifiers, which did much to promote the sport within Israel.

In 1989, Chris Thau claims that Israel had eight clubs (a figure which has remained fairly steady), and around 400 players (a number which has increased somewhat).

Israel has also entered the Rugby World Cup Sevens.

Roughly 70% of Israeli players are now locally born.

== National team ==
The national team is in the third tier of international rugby. Their first match was away to Switzerland on 25 May 1981, and ended 9–9. They participated in the European section of the qualifying rounds for the 1991 Rugby World Cup. In a group with Denmark, Sweden and Switzerland. Israel lost all three matches.

In the qualifying matches for the 1995 World Cup, Israel beat Hungary 67–8 in the preliminary round, before being knocked out in the Round 1 group stage, failing to score a point in two of their three games.

The qualifying matches for the 1999 Rugby World Cup followed the established pattern, with Israel being knocked out in the group stage, though they avoided finishing bottom of their five-team group by beating Austria. The same happened in the 2003 WC qualifiers, where they finished fourth in a six team group. In the 2007 WC qualifiers they did not even make it to the group stage, being beaten 113–7 on aggregate by Lithuania. In April 2007, they were ranked 93rd out of 95 IRB member nations.

Their home ground is at Wingate Institute.

== Domestic rugby ==
Rugby is most popular amongst English speaking immigrants, particularly those from South Africa, Australia, and the UK, and a lesser extent New Zealand and North America. There are also players from other parts of the world, particularly France, Italy, Georgia and other parts of Europe where the game is popular.

Rugby has a low take up rate amongst the Arab Israeli population, and Mizrachi, although some originate in countries such as Morocco and Tunisia with a significant rugby tradition.

There is at least one Druze player and some Christians (particularly in Jerusalem), but the game does not appear to be popular amongst Muslims.

With the exception of Beit Jala Lions, based in Bethlehem, there is little rugby to speak of in the West Bank or Gaza, and contact with neighbouring Arab communities is low. The first league was set up in 1972 with five clubs, and was played over the 1972/3 season. Initially the league was run by the players themselves, but in a general meeting in 1975, it was decided to set up a committee to run the game.

Since then the league has fluctuated between six and ten teams, with six members at the start of the 2006/7 season:

Team	City	Home field	Year Accepted into League
ASA "Yaron" Tel Aviv Rugby Club	Tel Aviv	(temporary) Wingate Rugby Fields	?
Ashkelon RC	Ashkelon	?	?
Haifa Wild Boars	Haifa	?	?
Jerusalem Lions RFC	Jerusalem	?	?
Ra'anana Roosters (formerly Netanya Roosters)	Ra'anana	?	?
Yizrael	Kibbutz Yizrael	?	?
Maghar Rugby Club	Maghar	?	?

There are four women's teams;

- Haifa Technion
- Ra'anana Roosters
- Tel Aviv
- Jerusalem Women's Rugby Club

=== Former clubs ===
Team	City	Home field	Year Accepted into League
Be'er Sheva Camels (Cup winners 2004/5)	Beersheba	?	?
Eilat Jackhammers (Cup winners 2002/3)	Eilat	?	?
Karmiel Crusaders	Karmiel	?	?
Sporting Metropole	Netanya	?	?
Galil HaElyon (גליל עליון)	Upper Galilee	Kfar Blum	?

Golan gorillas

- Haogen-Nir Eliyahu
- Emek Hefer

There is also a Golden Oldies club called the Elders of Zion.

== Women's rugby ==
Although Israel's women have not yet played test match rugby, they have been playing international sevens rugby since 2005. (Current playing record).

== See also ==
- Sports in Israel
- Jamie Heaslip
- Anglo-Israelis
