= Boaron =

Boaron is a surname of Italian origin. Notable people with the surname include:

- Ilan Boaron (born 1972), Israeli footballer
- Yehuda Boaron (born 1965), Israeli footballer
