= Haifa Wild Boars =

Wild Boars
- Union: Rugby Israel
- Nickname(s): Wild Boars
- President: Menahem Ben Menahem
- Coach(es): Yuri Vengerov
- Captain(s): Shahar Caufman
Team kit	Change kit

Maccabi Haifa Wild Boars (previously known simply as Haifa Rugby or Wild Boars) is one of the eight clubs affiliated to Rugby Israel. Based in Haifa, in the northern part of Israel.

The team is part of Maccabi Haifa.

== Club history ==
The club was formed by Alan Brazg, a student in the Technion, in the year 1971 and consisted mostly of immigrants from South Africa. The club was one of the first to bring rugby union to Israel, when the Israeli union was formed in 1972.

The team was ranked 3rd in the Israeli League season 2022-2023.

Season	Position
2021/2022	7/8
2022/2023	3/8
2023/2024	Tournament cancelled due to war

== Maccabi Haifa Women's Rugby ==
Erez Weiss, a Haifa men’s player, promoted the birth of a women's rugby union team. With his enthusiasm, a team was formed in 2005 which included 7 team members and was coached by Menachem Ben Menachem and Nir Bar Or (2005/2006). Then, Yael Kenan took over as coach (2006/2007). Shaharit Golding was the most recent coach of the team (during the season 2018/2019).

Haifa women's team, also known as Maccabi Haifa Women's Rugby, won the Yizrael 7's tournament in 2007 and came in first place in the rugby tournament of Eilat games 2009. The team was in the top of the Israeli Rugby Union league, being ranked second 4 season in a row in the late 2000's.

== Playing Grounds ==
Maccabi Haifa Wild Boars' Home pitch is the Curly Krieger Stadium in Neve Sha'anan, Haifa.

== Current squad ==
Player	Position	Nationality	Comments
Mario Del Mastro	Prop/Hooker	Italy	
Asaf Elad	Prop	Israel	Co-scrum coach
Ido Ashkenazy	Prop	Israel	
Elad Alush	Prop	Israel	
Antoine Vinciguerra	Hooker/Flanker	Corsica France	Co-scrum coach
Ziv Melling	Hooker/Flanker	Israel	Internationally capped player for Israel
Mohamed Barkeh	Hooker/Flanker	Israel	
Robert Hanhan	Lock/Prop	Israel	
Shahar Caufman	Lock	Israel	Captain
Daniel Goldberg	Lock/Flanker/Prop/Number 8/Center	Israel France Spain Mexico Venezuela Canada	Internationally capped player for Israel and co-scrum coach
Boaz Ben Menachem	Flanker/Prop	Israel	
Omri Afek	Flanker/Center/Number 8	Israel	
Barkev Barelian	Flanker	Israel Armenia	
Ori Wohl	Flanker	Israel	
Nitai Gor	Number 8	Israel	
Baheej Bathish	Flanker	Israel Armenia	
Yura Vengerov	Number Eight	Russia	Coach/Former Russian national team player
Jacques Cohen	Swiss Knife	France Israel	
Egor Egorov	Scrum Half/Fly Half	Russia	Strength and Conditioning Coach
Ron Bartal	Scrum Half/Fly Half	Israel	
Ofir Haytman	Scrum Half	Israel	
Yoav Golan	Scrum Half	Israel	
Nemani Buliruarua	Fly Half	Fiji	Center Tel Aviv Heat
Yochanan Reis	Fly Half	Israel	
Eduard Gladkov	Full Back/Fly Half/Center	Israel Russia	
Sailasa Turagaluvu	Center	Fiji	Lock Tel Aviv Heat
Zacharia Kornbluth	Center	Israel USA	
Or Beyar	Center/Winger	Israel	
Gaston Leibovich	Center	Israel Mexico	
Oded Kasan	Center	Israel	
Zaza Mgrebishvili	Winger	Georgia Israel	
Rotem Ben Eliezer	Winger	Israel	
Dmitry Kotov	Winger/Full Back	Kazakhstan Israel	
Nimrod Ben Menachem	Full Back	Israel	

== Team Legends ==
Name	Nationality	Role
Menachem Ben Menachem	Israel	Former Player, President of the club. Former President of the Israel Rugby Union
Ziv Melling	Israel	Player for more than 20 years. National Team caped player
Golan Van Meteren	Israel	Former player in the team who faced more problems with referees than with other league players. Responsible of the rugby initiation course in the Technion.
Gilbert Cohen	Israel/France	Former player of the Wild Boars team. Now one of the official referees of the Israeli Rugby Union.
