= Railway Park =

Linear park in Tel Aviv

Coordinates: 32.0607°N 34.7674°E

- פארק המסילה
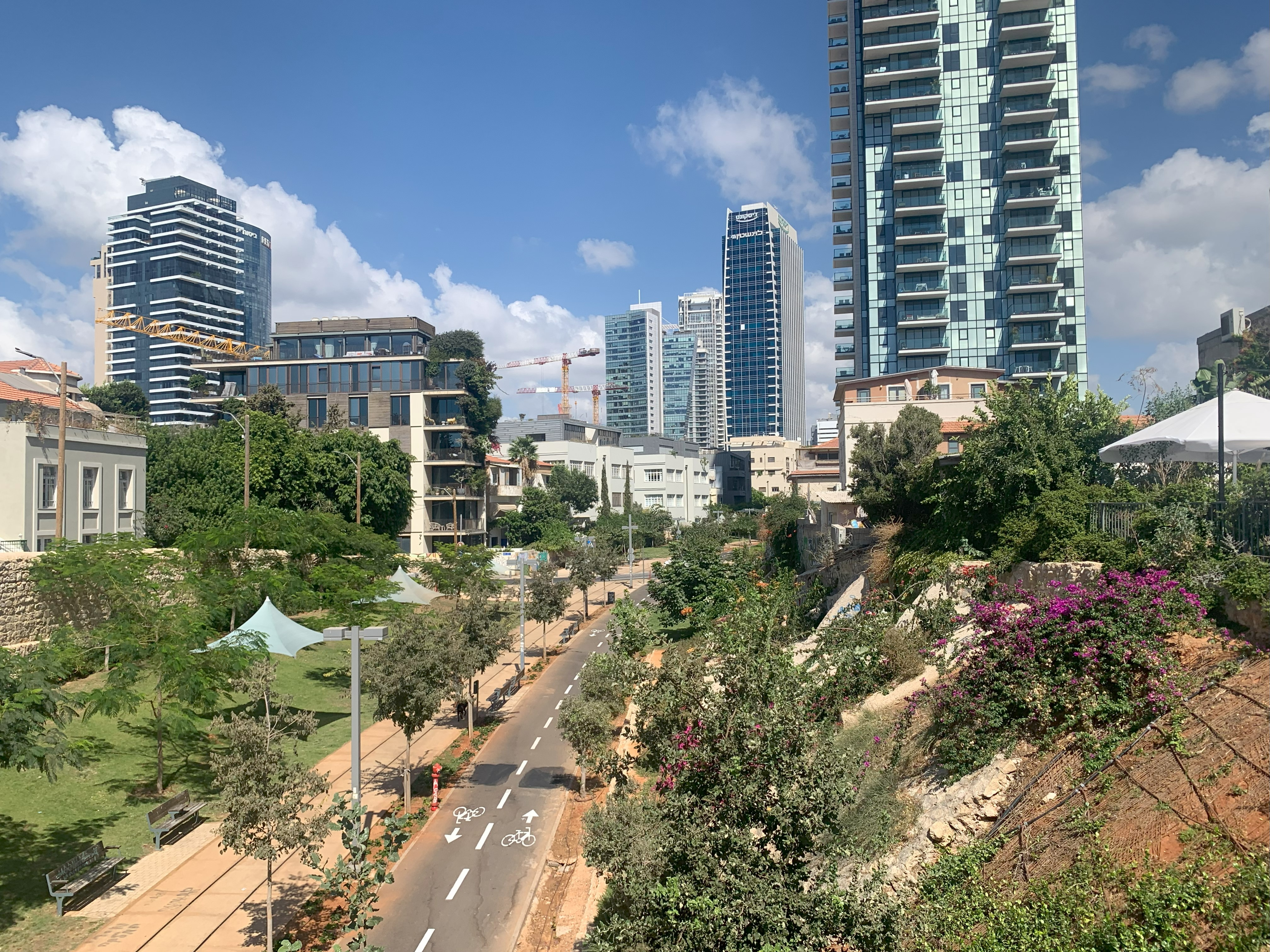
- Interactive map of Railway Park
- Type: Linear park
- Location: Neve Tzedek, southern Tel Aviv, Israel
- Area: 26 dunam
- Opened: 2022
- Designer: Dan Fox, Kolker-Kolker-Epstein, Mandel architects
- Public transit: Light Rail, Red Line

Railway Park (Hebrew: פארק המסילה, Park HaMesila) is a linear public park in the neighborhood of Neve Tzedek in southern Tel Aviv, Israel. The park is on the route of the Ottoman railway between Nahalat Binyamin Street in the east and the station complex and Kaufman Street in the west. The park was partially opened to the public in October 2020.

== On the park ==
In the park is situated the Elifelet station on the Tel Aviv's light rail Red Line, and near its eastern end is Allenby station. Between these stations, the light rail runs below ground level, and therefore most of the park is actually the ceiling of one of the line's tunnels and the Herzl Shaft, which was used to dig the railway line's tunnels.

The park is approximately 1.3 km long and covers an area of approximately 26 dunams. It includes a bicycle path, a pedestrian path, trees, and vegetation. In addition, it preserves historical buildings and elements from the railway route, such as the Shloush Bridge, which was dismantled and restored as part of the light rail work, a structure to support the sides of the gorge, and the "slippery slope" – a steep dirt slope between the Nehushtan Bridge and the Shloush Bridge. During October 2022, the remaining sections of the park were opened to the public, thus completing the opening of the entire park after two years in which only part of it was open.

== Planning and development ==
The park's planning was led by the architectural firm Kolker-Kolker-Epstein, which also designed the Elifelet station. The landscape architecture was done Dan Fox. Mandel Architects firm was responsible for the conservation work along the park, which included the dismantling and restoration of the Chleouche Bridge, the preservation of the moat walls, the retaining walls and the slipway, and the restored embedment of the old railway track along the park's paths.

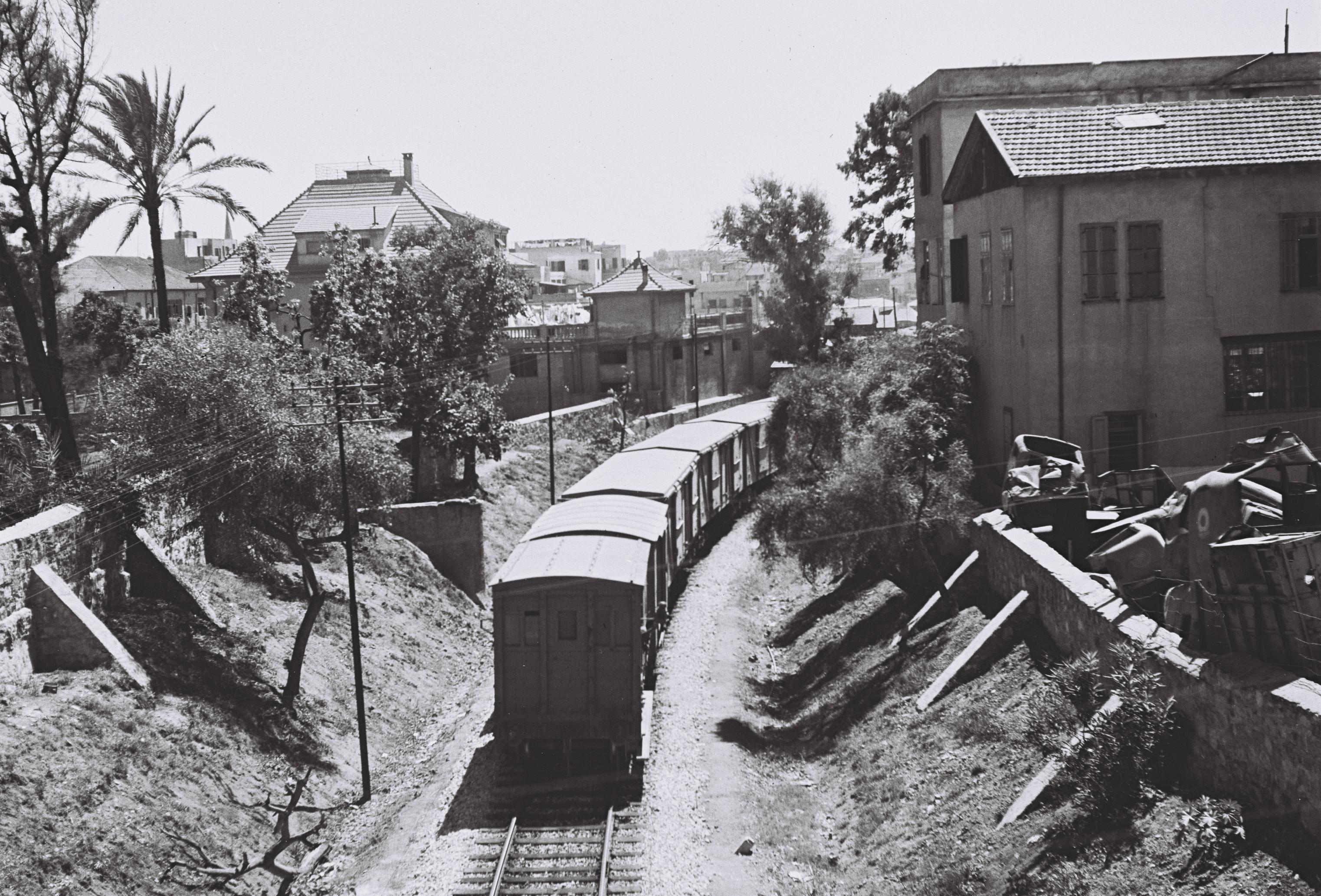
A train passing through the former railway, 1946

The development of the park was carried out and financed by NTA - Urban Transportation Networks as part of the city's light rail works.

== See also ==
- Yarkon Park
- Train Track Park (Jerusalem)
