= ASA Tel Aviv Rugby Club =

ASA "Yaron" Tel Aviv Rugby Club
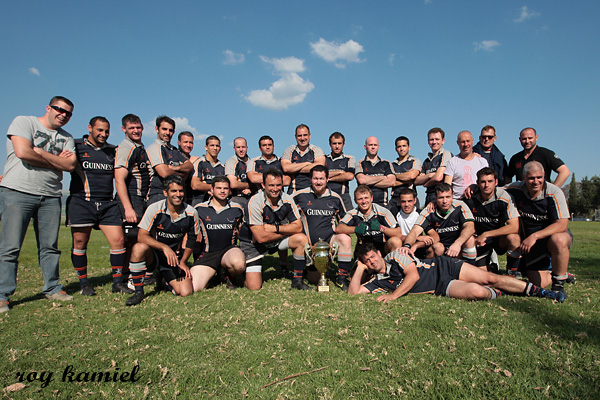
- Founded: 1973; 53 years ago
- Location: Tel Aviv
- Ground: (temporary) Wingate Institute Rugby Fields
- Chairman: Arik Gail
- President: Elisha Rubin
- Director of Rugby: Oren Alt
- Coach(es): Raanan Penn and Mark Goldin
- Captain: Isaac Hirsch
- Most caps: Oren Alt (49)
- League: Israeli rugby union league
- 2020-21: 2nd
1st kit	2nd kit

Official website
- www.telaviv.rugby

ASA "Yaron" Tel Aviv (Hebrew: אס"א "ירון" תל אביב), is an amateur rugby club founded in 1973 and based in Tel Aviv, Israel.

== History ==
The team was founded in 1973, and is a member team of the multi-sport club, the Academic Sports Association (ASA), founded in 1953, and Rugby Israel.

ASA plays home matches at the Sportek sports centre in Yarkon Park.

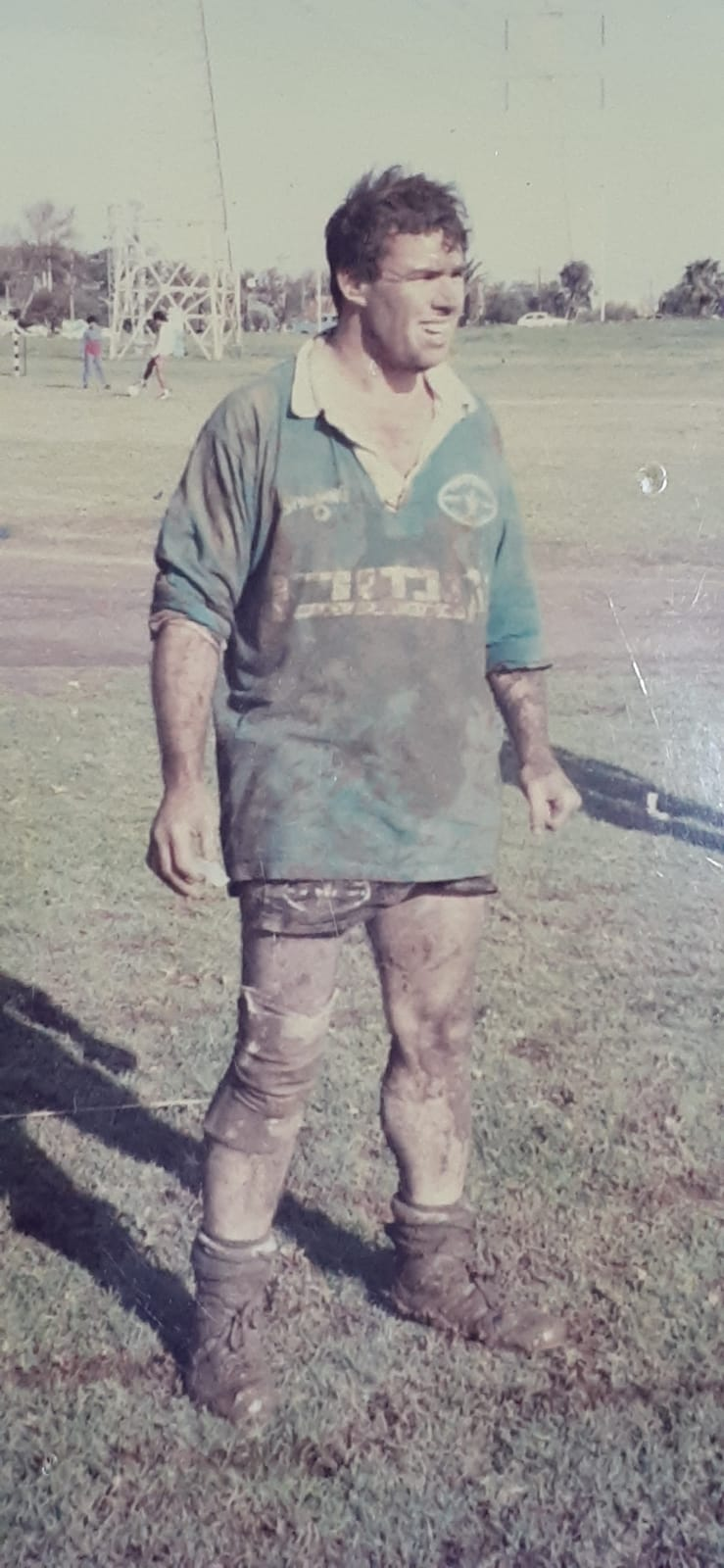
Yaron Drori, 1970's

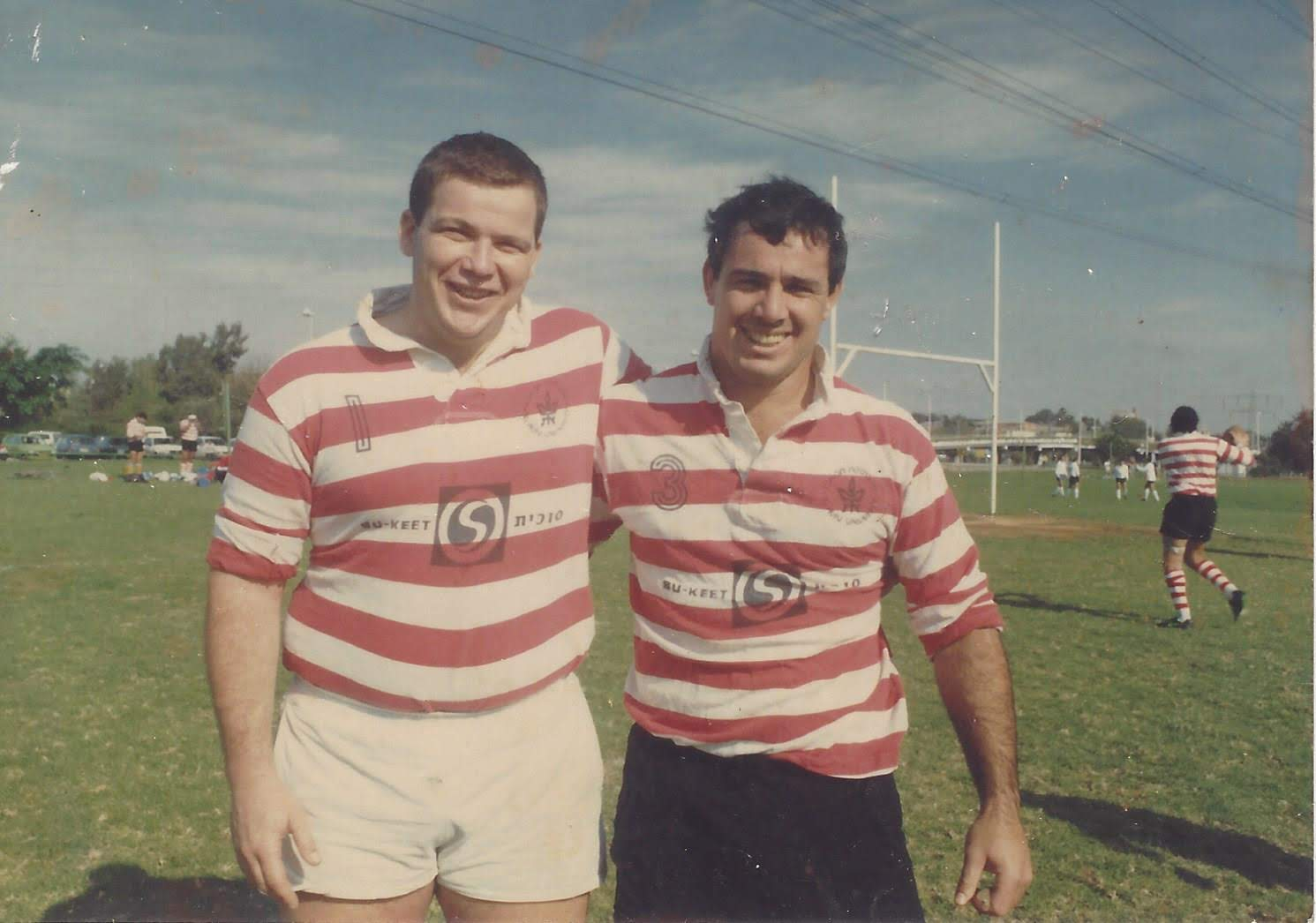
Yaron Drori in shirt #3

ASA "Yaron" Tel Aviv won the league title 14 times since. In 1974–75, 1977–78, 1990–1991, 1994–95, 1996–97, 1999–00, 2000–01, 2003–04, 2009–10, 2013–14, 2014–15, 2018-19 In 2009-10 the club also won the cup, and were undefeated all season. Club coach Ra'anan Penn assisted by Mark Goldin.

=== Name Change/Dedication ===
In 2020 the club officially added Yaron to its name in honor of the late Yaron Drori who was the captain of the team for about 20 years.

== Honours ==
- Israeli Rugby Union Championship
  - 2010
- Israeli Rugby Union Cup
  - 2010

== Associated teams ==
Two amateur teams share membership and administrative infrastructure with ASA Tel Aviv RC.

=== Tel Aviv Amazons ===
The Tel Aviv Amazons is a women's team which has won multiple championships. The team is based at the Tel Aviv University sports complex.

=== Tel Aviv Ibex RFC ===
Tel Aviv Ibex RFC is a gay and inclusive team, the first in the Middle East. The team is a member of International Gay Rugby (IGR).
