= Yarkon Park =

Public park in Tel Aviv, Israel

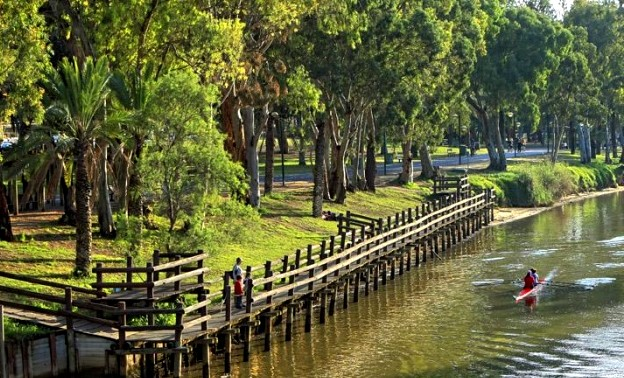
- Interactive map of Yarkon Park
- Type: Urban park
- Location: Tel Aviv, Israel
- Coordinates: 32°06′00″N 34°48′36″E
- Area: 3.5 km²
- Established: 1951, Opened 1973
- Operator: Tel Aviv municipality
- Visitors: 16 million
- Status: Open all year

Yarkon Park (Hebrew: פארק הירקון, Park HaYarkon; officially named Ganei Yehoshua, Hebrew: גני יהושע, lit. 'Yehoshua's Gardens') is a park in Tel Aviv, Israel, with about sixteen million visits annually. Named after the Yarkon River, which flows through it, the park includes extensive lawns, sports facilities, botanical gardens, an aviary, a water park, two outdoor concert venues and lakes. The park covers an area of 3.5 km². At 375 hectares, it is slightly larger than Central Park in New York and double the size of Hyde Park in London.

== History ==
In 1925, the municipality of Tel Aviv invited urban planner Patrick Geddes to prepare an expansion of the city towards the Yarkon, which was considered the city's natural border. Palestinian Arab and Jewish farmers grew vegetables and maintained orchards on the banks of the river, and Geddes suggested a park should be established on the Yarkon's southern bank. Planting of trees began in the early 1940s, starting on the river's southern bank and expanding eastward with the city, though at that time, without a comprehensive plan. This was implemented for the benefit of the city's inhabitants, predominantly Olim from Europe who were unaccustomed to the region's climate, and with the goal of establishing Jewish ownership, European imagery, and a callback to a biblical landscape likely more verdant than that of the region in the 20th century.

1948 brought about unprecedented change to the region. The mass displacement of Palestinians, along with urban overcrowding caused by the arrival of one million Jews from Europe and the Middle East presented Prime Minister Ben Gurion with an opportunity to establish new parks. In 1950, the government of Israel established 175 hectares on the northern bank of the Yarkon, for the purpose of establishing a park, and a planting project then began on the Yarkon's northern bank. This northern area had been within the village lands of Al-Shaykh Muwannis; today the park also covers parts of the village lands of Jarisha, Al-Mas'udiyya and Al-Jammasin al-Gharbi.

In 1959, the Mapai (Labor Party) came into power in Tel Aviv. They were already in power on the national level. This union of local and national government allowed the inception of various large scale projects in Tel-Aviv. In 1961, damage to the Yarkon's banks lead the municipality to initiate development of a comprehensive plan for Yarkon Park. When it was opened to the public in 1973, it was called Ganei Yehoshua, honoring Yehoshua Rabinovich, the mayor of Tel Aviv between 1969 and 1974.

== Landmarks ==
The Seven Mills section of the park contains the remnants of Jarisha/Jarisha Mills, a Palestinian village that was depopulated in the lead up to the 1948 Arab-Israeli War.

Tel Gerisa is an archaeological site in the park, that has been identified by Benjamin Mazar and Yohanan Aharoni with the biblical Gath Rimmon. The landmark preserves the name of the historically nearby Palestinian Arab village of Jarisha, after which the Tel was named.

The Rock Garden, one of the largest of its kind in the world, reflects Israel's geological diversity. In its 4-hectare enclosure, the rocks are interspersed with some 3,500 species of plants, including over 2.4 hectares of cacti. The 2-hectare Tropical Garden has a wooden walkway shaded by palm trees, leading to a small lake. The rainforest-like microclimate supports a large variety of orchids and vines.

Yarkon River runs through the park and reaches the Mediterranean Sea at the park's western edge, then connects into the Tel Aviv Port, an entertainment and tourism center. Despite clean-up efforts in the last few years, the river is still polluted. Despite its polluted waters, in July 2011 Tel Aviv's mayor, Ron Huldai, jumped into the water and swam in the lake. Nevertheless, the region has retained its biodiversity. It is home to an abundance of insects, water fowl, golden jackals, porcupines and mongoose.

The park has six gardens: Gan HaBanim (Fallen Soldiers Memorial Garden), Gan Nifga'ei HaTeror (Terror Victims Memorial Garden), Gan HaSlaim (Rock Garden), Gan HaKaktusim (Cacti Garden), HaGan HaGazum (Trimmed Garden), and HaGan HaTropi (Tropical Garden).

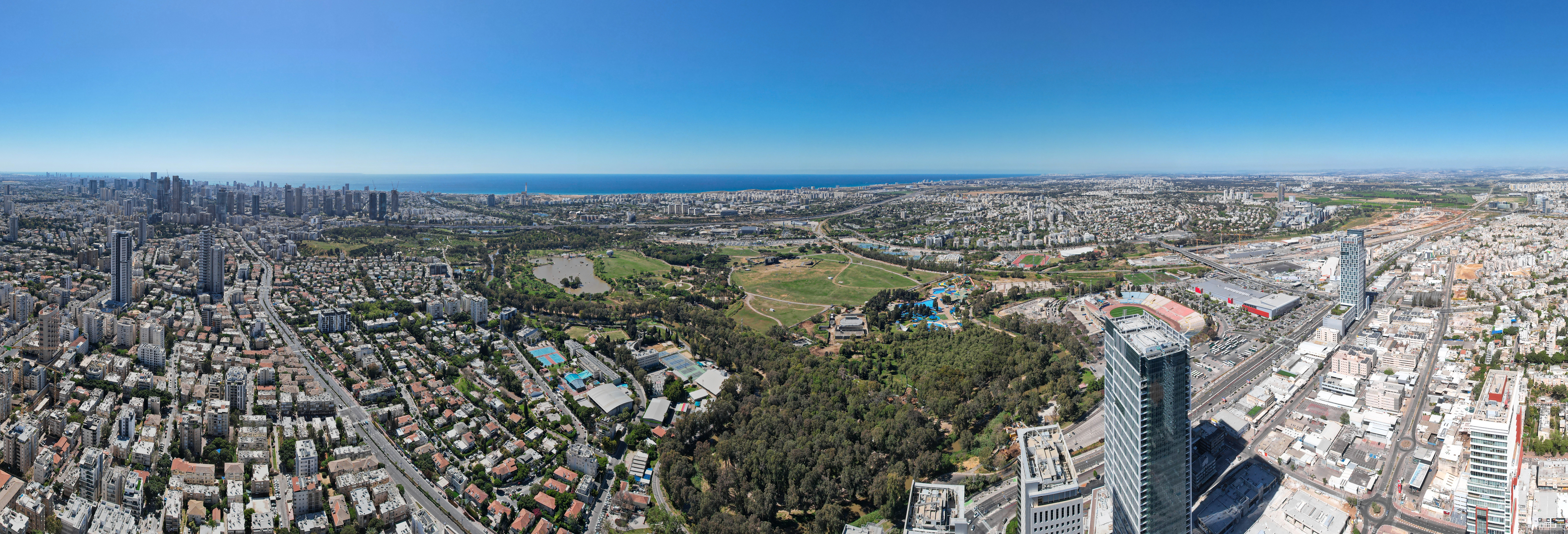
Yarkon Park from Kiryat Atidim to the Mediterranean Sea

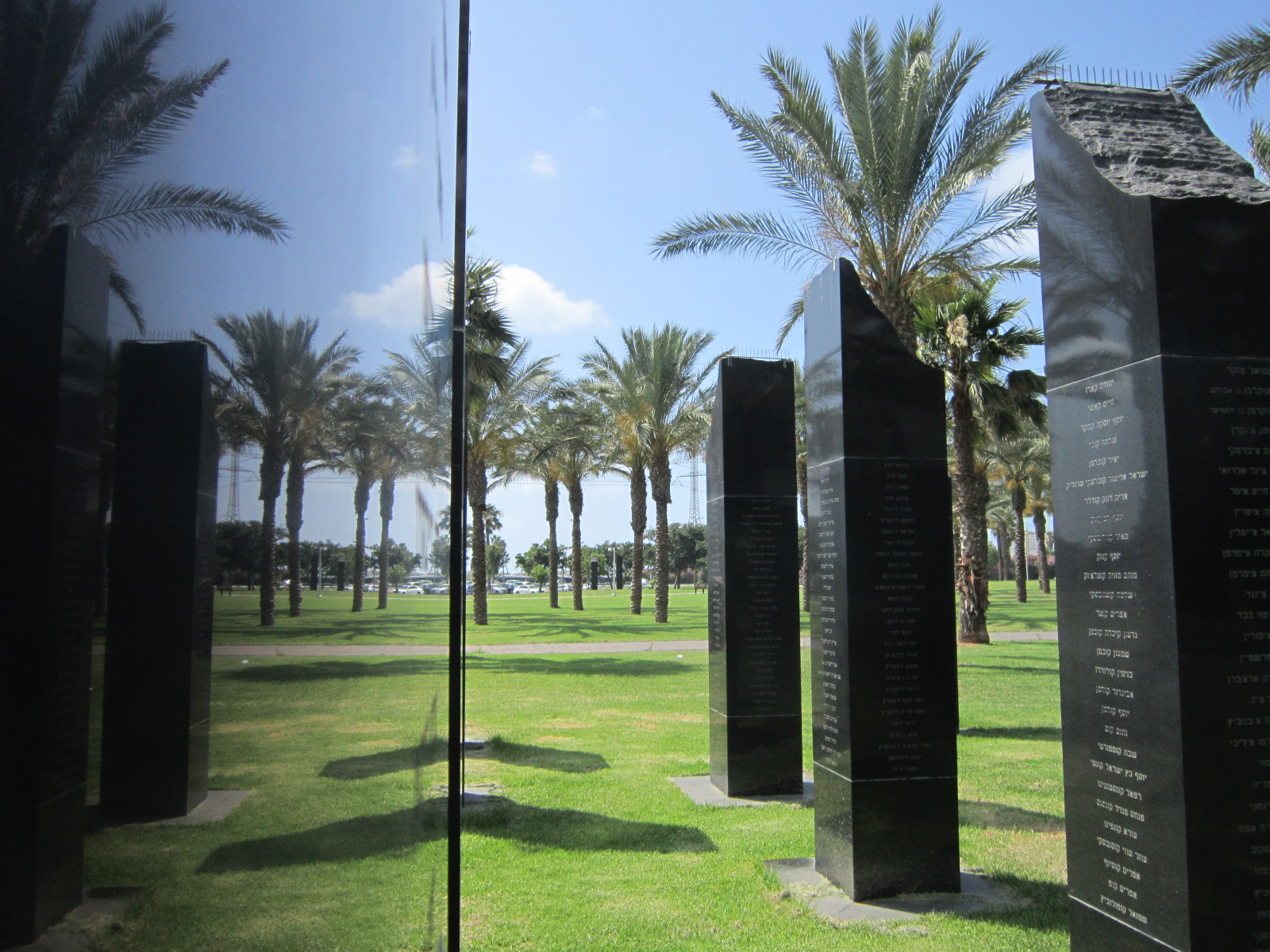
HaBanim Garden, Yarkon Park, Tel Aviv, Israel

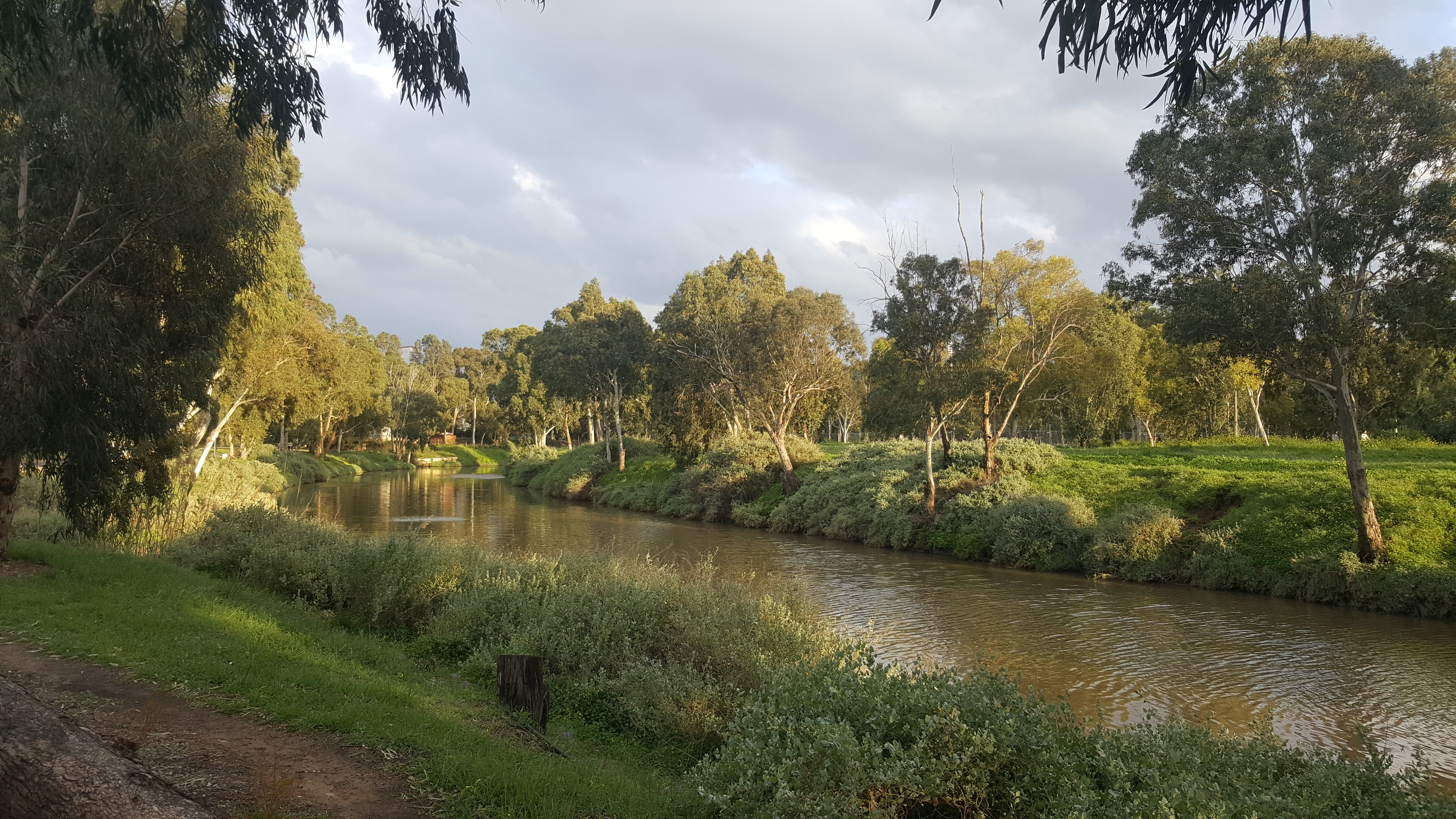
Yarkon River, Tel Aviv

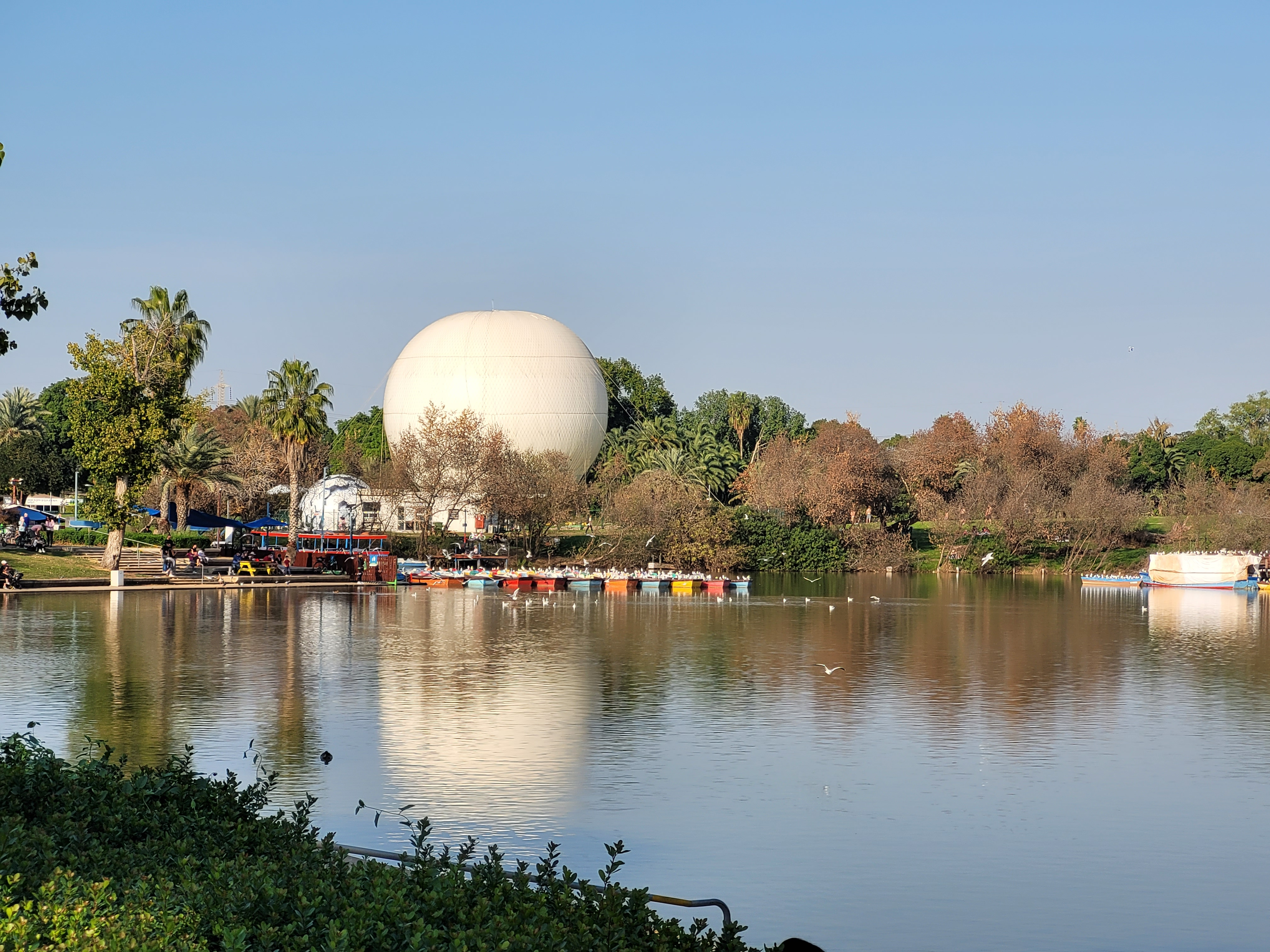
Lake of Yarkon Park

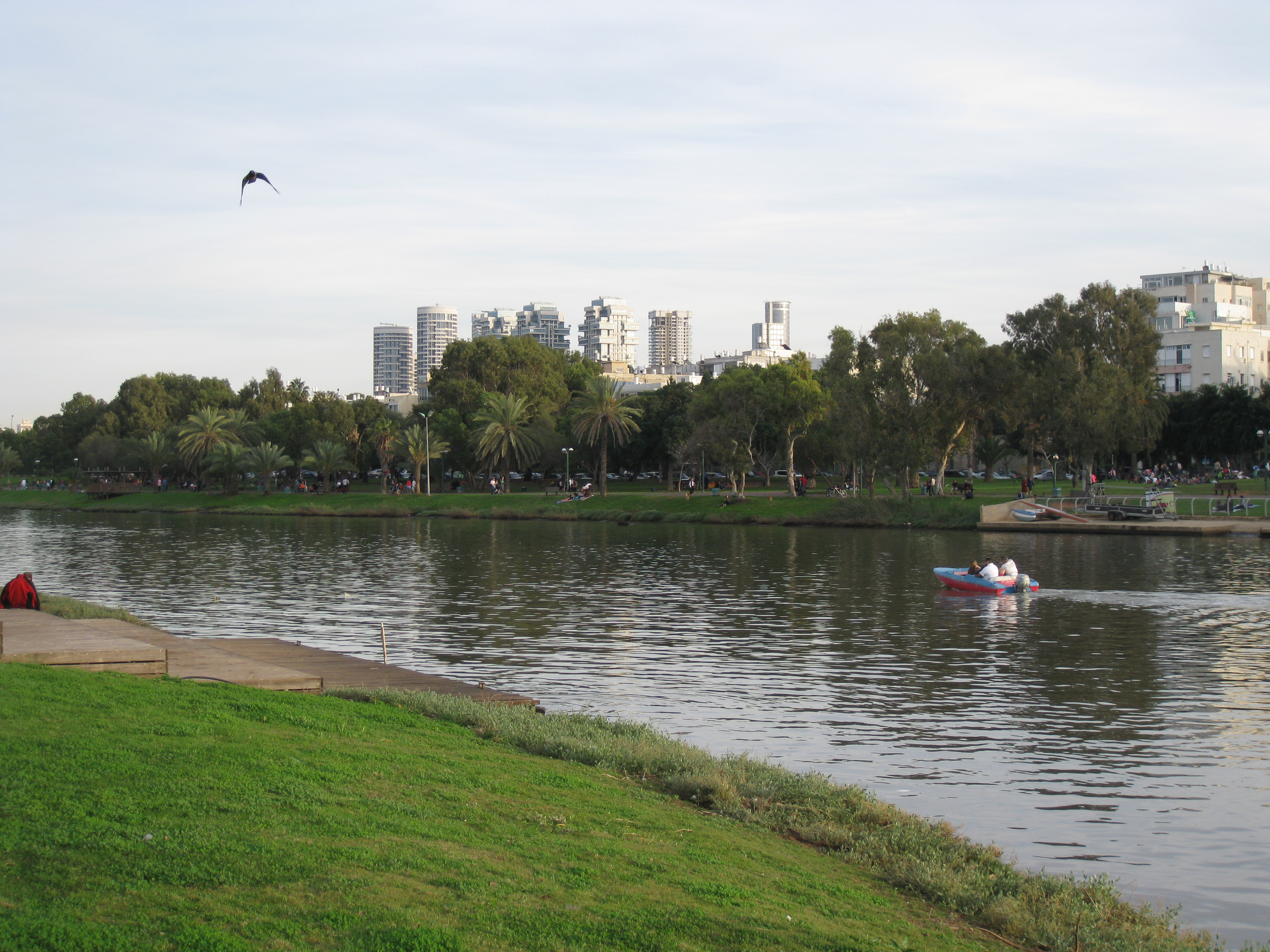
Yarkon River

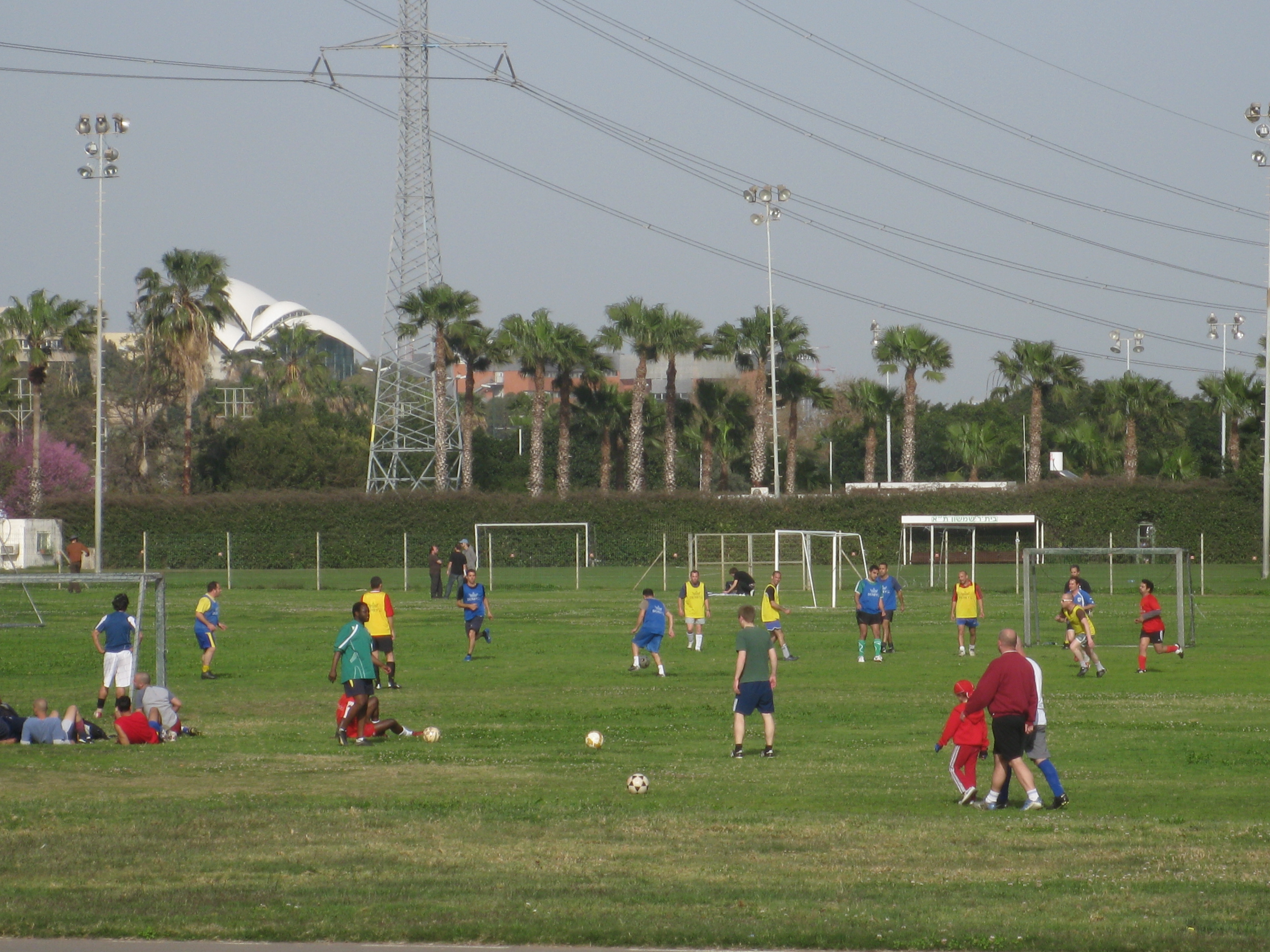
Hayarkon

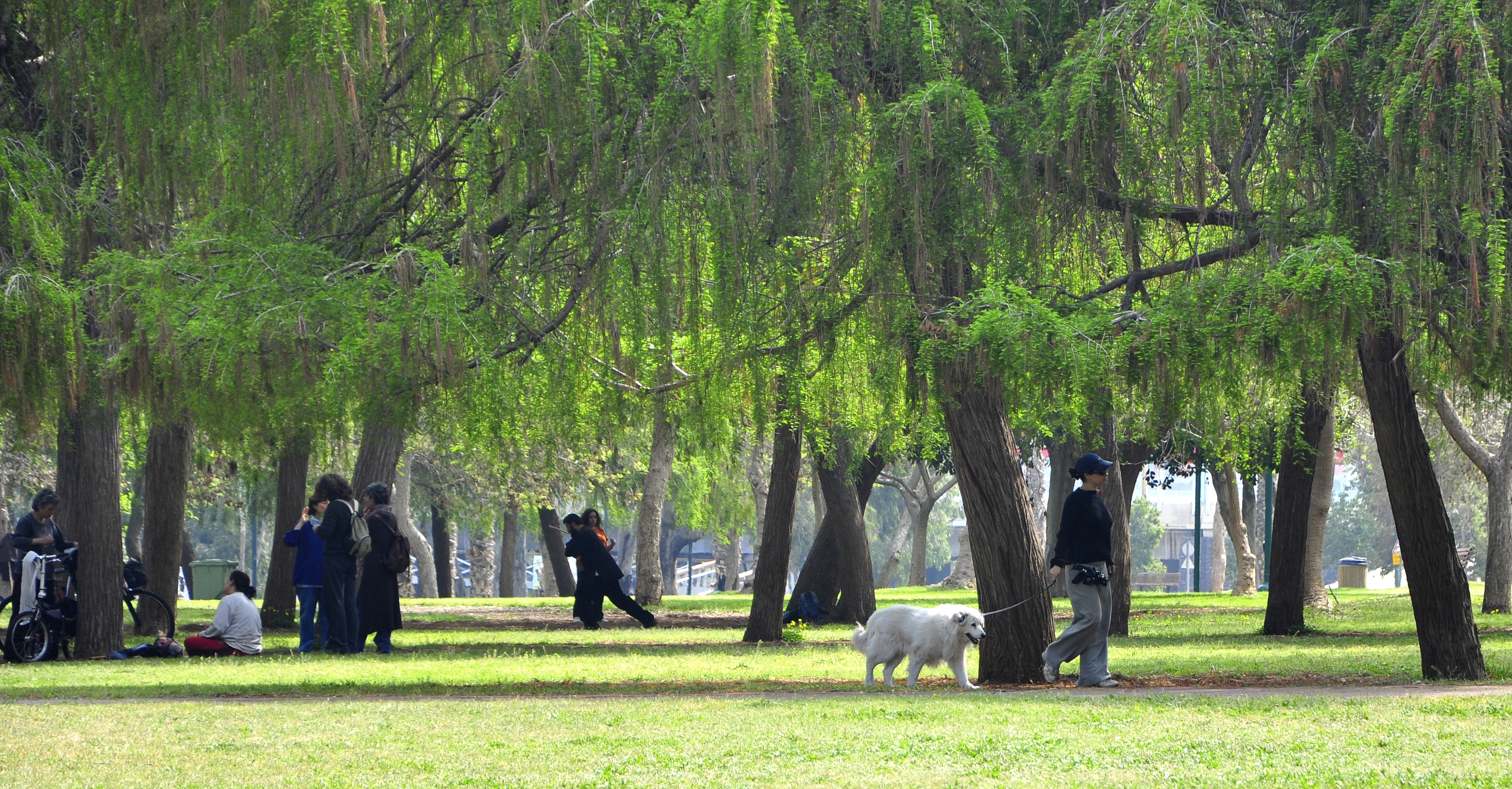
Yarkon park wide view

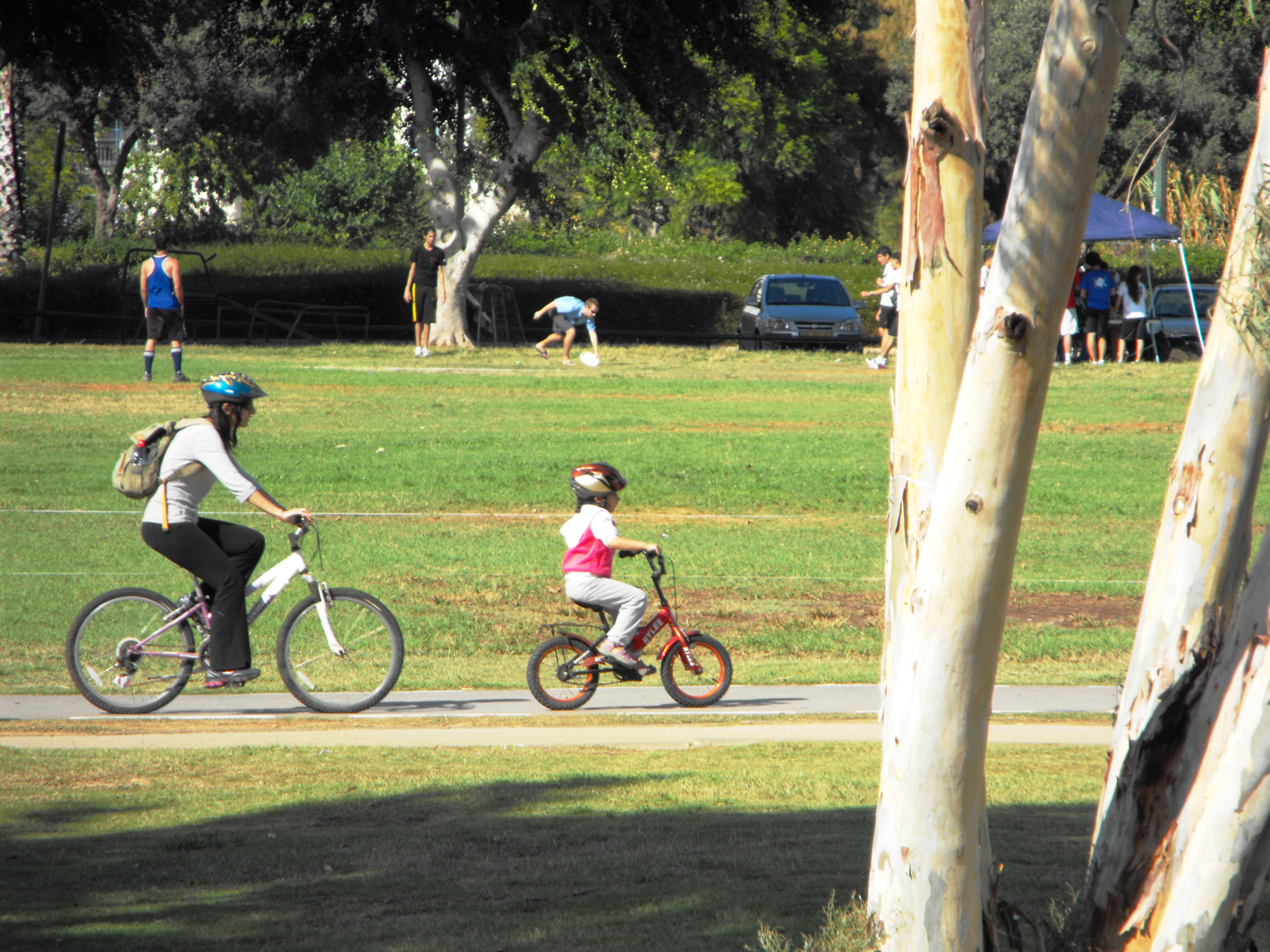
PikiWiki Israel 15306 Tel-Aviv - Yarkon park

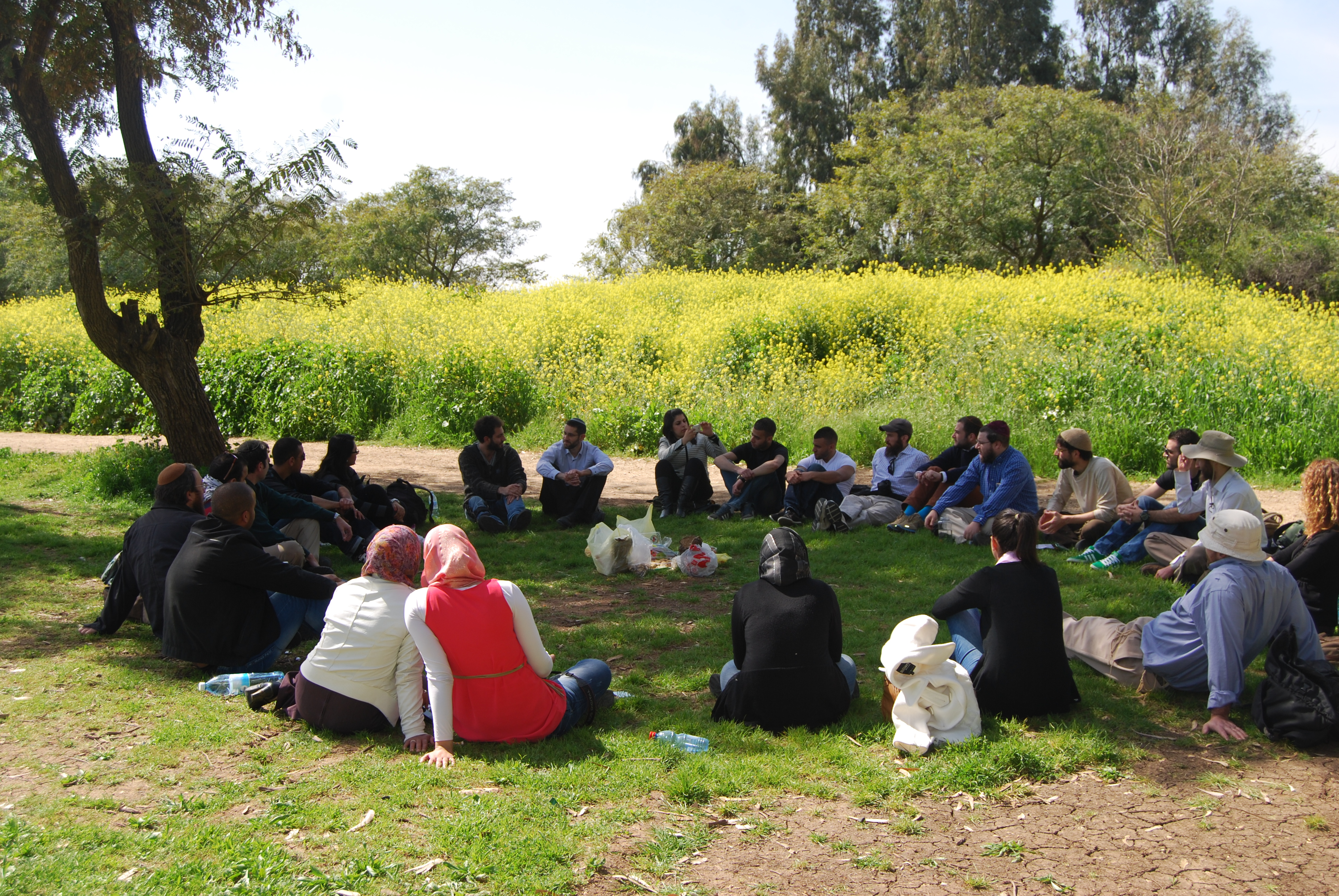
Yarkon Park Seminar Group Photo

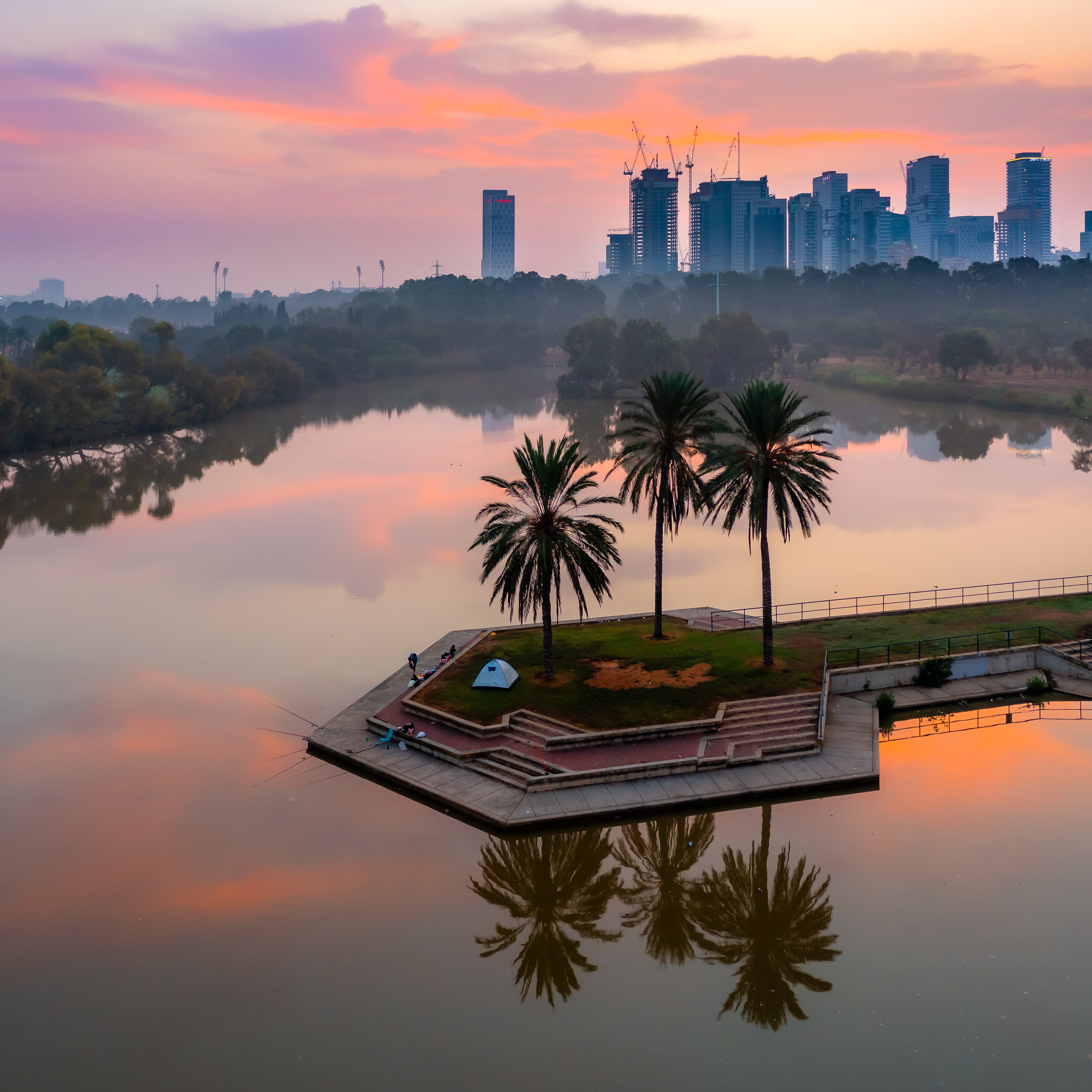
Lake of Yarkon River

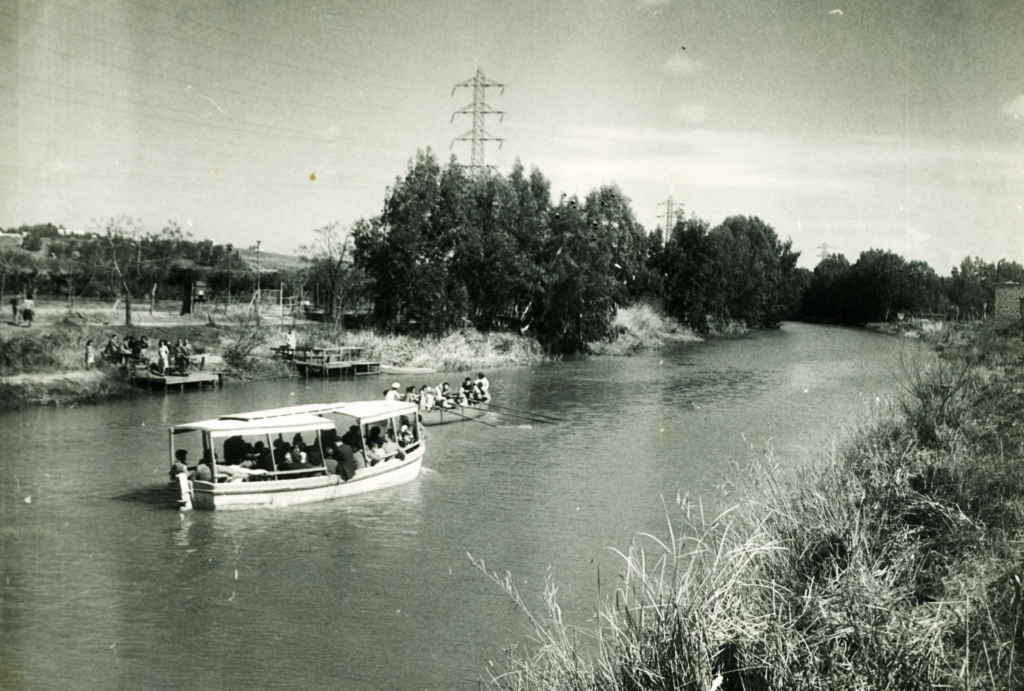
Hayarkon River

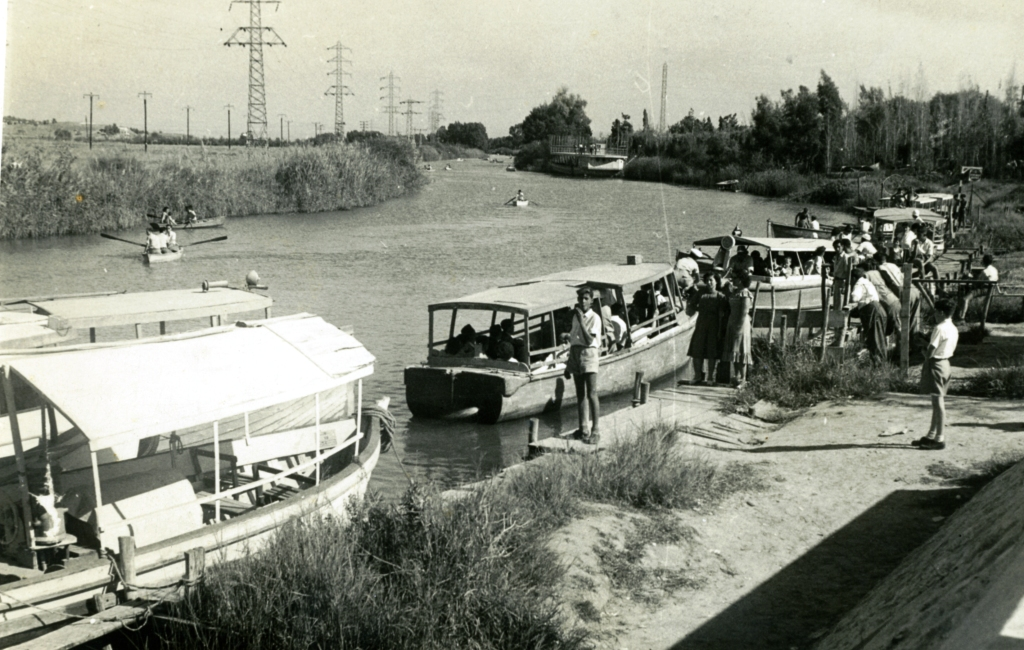
Hayarkon River

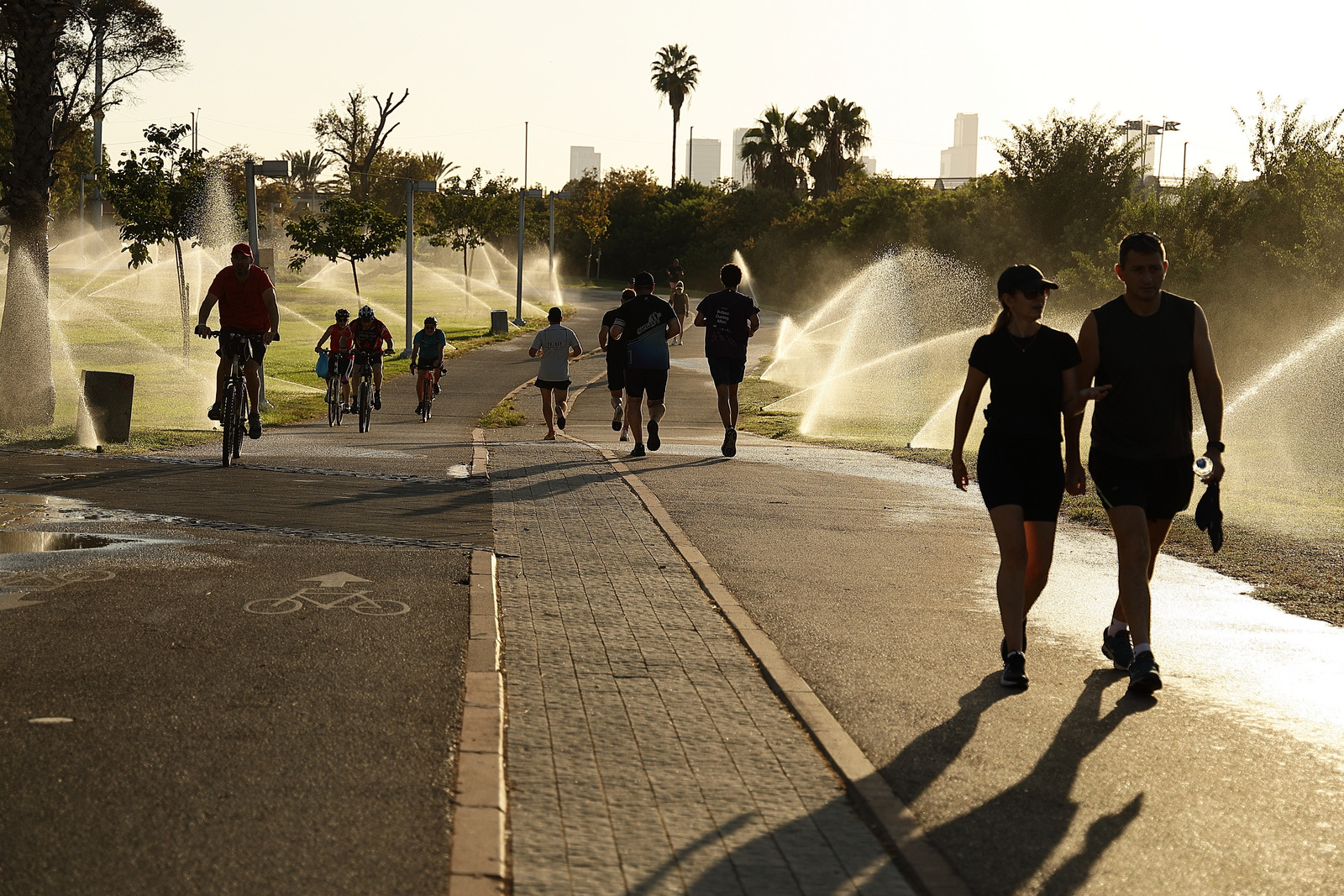
Yarkon Park on saturday morning

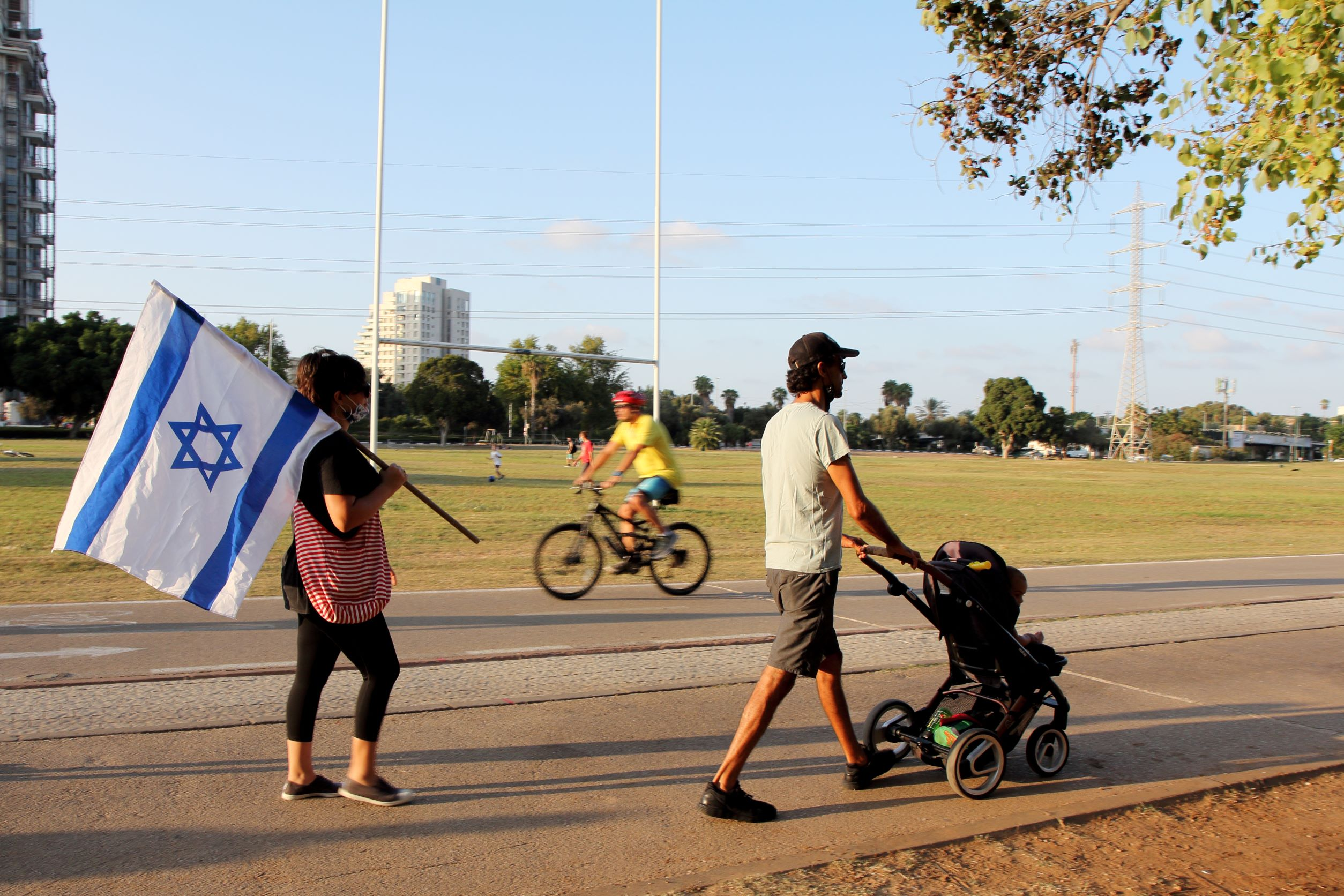
Israel country flag in Yarkon Park

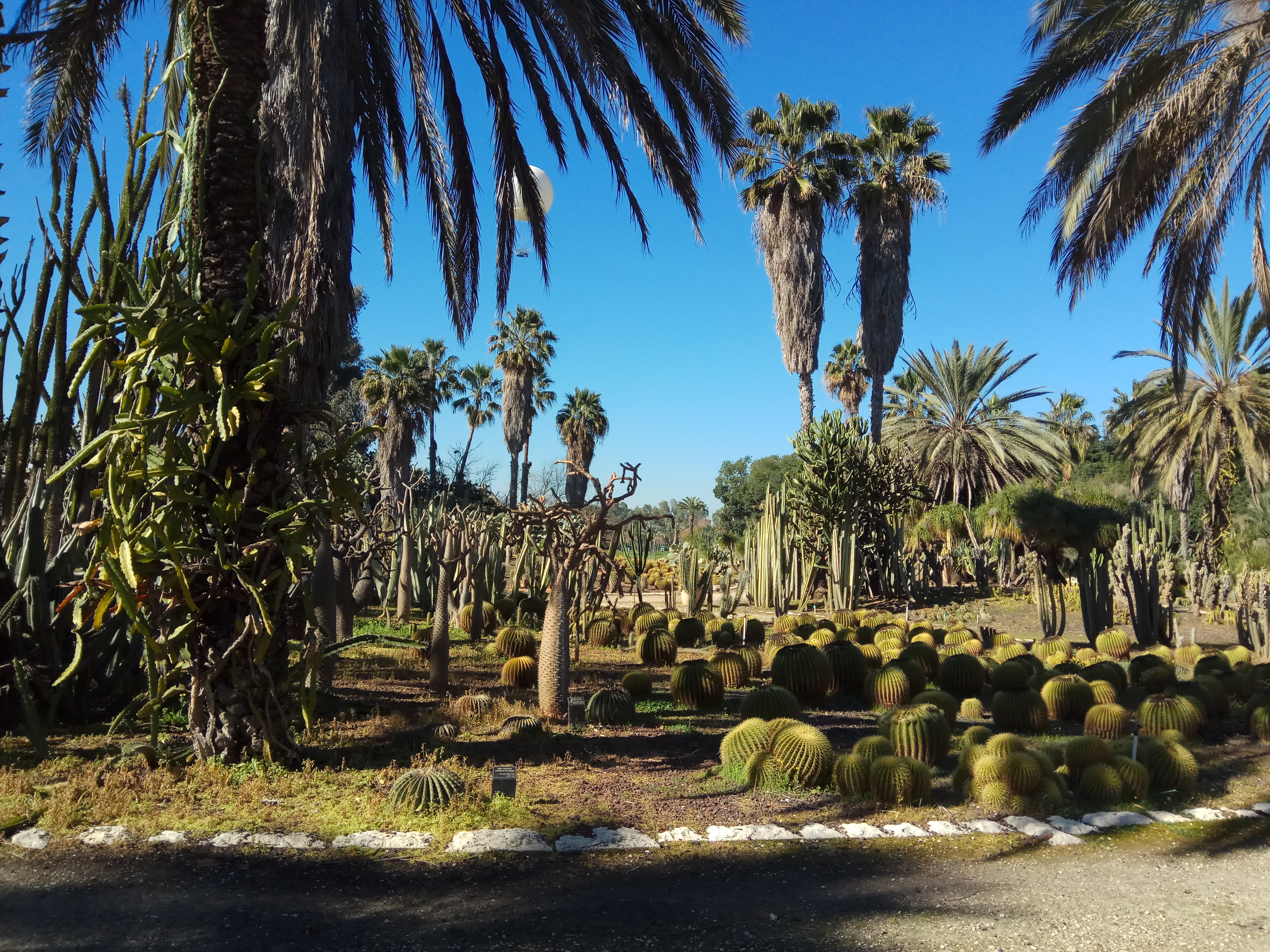
Cactus Garden at Yarkon Park

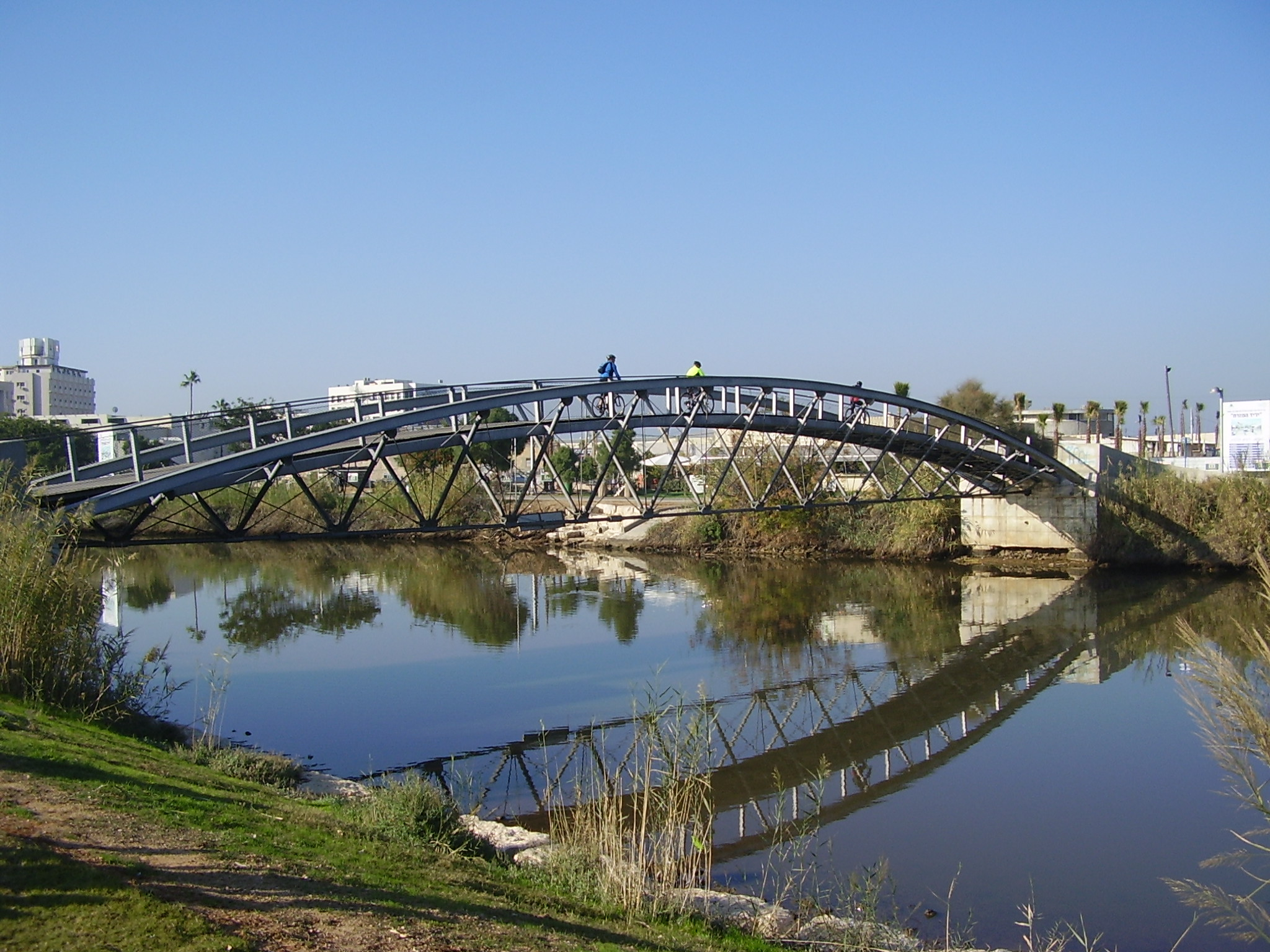
Bridge over Yarkon river Tel Aviv

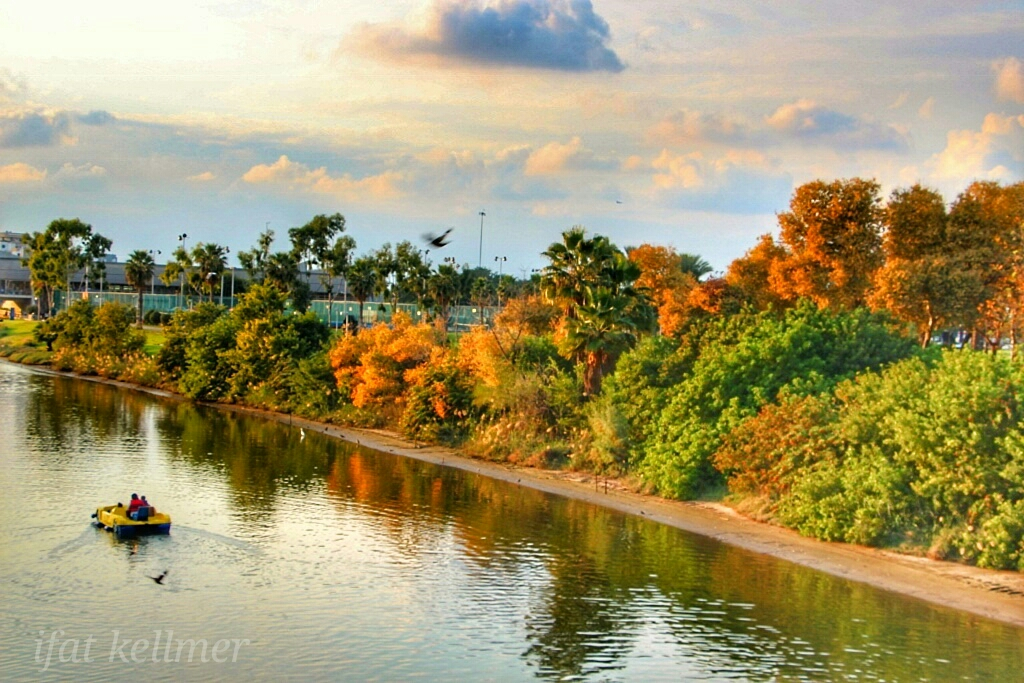
Special Sunset in Yarkon Park, Tel Aviv

== Music events ==
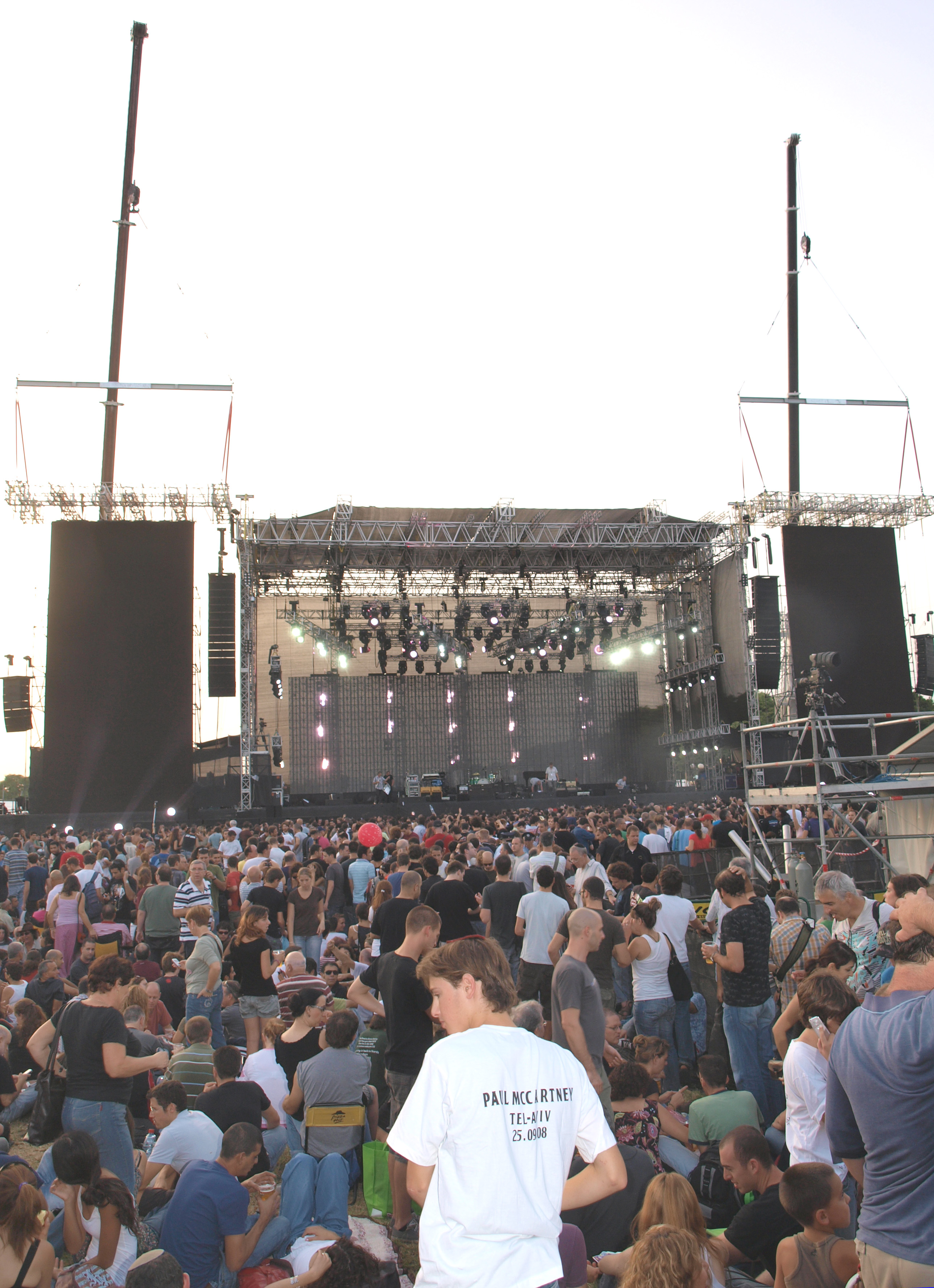
Paul McCartney concert in 2008

Many popular musical acts have played the park, including Michael Jackson, Bob Dylan, Paul McCartney, Tina Turner, The Rolling Stones, Peter Gabriel, Madonna, David Bowie, Carlos Santana, Dire Straits, Bon Jovi, Elton John, Aerosmith, Metallica, U2, Depeche Mode, Guns N' Roses, Red Hot Chili Peppers, Ugly Kid Joe, Linkin Park, Ozzy Osbourne, Joe Cocker, Morrissey, Eurythmics, Westlife, Five, Justin Timberlake, Robbie Williams, Rihanna, Sia, OneRepublic, Lady Gaga, Justin Bieber, Rod Stewart, Queen + Adam Lambert, Noa Kirel, Britney Spears and Jennifer Lopez.

American singer Britney Spears performed in the park on July 3, 2017, as part of her Britney: Live in Concert. It was attended by a crowd of 60,000 people. Due to the concert, the Israeli Labor Party delayed their election for a new chairperson by a day. It was originally scheduled for July 3, the same day as Spears's concert, but party officials feared traffic jams and that party members would choose the concert over finding a polling station.

Michael Jackson performed there, on September 19/21, 1993 during his Dangerous World Tour attended by a crowd of 70,000 people in the first show and 100,000 people in the second show.

Italian opera house La Scala performed a free outdoor concert of Verdi's Requiem in the park as a part of Tel Aviv's 100th anniversary celebrations, attracting about 100,000 people.

American singer Jennifer Lopez performed in the park as part of her It's My Party (tour) on August 1, 2019. It was attended by a crowd of 57,000 people.

=== Concerts ===
List of concerts at Yarkon Park
Year	Date	Artist	Tour	Tickets	Gross
1985	May 1	Dire Straits	Brothers in Arms Tour	—N/a	—N/a
1985	May 2	Dire Straits	Brothers in Arms Tour	—N/a	—N/a
1987	July 21	Tina Turner	Break Every Rule Tour	—N/a	—N/a
1987	July 22	Tina Turner	Break Every Rule Tour	—N/a	—N/a
1987	September 5	Bob Dylan	Temples in Flames Tour	—N/a	—N/a
1993	May 22	Guns N' Roses	Use Your Illusion Tour	40,000	—N/a
1993	June 17	Elton John	The One Tour	—N/a	—N/a
1993	June 30	Metallica	Nowhere Else to Roam Tour	—N/a	—N/a
1993	September 19	Michael Jackson	Dangerous World Tour	170,000	—N/a
1993	September 21	Michael Jackson	Dangerous World Tour	170,000	—N/a
1993	October 4	Madonna	The Girlie Show World Tour	80,000	—N/a
1994	July 12	Aerosmith	Get a Grip Tour	—N/a	—N/a
1996	July 3	David Bowie	Outside Summer Festivals Tour	—N/a	—N/a
1997	September 30	U2	PopMart Tour	31,566	$1,809,388
2001	May 16	Westlife	Where Dreams Come True Tour	—N/a	—N/a
2008	September 25	Paul McCartney	Friendship First Concert	45,000	—N/a
2009	September 1	Madonna	Sticky & Sweet Tour	99,674	$14,656,063
2009	September 2	Madonna	Sticky & Sweet Tour	99,674	$14,656,063
2010	September 28	Ozzy Osbourne	Scream World Tour	25,000	—N/a
2010	November 15	Linkin Park	A Thousand Suns World Tour	45,000	—N/a
2011	April 14	Justin Bieber	My World Tour	23,000	—N/a
2012	July 3	Guns N' Roses	Up Close and Personal Tour	—N/a	—N/a
2012	September 10	Red Hot Chili Peppers	I'm with You Tour	50,000	—N/a
2013	May 7	Depeche Mode	Delta Machine Tour	49,325	$1,752,446
2013	October 22	Rihanna	Diamonds World Tour	50,554	$6,121,631
2014	May 28	Justin Timberlake	The 20/20 Experience World Tour	44,634	$5,169,975
2014	June 4	The Rolling Stones	14 On Fire	48,167	$8,276,709
2014	September 13	Lady Gaga	ArtRave: The Artpop Ball	18,984	$1,786,945
2015	May 2	Robbie Williams	Let Me Entertain You Tour	40,000	—N/a
2015	May 28	OneRepublic	Native Tour	20,000	—N/a
2015	October 3	Bon Jovi	Bon Jovi Live!	56,000	—N/a
2016	September 12	Queen + Adam Lambert	2016 Summer Festival Tour	50,000	—N/a
2016	May 26	Elton John	Wonderful Crazy Night Tour	—N/a	—N/a
2016	August 11	Sia	Nostalgic for the Present Tour	39,000	—N/a
2017	May 3	Justin Bieber	Purpose World Tour	53,813	$6,495,093
2017	May 17	Aerosmith	Aero-Vederci Baby! Tour	50,000	—N/a
2017	June 14	Rod Stewart	The Hits Tour	20,000	—N/a
2017	July 3	Britney Spears	Britney: Live in Concert	60,000	—N/a
2017	July 15	Guns N' Roses	Not In This Lifetime... Tour	57,204	$6,761,681
2017	July 19	Radiohead	A Moon Shaped Pool Tour	48,011	$6,221,906
2018	May 26	Enrique Iglesias	Enrique Iglesias Live	41,365	$2,946,286
2018	June 28	Maluma	Fame Tour	—N/a	—N/a
2019	July 25	Bon Jovi	This House Is Not for Sale Tour	50,000	—N/a
2019	August 1	Jennifer Lopez	It's My Party	57,000	—N/a
2022	May 9	Maroon 5	2022 Tour	60,000	—N/a
2022	May 10	Maroon 5	2022 Tour	50,000	—N/a
2023	March 14	Travis Scott	—N/a	35,000	—N/a
2023	June 1	Robbie Williams	XXV Tour	30,000	—N/a
2023	June 5	Guns N' Roses	Guns N' Roses 2023 Tour	60,000	—N/a
2023	August 29	Imagine Dragons	Mercury World Tour		
2023	September 23	Noa Kirel		60,000	—N/a
2023	October 4	Bruno Mars	Bruno Mars Live	63,000	

== Sports ==
Yarkon Park contains several sporting facilities, numerous bike paths, and rowers use the Yarkon River which flows through the park.

=== Sportek Tel Aviv ===
A multi-sport centre, Sportek Tel Aviv, is located in the park, and facilitates various sports such as rock climbing, soccer, and Australian rules football. The facilities include a full size rugby union pitch, which is the home grounds of ASA Tel Aviv and Tel Aviv Ibex.

== See also ==
- Biodiversity in Israel
- List of national parks and nature reserves of Israel
- Tourism in Israel
- Railway park Tel Aviv
- National Sport Center – Tel Aviv
