= Yehuda Boaron =

Israeli footballer

Yehuda Boaron יהודה בוארון
Personal information
- Full name: Yehuda Boaron
- Date of birth: September 11, 1965 (age 61)
- Place of birth: Netanya, Israel

Youth career
- Beitar Netanya

Senior career*
Years	Team	Apps	(Gls)
1985–1995	Maccabi Netanya	14	(0)
1995–1998	Maccabi Herzliya		
1998–1999	Maccabi Haifa	0	(0)
- * Club domestic league appearances and goals

Yehuda Boaron (Hebrew: יהודה בוארון) is a former Israeli footballer.
