= Ilan Boaron =

Israeli footballer

Ilan Boaron אילן בוארון
Personal information
- Date of birth: May 3, 1972 (age 54)
- Place of birth: Netanya, Israel
- Position: Defender

Youth career
- Maccabi Netanya

Senior career*
Years	Team	Apps	(Gls)
1988–1994	Maccabi Netanya		
1994–2000	Hapoel Petah Tikva	115	(4)
2000–2001	Hapoel Haifa		
2001–2004	Maccabi Netanya		
2004–2006	Hakoah Maccabi Ramat Gan		
2006	Hapoel Be'er Sheva		
2006–2008	Ironi Ramat HaSharon		

International career
1992–1993	Israel U21	5	(0)
- * Club domestic league appearances and goals

Ilan Boaron (Hebrew: אילן בוארון; born May 3, 1972) is an Israeli former professional footballer who played as a defender. (Note: Ilan Boaron at WorldFootball.net)
