= Maccabi Haifa =

Israeli multi-sport club

- Full name: Maccabi Haifa מכבי חיפה
- Founded: 1913
- Based in: Haifa, Israel
- Colors
- President: Nir Anavi
- Website: Club home page

Maccabi Haifa (Hebrew: מכבי חיפה) is one of the biggest sports clubs in Israel and a part of the Maccabi association. It runs several sports clubs and teams in Haifa which have competed in a variety of sports over the years, such as Football, Basketball, Weightlifting, swimming, Tennis, Table tennis, Volleyball, Team handball, Water polo, Ice hockey, Artistic gymnastics, Chess, Boxing, Fencing, Rugby and others. Its teams play in green and white striped uniforms.

The club integrated the elements of Istanbul Maccabi S.K. after its dissolution in 1942.

== Teams ==
- Maccabi Haifa B.C. – basketball
- Maccabi Haifa B.C. (women) – basketball
- Maccabi Haifa F.C. – football
- Maccabi Haifa F.C. (women) – football
- Maccabi Haifa W. – weightlifting
- Haifa Wild Boars – rugby
- Maccabi Haifa Women's Rugby – women rugby 7's

== Notable members ==
- Shani Bakanov (born 2006), world champion rhythmic gymnast
- Aviv Barzelay (born 2002), Olympic swimmer
- Meiron Cheruti (born 1997), Olympic swimmer
- Jonatan Kopelev (born 1991), swimmer. European champion
- Adam Maraana (born 2003), swimmer
- Lea Polonsky (born 2002), swimmer
- Eithan Urbach (born 1977), Olympic backstroke swimmer
- Tom Yaacobov (born 1992), triple jumper
