= Rugby Israel =

Governing body for rugby union in Israel

איגוד הרוגבי הישראלי
- Sport: Rugby union
- Founded: 1971; 55 years ago
- World Rugby affiliation: 1988; 38 years ago
- Rugby Europe affiliation: 1988; 38 years ago
- President: Ofer Hamburger
- Men's coach: Kevin Musikanth
- Website: www.rugby.org.il/en/

Rugby Israel (Hebrew: איגוד הרוגבי הישראלי) is the governing body for the sport of rugby union in Israel. It was founded as the Israel Rugby Union in 1971, and joined the International Rugby Board in 1988. For political reasons, it is also part of FIRA-AER, the European rugby body, rather than the Asian Rugby Football Union. The Israel national rugby union team play in the European Nations Cup. Its headquarters are in Ra'anana.

In 2011, Peter de Villiers, coach of the South African national rugby team, and Oregan Hoskins, president of the South African Rugby Union, visited Israel and met with Israeli national team players. The coach of the Springboks conducted a training session on the rugby field at Kibbutz Yizrael.

In 2011, the Israel Olympic Committee backed the seven-a-side game as a preferred team sport ahead of the game's introduction to the Olympic Games in Rio de Janeiro in 2016.

The Israeli women's team is ranked 21st in Europe.

== See also ==
- Rugby union in Israel
- Sports in Israel
